= List of television stations in Mexico =

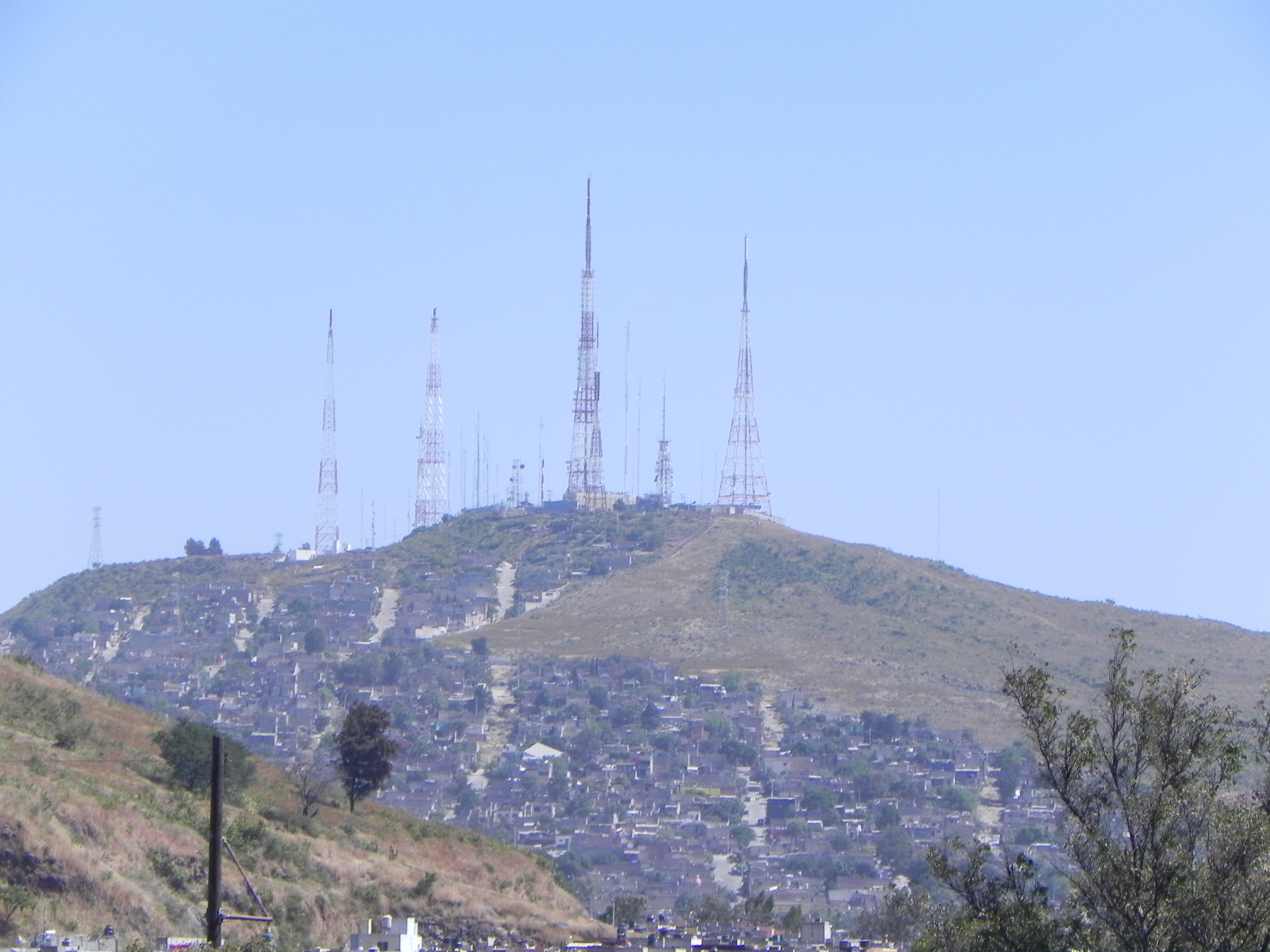
Cerro del Cuatro in Guadalajara. Most Mexican television stations transmit from mountains like this one, to increase signal coverage.

Mexico has 872 separately licensed television stations authorized by the Telecommunications Regulatory Commission.

Commercial stations are primarily operated by Televisa, TV Azteca, Grupo Imagen, Grupo Multimedios and their affiliate partners. There are seven major national commercial channels, two of which are almost exclusively available over-the-air as subchannels:

- Azteca Uno (103 total stations)
- Las Estrellas (129 total stations)
- Imagen Televisión (42 transmitters)
- Canal 5 (97 total stations)
- Azteca 7 (103 total stations)
- ADN 40
- A Más

There are also local stations with independent programs, stations and subchannels carrying Televisa's Nu9ve network which commonly shares time with local programming, and Televisa Regional stations, which incorporate programming from various Televisa networks alongside local news and magazine programs. Multimedios Televisión operates a regional network concentrated in northeastern Mexico, and a handful of independent stations operate primarily in regions along the border.

Noncommercial stations are divided into public and social concessions. Public concessions are predominantly owned by federal and state governments and public institutions of higher education. The two largest public networks are Canal Once, owned by the Instituto Politécnico Nacional, and the multiplexed transmitter network of the Sistema Público de Radiodifusión del Estado Mexicano (SPR), which offers multiple public television services. 27 of the 32 states also operate their own state networks, some of which have dozens of low-power transmitters. Social concessions are held by private universities, civil associations, and some individuals.

In addition, due to Mexico's rugged terrain, many stations operate low-powered, mostly co-channel translators (legally known as equipos complementarios de zona de sombra) to serve areas shielded by terrain, to improve signal reception in fringe areas, or (in some cases) to serve completely different television markets. Translators may be in different states from their parent stations; a handful even operate as local stations in their own right with their own local programs.

The list demonstrates the legacy of large television station concessions awarded in the 1980s and early 1990s. The two most notable of these were awarded to Televisa; the 1982 concession of 95 television stations in small communities is responsible for the bulk of the Canal de las Estrellas network, while the concession of 62 stations to Radiotelevisora de México Norte, a subsidiary of Televisa, was awarded in the early 1990s and expanded the Canal 5 and Gala TV networks. Since the conversion to digital, Televisa and Azteca have multiplexed transmitters in rural areas, bringing full national network service to smaller communities for the first time.

In March 2015, Grupo Imagen (under the name Cadena Tres I, S.A. de C.V.) and Grupo Radio Centro won concessions for 123 new television stations each, forming two new national television networks. The new networks must meet a minimum coverage standard set by the IFT for 2018 and reach full national coverage by 2020. However, Grupo Radio Centro refused to pay its winning bid of 3.058 billion pesos and thus had its concession revoked. Imagen's network, Imagen Televisión, launched on October 17, 2016, with a presence in nearly every state.

Analog stations were shut off beginning on July 18, 2013, with a pilot transition in Tijuana. In 2015, stations went digital-only throughout the country on 10 dates. Some 129 analog television stations owned by noncommercial entities, such as state governments, and another 368 repeaters of primarily Televisa stations, received exemptions to delay their transition until December 31, 2016.

Virtual channels were assigned by the IFT in 2016, unifying most transmitters of national networks under one number and ending decades of old analog channel numbers. In some cases, local stations were required to find new virtual channels.

== Aguascalientes ==
RF	VC	Call sign	Location	Network/name	ERP	Concessionaire			
30	1	XHJCM-TDT	Aguascalientes; San Juan de los Lagos, Jal.	Azteca Uno (ADN Noticias)	15.89 kW; 25.22 kW	Televisión Azteca, S.A. de C.V.			
18	3	XHCTAG-TDT	Aguascalientes	Imagen Televisión (Excélsior TV)	100 kW	Cadena Tres I, S.A. de C.V.			
35	5	XHAG-TDT	Aguascalientes; Calvillo; Jalpa, Zac. Nochistlán, Zac.	El 5*	240 kW; 17 kW; 23 kW; 29 kW	Radio Televisión			
29	7	XHLGA-TDT	Aguascalientes; San Juan de los Lagos, Jal.	Azteca 7 (A Más+)	15.91 kW; 25.26 kW	Televisión Azteca, S.A. de C.V.			
32	9	XHAGU-TDT	Aguascalientes	Nu9ve Aguascalientes	240 kW	Teleimagen del Noroeste			
7	11	XHCPAE-TDT	Aguascalientes	Canal Once (Once Niñas y Niños)		Instituto Politécnico Nacional			
15	14	XHSPRAG-TDT	Aguascalientes	SPR multiplex (11.1 Canal Once, 14.1 Canal Catorce, 14.2 Ingenio Tv, 20.1 TV UNAM, 22.1 Canal 22, 45.1 Canal del Congreso)	70.97 kW	Sistema Público de Radiodifusión del Estado Mexicano			
26	26	XHCGA-TDT	Aguascalientes	VA+ TV (UAA TV)	150 kW	Radio y Televisión de Aguascalientes; Gobierno del Estado de Aguascalientes; Universidad Autónoma de Aguascalientes			
10	8.1	XHZER-TDT	Aguascalientes	TeleZer		Grupo ZER			
XHCSCP-TDT	2.048	12	16.1	Canal 16	•	Martega Conexión Cultural, A.C.	Social	•	
Plan de los Romo (Rancho)
Plan de los Romo (Rancho)	XHCSAM-TDT	•	5	•	•	•	Michoacán Te Escucha, A.C.	Social	•
25	7	XHCVO-TDT	Calvillo	Azteca 7	4.23 kW	Televisión Azteca, S.A. de C.V.			

== Baja California ==
RF	VC	Call sign	Location	Network/name	ERP	Concessionaire
16	1	XHENE-TDT	Ensenada	Azteca Uno (adn40)	29.3 kW	Televisión Azteca
26	2	XHEBC-TDT	Ensenada	Las Estrellas	38 kW	Televimex
24	3	XHCTEN-TDT	Ensenada	Imagen Televisión	20 kW	Cadena Tres I, S.A. de C.V.
23	4	XHS-TDT	Ensenada	Televisa Regional	38 kW	Televisora de Occidente
17	5	XHENJ-TDT	Ensenada	Canal 5	38 kW	Radio Televisión
20	7	XHENT-TDT	Ensenada	Azteca 7 (a+)	29.14 kW	Televisión Azteca
7	11	XHCPDO-TDT	Ensenada	Canal Once		Instituto Politécnico Nacional
14		XHCPAH-TDT	Ensenada			Sistema Público de Radiodifusión del Estado Mexicano
23	7	XHIDC-TDT	Isla de Cedros	Azteca 7 (Azteca Uno)	0.94 kW	Televisión Azteca
28	1	XHAQ-TDT	Mexicali	Azteca Uno (ADN40)	252.44 kW	Televisión Azteca
34	2	XHBM-TDT	Mexicali	Las Estrellas (N+ Foro)	180 kW	Televimex
17	3	XHCTME-TDT	Mexicali	Imagen Televisión (Excélsior TV)	150 kW	Cadena Tres I, S.A. de C.V.
14	4	XHBC-TDT	Mexicali	Televisa Regional	200 kW	Televisora de Occidente
18	5	XHMEX-TDT	Mexicali	Canal 5	200 kW	Radio Televisión
15	10	XHMEE-TDT	Mexicali	Nu9ve	200 kW	Teleimagen del Noroeste
7		XHCPAO-TDT	Mexicali			Sistema Público de Radiodifusión del Estado Mexicano
25	20	XHEXT-TDT	Mexicali	Azteca 7 (a+)	254.55 kW	Televisión Azteca
20	66	XHILA-TDT	Mexicali	Canal 66	107.49 kW	Intermedia y Asociados de Mexicali
21	1/7	XHFEC-TDT	San Felipe	Azteca Uno (Azteca 7)	1.02 kW	Televisión Azteca
28	1	XHJK-TDT	Tijuana	Azteca Uno (ADN40)	151.03 kW	Televisión Azteca
33	3	XHCTTI-TDT	Tijuana	Imagen Televisión (Excélsior TV)	132.148 kW	Cadena Tres I, S.A. de C.V.
23	6	XETV-TDT	Tijuana	Canal 5 (16.1 Nu9ve)	200 kW	Radio Televisión
15	11	XHCPDE-TDT	Tijuana	Canal Once (Once Niñas y Niños)	78.96 kW	Instituto Politécnico Nacional
32	12	XEWT-TDT	Tijuana	Televisa Regional	200 kW	Televisora de Occidente
9		XHCPAT-TDT	Tijuana			Sistema Público de Radiodifusión del Estado Mexicano
22	19	XHUAA-TDT	Tijuana	Las Estrellas (N+ Foro)	200 kW	Televimex
29	21	XHTIT-TDT	Tijuana	Azteca 7 (a+)	148.08 kW	Televisión Azteca
34	33	XHAS-TDT	Tijuana	Canal 33	400 kW	Intermedia y Asociados de Tijuana
27	45	XHBJ-TDT	Tijuana	PSN	75 kW	Media Sports de México, S.A. de C.V.
21	49	XHDTV-TDT	Tecate		300 kW	Televisora Alco

== Baja California Sur ==
RF	VC	Call sign	Location	Network/name	ERP	Concessionaire
27	7/1	XHBAB-TDT	Bahía Asunción	Azteca 7 (Azteca Uno)	1.06 kW	Televisión Azteca
21	7/1	XHBTB-TDT	Bahía Tortugas	Azteca 7 (Azteca Uno)	0.92 kW	Televisión Azteca
24	1	XHJCC-TDT	San José del Cabo	Azteca Uno (adn40)	13.53 kW	Televisión Azteca
27	2/5	XHSJT-TDT	San José del Cabo; Cabo San Lucas	Las Estrellas (Canal 5)	30 kW; 27 kW	Televimex
26	7	XHSJC-TDT	San José del Cabo	Azteca 7 (a+)	13.5 kW	Televisión Azteca
35	10	XHCPCS-TDT	San José del Cabo; Cabo San Lucas	TV Mar	56.09 kW; 14.29 kW	Compañía Periodística Sudcaliforniana
14		XHCPEP-TDT	San José del Cabo/Cabo San Lucas			Instituto Politécnico Nacional
15		XHCPCL-TDT	San José del Cabo/Cabo San Lucas			Sistema Público de Radiodifusión del Estado Mexicano
26	1	XHCOC-TDT	Cd. Constitución	Azteca Uno (adn40)	7.28 kW	Televisión Azteca
30	2/5	XHCBC-TDT	Cd. Constitución	Las Estrellas (Canal 5)	10 kW	Televimex
27	7	XHCCB-TDT	Cd. Constitución	Azteca 7	7.29 kW	Televisión Azteca
26	2	XHGWT-TDT	Guerrero Negro	Las Estrellas	30 kW	Televimex
24	7/1	XHGNB-TDT	Guerrero Negro	Azteca 7 (Azteca Uno)	0.89 kW	Televisión Azteca
21	1	XHAPB-TDT	La Paz	Azteca Uno (adn40)	49.91 kW	Televisión Azteca
28	2	XHLPT-TDT	La Paz	Las Estrellas (FOROtv)	26 kW	Televimex
22	3	XHCTLP-TDT	La Paz	Imagen Televisión (Excélsior TV)	100 kW	Cadena Tres I, S.A. de C.V.
29	5/9	XHLPB-TDT	La Paz	Canal 5 (Nu9ve)	26 kW	Radio Televisión
25	7	XHPBC-TDT	La Paz	Azteca 7 (a+)	29.63 kW	Televisión Azteca
30	8	XHBZC-TDT	La Paz	Canal 8	50.484 kW	Gobierno del Estado de Baja California Sur
23	10	XHCPBC-TDT	La Paz	TV Mar	112.85 kW	Compañía Periodística Sudcaliforniana
14		XHCPCK-TDT	La Paz			Instituto Politécnico Nacional
31		XHSPB-TDT	La Paz			Sistema Público de Radiodifusión del Estado Mexicano
22	7/1	XHSIB-TDT	San Ignacio	Azteca 7 (Azteca Uno)	1.08 kW	Televisión Azteca
21	7/1	XHSIS-TDT	San Isidro	Azteca 7 (Azteca Uno)	0.92 kW	Televisión Azteca
24	7/1	XHSRB-TDT	Santa Rosalía	Azteca 7 (Azteca Uno)	1.13 kW	Televisión Azteca

== Campeche ==
RF	VC	Call sign	Location	Network/name	ERP	Concessionaire
29	1	XHGE-TDT	Campeche	Azteca Uno (adn40)	20.33 kW	Televisión Azteca
34	2	XHCPA-TDT	Campeche	Las Estrellas (FOROtv)	28 kW	Televimex
20	3	XHCTCA-TDT	Campeche	Imagen Televisión (Excélsior TV)	50 kW	Cadena Tres I, S.A. de C.V.
30	4	XHCCA-TDT	Campeche	TRC	10 kW	Gobierno del Estado de Campeche
22	5/9	XHAN-TDT	Campeche	Canal 5 (Nu9ve)	28 kW	Radio Televisión
24	7	XHCAM-TDT	Campeche	Azteca 7 (a+)	20.46 kW	Televisión Azteca
27	13	XHTMCA-TDT	Campeche	Telsusa (Canal 13) (TN23)	49.035 kW	Telsusa Televisión México
14	11	XHCPES-TDT	Campeche	Canal Once		Instituto Politécnico Nacional
32	14	XHSPRCC-TDT	Campeche	SPR multiplex (11.1 Canal Once, 14.1 Canal Catorce, 14.2 Ingenio Tv, 20.1 TV UNAM, 22.1 Canal 22, 45.1 Canal del Congreso)	8.18 kW	Sistema Público de Radiodifusión del Estado Mexicano
35	1	XHGN-TDT	Ciudad del Carmen	Azteca Uno (adn40)	8.16 kW	Televisión Azteca
22	2/5	XHCDC-TDT	Ciudad del Carmen	Las Estrellas (Canal 5)	31 kW	Televimex
31	7	XHCCT-TDT	Ciudad del Carmen	Azteca 7	21.74 kW	Televisión Azteca
25	13	XHTMCC-TDT	Ciudad del Carmen	Telsusa (Canal 13) (TN23)	150 kW	Telsusa Televisión México
7		XHCPEQ-TDT	Ciudad del Carmen			Instituto Politécnico Nacional
8		XHCPER-TDT	Ciudad del Carmen			Sistema Público de Radiodifusión del Estado Mexicano
29	1	XHPEH-TDT	Escárcega	Azteca Uno (adn40)	7.23 kW	Televisión Azteca
21	2	XHEFT-TDT	Escárcega	Las Estrellas	18 kW	Televimex
27	7	XHECA-TDT	Escárcega	Azteca 7	7.27 kW	Televisión Azteca

== Chiapas ==
RF	VC	Call sign	Location	Network/name	ERP	Concessionaire
27	1	XHOMC-TDT	Arriaga	Azteca Uno (adn40)	5 kW	Televisión Azteca
32	2/5	XHWVT-TDT	Tonalá; Arriaga	Las Estrellas	20 kW; 18 kW	Televimex
34	2/5	XHCIC-TDT	Cintalapa de Figueroa	Las Estrellas (Canal 5)	15 kW	Televimex
35	1	XHDZ-TDT	Comitán de Dominguez	Azteca Uno (adn40)	4.48 kW	Televisión Azteca
23	2	XHCMZ-TDT	Comitán de Dominguez	Las Estrellas	32 kW	Televimex
22	5/9	XHCZC-TDT	Comitán de Dominguez	Canal 5 (Nu9ve)	32 kW	Radio Televisión
30	7	XHCOM-TDT	Comitán de Dominguez	Azteca 7	4.55 kW	Televisión Azteca
32	2/5	XHHUC-TDT	Huixtla	Las Estrellas (Canal 5)	40 kW	Televimex
25	7	XHMCH-TDT	Motozintla	Azteca 7	5.35 kW	Televisión Azteca
32	2	XHOCC-TDT	Ocosingo	Las Estrellas	39 kW	Televimex
14	1	XHAO-TDT	San Cristóbal de las Casas; Tuxtla Gutiérrez	Azteca Uno (adn40)	46.1 kW; 58.31 kW	Televisión Azteca
16	2	XHSCC-TDT	San Cristóbal de las Casas	Las Estrellas (FOROtv)	30 kW	Televimex
17	5/9	XHSNC-TDT	San Cristóbal de las Casas	Canal 5 (Nu9ve)	30 kW	Radio Televisión
15	7	XHCSA-TDT	San Cristóbal de las Casas; Tuxtla Gutiérrez	Azteca 7 (a+)	46.29 kW; 58.47 kW	Televisión Azteca
36	13	XHDY-TDT	San Cristóbal de las Casas	Telsusa (Canal 13) (TN23)	160 kW	Comunicación del Sureste
18	14	XHSPRSC-TDT	San Cristóbal de las Casas	SPR multiplex (11.1 Canal Once, 14.1 Canal Catorce, 14.2 Ingenio Tv, 20.1 TV UNAM, 22.1 Canal 22, 45.1 Canal del Congreso)	4.29 kW	Sistema Público de Radiodifusión del Estado Mexicano
30	1	XHTAP-TDT	Tapachula	Azteca Uno (adn40)	51.44 kW	Televisión Azteca
23	2	XHAA-TDT	Tapachula	Las Estrellas	62 kW	Televimex
29	3	XHCTTH-TDT	Tapachula	Imagen Televisión (Excélsior TV)	54.192 kW	Cadena Tres I, S.A. de C.V.
34	5/9	XHTAH-TDT	Tapachula	Canal 5 (Nu9ve)	62 kW	Radio Televisión
36	7	XHJU-TDT	Tapachula	Azteca 7 (a+)	51.08 kW	Televisión Azteca
28	13	XHGK-TDT	Tapachula	Telsusa (Canal 13) (TN23)	80 kW	Comunicación del Sureste
26	14	XHSPRTP-TDT	Tapachula	SPR multiplex (11.1 Canal Once, 14.1 Canal Catorce, 20.1 TV UNAM, 22.1 Canal 22)	7.39 kW	Sistema Público de Radiodifusión del Estado Mexicano
30	7	XHTON-TDT	Tonalá	Azteca 7	4.21 kW	Televisión Azteca
29	2	XHTUA-TDT	Tuxtla Gutiérrez	Las Estrellas (5.1 Canal 5, 9.1 Nu9ve)	45 kW	Televimex
27	3	XHCTCR-TDT	Tuxtla Gutiérrez; San Cristóbal de las Casas	Imagen Televisión (Excélsior TV)	40 kW; 10 kW	Cadena Tres I, S.A. de C.V.
24	8	XHTX-TDT	Tuxtla Gutiérrez		45 kW	Telemisión
20	10	XHTTG-TDT	Tuxtla Gutiérrez; Comitán de Domínguez; San Cristóbal de las Casas (RF 19); Tapachula (RF 33)	Canal 10 Chiapas (Ingenio Tv)	34.21 kW; 0.94 kW; 4.96 kW; 27.12 kW	Gobierno del Estado de Chiapas
7	12	XHTUG-TDT	Tuxtla Gutiérrez		5 kW	Simón Valanci Buzali
31	14	XHSPRTC-TDT	Tuxtla Gutiérrez	SPR multiplex (11.1 Canal Once, 14.1 Canal Catorce, 14.2 Ingenio Tv, 20.1 TV UNAM, 22.1 Canal 22, 45.1 Canal del Congreso)	8.96 kW	Sistema Público de Radiodifusión del Estado Mexicano
28	2/5	XHVAC-TDT	Venustiano Carranza	Las Estrellas (Canal 5)	22 kW	Televimex
26	2/5	XHVFC-TDT	Villaflores	Las Estrellas (Canal 5)	20 kW	Televimex

== Chihuahua ==
RF	VC	Call sign	Location	Network/name	ERP	Concessionaire
36	2	XHCHC-TDT	Cd. Camargo	Las Estrellas	24 kW	Televimex
21	7/1	XHCGJ-TDT	Cd. Camargo	Azteca 7 (Azteca Uno)	17.09 kW	Televisión Azteca
17	14	XHCPAW-TDT	Cd. Camargo	Canal Catorce		Sistema Público de Radiodifusion del Estado Mexicano
36	2	XHCCH-TDT	Cd. Cuauhtémoc	Las Estrellas	26 kW	Televimex
20	11	XHCHU-TDT	Cd. Cuauhtémoc	Canal Once (Once Niñas y Niños)	22.09 kW	Instituto Politécnico Nacional
33	28	XHCTH-TDT	Cd. Cuauhtémoc	Canal 28	5.014 kW	Sistema Regional de Televisión
18	14	XHCPAV-TDT	Cd. Cuauhtémoc			Sistema Público de Radiodifusion del Estado Mexicano
33	2	XHDEH-TDT	Cd. Delicias	Las Estrellas	20 kW	Televimex
19	5	XHCDE-TDT	Cd. Delicias; Cd. Camargo	Canal 5	20 kW; 21 kW	Radio Televisión
20	11	XHCHD-TDT	Cd. Delicias	Canal Once (Once Niñas y Niños)	146.17 kW	Instituto Politécnico Nacional
24	1/7	XHJCH-TDT	Cd. Jiménez	Azteca Uno (Azteca 7)	1.3 kW	Televisión Azteca
33	2	XHBU-TDT	Cd. Jiménez	Las Estrellas	11 kW	Televimex
34	1	XHCJE-TDT	Cd. Juárez	Azteca Uno (adn40)	146.61 kW	Televisión Azteca
29	2	XEPM-TDT	Cd. Juárez	Las Estrellas (Estrellas El Paso)	200 kW	Televimex
31	3	XHCTCJ-TDT	Cd. Juárez	Imagen Televisión (Excélsior TV)	150 kW	Cadena Tres I, S.A. de C.V.
33	5/10	XHJUB-TDT	Cd. Juárez	Canal 5 (Nu9ve)	200 kW	Radio Televisión
28	6	XHMTCH-TDT	Cd. Juárez	Canal 6 (Milenio Televisión, CGTN En Español, ABC Televisión)	45 kW	Multimedios Televisión
30	8	XHJCI-TDT	Cd. Juárez	Televisa Regional (N+ Foro)	200 kW	Televisora de Occidente
8	16	XHCPCN-TDT	Cd. Juárez	Canal Catorce	127.96 kW	Sistema Público de Radiodifusion del Estado Mexicano
36	20	XHCJH-TDT	Cd. Juárez	Azteca 7 (a+)	146.31 kW	Televisión Azteca
32	44	XHIJ-TDT	Cd. Juárez	Canal 44 (44 Alternativo, Canal Catorce, Intermedia Televisión)	86.936 kW	Televisora Nacional
35	50	XEJ-TDT	Cd. Juárez	XEJ (Once Niñas y Niños)	10 kW	Televisión de la Frontera
29	2	XHMAC-TDT	Cd. Madera	Las Estrellas	14 kW	Televimex
22	1	XHCH-TDT	Chihuahua	Azteca Uno (adn40)	51.47 kW	Televisión Azteca
23	1.3	XHIT-TDT	Chihuahua; Cd. Cuauhtémoc	Azteca Uno (-1)	51.41 kW; 23.85 kW	Televisión Azteca
26	2	XHFI-TDT	Chihuahua	Las Estrellas (N+ Foro)	47 kW	Televimex
29	3	XHCTCH-TDT	Chihuahua	Imagen Televisión (Excélsior TV)	52.761 kW	Cadena Tres I, S.A. de C.V.
24	5/9	XHCHZ-TDT	Chihuahua; Cd. Cuauhtémoc	Canal 5 (Nu9ve Chihuahua)	47 kW; 26 kW	Radio Televisión
32	6	XHAUC-TDT	Chihuahua	Multimedios Televisión	45 kW	Telemisión
21	7	XHECH-TDT	Chihuahua; Cd. Cuauhtémoc	Azteca 7 (a+)	44.43 kW; 23.9 kW	Televisión Azteca
25	11	XHCHI-TDT	Chihuahua	Canal Once (Once Niñas y Niños)	130.31 kW	Instituto Politécnico Nacional
34	28	XHABC-TDT	Chihuahua	Canal 28	21.5 kW	Sistema Regional de Televisión
30	44	XHICCH-TDT	Chihuahua; Cd. Cuauhtémoc; Cd. Delicias	Canal 44 (44 Alternativo, Intermedia Televisión)	140.68 kW; 129.78 kW; 25.89 kW	Intermedia de Chihuahua
8	14	XHCPAU-TDT	Chihuahua	Canal Catorce	4.10 kW	Sistema Público de Radiodifusion del Estado Mexicano
25	1	XHHPC-TDT	Hidalgo del Parral	Azteca Uno (adn40)	8.97 kW	Televisión Azteca
26	2/5	XHHPT-TDT	Hidalgo del Parral	Las Estrellas (Canal 5)	24 kW	Televimex
22	7	XHHDP-TDT	Hidalgo del Parral	Azteca 7	9.03 kW	Televisión Azteca
30	13	XHMH-TDT	Hidalgo del Parral	Multimedios Televisión	25 kW	Pedro Luis Fitzmaurice Meneses
24	1/7	XHCGC-TDT	Nuevo Casas Grandes	Azteca Uno (Azteca 7)	9.63 kW	Televisión Azteca
27	2/5	XHNCG-TDT	Nuevo Casas Grandes	Las Estrellas (Canal 5)	34 kW	Televimex
16	1/7	XHHR-TDT	Ojinaga	Azteca Uno (Azteca 7)	1.13 kW	Televisión Azteca
15	2	XHOCH-TDT	Ojinaga	Las Estrellas	23 kW	Televimex
35	2	XHBVT-TDT	San Buenaventura	Las Estrellas	25 kW	Televimex
34	2	XHSAC-TDT	Santa Barbara	Las Estrellas	23 kW	Televimex

== Coahuila ==
RF	VC	Call sign	Location	Network/name	ERP	Concessionaire
35	2	XHWDT-TDT	Allende	Las Estrellas	40 kW	Televimex
25	1	XHHE-TDT	Ciudad Acuña; Piedras Negras	Azteca Uno (adn40)	4.21 kW; 3.64 kW	Televisión Azteca
34	2	XHAMC-TDT	Ciudad Acuña	Las Estrellas	50 kW	Televimex
27	5	XHCHW-TDT	Ciudad Acuña	Canal 5	50 kW	Radio Televisión
36	58	XHCAW-TDT	Ciudad Acuña	RCG Acuña (RCG Saltillo)	20.9 kW	Hilda Graciela Rivera Flores
24	1	XHHC-TDT	Monclova	Azteca Uno (adn40)	11.69 kW	Televisión Azteca
35	2	XHMOT-TDT	Monclova	Las Estrellas	50 kW	Televimex
29	5	XHMLC-TDT	Monclova	Canal 5	50 kW	Radio Televisión
33	6	XHMTCO-TDT	Monclova	Canal 6	45.052 kW	Multimedios Televisión
27	7	XHMLA-TDT	Monclova	Azteca 7 (a+)	11.66 kW	Televisión Azteca
36	29	XHMAP-TDT	Monclova	Canal 29	16.723 kW	Frente Ciudadano Pro-Antena Parabólica de Monclova
29	1	XHPFC-TDT	Parras de la Fuente	Azteca Uno (adn40)	10.92 kW	Televisión Azteca
22	2/5	XHPAC-TDT	Parras de la Fuente	Las Estrellas (Canal 5)	62 kW	Televimex
28	7	XHPFE-TDT	Parras de la Fuente	Azteca 7	10.93 kW	Televisión Azteca
30	2	XHPNT-TDT	Piedras Negras	Las Estrellas	43 kW	Televimex
31	5	XHPNH-TDT	Piedras Negras	Canal 5	43 kW	Radio Televisión
32	7	XHPNG-TDT	Piedras Negras; Ciudad Acuña	Azteca 7 (a+)	16.33 kW; 6.22 kW	Televisión Azteca
20	9	XHPN-TDT	Piedras Negras; Nuevo Laredo, Tamps.	Nu9ve Piedras Negras	43 kW; 150 kW	Teleimagen del Noroeste
33	12	XHPNW-TDT	Piedras Negras	Súper Channel 12/Multimedios (XHPNW -2 hours)	15 kW	XHFJS-TV
26	1	XHCJ-TDT	Sabinas	Azteca Uno (adn40)	9.98 kW	Televisión Azteca
23	2	XHRDC-TDT	Nueva Rosita	Las Estrellas	42 kW	Televimex
29	5	XHNOH-TDT	Nueva Rosita	Canal 5	42 kW	Radio Televisión
34	7	XHSBC-TDT	Nueva Rosita	Azteca 7	0.2 kW	Televisión Azteca
21	15	XHSDD-TDT	Sabinas	Independent (Canal 5 Sabinas -2 hours)	20 kW	Grupo Comunik
26	3	XHCTSA-TDT	Saltillo	Imagen Televisión (Excélsior TV)	50 kW	Cadena Tres I, S.A. de C.V.
20	5	XHSTC-TDT	Saltillo	Canal 5	45 kW	Radio Televisión
33	7	XHLLO-TDT	Saltillo	Azteca 7 (a+)	8.74 kW	Televisión Azteca
30	8	XHRCG-TDT	Saltillo	RCG Saltillo	31 kW	Roberto Casimiro González Treviño
24	9	XHAE-TDT	Saltillo	Nu9ve	45 kW	Teleimagen del Noroeste
36	10	XHTSCO-TDT	Saltillo	Tele Saltillo (Tele Saltillo -2, -3, -4)	45 kW	Tele Saltillo
31	11	XHCPDF-TDT	Saltillo	Canal Once (Once Niñas y Niños)	9.08 kW	Instituto Politécnico Nacional
13		XHPEAB-TDT	Saltillo			Radio Cultural del Centro, A.C.
17	17	XHPBSA-TDT	Saltillo	Coahuila Televisión	15.2 kW	Gobierno del Estado de Coahuila
14	1	XHGDP-TDT	Torreón	Azteca Uno (adn40)	188.17 kW	Televisión Azteca
20	2	XHO-TDT	Torreón	Las Estrellas (N+ Foro)	150 kW	Televimex
24	3	XHCTTR-TDT	Torreón	Imagen Televisión (Excélsior TV)	160 kW	Cadena Tres I, S.A. de C.V.
35	5	XELN-TDT	Torreón	Canal 5	150 kW	Radio Televisión
23	6	XHOAH-TDT	Torreón	Canal 6 (Milenio Televisión, CGTN En Español, Popcorn Central)	47.5 kW	Multimedios Televisión
18	7	XHGZP-TDT	Torreón	Azteca 7 (a+)	187.38 kW	Televisión Azteca
26	9	XHTOB-TDT	Torreón	Nu9ve	150 kW	Teleimagen del Noroeste
22	14	XHSPO-TDT	Torreón (Note: The XHSPO transmitter is co-sited with Canal Once in Gómez Palacio, Durango.)	Canal Catorce	21.93 kW	Sistema Público de Radiodifusión del Estado Mexicano

== Colima ==
RF	VC	Call sign	Location	Network/name	ERP	Concessionaire
18	1	XHKF-TDT	Atenquique, Jal. Colima (Cerro La Cumbre) (Note: Primary transmitter at Atenquique on Nevado de Colima. Shadow transmitter in Colima.)	Azteca Uno (adn40)	24.14 kW; 9.42 kW	Televisión Azteca
16	2	XHBZ-TDT	Colima; Manzanillo; Cd. Guzmán, Jal.	Las Estrellas (FOROtv)	54 kW; 30 kW; 15 kW	Televimex
27	3	XHCTCO-TDT	Colima	Imagen Televisión (Excélsior TV)	50 kW	Cadena Tres I, S.A. de C.V.
17	5	XHCC-TDT	Colima; Manzanillo (RF 14); Cd. Guzmán, Jal.	Canal 5	54 kW; 30 kW; 15 kW	Radio Televisión
19	7	XHCOL-TDT	Atenquique, Jal. Colima (Cerro La Cumbre)	Azteca 7 (a+)	24.25 kW; 9.44 kW	Televisión Azteca
26	9	XHCKW-TDT	Colima	Nu9ve	54 kW	Teleimagen del Noroeste
11	12	XHCPAL-TDT	Colima	Canal 12	1.15 kW	Gobierno del Estado de Colima
21	14	XHSPRCO-TDT	Colima	SPR multiplex (11.1 Canal Once, 14.1 Canal Catorce, 14.2 Ingenio Tv, 20.1 TV UNAM, 22.1 Canal 22, 45.1 Canal del Congreso)	5.25 kW	Sistema Público de Radiodifusión del Estado Mexicano
21	2	XHIOC-TDT	Isla Socorro	Las Estrellas	2 kW	Televimex
21	1	XHDR-TDT	Manzanillo	Azteca Uno (adn40)	10.47 kW	Televisión Azteca
31	7	XHNCI-TDT	Manzanillo	Azteca 7	12.24 kW	Televisión Azteca
36	9	XHMAW-TDT	Manzanillo	Nu9ve	35 kW	Teleimagen del Noroeste
13	12	XHPBMZ-TDT	Manzanillo	Canal 12	17.208 kW	Gobierno del Estado de Colima
22	1	XHTCA-TDT	Tecomán	Azteca Uno (adn40)	4.560 kW	Televisión Azteca
23	2/5	XHTEC-TDT	Tecomán/Armería	Las Estrellas (Canal 5)	33 kW	Televimex
29	7	XHTCO-TDT	Tecomán	Azteca 7 (a+)	4.29 kW	Televisión Azteca

== Mexico City ==
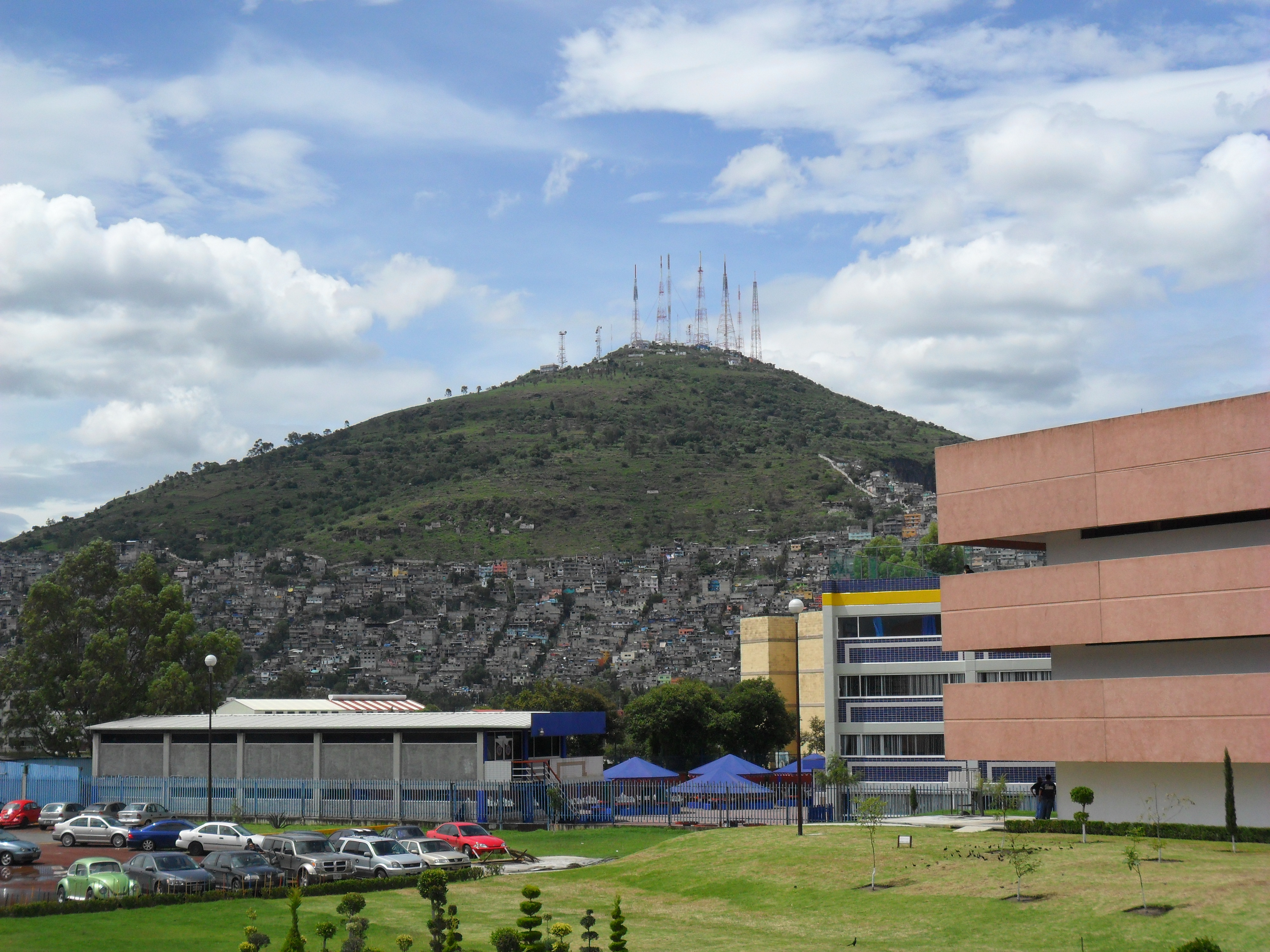
Cerro del Chiquihuite in Mexico City, the location for transmitters of most of Mexico City's TV and FM stations.

RF	VC	Call sign	Location	Network/name	ERP	Concessionaire
25	1	XHDF-TDT	Cerro del Chiquihuite	Azteca Uno (Azteca Uno -1)	468.030 kW	Televisión Azteca
32	2	XEW-TDT	Pico Tres Padres (Note: This transmitter location is within the State of Mexico, but the station is licensed to Mexico City.)	Las Estrellas	270 kW	Televimex
29	3	XHCTMX-TDT	Cerro del Chiquihuite	Imagen Televisión (Excélsior TV)	295.411 kW	Cadena Tres I, S.A. de C.V.
15	4	XHTV-TDT	Pico Tres Padres	N+ Foro	270 kW	Televimex
31	5	XHGC-TDT	Pico Tres Padres	Canal 5	270 kW	Radio Televisión
27	6	XHTDMX-TDT	Cerro del Chiquihuite	Canal 6 (Milenio Televisión, CGTN En Español, Popcorn Central)	170 kW	Televisión Digital
24	7	XHIMT-TDT	Cerro del Chiquihuite; Toluca	Azteca 7 (a+)	464.42 kW; 59.046 kW	Televisión Azteca
28	8	XHFAMX-TDT	Cerro del Chiquihuite	Heraldo Televisión (8.2 TV, Unife, Anesma)	300.512 kW	Heraldo Media Group (R.R. Televisión y Valores para la Innovación S.A. de C.V.)
22	9	XEQ-TDT	Pico Tres Padres	Nu9ve	270 kW	Teleimagen del Noroeste
33	11	XEIPN-TDT (Note: Same concession as XEIPN-TDT (3), Jocotitlán, Mex.)	Cerro del Chiquihuite	Canal Once (Once Niñas y Niños)	104.05 kW	Instituto Politécnico Nacional
30	14	XHSPR-TDT	Cerro del Chiquihuite	Canal Catorce (aprende+, TV Migrante)	116.26 kW	Sistema Público de Radiodifusión del Estado Mexicano
11	20	XHUNAM-TDT	Cerro del Chiquihuite	TV UNAM	170 kW	Universidad Nacional Autónoma de México
21	21	XHCDM-TDT	Cerro del Chiquihuite	Capital 21 (Congreso TV)	133.57 kW	Gobierno de la Ciudad de México
23	22	XEIMT-TDT	Cerro del Chiquihuite	Canal 22 (MX Nuestro Cine)	116.49 kW	Secretaría de Cultura (Televisión Metropolitana, S.A. de C.V.)
34	34	XHPTP-TDT (Note: The primary localities to serve for this station, owned by the government of the State of Mexico, are Atizapán, Coacalco, Cuautitlán Izcalli, Tlalnepantla, and Villa de las Flores, but the station covers the entirety of Mexico City as well.)	Pico Tres Padres	Televisión Mexiquense (Mexiquense Noticias, Mexiquense Noticias -1)	400 kW	Gobierno del Estado de México
26	40	XHTVM-TDT	Cerro del Chiquihuite	adn Noticias (Azteca Uno -2)	513.05 kW	Televisora del Valle de México
18	45	XHHCU-TDT	Cerro del Chiquihuite	Canal del Congreso (Canal del Congreso Senado, Canal del Congreso Diputados)	179.14 kW	Congreso de la Unión
2	28	XHCSBO-TDT	Cerro del Chiquihuite	Canal 28	1.250 kW	Sistema Regional de Televisión, A.C.
13	19	XHSCAG-TDT				Comunicadores Comunitarios del Arte y la Cultura, A.C.
17	26	XHCSAA-TDT				RYSM, A.C.

== Durango ==
RF	VC	Call sign	Location	Network/name	ERP	Concessionaire
22	1/7	XHVEL-TDT	Cuéncame	Azteca Uno (Azteca 7)	4.57 kW	Televisión Azteca
26	1	XHDB-TDT	Durango	Azteca Uno (adn40)	12.83 kW	Televisión Azteca
21	2	XHDI-TDT	Durango; Santiago Papasquiaro (RF 17)	Las Estrellas (FOROtv)	94 kW; 50 kW	Televisa
24	3	XHCTDG-TDT	Durango	Imagen Televisión (Excélsior TV)	37.485 kW	Cadena Tres I, S.A. de C.V.
22	4	XHUAD-TDT	Durango	TV Lobo	4 kW	Fomento Educativo y Cultural Francisco de Ibarra, A.C.
17	5	XHDUH-TDT	Durango	Canal 5 (13.1 Nu9ve Durango)	94 kW	Televisa
29	6	XHMTDU-TDT	Durango	Canal 6 (Milenio Televisión, Popcorn Central)	75 kW	Multimedios Televisión
32	7	XHDRG-TDT	Durango; Santiago Papasquiaro	Azteca 7 (a+)	12.7 kW	Televisión Azteca
11	8	XHUNES-TDT	Durango	España TV	1.48 kW	Universidad Autónoma España de Durango
28	9	XHUJED-TDT	Durango	TV UJED	10 kW	Universidad Juárez del Estado de Durango
36	10	XHA-TDT	Durango	Canal 10	50 kW	TV Diez Durango
33	11	XHDGO-TDT	Durango	Canal Once (Once Niñas y Niños)	10.04 kW	Instituto Politécnico Nacional
30	12	XHND-TDT	Durango	Canal Doce	14 kW	Organizacion Editorial de Mexico
12	14	XHCPBJ-TDT	Durango	Canal Catorce	52.468 kW	Sistema Público de Radiodifusión del Estado Mexicano
7	15	XHFGL-TDT	Durango	Canal 15	32.280 kW	Fundación Garza Limón
34	11	XHGPD-TDT	Gómez Palacio	Canal Once (Once Niñas y Niños)	14.23 kW	Instituto Politécnico Nacional
19	1	XHGVH-TDT	Guadalupe Victoria	Azteca Uno (adn40)	4.83 kW	Televisión Azteca
25	7	XHSPC-TDT	San Pedro	Azteca 7	5.09 kW	Televisión Azteca
27	1	XHPAP-TDT	Santiago Papasquiaro	Azteca Uno (adn40)	1.79 kW	Televisión Azteca
22	15	XHRCSP-TDT	Santiago Papasquiaro	Canal 15	22.56 kW	Radio Comunicación Gamar

== Guanajuato ==
RF	VC	Call sign	Location	Network/name	ERP	Concessionaire
35	4	XHCPAM-TDT	Acámbaro	TV4 (4.2, 4.3)	0.6353 kW	Gobierno del Estado de Guanajuato
24	4	XHCPAZ-TDT	Atarjea	TV4 (4.2, 4.3)	.12 kW	Gobierno del Estado de Guanajuato
33	1	XHMAS-TDT	Celaya; Guanajuato; León (RF 16); La Piedad, Mich.	Azteca Uno (adn40)	100.27 kW; 5.17 kW; 71.36 kW; 3.9 kW	Televisión Azteca
30	4	XHCPBE-TDT	Celaya	TV4 (4.2, 4.3)	29.9 kW	Gobierno del Estado de Guanajuato
17	7	XHCCG-TDT	Celaya; Guanajuato; León (RF 14); La Piedad, Mich.	Azteca 7 (a+)	99.33 kW; 5.17 kW; 71.49 kW; 10.31 kW	Televisión Azteca
20	14	XHSPRCE-TDT	Celaya	SPR multiplex (11.1 Canal Once, 14.1 Canal Catorce, 20.1 TV UNAM, 22.1 Canal 22)	14.74 kW	Sistema Público de Radiodifusión del Estado Mexicano
19	15	XHCEP-TDT	Celaya	Local independent	.5 kW	Patronato de Televisión Cultural de Guanajuato, A.C.
25	4	XHCPBG-TDT	Comonfort	TV4 (4.2, 4.3)	.15 kW	Gobierno del Estado de Guanajuato
24	4	XHCPBH-TDT	Coroneo	TV4 (4.2, 4.3)	.4776 kW	Gobierno del Estado de Guanajuato
24	4	XHCPDB-TDT	Doctor Mora	TV4 (4.2, 4.3)	.029 kW	Gobierno del Estado de Guanajuato
35	4	XHCPDK-TDT	Dolores Hidalgo	TV4 (4.2, 4.3)	1.032 kW	Gobierno del Estado de Guanajuato
35	4	XHCPDL-TDT	Guanajuato	TV4 (4.2, 4.3)	0.641 kW	Gobierno del Estado de Guanajuato
35	4	XHCPDM-TDT	Huanímaro	TV4 (4.2, 4.3)	.029 kW	Gobierno del Estado de Guanajuato
31	4	XHCPDN-TDT	Jerécuaro	TV4 (4.2, 4.3)	.03228 kW	Gobierno del Estado de Guanajuato
35	4	XHCPNO-TDT	Juventino Rosas	TV4 (4.2, 4.3)	.29 kW	Gobierno del Estado de Guanajuato
27	2	XHLGT-TDT	León	Las Estrellas (N+ Foro)	180 kW	Televimex
26	3	XHCTLE-TDT	León	Imagen Televisión (Excélsior TV)	10 kW	Cadena Tres I, S.A. de C.V.
25	4	XHCPDQ-TDT	León	TV4 (4.2, 4.3)	336 kW	Gobierno del Estado de Guanajuato
24	5	XHLEJ-TDT	León; Lagos de Moreno, Jal.	Canal 5	180 kW; 19 kW	Radio Televisión
31	6	XHLGG-TDT	Cerro Los Tenamastes, Jal. (Note: This site is on the Jalisco-Guanajuato state line to the north of León.); León	Canal 6 (Milenio Televisión, CGTN En Español, Popcorn Central)	47.5 kW; 70 kW	Multimedios Televisión
23	12	XHL-TDT	León; Celaya-Irapuato (VC 23)	Televisa Regional (9.1 Nu9ve)	180 kW; 50 kW; 19 kW	Televisora de Occidente
36	13	XHTMGJ-TDT	León; Lagos de Moreno, Jal.	Telsusa (Canal 13)	100 kW	Telsusa Televisión México
34	14	XHSPRLA-TDT	León	SPR multiplex (11.1 Canal Once, 14.1 Canal Catorce, 20.1 TV UNAM, 22.1 Canal 22)	39.02 kW	Sistema Público de Radiodifusión del Estado Mexicano
26	4	XHCPDR-TDT	Ocampo	TV4 (4.2, 4.3)	0.05 kW	Gobierno del Estado de Guanajuato
21	4	XHCPDS-TDT	Pénjamo	TV4 (4.2, 4.3)	.5 kW	Gobierno del Estado de Guanajuato
31	4	XHCPDT-TDT	Salvatierra	TV4 (4.2, 4.3)	0.215 kW	Gobierno del Estado de Guanajuato
30	4	XHCPDU-TDT	San Diego de la Unión	TV4 (4.2, 4.3)	1 kW	Gobierno del Estado de Guanajuato
33	4	XHCPDV-TDT	San Felipe	TV4 (4.2, 4.3)	.4356 kW	Gobierno del Estado de Guanajuato
30	4	XHCPDW-TDT	San José Iturbide	TV4 (4.2, 4.3)	1.076 kW	Gobierno del Estado de Guanajuato
25	4	XHCPDX-TDT	San Luis de la Paz	TV4 (4.2, 4.3)	.29 kW	Gobierno del Estado de Guanajuato
24	4	XHCPDY-TDT	San Miguel de Allende	TV4 (4.2, 4.3)	3.8 kW	Gobierno del Estado de Guanajuato
30	4	XHCPDZ-TDT	Santa Catarina	TV4 (4.2, 4.3)	.2512 kW	Gobierno del Estado de Guanajuato
25	4	XHCPEA-TDT	Santiago Maravatio	TV4 (4.2, 4.3)	.05 kW	Gobierno del Estado de Guanajuato
21	4	XHCPEB-TDT	Tarandacuao	TV4 (4.2, 4.3)	.1452 kW	Gobierno del Estado de Guanajuato
25	4	XHCPEC-TDT	Tarimoro	TV4 (4.2, 4.3)	.29 kW	Gobierno del Estado de Guanajuato
23	4	XHCPED-TDT	Tierra Blanca	TV4 (4.2, 4.3)	.1264 kW	Gobierno del Estado de Guanajuato
27	4	XHCPEE-TDT	Victoria	TV4 (4.2, 4.3)	.029 kW	Gobierno del Estado de Guanajuato
22	4	XHCPEF-TDT	Xichu	TV4 (4.2, 4.3)	.3 kW	Gobierno del Estado de Guanajuato

=== Defunct stations ===
- XHGSM-TDT RF 23, virtual 8 (formerly analog 4) (2000–2021)

== Guerrero ==
RF	VC	Call sign	Location	Network/name	ERP	Concessionaire
14	1	XHIE-TDT	Acapulco	Azteca Uno (adn40)	44.39 kW	Televisión Azteca
32	2	XHAP-TDT	Acapulco	Las Estrellas (FOROtv)	15 kW	Televimex
21	3	XHCTAC-TDT	Acapulco	Imagen Televisión (Excélsior TV)	30 kW	Cadena Tres I, S.A. de C.V.
33	4	XHCPFU-TDT	Acapulco	Radio y Televisión de Guerrero	5.79 kW	Gobierno del Estado de Guerrero
23	5	XHAL-TDT	Acapulco	Canal 5	15 kW	Radio Televisión
36	7	XHACC-TDT	Acapulco	Azteca 7 (a+)	36.6 kW	Televisión Azteca
22	9	XHACZ-TDT	Acapulco	Nu9ve	15 kW	Teleimagen del Noroeste
30		XHSPG-TDT	Acapulco		32.92 kW	Sistema Público de Radiodifusión del Estado Mexicano
24	1	XHCER-TDT	Chilpancingo	Azteca Uno (adn40)	17.66 kW	Televisión Azteca
20	2	XHCK-TDT	Chilpancingo	Las Estrellas (FOROtv)	50 kW	Televimex
25	3	XHCTCP-TDT	Chilpancingo	Imagen Televisión (Excélsior TV)	20 kW	Cadena Tres I, S.A. de C.V.
35	4	XHCPFW-TDT	Chilpancingo	Radio y Televisión de Guerrero	0.4349 kW	Gobierno del Estado de Guerrero
34	5	XHCHN-TDT	Chilpancingo	Canal 5 (Nu9ve)	50 kW	Radio Televisión
28	7	XHCHL-TDT	Chilpancingo	Azteca 7 (a+)	17.58 kW	Televisión Azteca
15		XHCPCQ-TDT	Chilpancingo		46.253 kW	Sistema Público de Radiodifusión del Estado Mexicano
30	1	XHIR-TDT	Iguala	Azteca Uno (adn40)	6.19 kW	Televisión Azteca
26	2	XHIGG-TDT	Iguala	Las Estrellas	43 kW	Televimex
31	5	XHIGN-TDT	Iguala	Canal 5	43 kW	Radio Televisión
29	7	XHTUX-TDT	Iguala	Azteca 7	6.16 kW	Televisión Azteca
26	2	XHOMT-TDT	Ometepec	Las Estrellas	43 kW	Televimex
23	1	XHIB-TDT	Taxco	Azteca Uno (adn40)	7.18 kW	Televisión Azteca
34	2	XHTGG-TDT	Tecpan de Galeana	Las Estrellas	24 kW	Televimex
22	1	XHDU-TDT	Zihuatanejo	Azteca Uno (adn40)	42.5 kW	Televisión Azteca
27	2	XHIZG-TDT	Ixtapa and Zihuatanejo	Las Estrellas	40 kW	Televimex
28	5	XHIXG-TDT	Ixtapa and Zihuatanejo	Canal 5	40 kW	Radio Televisión
25	7	XHIXZ-TDT	Zihuatanejo	Azteca 7	42.38 kW	Televisión Azteca

== Hidalgo ==
RF	VC	Call sign	Location	Network/name	ERP	Concessionaire
27	12	XHHUH-TDT	Huejutla de Reyes	Radio y Televisión de Hidalgo	16.28 kW	Gobierno del Estado de Hidalgo
22	12	XHIXM-TDT	Ixmiquilpan	Radio y Televisión de Hidalgo	5.28 kW	Gobierno del Estado de Hidalgo
16	3	XHCTIX-TDT	Ixmiquilpan (Pachuca); Tula de Allende	Imagen Televisión (Excélsior TV)	20 kW; 35 kW	Cadena Tres I, S.A. de C.V.
36	7	XHPHG-TDT	Pachuca	Azteca 7 (a+)	3.97 kW	Televisión Azteca
21	12	XHPAH-TDT	Pachuca	Radio y Televisión de Hidalgo	44.7 kW	Gobierno del Estado de Hidalgo
8	13	XHPEAH-TDT	Pachuca	SUMA TV	5 kW	Universidad Autónoma del Estado de Hidalgo
23	7/1	XHAFC-TDT	San Nicolas Jacala/ Agua Fria Chica	Azteca 7 (Azteca Uno)	1.07 kW	Televisión Azteca
23	12	XHTOH-TDT	Tepeapulco	Radio y Televisión de Hidalgo	4.18 kW	Gobierno del Estado de Hidalgo
14	12	XHTHI-TDT	Tula	Radio y Televisión de Hidalgo	10.32 kW	Gobierno del Estado de Hidalgo
22	12	XHTUH-TDT	Tulancingo	Radio y Televisión de Hidalgo	3.31 kW	Gobierno del Estado de Hidalgo
10	14	XHCPCR-TDT	Tulancingo	Canal Catorce	0.5 kW	Sistema Público de Radiodifusión del Estado Mexicano
24	1/7	XHTGN-TDT	Tulancingo	Azteca Uno (Azteca 7)	9.99 kW	Televisión Azteca
34	2/5	XHTWH-TDT	Tulancingo; Huauchinango, Puebla	Las Estrellas (Canal 5)	45 kW; 0.38 W	Televimex

== Jalisco ==
RF	VC	Call sign	Location	Network/name	ERP	Concessionaire
36	2	XHATJ-TDT	Atotonilco El Alto	Las Estrellas	24 kW	Televimex
19	5	XHATU-TDT	Atotonilco El Alto	Canal 5	24 kW	Radio Televisión
32	2	XHANT-TDT	Autlán de Navarro	Las Estrellas (N+ Foro)	43 kW	Televimex
23	5	XHAUM-TDT	Autlán de Navarro	Canal 5	43 kW	Radio Televisión
33	1	XHJAL-TDT	Guadalajara	Azteca Uno (adn Noticias)	192.69 kW	Televisión Azteca
24	2	XHGA-TDT	Guadalajara	Las Estrellas (N+ Foro)	150 kW	Televimex
28	3	XHCTGD-TDT	Guadalajara	Imagen Televisión (Excélsior TV)	100 kW	Cadena Tres I, S.A. de C.V.
29	4	XHG-TDT	Guadalajara; Ciudad Guzmán	Televisa Regional (Másvisión)	150 kW; 15 kW	Televisora de Occidente
22	5	XHGUE-TDT	Guadalajara	Canal 5	150 kW	Radio Televisión
34	6	XHTDJA-TDT	Guadalajara	Canal 6 (Milenio Televisión, CGTN En Español, Popcorn Central)	200.009 kW	Televisión Digital
31	7	XHSFJ-TDT	Guadalajara; Arandas	Azteca 7 (a+)	193.13 kW; 14.24 kW	Televisión Azteca
26	9	XEWO-TDT	Guadalajara	Nu9ve	150 kW	Televisora de Occidente
9	10	XHQMGU-TDT	Guadalajara	Quiero TV (Quiero TV -2 horas, Inova)	50 kW	Quiero Media
23	11	XHPBGD-TDT	Guadalajara	Canal Once (Once Niñas y Niños)	124.996 kW	Instituto Politécnico Nacional
35	13	XEDK-TDT	Guadalajara	Canal 13 (TN23)	140 kW	Telsusa
20	14	XHSPRGA-TDT	Guadalajara	SPR multiplex (14.1 Canal Catorce, 20.1 TV UNAM, 22.1 Canal 22)	29.95 kW	Sistema Público de Radiodifusión del Estado Mexicano
25	17	XHCPEH-TDT	Guadalajara	Jalisco TV (Jalisco TV, Canal Parlamento)	135.55 kW	Gobierno del Estado de Jalisco
27	44	XHCPCT-TDT	Guadalajara	Canal 44 (44 Noticias)	205.5 kW	Universidad de Guadalajara
24	17	XHCPEG-TDT	Ciudad Guzmán	Jalisco TV	3.19 kW	Gobierno del Estado de Jalisco
11	44	XHPBGZ-TDT	Ciudad Guzmán	Canal 44	5.522 kW	Universidad de Guadalajara
25	2/5	XHLBU-TDT	La Barca	Las Estrellas (Canal 5)	22 kW	Televimex
9	44	XHPBLM-TDT	Lagos de Moreno	Canal 44 (44 Noticias)	3.13 kW	Universidad de Guadalajara
25	1	XHGJ-TDT	Puerto Vallarta	Azteca Uno (adn Noticias)	19.27 kW	Televisión Azteca
36	2	XHPVT-TDT	Puerto Vallarta	Las Estrellas	33 kW	Televimex
35	5	XHPVE-TDT	Puerto Vallarta	Canal 5 (Televisa Regional)	33 kW	Radio Televisión
23	7	XHPVJ-TDT	Puerto Vallarta	Azteca 7 (a+)	18.42 kW	Televisión Azteca
27	10	XHCPPV-TDT	Puerto Vallarta	TV Mar	90.072 kW	Compañía Periodística Sudcaliforniana
21	17	XHCPEI-TDT	Puerto Vallarta	Jalisco TV	23.37 kW	Gobierno del Estado de Jalisco
8	44	XHCPAF-TDT	Puerto Vallarta	Canal 44 (44 Noticias)	6.644 kW	Universidad de Guadalajara

== State of Mexico ==
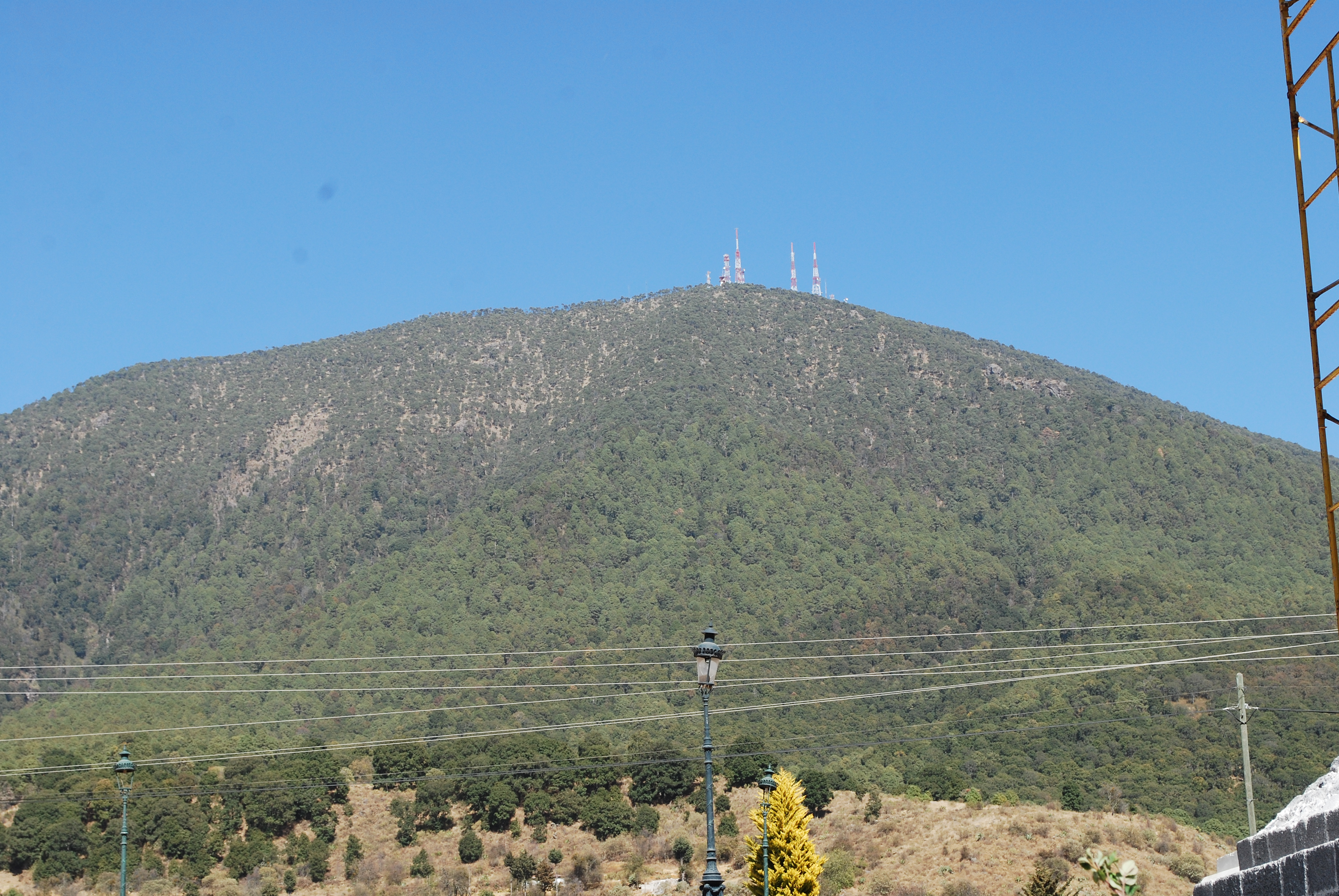
Almost all Toluca stations transmit from Jocotitlán

RF	VC	Call sign	Location	Network/name	ERP	Concessionaire
36	2	XHTM-TDT	Altzomoni; Tejupilco de Hidalgo; Taxco, Gro. Pachuca, Hgo. Cuernavaca, Mor. United States. Tlaxcala, Tlax.	Las Estrellas (FOROtv)	236 kW; 20 kW; 21 kW; 8 kW; 45 kW; 20 kW; 30 kW	Televimex
14	5	XEX-TDT	Altzomoni; Tejupilco de Hidalgo; Taxco, Gro. Pachuca, Hgo. Cuernavaca, Mor. San Martín Texmelucan, Pue. United States.	Canal 5	236 kW; 20 kW; 21 kW; 8 kW; 45 kW; 20 kW; 30 kW	Radio Televisión
16	9	XHATZ-TDT	Altzomoni; United States	Nu9ve	236 kW	Teleimagen del Noroeste
27	1	XHXEM-TDT	Jocotitlán (Toluca); Ixmiquilpan, Hgo. (2016–2018); Zitácuaro, Mich.	Azteca Uno (adn40)	92.8 kW; 17.07 kW; 47.07 kW	Televisión Azteca
19	2	XHTOL-TDT	Toluca/Jocotitlán	Las Estrellas (FOROtv)	45 kW	Televimex
14	3	XHCTTO-TDT	Toluca,United States.	Imagen Televisión (Excélsior TV)	26.261 kW	Cadena Tres I, S.A. de C.V.
36	5	XHTOK-TDT	Toluca	Canal 5	280 kW	Radio Televisión
35	7	XHLUC-TDT	Jocotitlán (Toluca); Ixmiquilpan, Hgo.	Azteca 7 (a+)	92.02 kW; 16.93 kW	Televisión Azteca
22	9	XEQ-TDT (Note: This station, while licensed as a repeater of XEQ in Mexico City, airs its own locally-targeted programming under the name Nu9ve Estado de México. Repeaters may air up to 25 percent different programming from their parent stations.)	Toluca/Jocotitlán	Nu9ve Estado de México	200 kW	Teleimagen del Noroeste
30	14	XHSPREM-TDT	Jocotitlán	SPR multiplex (11.1 Canal Once, 14.1 Canal Catorce, 20.1 TV UNAM, 22.1 Canal 22)	168.68 kW	Sistema Público de Radiodifusión del Estado Mexicano
20	34	XHGEM-TDT	Toluca/Jocotitlán	Mexiquense Televisión (Mexiquense Noticias, Mexiquense Noticias -1)	250 kW	Gobierno del Estado de México
21	11	XHCPDG-TDT	Valle de Bravo; Mexico City, Mexico	Canal Once (Once Niñas y Niños)	2.82 kW	Instituto Politécnico Nacional

== Michoacán ==
RF	VC	Call sign	Location	Network/name	ERP	Concessionaire
25	2	XHAPN-TDT	Apatzingán	Las Estrellas	47 kW	Televimex
21	5	XHAPZ-TDT	Apatzingán	Canal 5	47 kW	Radio Televisión
26	16	XHAPA-TDT	Apatzingán	SMRTV	.151 kW	Gobierno del Estado de Michoacán
21	2/5	XHCHM-TDT	Ciudad Hidalgo	Las Estrellas (Canal 5)	14 kW	Televimex
34	16	XHMHG-TDT	Ciudad Hidalgo	SMRTV	.114 kW	Gobierno del Estado de Michoacán
11	16	XHPBHU-TDT	Huetamo	SMRTV	1.196 kW	Gobierno del Estado de Michoacán
21	16	XHMJI-TDT	Jiquilpan	SMRTV	.226 kW	Gobierno del Estado de Michoacán
22	16	XHPMG-TDT	La Piedad	SMRTV	.146 kW	Gobierno del Estado de Michoacán
26	1/7	XHLCM-TDT	Lazaro Cárdenas	Azteca Uno (Azteca 7)	9.18 kW	Televisión Azteca
30	2	XHLBT-TDT	Lazaro Cárdenas	Las Estrellas	25 kW	Televimex
33	5	XHLAC-TDT	Lazaro Cárdenas	Canal 5	25 kW	Radio Televisión
29	16	XHLAM-TDT	Lazaro Cárdenas	SMRTV	.151 kW	Gobierno del Estado de Michoacán
31	2	XHLRM-TDT	Los Reyes	Las Estrellas	22 kW	Televimex
16	2	XHKW-TDT	Morelia	Las Estrellas	47.2 kW	Jose Humberto y Loucille Martínez Morales
34	3	XHCTMO-TDT	Morelia	Imagen Televisión (Excélsior TV)	50 kW	Cadena Tres I, S.A. de C.V.
18	5	XHFX-TDT	Morelia	Canal 5	47.2 kW	Televisión de Michoacán
29	5	XHMOW-TDT	Morelia (Cerro Burro)	Canal 5 (9.1 Nu9ve)	338 kW	Radio Televisión
32	7	XHBUR-TDT	Morelia	Azteca 7 (a+)	257.89 kW	Televisión Azteca
19	14	XHSPRMO-TDT	Morelia	SPR multiplex (11.1 Canal Once, 14.1 Canal Catorce, 20.1 TV UNAM, 22.1 Canal 22)	2.00 kW	Sistema Público de Radiodifusión del Estado Mexicano
14	16	XHMOR-TDT	Morelia	SMRTV	2.951 kW	Gobierno del Estado de Michoacán
24	1/7	XHCBM-TDT	Pátzcuaro (Cerro Burro); Morelia; Zamora; Apatzingán	Azteca Uno (Azteca 7)	64.71 kW; 87.894 kW; 14.43 kW; 17.377 kW	Televisión Azteca
25	2/5	XHPUM-TDT	Puruándiro	Las Estrellas (Canal 5)	37 kW	Televimex
34	16	XHMPU-TDT	Puruandiro	SMRTV	.114 kW	Gobierno del Estado de Michoacán
14	2/5	XHSAM-TDT	Sahuayo-Jiquilpan	Las Estrellas (Canal 5)	20 kW	Televimex
34	16	XHMTC-TDT	Tacámbaro	SMRTV	.114 kW	Gobierno del Estado de Michoacán
30	2	XHURT-TDT	Uruapan (Cerro Burro)	Las Estrellas (FOROtv)	338 kW	Televimex
36	3	XHCTUR-TDT	Uruapan	Imagen Televisión (Excélsior TV)	0.5 kW	Cadena Tres I, S.A. de C.V.
15	12	XHJGMI-TDT	Uruapan	Multimedios Michoacán	0.1 kW	José Guadalupe Manuel Trejo García
27	13	XHBG-TDT	Uruapan; Zamora	Telsusa (Canal 13)	300 kW; 30 kW	Telsusa Televisión México, S.A. de C.V.
14	14	XHSPRUM-TDT	Uruapan	SPR multiplex (11.1 Canal Once, 14.1 Canal Catorce, 14.2 Ingenio Tv, 20.1 TV UNAM, 22.1 Canal 22, 45.1 Canal del Congreso)	9.43 kW	Sistema Público de Radiodifusión del Estado Mexicano
34	16	XHURU-TDT	Uruapan	SMRTV	.147 kW	Gobierno del Estado de Michoacán
34	16	XHMZA-TDT	Zacapu	SMRTV	.114 kW	Gobierno del Estado de Michoacán
29	2	XHZMT-TDT	Zamora	Las Estrellas (FOROtv)	32 kW	Televimex
25	5	XHZAM-TDT	Zamora	Canal 5 (9.1 Nu9ve)	32 kW	Radio Televisión
23	7	XHRAM-TDT	Zamora; Uruapan; Purépero	Azteca 7 (a+)	30.85 kW; 29.93 kW	Televisión Azteca
34	16	XHTZA-TDT	Zamora	SMRTV	.295 kW	Gobierno del Estado de Michoacán
36	2	XHZIM-TDT	Zinapécuaro	Las Estrellas	30 kW	Televimex
25	2/5	XHZMM-TDT	Zitácuaro	Las Estrellas (Canal 5)	10 kW	Televimex
15	7	XHTCM-TDT	Zitácuaro; Ciudad Hidalgo	Azteca 7	16.21 kW; 14.9 kW	Televisión Azteca
22	16	XHMZI-TDT	Zitácuaro	SMRTV	.113 kW	Gobierno del Estado de Michoacán

== Morelos ==
RF	VC	Call sign	Location	Network/name	ERP	Concessionaire
27	1	XHCUR-TDT	Cuernavaca	Azteca Uno (adn40)	239.83 kW	Televisión Azteca
23	3	XHCTCU-TDT	Cuernavaca	Imagen Televisión (Excélsior TV)	80 kW	Cadena Tres I, S.A. de C.V.
22	7	XHCUV-TDT	Cuernavaca	Azteca 7 (a+)	238.21 kW	Televisión Azteca
28	9	XHCUM-TDT	Cuernavaca	Nu9ve	45 kW	Teleimagen del Noroeste
10		XHFE-TDT	Cuernavaca			Patronato para el Fomento de la Educación, S.C.
20	11/14	XHCPDH-TDT	Cuernavaca	Canal Once (Once Niñas y Niños, Canal Catorce)	22.92 kW	Instituto Politécnico Nacional
19	15	XHCMO-TDT	Cuernavaca	El Canal de Morelos	40 kW	Gobierno del Estado de Morelos

== Nayarit ==
RF	VC	Call sign	Location	Network/name	ERP	Concessionaire
32	2	XHACN-TDT	Acaponeta-Tecuala	Las Estrellas (Canal 5)	15 kW	Televimex
27	8	XHRTNA-TDT	Acaponeta-Tecuala	8 NTV	13.968 kW	Radio-Televisión Digital de Nayarit
23	2	XHIMN-TDT	Islas Marías	Las Estrellas	3.5 kW	Televimex
5		XHCPCV-TDT	Nuevo Vallarta		4.183 kW	Sistema Público de Radiodifusión del Estado Mexicano
18	2	XHSEN-TDT	Santiago Ixcuintla	Las Estrellas	17 kW	Televimex
30	1	XHAF-TDT	Tepic	Azteca Uno (adn40)	24 kW	Televisión Azteca
28	2	XHTEN-TDT	Tepic	Las Estrellas (FOROtv)	55 kW	Televimex
22	3	XHCTNY-TDT	Tepic	Imagen Televisión (Excélsior TV)	20 kW	Cadena Tres I, S.A. de C.V.
36	4	XHKG-TDT	Tepic	XHKG TV Nayarit	20.04 kW	Lucía Perez Medina, Vda. de Mondragón
33	5	XHTFL-TDT	Tepic	Canal 5 (9.1 Nu9ve)	55 kW	Radio Televisión
31	7	XHLBN-TDT	Tepic	Azteca 7 (a+)	23.970 kW	Televisión Azteca
26	8	XHNTV-TDT	Tepic	8 NTV (6.1 Multimedios Televisión, 6.2 Milenio Televisión)	29.892 kW	Radio-Televisión Digital de Nayarit
24	10	XHTPG-TDT	Tepic	10 TV Nayarit	20 kW	Gobierno del Estado de Nayarit
34	14	XHSPY-TDT	Tepic	Canal Catorce	72.518 kW	Sistema Público de Radiodifusión del Estado Mexicano

== Nuevo León ==
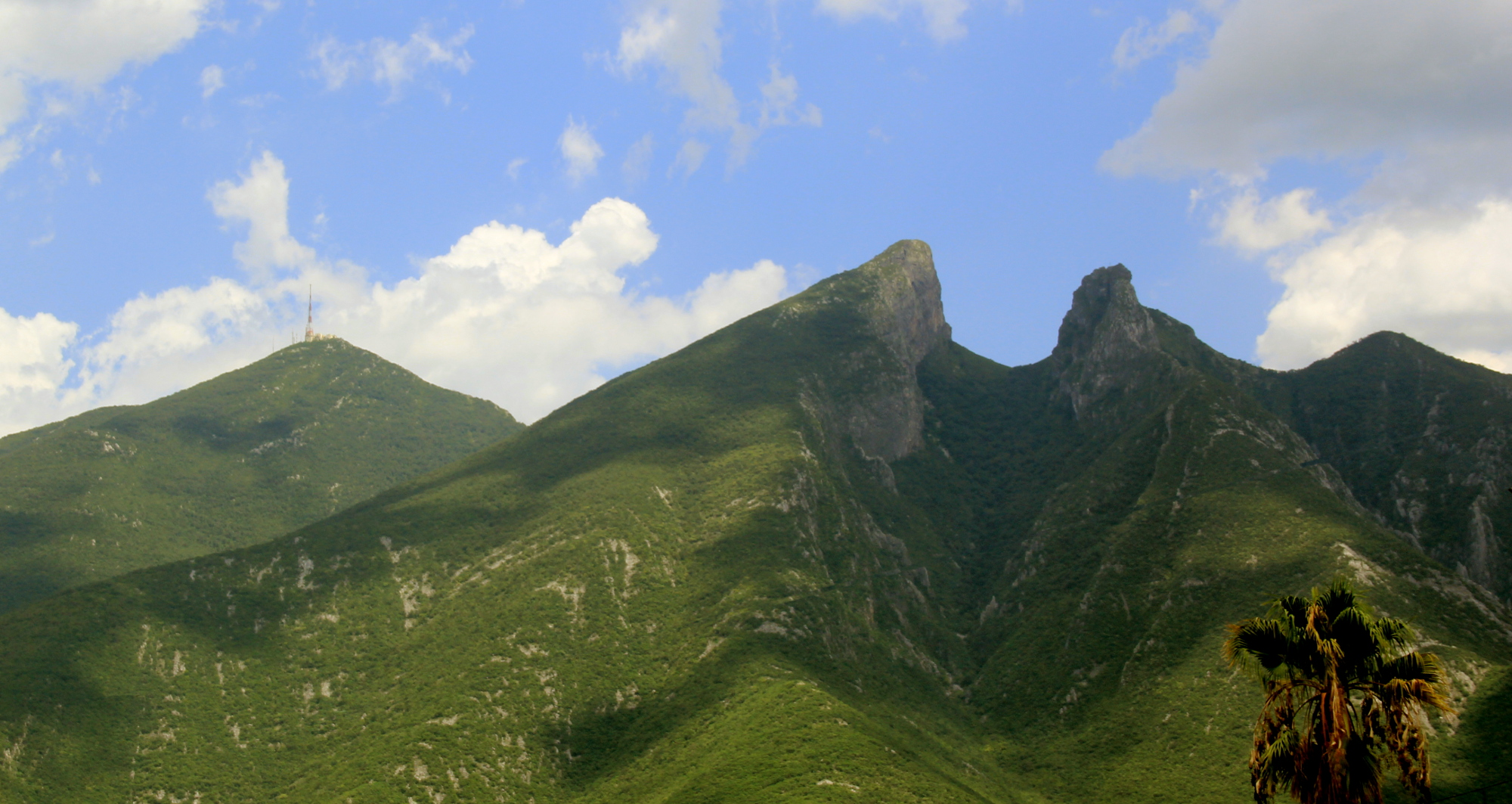
Most of Televisa's stations in Monterrey broadcast from Cerro de la Silla

RF	VC	Call sign	Location	Network/name	ERP	Concessionaire
20	13	XHTMNL-TDT	Agualeguas	Telsusa (Canal 13)	70.1 kW	Telsusa Televisión México
19	1	XHWX-TDT	Monterrey; Guadalupe (RF 12); Saltillo, Coah. Sabinas Hidalgo	Azteca Uno (adn Noticias)	429.706 kW; 9.27 kW; 13.605 kW; 8.549 kW	Televisión Azteca
23	2	XHX-TDT	Monterrey; Saltillo, Coah. Sabinas Hidalgo	Las Estrellas (N+ Foro)	200 kW; 45 kW; 4.8 kW	Televimex
22	3	XHCTMY-TDT	Monterrey	Imagen Televisión (Excélsior TV)	130 kW	Cadena Tres I, S.A. de C.V.
15	4	XEFB-TDT	Monterrey; Saltillo, Coah.	Televisa Regional	200 kW; 43 kW	Televisora de Occidente
31	5	XET-TDT	Monterrey	Canal 5	200 kW	Radio Televisión
25	6	XHAW-TDT	Monterrey; Guadalupe (RF 26); Saltillo, Coah.	Canal 6 (Milenio Televisión, RG La Deportiva TV, Popcorn Central)	120 kW; 20 kW; 37.5 kW	Televisión Digital
17	7	XHFN-TDT	Monterrey; Guadalupe (RF 11); Sabinas Hidalgo	Azteca 7 (a+)	342.072 kW; 9.292 kW; 8.588 kW	Televisión Azteca
34	8	XHCNL-TDT	Cadereyta-Monterrey	Televisa Regional	200 kW	Televisora de Occidente
32	9	XHMOY-TDT	Monterrey	Nu9ve	200 kW	Teleimagen del Noroeste
36	11	XHPBMY-TDT	Monterrey	Canal Once (Once Niñas y Niños)	60 kW	Instituto Politécnico Nacional
16	14	XHSPRMT-TDT	Monterrey	SPR multiplex (14.1 Canal Catorce, 20.1 TV UNAM, 22.1 Canal 22)	35.53 kW	Sistema Público de Radiodifusión del Estado Mexicano
28	28	XHMNL-TDT	Monterrey; (with 23 repeaters statewide)	Canal 28	139.54 kW	Gobierno del Estado de Nuevo León
35	53	XHMNU-TDT	Monterrey	Canal 53	250 kW	Universidad Autónoma de Nuevo León
36	3	XHCTSH-TDT	Sabinas Hidalgo	Imagen Televisión (Excélsior TV)	10 kW	Cadena Tres I, S.A. de C.V.

== Oaxaca ==
RF	VC	Call sign	Location	Network/name	ERP	Concessionaire
33	1	XHJN-TDT	Huajuapan de León	Azteca Uno (adn40)	22.840 kW	Televisión Azteca
31	2	XHHLO-TDT	Huajuapan de León; Tehuacán, Pue.	Las Estrellas (FOROtv)	76 kW; 36 kW	Televimex
28	3	XHCTHL-TDT	Huajuapan de León	Imagen Televisión (Excélsior TV)		Cadena Tres I, S.A. de C.V.
19	5	XHHHN-TDT	Huajuapan de León; Tehuacán, Pue.	Canal 5	76 kW; 36 kW	Radio Televisión
29	7	XHHDL-TDT	Huajuapan de León	Azteca 7	23.430 kW	Televisión Azteca
25	1	XHIG-TDT	Matías Romero (C. Palma Sola)	Azteca Uno (adn40)	48.21 kW	Televisión Azteca
21	2	XHPAO-TDT	Cerro Palma Sola	Las Estrellas	76 kW	Televimex
35	5	XHIH-TDT	Tehuantepec (C. Palma Sola)	Canal 5	76 kW	Radio Televisión
30	7	XHPSO-TDT	Matías Romero (C. Palma Sola); Salina Cruz	Azteca 7 (a+)	47.63 kW; 17.24 kW	Televisión Azteca
23	2	XHMIO-TDT	Miahuatlán de Porfirio Díaz	Las Estrellas	18 kW	Televimex
27	1	XHOXX-TDT	Oaxaca	Azteca Uno (adn40)	57.91 kW	Televisión Azteca
29	2	XHBN-TDT	Oaxaca	Las Estrellas (FOROtv)	97 kW	Televimex
16	3	XHCTOX-TDT	Oaxaca	Imagen Televisión (Excélsior TV)	120 kW	Cadena Tres I, S.A. de C.V.
32	4	XHBO-TDT	Oaxaca	Oaxaca TV	102.929 kW	Televisora XHBO
34	5	XHOXO-TDT	Oaxaca	Canal 5 (8.1 Nu9ve)	97 kW	Radio Televisión
26	7	XHDG-TDT	Oaxaca	Azteca 7 (a+)	58 kW	Televisión Azteca
36	9	XHCPBR-TDT	Oaxaca (with 15 repeaters statewide)	CORTV	20 kW	Gobierno del Estado de Oaxaca
35	14	XHSPROA-TDT	Oaxaca	SPR multiplex (11.1 Canal Once, 14.1 Canal Catorce, 20.1 TV UNAM, 22.1 Canal 22)	18.14 kW	Sistema Público de Radiodifusión del Estado Mexicano
24	1/7	XHINC-TDT	Pinotepa Nacional; San Juan Cacahuatepec	Azteca Uno (Azteca 7)	4.41 kW; 20.97 kW	Televisión Azteca
32	2	XHPNO-TDT	Pinotepa Nacional	Las Estrellas	46 kW	Televimex
34	5	XHPIX-TDT	Pinotepa Nacional	Canal 5	46 kW	Radio Televisión
36	2/5	XHPAT-TDT	Puerto Ángel	Las Estrellas (Canal 5)	24 kW	Televimex
33	1	XHPCE-TDT	Puerto Escondido	Azteca Uno (Azteca 7)	159.97 kW	Televisión Azteca
31	2/5	XHPET-TDT	Puerto Escondido	Las Estrellas (Canal 5)	21 kW	Televimex
23	7	XHJP-TDT	Puerto Escondido	Azteca 7	8.39 kW	Televisión Azteca
28	1	XHSCO-TDT	Salina Cruz	Azteca Uno (adn40)	3.33 kW	Televisión Azteca
36	7/1	XHSMT-TDT	San Miguel Tlacotepec	Azteca 7 (Azteca Uno)	1.09 kW	Televisión Azteca

== Puebla ==
RF	VC	Call sign	Location	Network/name	ERP	Concessionaire
24	1	XHPUR-TDT	Puebla; Actipan; Atlixco; Tlaxcala, Tlax.	Azteca Uno (adn40)	53.51 kW; 17.75 kW; 2.75 kW; 21.96 kW	Televisión Azteca
21	3	XHCTPU-TDT	Puebla; Tlaxcala, Tlax.	Imagen Televisión (Excélsior TV)	100 kW	Cadena Tres I, S.A. de C.V.
29	4	XHP-TDT	Puebla; Tlaxcala, Tlax.	Televisa Regional	95 kW; 30 kW	Televisora de Occidente
15	6	XHMTPU-TDT	Puebla; Tlaxcala, Tlax.	Canal 6 (Milenio Televisión, CGTN En Español, Popcorn Central)	122.5 kW	Multimedios Televisión
27	7	XHTEM-TDT	Puebla; Actipan; Atlixco; Tlaxcala, Tlax.	Azteca 7 (a+)	53.32 kW; 17.52 kW; 2.74 kW; 21.91 kW	Televisión Azteca
12	11	XHCPAN-TDT	Puebla	Canal Once (Once niños)	83.231 kW	Instituto Politécnico Nacional
32	13	XHTMPT-TDT	Puebla; Tlaxcala, Tlax.	Telsusa (Canal 13)	109.825 kW	Telsusa Televisión México
30	14	XHSPRPA-TDT	Puebla	SPR multiplex (Canal Catorce, TV UNAM, Canal 22)	31.94 kW	Sistema Público de Radiodifusión del Estado Mexicano
8	18	XHBUAP-TDT	Puebla	TV BUAP	17.5 kW	Benemérita Universidad Autónoma de Puebla
11		XHCSAI-TDT	Puebla			Radio Lacustre, A.C.
28	1	XHTHN-TDT	Tehuacán	Azteca Uno (adn40)	17.36 kW	Televisión Azteca
34	7	XHTHP-TDT	Tehuacán	Azteca 7 (a+)	17.08 kW	Televisión Azteca
8	18	XHTEH-TDT	Tehuacán	TV BUAP	1.368 kW	Benemérita Universidad Autónoma de Puebla
10		XHCSAJ-TDT	Tehuacán			Radio Lacustre, A.C.
20	2/5	XHZAP-TDT	Zacatlán	Las Estrellas (Canal 5)	20 kW	Televimex
11	16	XHPBZC-TDT	Zacatlán; Puebla City (RF 26)	SICOM Televisión	0.180 kW; 72.8 kW	Gobierno del Estado de Puebla

== Querétaro ==
RF	VC	Call sign	Location	Network/name	ERP	Concessionaire
26	1	XHQUR-TDT	Querétaro (Cerro El Cimatario)	Azteca Uno (adn40)	301.070 kW	Televisión Azteca
32	2	XHZ-TDT	Querétaro (Cerro El Zamorano); Cerro El Cimatario (RF 9); Guanajuato, Gto. Irapuato-Celaya, Gto. San Miguel de Allende, Gto.	Las Estrellas (FOROtv)	180 kW; 20 kW; 20 kW; 50 kW; 65 kW	Televimex
15	3	XHCTCY-TDT	Querétaro (Cerro El Cimatario)	Imagen Televisión (Excélsior TV)	150 kW	Cadena Tres I, S.A. de C.V.
29	5	XEZ-TDT	Querétaro (Cerro El Zamorano); Cerro El Cimatario (RF 10); Guanajuato, Gto. Irapuato-Celaya, Gto. San Miguel de Allende, Gto.	Canal 5	180 kW; 20 kW; 20 kW; 50 kW; 65 kW	Radio Televisión
34	7	XHQUE-TDT	Querétaro (Cerro El Cimatario)	Azteca 7 (a+)	298.85 kW	Televisión Azteca
18	9	XHQCZ-TDT	Querétaro (Cerro El Zamorano); Cerro El Cimatario (RF 8); Irapuato-Celaya, Gto.	Nu9ve	190 kW; 20 kW; 10 kW	Teleimagen del Noroeste
14	10	XHSECE-TDT	Querétaro (Cerro El Cimatario)	RTQ	5 kW	Sistema Estatal de Comunicación Cultural y Educativa del Gobierno de Querétaro
30	14	XHSPRMQ-TDT	Querétaro (Cerro El Cimatario)	SPR multiplex (11.1 Canal Once, 14.1 Canal Catorce, 20.1 TV UNAM, 22.1 Canal 22)	11.2 kW	Sistema Público de Radiodifusión del Estado Mexicano
11	24	XHPBQR-TDT	Querétaro	TV UAQ	14.998 kW	Universidad Autónoma de Querétaro

== Quintana Roo ==
RF	VC	Call sign	Location	Network/name	ERP	Concessionaire
28	1	XHCCQ-TDT	Cancún; Playa del Carmen	Azteca Uno (adn40)	38.74 kW; 52.97 kW	Televisión Azteca
21	2	XHCCN-TDT	Cancún; Playa del Carmen	Las Estrellas	60 kW; 20 kW	Televimex
22	3	XHCTCN-TDT	Cancún	Imagen Televisión (Excélsior TV)	60 kW	Cadena Tres I, S.A. de C.V.
34	4	XHNQR-TDT	Cancún	SQCS	59.59 kW	Sistema Quintanarroense de Comunicación Social
27	5/9	XHQRO-TDT	Cancún; Playa del Carmen	Canal 5 (Nu9ve)	60 kW; 20 kW	Radio Televisión
25	7	XHAQR-TDT	Cancún; Playa del Carmen	Azteca 7 (a+)	38.97 kW; 53.08 kW	Televisión Azteca
36	8	XHCCU-TDT	Cancún; Playa del Carmen	SIPSE TVCUN (6.1 Multimedios Televisión)	86.24 kW; 20 kW	Televisora de Cancún (Grupo SIPSE)
17	11	XHPBCN-TDT	Cancún	Canal Once	109.53 kW	Instituto Politécnico Nacional
32	13	XHTMQR-TDT	Cancún	Telsusa (Canal 13)	80.610 kW	Telsusa Televisión México
29		XHSPQ-TDT	Cancún			Sistema Público de Radiodifusión del Estado Mexicano
23	1	XHBX-TDT	Chetumal	Azteca Uno (adn40)	8.54 kW	Televisión Azteca
27	2	XHCHF-TDT	Chetumal	Las Estrellas	28 kW	Televimex
22	3	XHCTCL-TDT	Chetumal	Imagen Televisión	10 kW	Cadena Tres I, S.A. de C.V.
34	4	XHLQR-TDT	Chetumal	SQCS	67.4 kW	Sistema Quintanarroense de Comunicación Social
29	5/9	XHCQR-TDT	Chetumal	Canal 5 (Nu9ve)	28 kW	Radio Televisión
26	7	XHCQO-TDT	Chetumal	Azteca 7 (a+)	8.52 kW	Televisión Azteca
20	13	XHTMCH-TDT	Chetumal	Telsusa (Canal 13)	80 kW	Telsusa Televisión México
25		XHSPJ-TDT	Chetumal			Sistema Público de Radiodifusión del Estado Mexicano
30	2	XHCOQ-TDT	Cozumel	Las Estrellas (5.1 Canal 5, 9.1 Nu9ve)	165 kW	Televimex
23	11	XHCOZ-TDT	Cozumel	5tv Cozumel	0.15 kW	Patronato Pro-Televisión de Cozumel
25	1/7	XHPVC-TDT	Felipe Carrillo Puerto	Azteca Uno (Azteca 7)	3.6 kW	Televisión Azteca
32	3	XHCTFC-TDT	Felipe Carrillo Puerto	Imagen Televisión		Cadena Tres I, S.A. de C.V.
28	4	XHFCQ-TDT	Felipe Carrillo Puerto	SQCS	0.1 kW	Sistema Quintanarroense de Comunicación Social (Gobierno del Estado de Quintana Roo)
33	3	XHCTMT-TDT	José María Morelos	Imagen Televisión		Cadena Tres I, S.A. de C.V.
19	13	XHTMTU-TDT	Tulum/Playa del Carmen	Telsusa (Canal 13)	80 kW	Telsusa Televisión México

== San Luis Potosí ==
RF	VC	Call sign	Location	Network/name	ERP	Concessionaire
30	2	XHCDV-TDT	Ciudad Valles	Las Estrellas (N+ FORO)	18 kW	Televimex
32	5	XHVST-TDT	Ciudad Valles	Canal 5	18 kW	Radio Televisión
27	7/1	XHKD-TDT	Ciudad Valles; Cd. Mante, Tamps.	Azteca 7 (Azteca Uno)	10.13 kW	Televisión Azteca
36	8	XHVSL-TDT	Ciudad Valles; Tamazunchale; Cd. Mante, Tamps.	Televalles	85.673 kW; 2 kW; 1 kW	TV Ocho
12		XHCPCX-TDT	Ciudad Valles		42.002 kW	Sistema Público de Radiodifusión del Estado Mexicano
26	1	XHPMS-TDT	Matehuala	Azteca Uno (adn40)	4.44 kW	Televisión Azteca
29	2/5	XHMTS-TDT	Matehuala	Las Estrellas (Canal 5)	27 kW	Televimex
22	7	XHCDI-TDT	Matehuala	Azteca 7	4.48 kW	Televisión Azteca
33	10	XHCOSL-TDT	Matehuala	Canal 7	60 kW	Comunicación 2000
26	3	XHCTRV-TDT	Rioverde	Imagen Televisión (Excélsior TV)	4 kW	Cadena Tres I, S.A. de C.V.
28	1	XHDD-TDT	San Luis Potosí	Azteca Uno (adn40)	43.42 kW	Televisión Azteca
31	2	XHSLA-TDT	San Luis Potosí	Las Estrellas (N+ FORO)	210 kW	Televimex
33	3	XHCTSL-TDT	San Luis Potosí	Imagen Televisión (Excélsior TV)	29.743 kW	Cadena Tres I, S.A. de C.V.
34	5	XHSLT-TDT	San Luis Potosí	Canal 5 (8.1 Nu9ve)	210 kW	Radio Televisión
22	7	XHCLP-TDT	San Luis Potosí	Azteca 7 (a+)	44.39 kW	Televisión Azteca
35	9	XHSLS-TDT	San Luis Potosí	Nueve TV	27.72 kW	Gobierno de San Luis Potosí
29	10	XHSLV-TDT	San Luis Potosí	Canal 7	294.06 kW	Comunicación 2000
24	11	XHCPDJ-TDT	San Luis Potosí	Canal Once (Once Niñas y Niños)	22.52 kW	Instituto Politécnico Nacional
16	13	XHDE-TDT	San Luis Potosí	CN13	50.6 kW	Televisora Potosina
23	14	XHSPS-TDT	San Luis Potosí	Canal Catorce	20.75 kW	Sistema Público de Radiodifusión del Estado Mexicano
10	4	XHROSL-TDT	San Luis Potosí	Globalmedia TV		Radio Operadora Pegasso
21	1	XHTAZ-TDT	Tamazunchale	Azteca Uno (adn40)	5.06 kW	Televisión Azteca
29	2/5	XHTAT-TDT	Tamazunchale	Las Estrellas (Canal 5)	40 kW	Televimex
24	7	XHTZL-TDT	Tamazunchale	Azteca 7	5.05 kW	Televisión Azteca

== Sinaloa ==
RF	VC	Call sign	Location	Network/name	ERP	Concessionaire
32	1	XHCUA-TDT	Culiacán	Azteca Uno (adn40)	36.7 kW	Televisión Azteca
23	2	XHBT-TDT	Culiacán	Las Estrellas (FOROtv)	155 kW	Televimex
33	3	XHCTCI-TDT	Culiacán	Imagen Televisión (Excélsior TV)	100 kW	Cadena Tres I, S.A. de C.V.
24	5	XHCUI-TDT	Culiacán	Canal 5 (9.1 Nu9ve)	155 kW	Radio Televisión
35	7	XHDO-TDT	Culiacán	Azteca 7 (a+)	52.85 kW	Televisión Azteca
30	10	XHQ-TDT	Culiacán	TVP	120 kW	T.V. de Culiacán
21	11	XHCPDI-TDT	Culiacán	Canal Once (Once Niñas y Niños)	44.45 kW	Instituto Politécnico Nacional
9	12	XHCPAR-TDT	Culiacán	Antena Lince	19.998 kW	Universidad Autónoma de Occidente
27	1	XHMSI-TDT	Los Mochis	Azteca Uno (adn40)	45.49 kW	Televisión Azteca
25	2	XHBS-TDT	Los Mochis; Cd. Obregón, Son. (RF 30)	Las Estrellas (FOROtv)	110 kW; 200 kW	Televimex
33	3	XHCTLM-TDT	Los Mochis	Imagen Televisión (Excélsior TV)	50.496 kW	Cadena Tres I, S.A. de C.V.
29	5/9	XHLMI-TDT	Los Mochis	Canal 5 (Nu9ve)	110 kW	Radio Televisión
31	7	XHMIS-TDT	Los Mochis	Azteca 7 (a+)	77.37 kW	Televisión Azteca
32	10	XHI-TDT (Note: While XHI Los Mochis is licensed as a repeater of its Ciudad Obregón station, XHI Los Mochis features significant local content and often has a different schedule compared to Ciudad Obregón.)	Los Mochis	TVP	19.996 kW	Televisora del Yaqui
21	11	XHSIM-TDT	Los Mochis	Canal Once (Once Niñas y Niños)	218.51 kW	Instituto Politécnico Nacional
34	1	XHLSI-TDT	Mazatlán	Azteca Uno (adn40)	38.31 kW	Televisión Azteca
25	2	XHOW-TDT	Mazatlán	Las Estrellas (FOROtv)	118 kW	Televimex
21	3	XHCTMZ-TDT	Mazatlán	Imagen Televisión (Excélsior TV)	34.656 kW	Cadena Tres I, S.A. de C.V.
28	5/9	XHMAF-TDT	Mazatlán	Canal 5 (Nu9ve)	118 kW	Radio Televisión
31	7	XHDL-TDT	Mazatlán	Azteca 7 (a+)	38.52 kW	Televisión Azteca
23	10	XHMZ-TDT	Mazatlán	TVP	100 kW	Televisión del Pacífico
29	14	XHSPRMS-TDT	Mazatlán	SPR multiplex (11.1 Canal Once, 14.1 Canal Catorce, 14.2 Ingenio Tv, 20.1 TV UNAM, 22.1 Canal 22, 45.1 Canal del Congreso)	28.65 kW	Sistema Público de Radiodifusión del Estado Mexicano

== Sonora ==
RF	VC	Call sign	Location	Network/name	ERP	Concessionaire
14	15	XHADO-TDT	Adivino	Telemax	.036 kW	Gobierno del Estado de Sonora
22	15	XHAPS-TDT	Agua Prieta	Telemax	2.5 kW	Gobierno del Estado de Sonora
17	2	XHAPT-TDT	Agua Prieta	Las Estrellas	25 kW	Televimex
22	15	XHALM-TDT	Álamos	Telemax	.15 kW	Gobierno del Estado de Sonora
22	15	XHACH-TDT	Arivechi	Telemax	.267 kW	Gobierno del Estado de Sonora
14	15	XHAZP-TDT	Arizpe	Telemax	.13 kW	Gobierno del Estado de Sonora
14	15	XHALS-TDT	Atil	Telemax	.05 kW	Gobierno del Estado de Sonora
14	15	XHBNI-TDT	Bacadehuachi	Telemax	.036 kW	Gobierno del Estado de Sonora
14	15	XHBCA-TDT	Bacanora	Telemax	.023 kW	Gobierno del Estado de Sonora
16	15	XHBAC-TDT	Bacerac	Telemax	.036 kW	Gobierno del Estado de Sonora
14	15	XHBCI-TDT	Bacoachi	Telemax	.036 kW	Gobierno del Estado de Sonora
30	15	XHBAS-TDT	Banamichi	Telemax	.036 kW	Gobierno del Estado de Sonora
14	15	XHBVA-TDT	Baviacora	Telemax	0.7 kW	Gobierno del Estado de Sonora
14	15	XHBVE-TDT	Bavispe	Telemax	.3 kW	Gobierno del Estado de Sonora
14	15	XHBNL-TDT	Benjamin Hill	Telemax	.1 kW	Gobierno del Estado de Sonora
35	2	XHSVT-TDT	Caborca	Las Estrellas	37 kW	Televimex
17	5	XHCBO-TDT	Caborca	Canal 5	37 kW	Radio Televisión
36	15	XHCAS-TDT	Caborca	Telemax	2.5 kW	Gobierno del Estado de Sonora
34	2	XHCNS-TDT	Cananea	Las Estrellas	32 kW	Televimex
25	7	XHCAN-TDT	Cananea	Azteca 7	5.11 kW	Televisión Azteca
5	15	XHCPCA-TDT	Cananea	Telemax		Gobierno del Estado de Sonora
15	15	XHCRO-TDT	Carbó	Telemax	.5 kW	Gobierno del Estado de Sonora
33	1	XHCSO-TDT	Ciudad Obregón	Azteca Uno (adn40)	38.46 kW	Televisión Azteca
24	3	XHCTOB-TDT	Ciudad Obregón	Imagen Televisión (Excélsior TV)	120 kW	Cadena Tres I, S. A. de C.V.
36	5	XHCDO-TDT	Ciudad Obregón	Canal 5 (9.1 Nu9ve, 12.1 Televisa Sonora)	200 kW	Radio Televisión
35	7	XHBK-TDT	Ciudad Obregón	Azteca 7 (a+)	45.75 kW	Televisión Azteca
32; 34	10	XHI-TDT	Ciudad Obregón; Empalme/Guaymas	Televisa local	125 kW; 5 kW	Televisora del Yaqui
31	14	XHSPROS-TDT	Ciudad Obregón	SPR multiplex (11.1 Canal Once, 14.1 Canal Catorce, 14.2 Ingenio Tv, 20.1 TV UNAM, 22.1 Canal 22, 45.1 Canal del Congreso)	57.34 kW	Sistema Público de Radiodifusión del Estado Mexicano
25	15	XHCPBY-TDT	Ciudad Obregón	Telemax		Gobierno del Estado de Sonora
14	15	XHRPS-TDT	Cucurpe	Telemax	.036 kW	Gobierno del Estado de Sonora
34	15	XHCPS-TDT	Cumpas	Telemax	.05 kW	Gobierno del Estado de Sonora
16	15	XHDVS-TDT	Divisaderos	Telemax		Gobierno del Estado de Sonora
19	15	XHFAS-TDT	Fronteras	Telemax	.036 kW	Gobierno del Estado de Sonora
28	15	XHGDS-TDT	Granados	Telemax	.036 kW	Gobierno del Estado de Sonora
21	1/7	XHHN-TDT	Guaymas	Azteca Uno (Azteca 7)	12.34 kW	Televisión Azteca
20	2	XHGST-TDT	Guaymas	Las Estrellas	46 kW	Televimex
29	5	XHGUY-TDT	Guaymas	Canal 5	46 kW	Radio Televisión
18	15	XHSGU-TDT	Guaymas	Telemax	5 kW	Gobierno del Estado de Sonora
24	1	XHHSS-TDT	Hermosillo	Azteca Uno (adn40)	38.950 kW	Televisión Azteca
23	2	XHHES-TDT	Hermosillo	Las Estrellas (FOROtv)	100 kW	Televimex
28	3	XHCTHE-TDT	Hermosillo	Imagen Televisión (Excélsior TV)	100 kW	Cadena Tres I, S.A. de C.V.
29	5	XHHMS-TDT	Hermosillo	Canal 5	100 kW	Radio Televisión
30	7	XHHO-TDT	Hermosillo	Azteca 7 (a+)	39.43 kW	Televisión Azteca
8	8	XHUS-TDT	Hermosillo	Televisión Universitaria	38.43 kW	Universidad de Sonora
31	9	XHHMA-TDT	Hermosillo	Nu9ve	100 kW	Teleimagen del Noroeste
33	12	XHAK-TDT	Hermosillo	Televisa Regional	100 kW	Televisora de Occidente
27	14	XHSPRHA-TDT	Hermosillo	SPR multiplex (11.1 Canal Once, 14.1 Canal Catorce, 20.1 TV UNAM, 22.1 Canal 22)	43.8 kW	Sistema Público de Radiodifusión del Estado Mexicano
19	15	XEWH-TDT	Hermosillo	Telemax	40 kW	Televisora de Hermosillo (Gobierno del Estado de Sonora)
14	15	XHHCH-TDT	Huachinera	Telemax	.036 kW	Gobierno del Estado de Sonora
18	15	XHHAS-TDT	Huásabas	Telemax	.5 kW	Gobierno del Estado de Sonora
19	15	XHIMS-TDT	Imuris	Telemax	.05 kW	Gobierno del Estado de Sonora
14	15	XHMDS-TDT	Magdalena de Kino	Telemax	.05 kW	Gobierno del Estado de Sonora
21	2	XHMST-TDT	Magdalena de Kino	Las Estrellas	24 kW	Televimex
34	15	XHMZN-TDT	Mazatán	Telemax	.036 kW	Gobierno del Estado de Sonora
31	15	XHMOS-TDT	Moctezuma	Telemax	0.7 kW	Gobierno del Estado de Sonora
33	15	XHNAC-TDT	Naco	Telemax	.036 kW	Gobierno del Estado de Sonora
14	15	XHNCO-TDT	Nácori Chico	Telemax	.036 kW	Gobierno del Estado de Sonora
14	15	XHNGE-TDT	Nácori Grande	Telemax	.036 kW	Gobierno del Estado de Sonora
22	15	XHNCZ-TDT	Nacozari	Telemax	1 kW	Gobierno del Estado de Sonora
27	2	XHBF-TDT	Navojoa	Las Estrellas	65 kW	Televisora de Navojoa
15	1	XHFA-TDT	Nogales; Cananea	Azteca Uno (adn40)	77.34 kW; 13.94 kW	Televisión Azteca
17	2	XHNOS-TDT	Nogales	Las Estrellas	35 kW	Televimex
26	5	XHNON-TDT	Nogales	Canal 5	35 kW	Radio Televisión
24	7	XHNOA-TDT	Nogales	Azteca 7	76.82 kW	Televisión Azteca
31	8	XHNSS-TDT	Nogales	Local independent	42.46 kW	Jaime Juaristi Santos
14	15	XHONV-TDT	Ónavas	Telemax	.023 kW	Gobierno del Estado de Sonora
15	15	XHOQT-TDT	Oquitoa	Telemax	.036 kW	Gobierno del Estado de Sonora
22	2/5	XHPDT-TDT	Puerto Peñasco	Las Estrellas (Canal 5)	32 kW	Televimex
21	7/1	XHPPS-TDT	Puerto Peñasco	Azteca 7 (Azteca Uno)	1.82 kW	Televisión Azteca
20	15	XHCPCZ-TDT	Puerto Peñasco	Telemax		Gobierno del Estado de Sonora
16	15	XHQBI-TDT	Querobabi	Telemax	.05 kW	Gobierno del Estado de Sonora
15	15	XHRON-TDT	Rayon	Telemax	.05 kW	Gobierno del Estado de Sonora
35	15	XHRSO-TDT	Rosario	Telemax	.2 kW	Gobierno del Estado de Sonora
20	15	XHSPA-TDT	Sahuaripa	Telemax	1 kW	Gobierno del Estado de Sonora
18	15	XHSFS-TDT	San Felipe de Jesús	Telemax	.05 kW	Gobierno del Estado de Sonora
14	15	XHSJR-TDT	San Javier	Telemax	.023 kW	Gobierno del Estado de Sonora
32	2/5	XHLRT-TDT	San Luis Río Colorado	Las Estrellas (Canal 5)	55 kW	Televimex
30	15	XHRCS-TDT	San Luis Río Colorado	Telemax	10.2 kW	Gobierno del Estado de Sonora
14	15	XHSPE-TDT	San Pedro de la Cueva	Telemax	.05 kW	Gobierno del Estado de Sonora
15	15	XHSAS-TDT	Santa Ana	Telemax		Gobierno del Estado de Sonora
14	15	XHSCZ-TDT	Santa Cruz	Telemax	.036 kW	Gobierno del Estado de Sonora
14	15	XHSIC-TDT	Saric	Telemax	.023 kW	Gobierno del Estado de Sonora
14	15	XHSSE-TDT	Sásabe	Telemax	.023 kW	Gobierno del Estado de Sonora
17	15	XHSQP-TDT	Sinoquipe	Telemax	.05 kW	Gobierno del Estado de Sonora
14	15	XHSYT-TDT	Sonoyta	Telemax		Gobierno del Estado de Sonora
35	15	XHSYO-TDT	Soyopa	Telemax	.05 kW	Gobierno del Estado de Sonora
34	15	XHSGE-TDT	Suaqui Grande	Telemax	.023 kW	Gobierno del Estado de Sonora
14	15	XHTCE-TDT	Tepache	Telemax	.05 kW	Gobierno del Estado de Sonora
14	15	XHUES-TDT	Ures	Telemax	1.9 kW	Gobierno del Estado de Sonora
14	15	XHVHO-TDT	Villa Hidalgo	Telemax	.036 kW	Gobierno del Estado de Sonora
31	15	XHVPA-TDT	Villa Pesqueira	Telemax	.036 kW	Gobierno del Estado de Sonora
17	15	XHCPCC-TDT	Yécora	Telemax		Gobierno del Estado de Sonora

== Tabasco ==
RF	VC	Call sign	Location	Network/name	ERP	Concessionaire
27	2/5	XHFRT-TDT	Frontera	Las Estrellas (Canal 5)	18 kW	Televimex
33	7/1	XHLAV-TDT	La Venta	Azteca 7 (Azteca Uno)	.97 kW	Televisión Azteca
31	2/5	XHUBT-TDT	La Venta	Las Estrellas (Canal 5)	3 kW	Televimex
34	46	XHVET-TDT	La Venta	TVT	82.2 kW	Televisión Tabasqueña
30	2/5	XHTET-TDT	Tenosique; Palenque, Chis.	Las Estrellas (Canal 5)	28 kW	Televimex
26	13	XHTOE-TDT	Tenosique	Telsusa (Canal 13)	55 kW	Tele-Emisoras del Sureste
34	46	XHMET-TDT	Tenosique	TVT	75.8 kW	Televisión Tabasqueña
29	1	XHVHT-TDT	Villahermosa	Azteca Uno (adn40)	18.79 kW	Televisión Azteca
32	2	XHVIZ-TDT	Villahermosa	Las Estrellas (5.1 Canal 5, 9.1 Nu9ve)	125 kW	Televimex
36	3	XHCTVL-TDT	Villahermosa	Imagen Televisión (Excélsior TV)	100 kW	Cadena Tres I, S.A. de C.V.
33	6	XHLL-TDT	Villahermosa	Canal 6	12 kW	Television de Tabasco
23	7	XHVIH-TDT	Villahermosa	Azteca 7 (a+)	18.88 kW	Televisión Azteca
30	13	XHTVL-TDT	Villahermosa	Telsusa (Canal 13)	160 kW	Tele-Emisoras del Sureste
25	14	XHSPRVT-TDT	Villahermosa	SPR multiplex (11.1 Canal Once, 14.1 Canal Catorce, 14.2 Ingenio Tv, 20.1 TV UNAM, 22.1 Canal 22, 45.1 Canal del Congreso)	13.92 kW	Sistema Público de Radiodifusión del Estado Mexicano
35	35	XHUJAT-TDT	Villahermosa	TV UJAT	39.34 kW	Universidad Juárez Autónoma de Tabasco
34	46	XHSTA-TDT	Villahermosa	TVT	74.3 kW	Televisión Tabasqueña

== Tamaulipas ==
RF	VC	Call sign	Location	Network/name	ERP	Concessionaire
23	1	XHBY-TDT	Ciudad Mante	Azteca Uno (adn Noticias)	8.45 kW	Televisión Azteca
34	2	XHMBT-TDT	Ciudad Mante	Las Estrellas	27 kW	Televimex
22	5	XHCMU-TDT	Ciudad Mante	Canal 5	27 kW	Radio Televisión
24	1	XHCVT-TDT	Ciudad Victoria	Azteca Uno (adn Noticias)	17.08 kW	Televisión Azteca
31	2	XHTK-TDT	Ciudad Victoria	Las Estrellas	80 kW	Televimex
20	3	XHCTVI-TDT	Ciudad Victoria	Imagen Televisión (Excélsior TV)	20.248 kW	Cadena Tres I, S.A. de C.V.
36	5	XHUT-TDT	Ciudad Victoria	Canal 5	80 kW	Radio Televisión
25	6	XHVTU-TDT	Ciudad Victoria	Canal 6 (Milenio Televisión, CGTN En Español, Popcorn Central)	20 kW	Multimedios Televisión
29	7	XHCDT-TDT	Ciudad Victoria	Azteca 7 (a+)	80.640 kW	Televisión Azteca
26	9	XHCVI-TDT	Ciudad Victoria	Nu9ve	80 kW	Teleimagen del Noroeste
12	14	XHCPBD-TDT	Ciudad Victoria	Canal Catorce (TV Migrante)	30 kW	Sistema Público de Radiodifusión del Estado Mexicano
30	2	XHLUT-TDT	La Rosita-Villagrán	Las Estrellas	35 kW	Televimex
12	1	XHMTA-TDT	Matamoros	Azteca Uno (adn Noticias)	75.123 kW	Televisión Azteca
15	6	XHVTV-TDT	El Control; Matamoros; Reynosa	Canal 6 (Milenio Televisión, CGTN En Español, Popcorn Central)	15 kW; 35 kW; 40 kW	Televisión Digital
33	7	XHOR-TDT	Matamoros; Reynosa	Azteca 7 (a+)	118.037 kW; 61.447 kW	Televisión Azteca
23	1	XHLNA-TDT	Nuevo Laredo	Azteca Uno (adn Noticias)	19.19 kW (Note: This is a temporary facility on the Multimedios tower due to the collapse of the TV Azteca tower in Nuevo Laredo in May 2021.)	Televisión Azteca
29	2	XHLAR-TDT	Nuevo Laredo	Las Estrellas	200 kW	Televimex
35	3	XHCTNL-TDT	Nuevo Laredo	Imagen Televisión (Excélsior TV)	143 kW	Cadena Tres I, S.A. de C.V.
25	4/5	XHBR-TDT	Nuevo Laredo	Televisa Regional (Canal 5)	200 kW	Televisora de Occidente
32	6	XHNAT-TDT	Nuevo Laredo	Canal 6 (Milenio Televisión, CGTN En Español, Popcorn Central)	54.34 kW	Multimedios Televisión
33	7	XHLAT-TDT	Nuevo Laredo	Azteca 7 (a+)	27.63 kW (Note: This is a temporary facility on the Multimedios tower due to the collapse of the TV Azteca tower in Nuevo Laredo in May 2021.)	Televisión Azteca
17	17	XEFE-TDT	Nuevo Laredo	Canal Once	100 kW	Ramona Esparza González
36	1	XHREY-TDT	Reynosa	Azteca Uno (adn Noticias)	61.240 kW	Televisión Azteca
28	2	XHTAM-TDT	Reynosa-Matamoros	Las Estrellas (Canal 5)	391.761 kW	Televimex
30	8	XHAB-TDT	Reynosa-Matamoros	Televisa Regional	348.027 kW	Televisora de Occidente
19	9	XERV-TDT	Reynosa-Matamoros	Las Estrellas	292.265 kW	Televisora de Occidente
9	11	XHCPCF-TDT	Reynosa	Canal Once (Once Niñas y Niños)	1.244 kW	Instituto Politécnico Nacional
22	13	XHCTRM-TDT	Reynosa; Matamoros	Imagen Televisión (Excélsior TV)	145.562 kW; 30 kW	Cadena Tres I, S.A. de C.V.
7	14	XHCPCE-TDT	Reynosa	Canal Catorce (TV Migrante)	35 kW	Sistema Público de Radiodifusión del Estado Mexicano
29	18	XHRBA-TDT	Río Bravo	Canal 18	11.160 kW	Patronato Pro-Difusión Social
21	1/7	XHFET-TDT	San Fernando	Azteca Uno (Azteca 7)	0.9 kW	Televisión Azteca
25	2	XHSFT-TDT	San Fernando	Las Estrellas	15 kW	Televimex
28	1/7	XHHP-TDT	Soto La Marina	Azteca Uno (Azteca 7)	5.09 kW	Televisión Azteca
32	2	XHSZT-TDT	Soto La Marina	Las Estrellas	20 kW	Televimex
29	1	XHWT-TDT	Tampico	Azteca Uno (adn Noticias)	30.2 kW	Televisión Azteca
17	2	XHGO-TDT	Tampico	Las Estrellas (N+ Foro)	180 kW	Televimex
25	3	XHCTTA-TDT	Tampico	Imagen Televisión (Excélsior TV)	100 kW	Cadena Tres I, S.A. de C.V.
16	4	XHTPZ-TDT	Tampico	Televisa Regional (9.1 Nu9ve)	180 kW	Televisora de Occidente
15	5	XHD-TDT	Tampico	Canal 5	180 kW	Radio Televisión
14	6	XHTAO-TDT	Tampico	Canal 6 (Milenio Televisión, City Channel, Popcorn Central)	12.5 kW	Multimedios Televisión
21	7	XHTAU-TDT	Tampico	Azteca 7 (a+)	30.54 kW	Televisión Azteca
35	14	XHSPRTA-TDT	Tampico	SPR multiplex (11.1 Canal Once, 14.1 Canal Catorce, 20.1 TV UNAM, 22.1 Canal 22)	20.42 kW	Sistema Público de Radiodifusión del Estado Mexicano

== Tlaxcala ==
RF	VC	Call sign	Location	Network/name	ERP	Concessionaire
22	10	XHTXB-TDT	Apizaco	Tlaxcala Televisión	7.26 kW	Gobierno del Estado de Tlaxcala
31	10	XHTCL-TDT	Calpulalpan	Tlaxcala Televisión	1.5 kW	Gobierno del Estado de Tlaxcala
23	10	XHTXM-TDT	Huamantla	Tlaxcala Televisión	3.77 kW	Gobierno del Estado de Tlaxcala
22	10	XHSPM-TDT	San Pablo del Monte	Tlaxcala Televisión	3.94 kW	Gobierno del Estado de Tlaxcala
23	10	XHTLX-TDT	Tlaxcala	Tlaxcala Televisión	7.26 kW	Gobierno del Estado de Tlaxcala

== Veracruz ==
RF	VC	Call sign	Location	Network/name	ERP	Concessionaire
32	1/7	XHAZL-TDT	Cerro Azul	Azteca Uno (Azteca 7)	4.5 kW	Televisión Azteca
18	2/5	XHCRT-TDT	Cerro Azul	Las Estrellas (Canal 5)	28 kW	Televimex
25	3	XHCTCZ-TDT	Cerro Azul	Imagen Televisión (Excélsior TV)	10 kW	Cadena Tres I, S.A. de C.V.
36	1	XHBE-TDT	Coatzacoalcos	Azteca Uno (adn40)	50.58 kW	Televisión Azteca
24	2	XHCV-TDT	Coatzacoalcos	Las Estrellas (N+ Foro)	60 kW	Televimex
16	3	XHCTLV-TDT	La Venta, Tab./Coatzacoalcos	Imagen Televisión (Excélsior TV)	80 kW	Cadena Tres I, S.A. de C.V.
27	5/9	XHCOV-TDT	Coatzacoalcos	Canal 5 (Nu9ve)	60 kW	Radio Televisión
18	7	XHCTZ-TDT	Coatzacoalcos	Azteca 7 (a+)	50.4 kW	Televisión Azteca
20	13	XHCVP-TDT	Coatzacoalcos	Telsusa (Canal 13)	1 kW	Patronato para Instalar Repetidoras de Canales de Televisión en Coatzacoalcos, Veracruz
26	14	XHSPRCA-TDT	Coatzacoalcos	SPR multiplex (11.1 Canal Once, 14.1 Canal Catorce, 20.1 TV UNAM, 22.1 Canal 22)	20.51 kW	Sistema Público de Radiodifusión del Estado Mexicano
31	1	XHIC-TDT	Cofre de Perote; Orizaba	Azteca Uno (adn40)	239.46 kW; 30.72 kW	Televisión Azteca
17	2	XHAH-TDT	Las Lajas; Nogales; Orizaba	Las Estrellas (N+ Foro)	430 kW; 25 kW; 60 kW	Televimex
20	3	XHCTJA-TDT	Las Lajas; Xalapa	Imagen Televisión (Excélsior TV)	20 kW	Cadena Tres I, S.A. de C.V.
28	5	XHAJ-TDT	Las Lajas; Nogales; Orizaba; San Andrés Tuxtla (RF 39)	Canal 5	430 kW; 25 kW; 60 kW; 20 kW	Radio Televisión
33	7	XHCPE-TDT	Cofre de Perote; Orizaba	Azteca 7 (a+)	239.16 kW; 30.67 kW; 25.09 kW	Televisión Azteca
27	8	XHAI-TDT	Las Lajas; Nogales; Orizaba	Telever	430 kW; 25 kW; 60 kW	Televisora de Occidente
34	9	XHCLV-TDT	Las Lajas; Nogales	Nu9ve	430 kW; 25 kW	Teleimagen del Noroeste
19	13	XHTMVE-TDT	Xalapa; La Perla (Orizaba)	Telsusa (Canal 13)	68.6 kW; 6 kW	Telsusa Televisión México
35	14	XHSPRXA-TDT	Xalapa/Las Lajas	SPR multiplex (11.1 Canal Once, 14.1 Canal Catorce, 20.1 TV UNAM, 22.1 Canal 22)	64.35 kW	Sistema Público de Radiodifusión del Estado Mexicano
26; 33; 22; 29; 26	26	XHCPEO-TDT	Las Lajas; Cerro Azul; Coatzacoalcos; Mecayapan; Orizaba, Córdoba, Fortín	TVMás	247.18 kW; 50 kW; 50 kW; 25 kW; 10 kW	Gobierno del Estado de Veracruz
33	1	XHSTV-TDT	Santiago Tuxtla	Azteca Uno (adn40)	15.16 kW	Televisión Azteca
35	2	XHATV-TDT	San Andrés Tuxtla	Las Estrellas	22 kW	Televimex
32	7	XHSTE-TDT	Santiago Tuxtla	Azteca 7 (a+)	15.18 kW	Televisión Azteca
25	3	XHCTVE-TDT	Veracruz	Imagen Televisión (Excélsior TV)	25 kW	Cadena Tres I, S.A. de C.V.
24	12	XHFM-TDT	Veracruz	Telever (2.1 Las Estrellas, 5.1 Canal 5)	45 kW	Televisora de Occidente
29	13	XHTMBR-TDT	Veracruz	Telsusa (Canal 13)	10 kW	Telsusa Televisión México

== Yucatán ==
RF	VC	Call sign	Location	Network/name	ERP	Concessionaire
31	1	XHDH-TDT	Mérida	Azteca Uno (adn40)	97.952 kW	Televisión Azteca
30	2	XHTP-TDT	Mérida	Las Estrellas (FOROtv)	125 kW	Televisora Peninsular
22	3	XHCTMD-TDT	Mérida	Imagen Televisión (Excélsior TV)	60 kW	Cadena Tres I, S.A. de C.V.
28	4	XHST-TDT	Mérida	Tele Yucatán	100 kW	Sistema Tele Yucatán (Gobierno del Estado de Yucatán)
35	5	XHMEN-TDT	Mérida	Canal 5 (9.1 Nu9ve)	125 kW	Radio Televisión
33	7	XHMEY-TDT	Mérida	Azteca 7 (a+)	97.708 kW	Televisión Azteca
25	8	XHY-TDT	Mérida	SIPSE Televisión (6.1 Multimedios Televisión)	122.6 kW	Televisora de Yucatán (Grupo SIPSE)
24	13	XHTMYC-TDT	Mérida	Telsusa (Canal 13)	160.6 kW	Telsusa Televisión México
23	14	XHSPRME-TDT	Mérida	SPR multiplex (11.1 Canal Once, 14.1 Canal Catorce, 20.1 TV UNAM, 22.1 Canal 22)	33.6 kW	Sistema Público de Radiodifusión del Estado Mexicano
23	1	XHKYU-TDT	Valladolid/Kahua	Azteca Uno (adn40)	4.76 kW	Televisión Azteca
32	2/5	XHVTT-TDT	Valladolid; Tizimín	Las Estrellas (Canal 5)	60 kW; 28 kW	Televimex
24	7	XHVAD-TDT	Valladolid/Kahua	Azteca 7	4.75 kW	Televisión Azteca
27	13	XHTMYU-TDT	Valladolid–Tizimín	Telsusa (Canal 13)	80.120 kW	Telsusa Televisión México

== Zacatecas ==
RF	VC	Call sign	Location	Network/name	ERP	Concessionaire
34	1/7	XHKC-TDT	Fresnillo	Azteca Uno (Azteca 7)	9.230 kW	Televisión Azteca
22	2	XHJZT-TDT	Jalpa	Las Estrellas	25 kW	Televimex
23	2	XHNOZ-TDT	Nochistlan	Las Estrellas	32 kW	Televimex
27	1/7	XHCPZ-TDT	Sombrerete	Azteca Uno (Azteca 7)	9.13 kW	Televisión Azteca
18	2	XHSOZ-TDT	Sombrerete	Las Estrellas	32 kW	Televimex
23	5	XHSMZ-TDT	Sombrerete	Canal 5	32 kW	Radio Televisión
24	2	XHTLZ-TDT	Tlaltenango; Calvillo, Ags.	Las Estrellas	22 kW; 17 kW	Televimex
22	2	XHVAZ-TDT	Valparaiso	Las Estrellas	22 kW	Televimex
31	1	XHLVZ-TDT	Zacatecas	Azteca Uno (adn40)	40.94 kW	Televisión Azteca
16	2	XHBD-TDT	Zacatecas; Aguascalientes, Ags.	Las Estrellas (FOROtv)	130 kW; 225 kW	Televimex
27	3	XHCTZA-TDT	Zacatecas	Imagen Televisión (Excélsior TV)	92.942 kW	Cadena Tres I, S.A. de C.V.
17	5	XHBQ-TDT	Zacatecas	Canal 5	130 kW	Radio Televisión
36	7	XHIV-TDT	Zacatecas	Azteca 7 (a+)	40.76 kW	Televisión Azteca
19	9	XHZAT-TDT	Zacatecas	Nu9ve	130 kW	Teleimagen del Noroeste
15	14	XHSPRZC-TDT	Zacatecas	SPR multiplex (11.1 Canal Once, 14.1 Canal Catorce, 14.2 Ingenio Tv, 20.1 TV UNAM, 22.1 Canal 22, 45.1 Canal del Congreso)	48.99 kW	Sistema Público de Radiodifusión del Estado Mexicano
20	15	XHZAC-TDT	Zacatecas	Canal 15 Zacatecas	8.93 kW	Integración Mexicana con Visión en Zacatecas (operated by Grupo Radiofónico B-15)
24	24	XHZHZ-TDT	Zacatecas	SIZART (Once Niños)	41.9 kW	Gobierno del Estado de Zacatecas
30	30	XHZAE-TDT	Zacatecas	TeleZer	10.028 kW	Valores y Tradiciones de Mi Tierra (operated by Grupo Radiofónico ZER)
22	44	XHFZC-TDT	Zacatecas	NTR TV	10.001 kW	Fundación Cultural por Zacatecas (operated by NTR Medios de Comunicación)

== See also ==
- List of Mexican television networks
- Television in Mexico
