= List of television networks in Mexico =

== National network list ==
All of the networks listed below operate a number of terrestrial TV stations. In addition, several of these networks are also aired on cable and satellite services.

=== Commercial ===
Six television networks in Mexico have more than 75% national coverage and are thus required to be carried by all pay TV providers and offered at no cost by the broadcaster. Additionally, these networks are also required to provide accessibility for the hearing impaired with the use of Closed Captioning and/or Mexican sign language.

- Azteca Uno (TV Azteca)
- ADN Noticias (TV Azteca)
- Las Estrellas (Televisa)
- Imagen Televisión (Grupo Imagen)
- Canal 5 (Televisa)
- Azteca 7 (TV Azteca)
- A Más+ (TV Azteca)

ADN Noticias and A Más+ have coverage primarily provided by subchannels.

=== Noncommercial ===
Of the many noncommercial services, there are only two national networks of retransmitters:

- Canal Once (Instituto Politécnico Nacional)
- TV Migrante (SPR)

The digital SPR retransmitters offer Canal Once along with these important noncommercial television services:

- Canal 22 (Secretaría de Cultura)
- Canal 14 (SPR)
- @prende+ (Televisión Educativa)
- TV UNAM (Universidad Nacional Autónoma de México)
- Canal del Congreso (Congreso de la Unión)

In addition to the latter, Canal Judicial is also required to be carried by all pay TV providers and offered at no cost by the broadcaster, although there is no terrestrial station that broadcasts this network.

== Regional or limited coverage commercial networks ==
There are some networks operating in Mexico which have limited coverage or primarily serve a region in particular.
Currently, there are three networks of this kind which have a significant coverage:

- Canal 6 (Multimedios)
- NU9VE (Televisa)
- Canal 13 (Mexico) (Albavisión México)

Other regional/limited networks include:

- El Canal de las Noticias (Intermedia) (Mexicali and the State of Chihuahua)
- ABC Televisión (State of Chihuahua)
- TV Mar (Los Cabos and La Paz in Baja California Sur and Puerto Vallarta, Jalisco)
- N+ Foro (Televisa)
- Milenio Televisión (Multimedios)
- Teleritmo (Multimedios)
- CV Shopping
- MVS TV (MVS Comunicaciones)

== State-Level Broadcast Television Networks ==
Mexico also has Government-Run State Television Networks in 27 of its 32 Federal Units:

Network	State
VA+ TV	Aguascalientes
Canal 8	Baja California Sur
TRC	Campeche
Canal 10 Chiapas	Chiapas
Coahuila Televisión	Coahuila
Canal 12	Colima
Capital 21	Mexico City
TVCuatro	Guanajuato
RTG	Guerrero
Hidalgo Televisión	Hidalgo
Jalisco TV	Jalisco
Mexiquense Televisión	State of Mexico
SM Televisión	Michoacán
Canal 15	Morelos
Tele10 Nayarit	Nayarit
Canal 28	Nuevo León
CORTV	Oaxaca
SICOM Televisión	Puebla
Televisión Querétaro	Querétaro
Nueve TV	San Luis Potosí
Telemax	Sonora
Televisión Tabasqueña	Tabasco
Tlaxcala Televisión	Tlaxcala
TVMás	Veracruz
Tele Yucatán	Yucatán
Canal 24, SIZART	Zacatecas

== See also ==
- List of television stations in Mexico
- Television in Mexico
