= Channel 15 TV stations in Mexico =

The following television stations broadcast on digital channel 15 in Mexico:

- XEFB-TDT in Monterrey, Nuevo León
- XHCSA-TDT in San Cristóbal de las Casas, Chiapas
- XHCRO-TDT in Carbó, Sonora
- XHCTCY-TDT in Querétaro, Querétaro
- XHD-TDT in Tampico, Tamaulipas
- XHFA-TDT in Nogales, Sonora
- XHJGMI-TDT in Uruapan, Michoacán
- XHMEE-TDT in Mexicali, Baja California
- XHMTPU-TDT in Puebla, Puebla
- XHOCH-TDT in Ojinaga, Chihuahua
- XHOQT-TDT in Oquitoa, Sonora
- XHPOX-TDT in Pinotepa Nacional, Oaxaca
- XHRON-TDT in Rayón, Sonora
- XHSAS-TDT in Santa Ana, Sonora
- XHSPRAG-TDT in Aguascalientes, Aguascalientes
- XHSPRZC-TDT in Zacatecas, Zacatecas
- XHTCM-TDT in Zitácuaro, Michoacán
- XHTJB-TDT in Tijuana, Baja California
- XHTV-TDT in Mexico City
- XHVTV-TDT in Matamoros, Tamaulipas
