= XHIRC-FM =

Radio station in Colima, Colima

- Colima, Colima; Mexico
- Frequency: 98.1 MHz
- Branding: Conexión 98.1 FM

Programming
- Format: Public radio

Ownership
- Owner: Government of the State of Colima
- Sister stations: XHAMO-TDT

History
- First air date: June 26, 1986 (as XEBCO-AM); May 1, 2007 (as XHIRC-FM)
- Call sign meaning: Instituto de la Radio Colimense (Colima Radio Institute, predecessor to ICRTV)

Technical information
- Class: B1
- ERP: 5 kW
- HAAT: 322.29 m
- Transmitter coordinates: 19°10′47″N 103°41′26″W

Links
- Website: ICRTV

XHIRC-FM is a radio station serving Colima, Colima, in central−western Mexico. The station is owned by the state of Colima through the Instituto Colimense de Radio y Televisión and broadcasts on 98.1 MHz.

== History ==
XHIRC is the successor to the first public radio station in the state of Colima.

=== XEBCO-AM ===
XEBCO-AM on 1210 kHz to the air on June 26, 1986, as part of a joint project between the Instituto Mexicano de la Radio and the state government of Colima. It was one of several new partnership stations between IMER and state governments established in the 1980s. Broadcasting with 50 kW power day and 5 kW night from its transmitter in Villa de Álvarez (still home to the radio studios of XHIRC), its signal covered the state of Colima as well as portions of Michoacán and Jalisco and carried programming from XEB-AM "Radio México", thus the XEBCO callsign. In the IMER era XEBCO was known as "Radio Occidente, La Voz de Colima".

In 1988, it was announced that XEBCO would begin broadcasting on FM, on 98.5 MHz; this never happened.

In 2004, IMER and the state government dissolved their partnership, as IMER was seeking to shed stations. In shuttering the Radio México Internacional shortwave and returning XEBCO and Campeche's XETEB to their state governments, the IMER cited their obsolete equipment and high cost to the agency. The new Instituto de la Radio Colimense (Colima Radio Institute) was formed to manage XEBCO. Under its management, from 2005, the station became known as "Conexión 1210 AM".

=== XHIRC-FM ===
In 2005, the state government of Colima sought to replace XEBCO with a station on the FM band. In 2006, the application was granted, and the state government received the permit for XHIRC-FM 98.1.

On April 30, 2007, XEBCO left the air for good. The next day, XHIRC-FM "Conexión 98.1 FM" signed on for the first time, under the aegis of the recently expanded Instituto Colimense de Radio y Televisión.
