= XHCPDE-TDT =

Television station in Tijuana

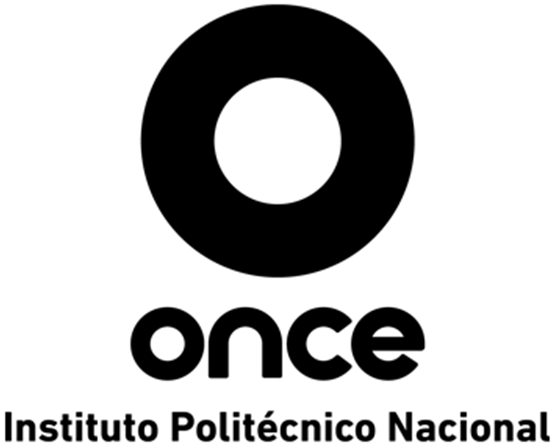
- Tijuana, Baja California; San Diego, California; Mexico–United States
- City: Tijuana, Baja California
- Channels: Digital: 15 (UHF); Virtual: 11

Programming
- Affiliations: 11.1: Canal Once; 11.2: Once Niñas y Niños

Ownership
- Owner: Instituto Politécnico Nacional

History
- Founded: August 2, 1999
- Former call signs: XHTJB-TV (1999–2013); XHTJB-TDT (2013–2021)
- Former channel numbers: Analog: 3 (VHF, 1999–2013); Digital: 46 (UHF, to 2017); Virtual: 3 (PSIP, 2009–October 2016)
- Call sign meaning: Templated call sign

Technical information
- Licensing authority: CRT
- ERP: 78.945 kW
- HAAT: 296.4 m (972 ft)
- Transmitter coordinates: 32°28′26.50″N 116°53′49.20″W

Links
- Website: Canal Once

XHCPDE-TDT (channel 11) is a television station in Tijuana, Baja California, Mexico. Broadcasting from Cerro Colorado with in the city limits of Tijuana, XHCPDE is a repeater of the Canal Once public network owned and operated by the Instituto Politécnico Nacional.

== History ==
In analog, the channel 3 allocation was initially not awarded to either San Diego or Tijuana—despite a severe need for additional VHF television channels in the area—because any high-powered signal would be short-spaced over water to KEYT-TV in Santa Barbara, California.

However, by the 1990s, Mexican stations using lower power could utilize the frequency. In 1995, Mexico notified the United States that it would be building channel 3, with a proposed 100 kW effective radiated power. Through American coordination, the power of the station was reduced and an antenna pattern was used to minimize the station's interference to the United States. As part of the IPN's program to build repeater stations to extend the reach of its then-Once TV, XHTJB-TV signed on August 2, 1999, analog channel 3, raising its power over several days to 40 kW of effective radiated power. It was the fourth repeater station built by the IPN itself, after stations in Cuernavaca, San Luis Potosí and Valle de Bravo. When XHTJB signed on in mid-1999, it immediately caused interference to those in San Diego who had their VCRs and other devices with output set to channel 3; international coordination forced the new station to ramp up power levels gradually in order to help users rectify potential interference. Cox Communications and other San Diego stations even mounted an unsuccessful campaign to move XHTJB to another channel; however, no other channel was found that could adequately cover the Tijuana area.

The call sign was changed from XHTJB to XHCPDE as a result of the re-award of the concession following an impermissibly late renewal filing, effective January 1, 2022. Tijuana and five other Canal Once transmitters changed call signs as a result.

== Technical information ==
=== Subchannels ===
The station's digital channel is multiplexed:

Subchannels of XHCPDE-TDT
Subchannel	Res.	Short name	Programming
11.1	1080i	XHCPDE	Canal Once
11.2	480i	XHCPDE	Once Niñas y Niños

=== Analog-to-digital conversion ===
XHTJB transitioned to digital in the late 2000s. Physical channel 46 remained after Tijuana's first-in-Mexico digital conversion occurred on July 18, 2013, initially using virtual channel 3, its former analog number.

On October 27, 2016, in line with a major realignment of Mexican virtual channels, XHTJB and other Canal Once transmitters adopted virtual channel 11 nationwide. The station was able to do so because XHTJB's signal pattern (unlike most Tijuana stations) does not overlap with Los Angeles stations, most importantly KTTV, which also is on virtual channel 11. The move freed channel 3 for use by Imagen Televisión's Tijuana transmitter.

In late 2017, XHTJB was approved to move to RF channel 15 for repacking purposes.
