= XHSLS-TDT =

State-owned public TV station in San Luis Potosí, San Luis Potosí

- San Luis Potosí, San Luis Potosí; Mexico
- Channels: Digital: 35; Virtual: 9
- Branding: Nueve TV

Ownership
- Owner: Gobierno del Estado de San Luis Potosí

History
- Founded: 1990
- Former call signs: XHSLS-TV (1990-2015)
- Former channel numbers: 9 (analog, VHF, 1990-2015)
- Call sign meaning: "San Luis"

Technical information
- Licensing authority: CRT
- ERP: 27.72 kW
- Transmitter coordinates: 22°03′51″N 100°39′00″W

Links
- Website: www.nuevetvslp.gob.mx/index.html

XHSLS-TDT (channel 9), known as Nueve TV, is a television station in San Luis Potosí, San Luis Potosí, Mexico, which is owned by the state government. It is known as Nueve TV and carries local and national public television programming.

== History ==
On November 1, 1985, the Dirección del Centro de Producción de Televisión Imevisión de San Luis Potosí (Imevisión Television Production Center San Luis Potosí) was launched to produce local opt-out programming for Imevisión. By 1990, given changing circumstances and the impending privatization of Imevisión, the agreement had been phased out, and instead a new television station was built, XHSLS-TV channel 9; XHSLS was permitted in May 1987 and replaced an earlier station on channel 7. It boasted repeaters in Matehuala (XHATS-TV channel 4, which stopped operating early in the 2000s) and Tamazunchale (XHAZS-TV channel 6). XHAZS never operated in digital, and its concession was not renewed.

XHSLS signed on in digital in July 2015. The digital facility was more powerful than the analog channel 9, whose actual effective radiated power was lower than authorized due to an aging transmitter. The station shut off its analog signal on December 16, 2015, along with other San Luis Potosí stations.
