= XHJGMI-TDT =

TV station in Uruapan, Michoacán, Mexico

Uruapan, Michoacán, Mexico; Mexico
- Channels: Digital: 15 (UHF); Virtual: 12
- Branding: Multimedios Televisión

Programming
- Affiliations: Commercial independent

Ownership
- Owner: Corporativo Trejo; (José Guadalupe Manuel Trejo García)

History
- First air date: February 12, 2018
- Call sign meaning: José Guadalupe Manuel Trejo García MIchoacán

Technical information
- ERP: 100 watts
- HAAT: -126.4 meters
- Transmitter coordinates: 19°25′24.3″N 102°03′57.9″W

XHJGMI-TDT, physical channel 15 and virtual channel 12, is a television station in Uruapan, Michoacán. The station is owned by Corporativo Trejo and is known as Multimedios Televisión (no relation to the Multimedios Televisión network), part of a larger media group known as Multimedios Michoacán.

== History ==
XHJGMI was awarded in the IFT-6 TV station auction of 2017 and signed on February 12, 2018. It was assigned virtual channel 12 in August 2018.
