= SICOM Televisión =

Public television network of Puebla, Mexico

XHPBZC-TDT
State of Puebla; Mexico
- Channels: Digital: 11 (VHF); Virtual: 16
- Branding: SICOM Televisión

Programming
- Affiliations: Independent educational Canal 22; TV UNAM; DW; Canal 44 de Guadalajara

Ownership
- Owner: Gobierno del Estado de Puebla

History
- Founded: November 26, 2003
- Former call signs: XHPZL-TV (1999-2004, Zacatlán); XHPUE-TV/-TDT (2003-2021, Puebla)
- Former channel numbers: 26 (analog, 2003–2015; digital virtual, 2015–2021)
- Former affiliations: Canal Once (to mid-2005)

Technical information
- Licensing authority: CRT
- Transmitter coordinates: 19°04′39″N 98°20′42″W

Links
- Website: sicom.gob.mx/television/

SICOM Televisión (virtual channel 16) is the statewide public television network of the Mexican state of Puebla, with transmitters in Puebla City and Zacatlán. It is part of the SICOM, Sistema Estatal de Telecomunicaciones (State Telecommunications System), which also provides public radio service in the state. Covering a little over 40% of the state (by population), it offers educational, cultural and alternative programming, much of which is locally generated content intended to address the needs, expectations and lives of Pueblan society. It also airs programming from Canal 22, TV UNAM, DW and Canal 44 de Guadalajara

The network has transmitters in Puebla City and Zacatlán.

== History ==
XHPUE-TV channel 26 received its permit in 2003, preceded by four years by the Zacatlán transmitter, originally permitted in 1999 as XHPZL-TV on channel 4. The original five-year permit for the Zacatlán transmitter expired in 2004, but XHPBZC-TDT 11 was not authorized as its replacement until 2017.

XHPUE was licensed for digital and analog transmissions on the same channel 26 in 2014; this made it one of the first two stations with such intermittent authorization, alongside XHMNL-TV in Monterrey. After several tests, it flash-cut to digital in March 2015.

On August 18, 2021, due to the impending expiration of the XHPUE-TDT concession at the end of the year, the Federal Telecommunications Institute (IFT) authorized the modification of XHPBZC-TDT's statutory coverage area to include the entire state of Puebla, conditioned on the surrender of the Puebla City concession, which took effect December 3, 2021. At the same time, the recently renamed SET Televisión began using virtual channel 16.

In 2023, the original SICOM name was restored after a state government study found that eight out of ten residents surveyed across 21 municipalities continued to call the state network SICOM despite being out of use for twelve years.

== Transmitters ==
RF	Location	ERP
11	Zacatlán	180 watts
26	Puebla City	72.8 kW
