= Canal 12 (Colima) =

State TV network of Colima, Mexico

XHCPAL-TDT
- Colima, Colima; Mexico
- Channels: Digital: 11 (VHF); Virtual: 12
- Branding: Canal 12

Ownership
- Owner: Gobierno del Estado de Colima
- Sister stations: XHIRC-FM

History
- Founded: 1989
- Former call signs: XHAMO-TV (1989–2015); XHAMO-TDT (2015–2021)
- Former channel numbers: 11 (analog and virtual, 1994-2016); 12 (analog, 1989-1994)
- Call sign meaning: Templated call sign

Technical information
- Licensing authority: CRT
- ERP: 1.15 kW
- Transmitter coordinates: 19°10′47″N 103°41′26″W
- Repeater: XHPBMZ-TDT (RF 13, 17.208 kW ERP) Manzanillo

Links
- Website: www.icrtvcolima.com

Canal 12 is the state public television network of the Mexican state of Colima. It is operated by the Instituto Colimense de Radio y Televisión (ICRTV) and broadcasts local and national educational and cultural programs.

== History ==
On June 3, 1989, XHAMO-TV, then known as "Tevecolima", was created by decree in the state's official newspaper. Its first test transmissions, then on channel 12, occurred on June 25, 1989, with the first official broadcasts the next day.

On June 26, 1994, XHAMO moved from channel 12 to 11 in order to avoid interference with new station XHCKW-TV channel 13. XHAMO would return to branding as channel 12 in 2016 as a consequence of the national clearing of channel 11 for its exclusive use by the IPN's Canal Once.

On February 10, 2007, XHAMO and Tevecolima were combined with the Instituto de la Radio Colimense to form ICRTV.

In December 2015, XHAMO began digital transmissions on the same physical channel 11, broadcasting at night until the analog shutoff on December 31, 2015. It was the second VHF digital television station to come to air in Mexico, after XHMTA-TDT in Matamoros, Tamaulipas.

A failure to file a timely renewal led to the Federal Telecommunications Institute (IFT) awarding a new concession, with the new templated call sign XHCPAL-TDT, to the state government starting on January 1, 2022.

On November 5, 2018, the IFT awarded the state government a concession to build channel 13 in Manzanillo, with call sign XHPBMZ-TDT, to rebroadcast Canal 12. In October 2021, an agreement was reached to co-site the transmitter with TV Azteca's facility, and the station launched on October 12.
