= XHBZC-TDT =

Public TV station in La Paz, Baja California Sur

- La Paz, Baja California Sur; Mexico
- Channels: Digital: 30 (UHF); Virtual: 8
- Branding: Canal 8

Ownership
- Owner: Gobierno del Estado de Baja California Sur

History
- Founded: April 6, 1994

Technical information
- Licensing authority: CRT
- ERP: 50.484 kW
- HAAT: −33.6 m (−110 ft)
- Transmitter coordinates: 24°09′38″N 110°18′06″W

Links
- Website: iert.bcs.gob.mx

XHBZC-TDT virtual channel 8, known on-air as Canal 8, is an educational and public television station owned and operated by the government of the State of Baja California Sur in La Paz. It is part of IERT, the Instituto Estatal de Radio y Televisión, and produces local programming including news and public affairs shows. It also airs programming from Canal Once.

== History ==
XHBZC received its permit in June 1994. In 2015, the station moved to digital on channel 30, using PSIP to appear to receivers as channel 8.1.
