= XHPBSA-TDT =

Public TV station in Saltillo, Coahuila, Mexico

- Saltillo, Coahuila; Mexico
- Channels: Digital: 17 (UHF); Virtual: 17
- Branding: Coahuila Televisión

Ownership
- Owner: Gobierno del Estado de Coahuila
- Sister stations: Coahuila Radio

History
- Founded: January 2020
- Call sign meaning: PABF SAltillo

Technical information
- Licensing authority: CRT
- ERP: 15.2 kW
- Transmitter coordinates: 25°23′23.48″N 100°59′54.71″W

Links
- Website: coahuilartv.com.mx

XHPBSA-TDT (channel 17) is a public television station in Saltillo, Coahuila, Mexico. It is owned by the state government of Coahuila and forms half of the Coahuila Radio y Televisión state broadcaster, alongside the 16-transmitter Coahuila Radio network. The studios and transmitter are co-located with Coahuila Radio in a state office building on Periférico Luis Echeverría.

== History ==
On February 15, 2016, the government of the state of Coahuila applied before the Federal Telecommunications Institute to build a new television station in Saltillo. On October 18, 2017, the IFT approved the application after a competing bid from the Sistema Público de Radiodifusión del Estado Mexicano, which would have had priority over the state government as a federal agency, was withdrawn.

In preparation for the new television station, on March 8, 2019, Radio Coahuila, the state agency that manages the radio network, was officially restructured into Coahuila Radio y Televisión. The XHPBSA transmitter was turned on in January 2020.
