= Once Niñas y Niños =

Mexican children's television network

- Broadcast area: Mexico; Texas

Programming
- Language: Spanish

Ownership
- Owner: Instituto Politécnico Nacional

History
- Launched: August 24, 2015; 11 years ago
- Former names: Once Niños (2015–2020)

Links
- Website: onceninasyninos.tv

Availability

Terrestrial
- IPN transmitters: 11.2

Once Niñas y Niños (Eleven Girls and Boys) is a Mexican children's television network owned by the Instituto Politécnico Nacional. It is a companion to the Canal Once public television network. Once Niñas y Niños is broadcast as a subchannel on the IPN's Canal Once transmitters and is a required channel for carriage on all pay television systems in Mexico; it also airs a programming block of children's programs on the main Canal Once channel.

== History ==
Canal Once launched Once Niños as its first digital subchannel on August 24, 2015. The channel would serve as an extension of the main channel's original children's programming for children between the ages of four and twelve; overnight, between midnight and 6am, it would not air programming, but instead an image inviting kids to go to sleep.

The name was modified from Once Niños to Once Niñas y Niños on January 15, 2020, as part of an initiative to promote gender parity; the name in Spanish had previously read Eleven Boys.

== Coverage ==
Once Niñas y Niños is available on the entire IPN-owned transmitter network, though not from SPR transmitters. It is also available as a subchannel of XHILA-TDT, The Grupo Intermedia commercial station in Mexicali, Baja California.
