= List of television stations in Tamaulipas =

The following is a list of all CRT-licensed over-the-air television stations broadcasting in the Mexican state of Tamaulipas. There are 41 television stations in Tamaulipas.

== List of television stations ==
RF	VC	Call sign	Location	Network/name	ERP	Concessionaire
23	1	XHBY-TDT	Ciudad Mante	Azteca Uno (adn Noticias)	8.45 kW	Televisión Azteca
34	2	XHMBT-TDT	Ciudad Mante	Las Estrellas	27 kW	Televimex
22	5	XHCMU-TDT	Ciudad Mante	Canal 5	27 kW	Radio Televisión
24	1	XHCVT-TDT	Ciudad Victoria	Azteca Uno (adn Noticias)	17.08 kW	Televisión Azteca
31	2	XHTK-TDT	Ciudad Victoria	Las Estrellas	80 kW	Televimex
20	3	XHCTVI-TDT	Ciudad Victoria	Imagen Televisión (Excélsior TV)	20.248 kW	Cadena Tres I, S.A. de C.V.
36	5	XHUT-TDT	Ciudad Victoria	Canal 5	80 kW	Radio Televisión
25	6	XHVTU-TDT	Ciudad Victoria	Canal 6 (Milenio Televisión, CGTN En Español, Popcorn Central)	20 kW	Multimedios Televisión
29	7	XHCDT-TDT	Ciudad Victoria	Azteca 7 (a+)	80.640 kW	Televisión Azteca
26	9	XHCVI-TDT	Ciudad Victoria	Nu9ve	80 kW	Teleimagen del Noroeste
12	14	XHCPBD-TDT	Ciudad Victoria	Canal Catorce (TV Migrante)	30 kW	Sistema Público de Radiodifusión del Estado Mexicano
30	2	XHLUT-TDT	La Rosita-Villagrán	Las Estrellas	35 kW	Televimex
12	1	XHMTA-TDT	Matamoros	Azteca Uno (adn Noticias)	75.123 kW	Televisión Azteca
15	6	XHVTV-TDT	El Control; Matamoros; Reynosa	Canal 6 (Milenio Televisión, CGTN En Español, Popcorn Central)	15 kW; 35 kW; 40 kW	Televisión Digital
33	7	XHOR-TDT	Matamoros; Reynosa	Azteca 7 (a+)	118.037 kW; 61.447 kW	Televisión Azteca
23	1	XHLNA-TDT	Nuevo Laredo	Azteca Uno (adn Noticias)	19.19 kW (Note: This is a temporary facility on the Multimedios tower due to the collapse of the TV Azteca tower in Nuevo Laredo in May 2021.)	Televisión Azteca
29	2	XHLAR-TDT	Nuevo Laredo	Las Estrellas	200 kW	Televimex
35	3	XHCTNL-TDT	Nuevo Laredo	Imagen Televisión (Excélsior TV)	143 kW	Cadena Tres I, S.A. de C.V.
25	4/5	XHBR-TDT	Nuevo Laredo	Televisa Regional (Canal 5)	200 kW	Televisora de Occidente
32	6	XHNAT-TDT	Nuevo Laredo	Canal 6 (Milenio Televisión, CGTN En Español, Popcorn Central)	54.34 kW	Multimedios Televisión
33	7	XHLAT-TDT	Nuevo Laredo	Azteca 7 (a+)	27.63 kW (Note: This is a temporary facility on the Multimedios tower due to the collapse of the TV Azteca tower in Nuevo Laredo in May 2021.)	Televisión Azteca
17	17	XEFE-TDT	Nuevo Laredo	Canal Once	100 kW	Ramona Esparza González
36	1	XHREY-TDT	Reynosa	Azteca Uno (adn Noticias)	61.240 kW	Televisión Azteca
28	2	XHTAM-TDT	Reynosa-Matamoros	Las Estrellas (Canal 5)	391.761 kW	Televimex
30	8	XHAB-TDT	Reynosa-Matamoros	Televisa Regional	348.027 kW	Televisora de Occidente
19	9	XERV-TDT	Reynosa-Matamoros	Las Estrellas	292.265 kW	Televisora de Occidente
9	11	XHCPCF-TDT	Reynosa	Canal Once (Once Niñas y Niños)	1.244 kW	Instituto Politécnico Nacional
22	13	XHCTRM-TDT	Reynosa; Matamoros	Imagen Televisión (Excélsior TV)	145.562 kW; 30 kW	Cadena Tres I, S.A. de C.V.
7	14	XHCPCE-TDT	Reynosa	Canal Catorce (TV Migrante)	35 kW	Sistema Público de Radiodifusión del Estado Mexicano
29	18	XHRBA-TDT	Río Bravo	Canal 18	11.160 kW	Patronato Pro-Difusión Social
21	1/7	XHFET-TDT	San Fernando	Azteca Uno (Azteca 7)	0.9 kW	Televisión Azteca
25	2	XHSFT-TDT	San Fernando	Las Estrellas	15 kW	Televimex
28	1/7	XHHP-TDT	Soto La Marina	Azteca Uno (Azteca 7)	5.09 kW	Televisión Azteca
32	2	XHSZT-TDT	Soto La Marina	Las Estrellas	20 kW	Televimex
29	1	XHWT-TDT	Tampico	Azteca Uno (adn Noticias)	30.2 kW	Televisión Azteca
17	2	XHGO-TDT	Tampico	Las Estrellas (N+ Foro)	180 kW	Televimex
25	3	XHCTTA-TDT	Tampico	Imagen Televisión (Excélsior TV)	100 kW	Cadena Tres I, S.A. de C.V.
16	4	XHTPZ-TDT	Tampico	Televisa Regional (9.1 Nu9ve)	180 kW	Televisora de Occidente
15	5	XHD-TDT	Tampico	Canal 5	180 kW	Radio Televisión
14	6	XHTAO-TDT	Tampico	Canal 6 (Milenio Televisión, City Channel, Popcorn Central)	12.5 kW	Multimedios Televisión
21	7	XHTAU-TDT	Tampico	Azteca 7 (a+)	30.54 kW	Televisión Azteca
35	14	XHSPRTA-TDT	Tampico	SPR multiplex (11.1 Canal Once, 14.1 Canal Catorce, 20.1 TV UNAM, 22.1 Canal 22)	20.42 kW	Sistema Público de Radiodifusión del Estado Mexicano

== Defunct stations ==
- XELD-TV 7, Matamoros (1951–1954)
- XHEW-TV 13, Matamoros (1991–2007, likely off air by 1999)

== See also ==
- List of television stations in Texas for stations across the US border
