= List of television stations in Nuevo León =

The following is a list of all CRT-licensed over-the-air television stations broadcasting in the Mexican state of Nuevo León. There are 38 television stations in Nuevo León.

== List of television stations ==
RF	VC	Call sign	Location	Network/name	ERP	Concessionaire
20	13	XHTMNL-TDT	Agualeguas	Telsusa (Canal 13)	70.1 kW	Telsusa Televisión México
19	1	XHWX-TDT	Monterrey; Guadalupe (RF 12); Saltillo, Coah. Sabinas Hidalgo	Azteca Uno (adn Noticias)	429.706 kW; 9.27 kW; 13.605 kW; 8.549 kW	Televisión Azteca
23	2	XHX-TDT	Monterrey; Saltillo, Coah. Sabinas Hidalgo	Las Estrellas (N+ Foro)	200 kW; 45 kW; 4.8 kW	Televimex
22	3	XHCTMY-TDT	Monterrey	Imagen Televisión (Excélsior TV)	130 kW	Cadena Tres I, S.A. de C.V.
15	4	XEFB-TDT	Monterrey; Saltillo, Coah.	Televisa Regional	200 kW; 43 kW	Televisora de Occidente
31	5	XET-TDT	Monterrey	Canal 5	200 kW	Radio Televisión
25	6	XHAW-TDT	Monterrey; Guadalupe (RF 26); Saltillo, Coah.	Canal 6 (Milenio Televisión, RG La Deportiva TV, Popcorn Central)	120 kW; 20 kW; 37.5 kW	Televisión Digital
17	7	XHFN-TDT	Monterrey; Guadalupe (RF 11); Sabinas Hidalgo	Azteca 7 (a+)	342.072 kW; 9.292 kW; 8.588 kW	Televisión Azteca
34	8	XHCNL-TDT	Cadereyta Jiménez-Monterrey	Televisa Regional	200 kW	Televisora de Occidente
32	9	XHMOY-TDT	Monterrey	Nu9ve	200 kW	Teleimagen del Noroeste
36	11	XHPBMY-TDT	Monterrey	Canal Once (Once Niñas y Niños)	60 kW	Instituto Politécnico Nacional
16	14	XHSPRMT-TDT	Monterrey	SPR multiplex (14.1 Canal Catorce, 20.1 TV UNAM, 22.1 Canal 22)	35.53 kW	Sistema Público de Radiodifusión del Estado Mexicano
28	28	XHMNL-TDT	Monterrey; (with 23 repeaters statewide)	Canal 28	139.54 kW	Gobierno del Estado de Nuevo León
35	53	XHMNU-TDT	Monterrey	Canal 53	250 kW	Universidad Autónoma de Nuevo León
36	3	XHCTSH-TDT	Sabinas Hidalgo	Imagen Televisión (Excélsior TV)	10 kW	Cadena Tres I, S.A. de C.V.

== See also ==
- List of television stations in Texas for stations across the US border serving cities in Nuevo León
