= List of television stations in Guerrero =

The following is a list of all IFT-licensed over-the-air television stations broadcasting in the Mexican state of Guerrero. There are 25 television stations in Guerrero.

== List of television stations ==
RF	VC	Call sign	Location	Network/name	ERP	Concessionaire
14	1	XHIE-TDT	Acapulco	Azteca Uno (adn40)	44.39 kW	Televisión Azteca
32	2	XHAP-TDT	Acapulco	Las Estrellas (FOROtv)	15 kW	Televimex
21	3	XHCTAC-TDT	Acapulco	Imagen Televisión (Excélsior TV)	30 kW	Cadena Tres I, S.A. de C.V.
33	4	XHCPFU-TDT	Acapulco	Radio y Televisión de Guerrero	5.79 kW	Gobierno del Estado de Guerrero
23	5	XHAL-TDT	Acapulco	Canal 5	15 kW	Radio Televisión
36	7	XHACC-TDT	Acapulco	Azteca 7 (a+)	36.6 kW	Televisión Azteca
22	9	XHACZ-TDT	Acapulco	Nu9ve	15 kW	Teleimagen del Noroeste
30		XHSPG-TDT	Acapulco		32.92 kW	Sistema Público de Radiodifusión del Estado Mexicano
24	1	XHCER-TDT	Chilpancingo	Azteca Uno (adn40)	17.66 kW	Televisión Azteca
20	2	XHCK-TDT	Chilpancingo	Las Estrellas (FOROtv)	50 kW	Televimex
25	3	XHCTCP-TDT	Chilpancingo	Imagen Televisión (Excélsior TV)	20 kW	Cadena Tres I, S.A. de C.V.
35	4	XHCPFW-TDT	Chilpancingo	Radio y Televisión de Guerrero	0.4349 kW	Gobierno del Estado de Guerrero
34	5	XHCHN-TDT	Chilpancingo	Canal 5 (Nu9ve)	50 kW	Radio Televisión
28	7	XHCHL-TDT	Chilpancingo	Azteca 7 (a+)	17.58 kW	Televisión Azteca
15		XHCPCQ-TDT	Chilpancingo		46.253 kW	Sistema Público de Radiodifusión del Estado Mexicano
30	1	XHIR-TDT	Iguala	Azteca Uno (adn40)	6.19 kW	Televisión Azteca
26	2	XHIGG-TDT	Iguala	Las Estrellas	43 kW	Televimex
31	5	XHIGN-TDT	Iguala	Canal 5	43 kW	Radio Televisión
29	7	XHTUX-TDT	Iguala	Azteca 7	6.16 kW	Televisión Azteca
26	2	XHOMT-TDT	Ometepec	Las Estrellas	43 kW	Televimex
23	1	XHIB-TDT	Taxco	Azteca Uno (adn40)	7.18 kW	Televisión Azteca
34	2	XHTGG-TDT	Tecpan de Galeana	Las Estrellas	24 kW	Televimex
22	1	XHDU-TDT	Zihuatanejo	Azteca Uno (adn40)	42.5 kW	Televisión Azteca
27	2	XHIZG-TDT	Ixtapa and Zihuatanejo	Las Estrellas	40 kW	Televimex
28	5	XHIXG-TDT	Ixtapa and Zihuatanejo	Canal 5	40 kW	Radio Televisión
25	7	XHIXZ-TDT	Zihuatanejo	Azteca 7	42.38 kW	Televisión Azteca
