= XHTX-TDT =

Television station in Tuxtla Gutiérrez, Chiapas, Mexico

Tuxtla Gutiérrez, Chiapas; Mexico
- City: Tuxtla Gutiérrez, Chiapas
- Channels: Digital: 24 (UHF); Virtual: 8

Programming
- Affiliations: Multimedios Televisión; XHGC; XHTV; XEW; XEQ; Televisa Regional

Ownership
- Owner: Grupo PARAM COM Televisa; (Telemisión, S.A. de C.V.)

History
- Founded: October 12, 1968
- Former channel numbers: 8 (analog and digital virtual, 1968-2016); 5 (digital virtual, 2016-2018)
- Call sign meaning: TuXtla Gutiérrez

Technical information
- ERP: 45 kW
- HAAT: -81.6 m
- Transmitter coordinates: 16°44′01.08″N 93°09′14.9″W

Links
- Website: grupoparam.com

XHTX-TDT is a television station in Tuxtla Gutiérrez, Chiapas. The station is owned by Telemisión, S.A. de C.V., a business of the Partida Amador family.

== History ==
XHTX, on analog channel 8, was the first television station to sign on in Chiapas. Like a number of other old-line local stations, it was built in time for the 1968 Summer Olympics, receiving its concession on October 7 of that year and beginning transmissions October 12. The station was owned by José de Jesús Partida Villanueva, who had been involved in the operations of several Chiapas radio stations (including XEWM and XEUI).

After the Games, XHTX began regular broadcasts, with local programming and national network programs from XHGC and XHTV. It broadcast from the tower used by radio station XEON and two additional transmitters in Ocozocoautla and San Cristóbal de las Casas. By 1979, the station had switched to primarily repeating XEW and XEQ Canal 9 de Televisa. The station was also known as Televisur.

In 1994, Televisa obtained its own transmitter in Tuxtla Gutiérrez, XHTUA-TV, as part of a 62-station concession. XEW programs moved to XHTUA and XHTX became a Canal 5 repeater. On January 1, 2019, Canal 5—and virtual channel 5.1—moved to a subchannel of XHTUA, leaving XHTX without any programs, as a result of the disaffiliation of Telemisión from Televisa. XHTX returned to virtual channel 8. When the station migrated to digital, it moved to Televisa's Cerro Mactumactza site from its original studio facility and analog tower, located at 14 Poniente and 13 Norte in the El Mirador neighborhood of Tuxtla Gutiérrez. That site was rebuilt and returned to service in 2021
