= XHTPZ-TDT =

Television station in Tampico, Tamaulipas, Mexico

- Tampico, Tamaulipas; Mexico
- Channels: Digital: 16 (UHF) Virtual: 4/9
- Branding: Televisa del Golfo

Programming
- Affiliations: Televisa Regional; Univision

Ownership
- Owner: TelevisaUnivision; (Televisora de Occidente, S.A. de C.V.)
- Sister stations: XHGO-TDT, XHD-TDT

History
- Founded: 1994
- Former channel numbers: Analog: 24 (UHF, 1994–2015); Digital: 39 (UHF, 2012-2018); Virtual: 24 (2012-2018)
- Call sign meaning: Tampico

Technical information
- Licensing authority: CRT
- ERP: 180 kW
- Transmitter coordinates: 22°13′28″N 97°52′02″W

Links
- Website: www.televisadelgolfo.tv

XHTPZ-TDT is a television station in Tampico, Tamaulipas, Mexico broadcasting on virtual channel 4. It is the Televisa local station for Tampico, with local news and programming alongside a selection of other Televisa programs (mainly from Televisa Networks, Televisa Guadalajara and Televisa Monterrey). The station carries programs from Univision.

== History ==
XHTPZ was awarded as part of the 1994 62-station concession to Radiotelevisora de México Norte, a subsidiary of Televisa. It broadcast on analog channel 24.

On August 26, 2018, XHTPZ moved to virtual channel 4.

In 2018, the concessions of all non-network Televisa Regional stations were consolidated in the concessionaire Televisora de Occidente, S.A. de C.V., as part of a corporate reorganization of Televisa's concessionaires.

== Digital television ==
Logo used on Channel 24 from 2005 to 2018

=== Digital subchannels ===
XHTPZ broadcasts on physical channel 16 (virtual channel 4.1). In February 2018, it started to broadcast FOROtv on its second subchannel; this moved to Las Estrellas transmitter XHGO-TDT in line with other cities in June 2018.

On January 1, 2020, XHTPZ activated a Nu9ve subchannel using major virtual channel 9. Prior to this date, Nu9ve was seen on XHFW-TDT alongside that station's local programming.

Channel	Video	Aspect	Callsign	Network	Programming
4.1	1080i	16:9	XHTPZ	Televisa Regional	Main XHTPZ programming
9.1	480i	16:9	XHTPZ	Nu9ve	Nu9ve

Prior to repacking on October 18, 2018, XHTPZ broadcast on physical channel 39.
