= XHFM-TDT =

Television station in Veracruz

- Veracruz, Veracruz; Mexico
- Channels: Digital: 24 (UHF); Virtual: 12
- Branding: TeleVer

Programming
- Affiliations: Televisa Regional

Ownership
- Owner: Grupo Televisa; (Televisa de Occidente S.A. de C.V.)

History
- Founded: 1962
- First air date: August 27, 1963
- Former call signs: XHFM-TV (1965–2015)
- Former affiliations: Televisión Independiente de México (1965-1972)

Technical information
- Licensing authority: CRT

XHFM-TDT (channel 12), branded as TeleVer (Televisa Veracruz) is an independent television station in Veracruz, Veracruz, Mexico. The station is part of the Televisa Regional network. In addition to local programming, its multiplex is also in charge of the relays of Las Estrellas (2.1) and Canal 5 (5.1).

== History ==
Telever was founded in 1962 by Carlos Ferráez Matos.

XHFM-TV was set up by Televisión Independiente de México, who had signed on their first station in Monterrey in 1963, and was eyeing nationwide expansion. The station was licensed to Televisión del Golfo, S.A. and broadcast on VHF channel 2, relaying Canal 8. Ahead of its summer 1963 launch, the station received Donald H. Coyle as its programming purchasing agent and sales representant, working for ABC International. The license started its commercial broadcasts in November 1966.

After the 1973 TIM-TSM merger, the station was integrated into Televisa's regional framework, first by becoming a relayer of XHTV-TV. From June 1, 1983, it adopted the Telever brand by connecting to XHAI-TV in Las Lajas and XHP-TV in Puebla. XHFM became the flagship of the new tri-state network which encompassed Veracruz, Puebla and Tlaxcala. During Telever's initial phase, it operated from 2pm to 2am daily. A few months after the launch of the new Telever, the station shared a report with RTV (the government's station) in November that year of the Acosta Lagunes government. By 1985, it had four repeaters installed throughout the state.

In April 2001, the station joined Galavisión, led by XEQ.

== Subchannels ==
Canal 44 subchannels
Channel	Res.	Short name	Programming
12.1	1080i	Telever	Main XHG programming
2.1	1080i	Las Estrellas	Las Estrellas relay
5.1	1080i	Canal 5	Canal 5 relay
