= XHCNL-TDT =

Television station in Monterrey, Nuevo León, Mexico

- Cadereyta Jiménez–Monterrey, Nuevo León; Mexico
- City: Cadereyta Jiménez, Nuevo León
- Channels: Digital: 34 (UHF); Virtual: 8
- Branding: Canal 8 Televisa Monterrey

Programming
- Affiliations: Televisa Regional (1988-present; full time from 2006 until 2016); Univision

Ownership
- Owner: Grupo Televisa; (Televisora de Occidente, S.A. de C.V.)
- Sister stations: XHX-TDT; XEFB-TDT; XET-TDT; XHMOY-TDT

History
- First air date: October 25, 1988
- Former call signs: XHCNL-TV (1988–2015)
- Former channel numbers: Analog: 34 (UHF; 1988-2015); Digital: 48 (UHF; to 2017); Virtual: 34 (2013–2017)
- Former affiliations: FOROtv
- Call sign meaning: Cadereyta, Nuevo León

Technical information
- Licensing authority: CRT
- Facility ID: 704795
- ERP: 200 kW
- HAAT: 975.9 m (3,202 ft)
- Transmitter coordinates: 25°37′52″N 100°14′04″W

XHCNL-TDT (channel 8), branded as Canal 8 Televisa Monterrey, is a TelevisaUnivision owned-and-operated television station licensed to Cadereyta Jiménez, Nuevo León, Mexico, serving the Monterrey metropolitan area. The station's signal is also carried on the Sky México satellite service on channel 152. XHCNL broadcasts programming from Univision and XHG Canal 4.

== History ==
XHCNL came to air in the late 1980s as an oddity in a large concession primarily awarded to expand Televisa's reach in rural areas. In the mid-1990s, it raised its power and became known as "Tu Objetivo Visual", carrying some local programs. In 2006, a swap between XEFB and XHCNL resulted in XHCNL becoming Televisa Monterrey (or Monterrey Televisión), the local station for Monterrey with news and local productions. It also picked up XEFB's translator in Saltillo, Coahuila. On October 27, 2016, the change was reversed, with local programs moving to XEFB (now on virtual channel 4) and Teleactiva moving to channel 34.

== Programming of Univision ==
- El Gordo y la Flaca
- Primer Impacto
- Aquí y Ahora

== Programming of XHG Canal 4 ==
- Qué Pokar! El juego de la fama
- Qué Quiere la Banda

== Digital television ==
The station's digital signal currently features two subchannels:

Channel	Res.	Short name	Programming
8.1	1080i	XHCNL	Main XHCNL programming
8.2	480i	XHCNL	CV Shopping

On September 24, 2015, XHCNL shut off its analog signal; its digital signal on UHF channel 48 remained.

In 2017, XHCNL moved from physical channel 48 to its former analog channel 34 in order to clear the 600 MHz band for mobile services.

On December 23, 2017, XHCNL changed virtual channels from 34 to 8. In 2016, XHCNL added a shopping channel partly owned by Televisa, CJ Grand Shopping, on its second digital subchannel; the channel was removed in March 2019 after Televisa divested its 50% stake in the channel in 2018. In June, a new CV Shopping channel wholly owned by Televisa was added to XHCNL's second subchannel.

=== Repeaters ===
Two repeaters provide fill-in coverage in the Monterrey metropolitan area:

RF	Location	ERP
34	Col. Country; Cerro El Mirador	1 kW
34	General Escobedo	.220 kW
