= XHCJE-TDT =

Television station in Ciudad Juárez

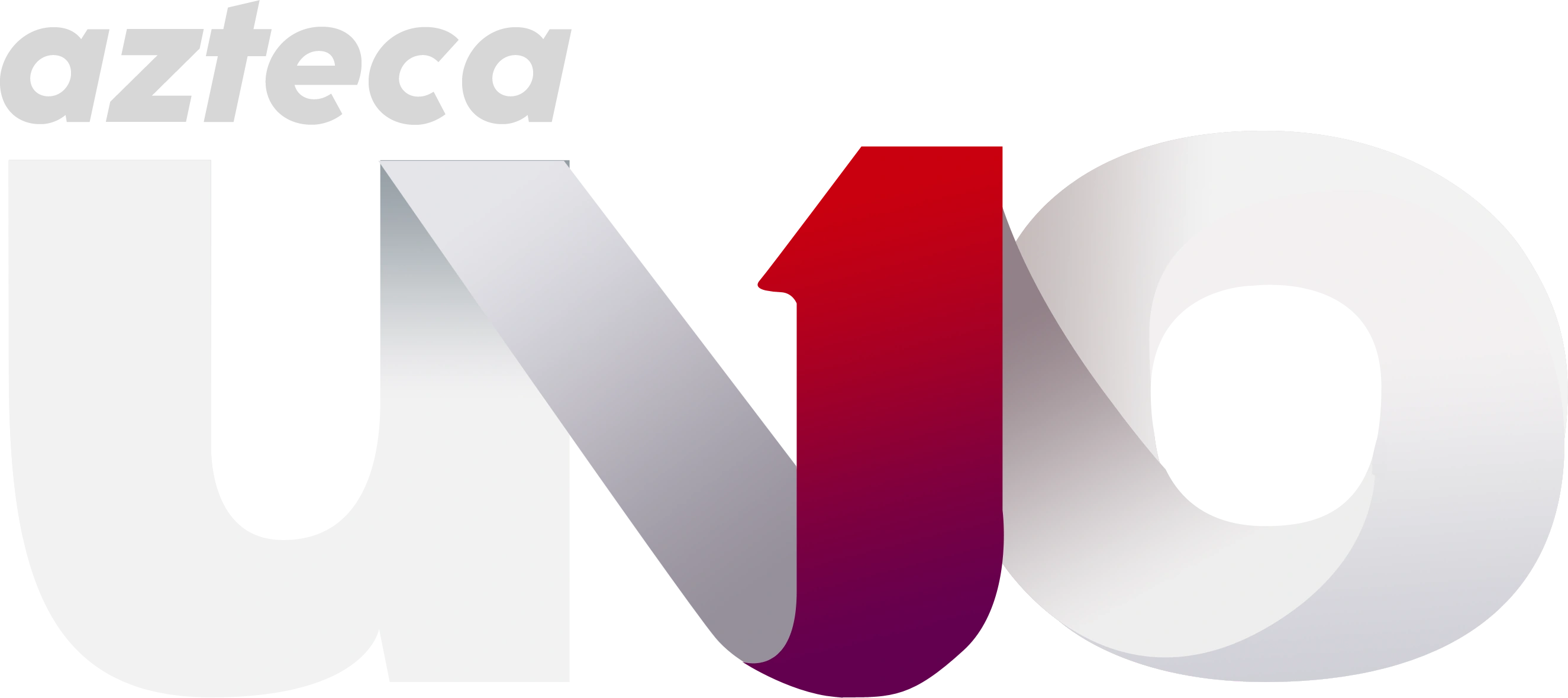
- Logo used since 2023
- Ciudad Juárez, Chihuahua; Mexico
- Channels: Digital: 34 (UHF); Virtual: 1
- Branding: Azteca Uno Ciudad Juárez

Programming
- Affiliations: 1.1: Azteca Uno; 1.2: ADN Noticias

Ownership
- Owner: TV Azteca; (Televisión Azteca, S.A. de C.V.)
- Sister stations: XHCJH-TDT

History
- Founded: 1980
- First air date: 1981
- Former call signs: XHJCE-TV (1981–2016)
- Former channel numbers: Analog: 11 (VHF, 1980–2015); Virtual: 11 (until 2016)
- Call sign meaning: XH Ciudad Juárez

Technical information
- Licensing authority: CRT
- ERP: 146.31 kW
- HAAT: 568 m (1,864 ft)
- Transmitter coordinates: 31°44′24.00″N 106°28′41.00″W

Links
- Website: aztecachihuahua.com

XHCJE-TDT (channel 1) is a television station in Ciudad Juárez, Chihuahua, Mexico, broadcasting programming from Azteca Uno. The station is owned by the TV Azteca subsidiary of Grupo Salinas.

== History ==
The station signed on in 1981, initially as a satellite of XHCH-TV, at the time a rare local station owned by then-Mexican public broadcaster Imevisión. Ricardo Salinas Pliego would acquire Imevisión in 1993, becoming TV Azteca; local facilities opened on August 11, 1992. In 2005, XHCJE-TV began broadcasting in high definition. The channel was then reassigned to channel 1 in 2016, as part of a nationwide move of Azteca Trece to that virtual channel.

XHCJE-TV shares resources with El Paso Telemundo affiliate KTDO and NBC affiliate KTSM-TV, especially with violence in Juárez.

== Programming ==
Currently, XHCJE-TDT broadcasts the entire schedule of Azteca Uno, with local advertisements and local news broadcasts. News opt-outs Hechos Meridiano Juárez, a news program that debuted in 2001 to compete against the Noticiero 56 newscast on competing station XHJUB (now Las Noticias on XEPM). A morning broadcast, Hechos AM Bajío, is broadcast weekdays at 7:00 am, anchored by Atziri del Valle. Hechos Meridiano Juárez is broadcast weekdays at 2:30 pm., and is anchored by Santiago Espinoza and Ale Magaña. An evening newscast, Hechos Noche Juárez, is broadcast weeknights at 10:15 p.m., anchored by Lety Villarreal. Local inserts are also broadcast during Azteca Uno's morning program, Hechos AM.

XHCJE also broadcasts games of the Indios de Ciudad Juárez soccer club, broadcast on tape delay Fridays at 11:45 p.m.

== Technical information ==
=== Subchannels ===
The station's digital signal is multiplexed:

Subchannels of XHCJE-TDT
| Channel | Res. | Short name | Programming |
|---|---|---|---|
| 1.1 | 1080i | XHCJE | Azteca Uno |
| 1.2 | 1080i | XHCJE | ADN Noticias |

On November 29, 2012, XHCJE began broadcasting the Proyecto 40 network (now known as ADN 40) on digital subchannel 34.3 (virtual channel 11.2, later 1.2).

=== Analog-to-digital conversion ===
Due to the Mexican analog-to-digital conversion mandate, XHCJE's analog signal on channel 11 left the air on July 14, 2015.
