= XHGO-TDT =

Television station in Tampico

- Tampico, Tamaulipas; Mexico
- Channels: Digital: 17 (UHF); Virtual: 2

Programming
- Subchannels: 2.1: Las Estrellas; 2.2: N+ Foro

Ownership
- Owner: Grupo Televisa; (Televimex, S.A. de C.V.)

History
- First air date: 1960 (concession); 1965 (programming)
- Former call signs: XHGO-TV (1965–2015)
- Former channel numbers: 7 (VHF analog, 1965–2015)
- Former affiliations: Televisa Regional (1965–mid 1990s)
- Call sign meaning: Golfo (from its former concessionaire Televisora del Golfo, S.A. de C.V.)

Technical information
- Licensing authority: CRT
- ERP: 180,294 kW

Links
- Website: www.lasestrellas.tv

XHGO-TDT (channel 2), is a Las Estrellas television station in Tampico, Tamaulipas, Mexico. The station is owned by Grupo Televisa with its transmitter operated by Televimex.

XHGO was founded by the Azcárraga family in 1960 and signed on in 1965 on channel 7. Its concessionaire is Televimex.

== History ==
In 1960, a construction permit for XHGO-TV in Ciudad Madero was issued; this was acquired by the end of the year by the Azcárraga family who wanted to link it with a station in Mexico City. In 1963, XHGO conducted color test transmissions, using the simplified two-color system developed by Guillermo González Camarena, at a time when the Mexican government decided to make UHF stations as experimental color operations.

Until the mid-90s, the station was a fully-local operation. This changed when XHTPZ-TV (channel 24) signed on as part of the 1994 62-station concession package given to Radiotelevisora de México Norte. Consequently, XHGO joined El Canal de las Estrellas while Televisa Regional moved to the new station.

== Technical information ==
=== Subchannels ===
| Channel | Video | Short name | Programming |
|---|---|---|---|
| 2.1 | 1080i | XHGO | Main XHGO-TDT programming / Las Estrellas |
| 2.2 | 480i | XHGO | N+ Foro |

XHGO operates a two-channel multiplex with Las Estrellas and N+ Foro.

=== Analog-to-digital conversion ===
XHGO shut down its analog signal on January 14, 2015, in line with other stations in the state of Tamaulipas.
