= José Marroquín Leal =

Mexican actor and TV host

- Born: José Marroquín Leal; April 1, 1933; Monterrey, Nuevo León, Mexico
- Died: February 6, 1998 (aged 64); Monterrey, Nuevo León, Mexico

José Marroquín Leal (April 1, 1933 – February 6, 1998) was a Mexican actor, notable for playing a clown known as Pipo. He hosted a children's TV show in Monterrey. He was locally known as "El Rey de los Payasos" (King of the clowns) and hosted the show from 1964 until his death in 1998.

== Biography ==
He was Director of the Drama School of the Autonomous University of Nuevo León. Through this position, he developed a friendship with TV host Horacio Alvarado Ortiz which later helped him start his career in mass media.

In 1961, XHX-TV bought the licensing rights to make the Mexican version of Bozo the Clown, and José Marroquín was invited to play the role of Bozo. After much deliberation, José Marroquín accepted. The show aired in Mexico on December 18, 1961. During this show, the segment Aventuritas (little adventures) was started, a segment that would later evolve Aventuritas de Pipo.

He continued playing Bozo the Clown until his license expired in 1963. The network decided not renew the license, on budget concerns. At this time, José Marroquín and other executives at the network, decided to create a new character and concept. Creative Artists Francisco Castillo and Carlos Vazquez were supervised by Marroquín to develop this new concept.

On January 20, 1964, the show and the clown "Pipo" were born. His costume consisted of orange hair, oversized shoes, and a round, red nose. It was first aired in front of a live audience. It was an instant hit, and it became a tradition for children in Monterrey to tune into Pipo every afternoon.

José Marroquín later created other characters for the show, most notably Profesor Pilocho (played by Carlos Torres), intended to be Pipo's guidance.

The Aventuritas de Pipo segment was also very popular. On every show Pipo and Profesor Pilocho would have an adventure somewhere, always stepping against Los malitos ("the meanies").

The show aired for 34 years on XEFB-TV until February 6, 1998, when Jose Marroquin failed to show up on the set. When associates and friends arrived to Marroquin's home later that day they found he had died in his sleep.

== Legacy ==
His death caused thousands of people in Monterrey to mourn him deeply. His funeral services were broadcast and watched by many.

A downtown street in Monterrey and a park in Guadalupe, Nuevo León have been renamed in his honor.

Recently, commemorating the 50th anniversary of the first television broadcasts in Monterrey, an actor was cast to reprise the character, and is playing the role for the new generations.
