= XEJ-TDT =

Television station in Ciudad Juárez

- Ciudad Juárez, Chihuahua; Mexico
- Channels: Digital: 35 (UHF); Virtual: 50
- Branding: XEJ Canal 50; XEJ Noticias (newscasts)

Programming
- Subchannels: 50.1: XEJ; 50.2: Once Niñas y Niños

Ownership
- Owner: Televisión de la Frontera, S.A. de C.V.

History
- First air date: May 17, 1954
- Former call signs: XEJ-TV (1954–2016)
- Former channel numbers: 5 (analog and virtual, 1954–2016); 50 (digital, 2012–2018)
- Former affiliations: SIN (1960s–1984); Televisa local (1985–1991); Nu9ve (until 2019)
- Call sign meaning: Carried from the XEJ-AM call sign

Technical information
- ERP: 10 kW
- HAAT: 62 m (203 ft) (analog)
- Transmitter coordinates: 31°42′21.00″N 106°28′41.00″W

Links
- Website: XEJ

XEJ-TDT (channel 50) is a television station in Ciudad Juárez, Chihuahua, Mexico, owned and operated by the Meneses Hoyos family. It is currently an independent television station.

== History ==
Founded by Pedro Meneses Hoyos on May 17, 1954, it was the first TV station in the state of Chihuahua, the first Spanish channel in the Juárez-El Paso-Las Cruces area, and the third Mexican TV station outside of Mexico City. It was described as the lowest-cost TV startup in the world, costing about $75,000, due to its use of a basic equipment setup and a used transmitter from El Paso station KROD-TV.

XEJ launched the careers of several music, film and TV personalities, including Tin Tan, Lorenzo de Monteclaro, Charro Avitia, and Alberto Aguilera (aka Adan Luna and/or Juan Gabriel). In the early days, the station broadcast many entertaining programs such as "El barco de la illusion", "Doctora Corazon", "Noches Rancheras", "La hora del aficionado", "Papa Quinito", "Niko Liko" (the clown).

XEPM-TV was named for Pedro Meneses when it signed on in the 1960s, in acknowledgement of his role in establishing television in Juárez. The Meneses Hoyos family also owns another television station that is named for them, XHMH-TDT in Hidalgo del Parral.

XEJ was long a partner and affiliate station of Televisa, most recently carrying its Nu9ve network along with other programming, including XEJ Noticias local newscasts, on its main 50.1 subchannel. On October 2, 2019, the Federal Telecommunications Institute authorized Televisa to begin carrying Nu9ve itself, as a subchannel (10.1) of XHJUB-TDT; Nu9ve programming moved there on November 1, leaving XEJ-TDT independent. A fire consumed its historic studios a few months earlier; a demolition was planned for a later date.

== Technical information ==
The digital signal was activated on June 1, 2012. It remained after Juárez's digital transition took place on July 14, 2015, at which time analog channel 5 left the air.

In March 2018, in order to facilitate the repacking of TV services out of the 600 MHz band (channels 38–51), XEJ was assigned channel 35 for continued digital operations. The frequency change took place on September 10, 2018.

=== Subchannels ===
XEJ carries a second digital subchannel, TVA Televisión Alternativa, which launched on June 2, 2012. It broadcasts in high definition and carries music videos 24 hours a day. The station does not have formal authorization from the IFT for this subchannel. In October 2016, XEJ began carrying Gala TV in HD, simultaneous with its IFT-mandated change from virtual channel 5 to 50 (as virtual channel 5 was reserved nationally for the Canal 5 network).

Subchannels of XEJ-TDT
Channel	Res.	Short name	Programming
50.1	1080i	XEJ	Main XEJ programming
50.2	1080i	XEJ	Once Niñas y Niños
