= XHA-TDT =

TV station in Durango, Durango, Mexico

- Durango, Durango; Mexico
- Channels: Digital: 36 (UHF); Virtual: 10
- Branding: Canal 10

Ownership
- Owner: TV Diez Durango, S.A. de C.V.
- Sister stations: XHCK-FM

History
- First air date: April 1, 1967
- Former call signs: XHA-TV (1967–2015)
- Former channel numbers: 10 (analog VHF; 1967–2015)
- Former affiliations: Nu9ve; Televisa Regional

Technical information
- Licensing authority: CRT
- ERP: 50 kW
- HAAT: −104.5 m (−343 ft)
- Transmitter coordinates: 24°01′12.35″N 104°40′56.28″W

Links
- Website: canal10.com.mx

XHA-TDT is a television station in Durango, Durango, Mexico. XHA broadcasts on virtual channel 10 (physical channel 36) and is currently an independent station.

== History ==
While an initial concession specified channel 11, XHA-TV signed on channel 10 and began full commercial broadcasts on April 1, 1967. The station was owned by Bertha Bradley Vda. de Stevenson, the widow of one of the state's pioneering broadcasters. Alejandro O. Stevenson, however, died on December 10, 1966, after a long illness, unable to see the television station he had helped to found broadcast. XHA maintained a partnership with Televisa and carried programming from its channel 9 network, and as a Televisa partner, TV Diez Durango is defined as within the "preponderant economic agent" in broadcasting for regulatory purposes. In 2014, XHA sourced 64 percent of its broadcast day from Televisa.

In 2018, XHA disaffiliated from Televisa amidst the unwinding of many local relationships, as Televisa began to multiplex Gala TV on subchannels of its own TV stations in some areas of the country where said programming had been broadcast on a local station, including Durango.

== Programming ==
XHA's local newscasts are known as Tiempo y Espacio; this news program began broadcasting on TV in 1992 after beginning on XECK radio, and it continues to air on XHCK-FM. The station also produces a morning magazine, Como en Casa.
