= XHKG-TDT =

Television station in Tepic, Nayarit, Mexico

- Tepic, Nayarit; Mexico
- Channels: Digital: 36 (UHF); Virtual: 4.1 (HD)
- Branding: XHKG TV Nayarit

Ownership
- Owner: XHKG TV Nayarit, S.A. de C.V.

History
- Founded: October 12, 1968
- Former channel numbers: 10 (analog); 2 (analog and digital virtual, to 2016)
- Former affiliations: Televisa (to 2018)
- Call sign meaning: Combination assigned by the IFT

Technical information
- Licensing authority: Federal Telecommunications Institute (IFT)
- ERP: 20.04 kW
- HAAT: 444.4 m (1,458 ft)
- Transmitter coordinates: 21°31′48″N 104°54′55″W

Links
- Website: None (Operations through Facebook XHKGTVNayarit)

XHKG-TDT is a television station in Tepic, Nayarit, Mexico. XHKG broadcasts on virtual channel 4.1 (physical channel 36) and is currently an independent station.

== History ==
XHKG signed on the air, initially on channel 10, on October 12, 1968. It was the first television station in Nayarit, signing on in time to provide television coverage of the 1968 Summer Olympics. The station, which later moved from channel 10 to 2, was owned by Roberto Mondragón González. Originally serving as a full-time repeater of Televisa national programming, it began broadcasting local programming in 1984. Roberto Mondragón and his son died in the 1985 Mexico City earthquake, while staying in the Hotel Regis; as a result, the concession was transferred to his wife, Lucía Pérez Medina.

In 2016, XHKG was forced to move to virtual channel 4.1 as the result of channel 2 nationally being reserved for the Las Estrellas network. XHKG maintained a partnership with Televisa and carried programming from its Gala TV network and FOROtv, even though it was listed as carrying no Televisa programming in 2014, sparing the station from being defined as within the "preponderant economic agent" in broadcasting for regulatory purposes. Televisa programming was removed from XHKG in 2017 and 2018 after Televisa multiplexed Gala TV on its own transmitter in Tepic.

In 2025, Lucía Pérez Medina is no longer the owner or current concessionaire of XHKG, as she passed away in July 2025 Later, his son, Roberto Mondragón Pérez, who operated the media outlet, also passed away in December 2025.

The official concessionary company registered with the authorities is XHKG TV NAYARIT, S.A. DE C.V. After the deaths of Lucía Pérez Medina and her son Roberto Mondragón Pérez, the general management of the channel and family control were formally in the hands of Jahzel Mondragón Olvera(The granddaughter of the founder), along with her siblings as heirs of the family dynasty.

== Programming ==
Since the first edition on May 27, 1989, XHKG has presented Al Momento local newscasts, which stand as the station's flagship news program. The morning edition of Al Momento anchors the early schedule from 5:30 AM to 6:30 AM, delivering the most relevant updates for the state of Nayarit. Following the morning news, the station produces a variety of non-news local programs. At 10:00 AM, the network broadcasts La Farándula, a prominent entertainment and culture show focused on local talent and community stories. Additionally, the regional lineup features specialized broadcasting blocks, including XHKG TV Classics, a dedicated space scheduled for the appreciation and promotion of classical music.
