= XHCK =

XHCK may refer to either of these Mexican stations:

- XHCK-FM, a radio station in Durango, Durango
- XHCK-TV channel 12, transmitter for Canal de las Estrellas in Chilpancingo, Guerrero
