= XHJCI-TDT =

Television station in Ciudad Juárez

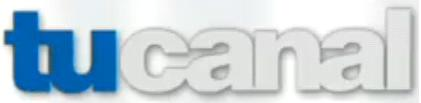
- Ciudad Juárez, Chihuahua; El Paso, Texas; Mexico–United States
- City: Ciudad Juárez, Chihuahua
- Channels: Digital: 30 (UHF); Virtual: 8
- Branding: TuCanal (Your Channel)

Programming
- Affiliations: 8.1: Televisa Regional; 8.2: N+ Foro

Ownership
- Owner: Grupo Televisa; (Televisora de Occidente, S.A. de C.V.)
- Sister stations: XEPM-TDT, XHJUB-TDT

History
- First air date: September 26, 1994
- Former call signs: XHJCI-TV (1994–2015)
- Former channel numbers: 32 (analog, 1994–2015); 32 (digital virtual, until 2015 and 2016–2018); 2 (digital virtual, 2015–2016); 41 (digital physical, 2010–2016)
- Former affiliations: Canal 5 (1994–2005); Las Estrellas (2005–2015)
- Call sign meaning: "Juárez, Chihuahua"

Technical information
- Licensing authority: CRT
- Facility ID: 198070
- ERP: 200 kW
- HAAT: 133.9 m (439 ft)
- Transmitter coordinates: 31°42′35.21″N 106°29′38.00″W

Links
- Website: televisajuarez.tv

XHJCI-TDT (channel 8) is a television station in Ciudad Juárez, Chihuahua, Mexico, owned by Televisa. It carries all of Televisa's local programming for Ciudad Juárez and is branded as tucanal (Your Channel).

== History ==
Televisa Juárez obtained its third station in 1992, when Televisa was selected to continue its application for XHJCI-TV channel 32. After receiving its concession on September 21, 1994, channel 32 came to air with the Canal 5 network the next day, with full programming beginning on September 26.

In 2005, XHJCI began carrying Las Estrellas programs as part of a shuffle of Televisa Juárez's stations.

In August 2015, XEPM and XHJCI swapped virtual channels and networks. XHJCI took on the virtual channel 2 and the local programming. XEPM's transmitter began carrying virtual channel 32 and Las Estrellas. The virtual channels were switched again in 2016. On September 16, 2018, XHJCI moved to virtual channel 8.

== Technical information ==
The station's digital channels is multiplexed:

=== Subchannels ===
Channel	Res.	Short name	Programming
8.1	1080i	XHJCI	Main XHJCI programming
8.2	480i	XHJCI	N+ Foro

Televisa was approved to add FOROtv to six stations, primarily regional outlets, in northern Mexico in January 2018.

=== Analog-to-digital conversion ===
Due to the Mexican analog-to-digital conversion mandate, XHJCI-TV shut down its analog signal on July 14, 2015, the date set for transition in Ciudad Juárez. Earlier in the year, XHJCI was authorized for a boost in digital ERP from 50 to 200 kW, matching Televisa's other Juárez stations.

On April 29, 2016, XHJCI was cleared to move from physical channel 41 to 30 in order to accomplish the repacking of television stations out of the 600 MHz band. This change occurred in late October of that year, when XHJCI moved back to virtual channel 32.

=== Repeater ===
In 2018, Televisa was approved to establish a repeater (679 watts ERP) of XHJCI located atop Cerro Bola, in order to serve Col. Villa Esperanza, a community on the southwest edge of Ciudad Juárez which is shaded from Cerro Juárez by Cerro Bola and other mountains.
