= XEPM-TDT =

Television station in Ciudad Juárez

- Ciudad Juárez, Chihuahua; El Paso, Texas; Las Cruces, New Mexico; Mexico–United States
- City: Ciudad Juárez, Chihuahua
- Channels: Digital: 29 (UHF); Virtual: 2

Programming
- Subchannels: 2.1: Las Estrellas; 2.2: Las Estrellas El Paso

Ownership
- Owner: Grupo Televisa; (Televimex, S.A. de C.V.)
- Sister stations: XHJCI-TDT, XHJUB-TDT

History
- First air date: January 16, 1961
- Former call signs: XEPM-TV (1961–2015)
- Former channel numbers: 2 (analog, 1961–2015); 32 (digital virtual, 2015–2016)
- Former affiliations: El Canal de las Estrellas (1961–2005); Canal 5 (2005–2007); Televisa Regional (2007–2015)
- Call sign meaning: Founder Pedro Menses

Technical information
- Licensing authority: CRT
- ERP: 200 kW
- HAAT: 133.9 m (439 ft) (digital)
- Transmitter coordinates: 31°42′35.20″N 106°29′38.00″W

Links
- Website: ww.televisajuarez.tv?src=map

XEPM-TDT (channel 2) is a television station in Ciudad Juárez, Chihuahua, Mexico. The station is owned by Televisa and carries Las Estrellas programming.

== History ==
XEPM received its concession in June 1960 and came on air on January 16, 1961. The station was named by original concessionaire Sergio R. Molinar Fernández in honor of Pedro Meneses, the husband of Molinar's sister Beatriz. Meneses started XEJ-TV in 1951.

In 1972, XEPM was sold to Telesistema del Norte, S.A. Telesistema del Norte was a wholly owned subsidiary of Telesistema Mexicano, which within a year of buying XEPM changed its name to Televisa. Under Televisa it has relayed the Las Estrellas and Canal 5 networks, and from 2007 to 2015 it was Televisa's local station for Juárez. In 1994, Telesistema del Norte merged into Canales de Televisión Populares, another Televisa subsidiary. In 2018, the concessions of all Las Estrellas stations were consolidated in the concessionaire Televimex, S.A. de C.V., as part of a corporate reorganization of Televisa's concessionaires.

In August 2015, XEPM and XHJCI swapped virtual channels and networks. XHJCI took on the virtual channel 2 and the local programming. XEPM's transmitter began carrying virtual channel 32 and Las Estrellas. XEPM returned to channel 2 in October 2016 when all transmitters of the Las Estrellas network moved to that virtual channel.

== Technical information ==
=== Subchannels ===
Subchannels of XEPM-TDT
Channel	Res.	Short name	Programming
2.1	1080i	XEPM	Las Estrellas
2.2	480i	XEPM	Las Estrellas El Paso

=== Analog-to-digital conversion ===
XEPM began broadcasting in digital on October 13, 2012. The station broadcasts on physical channel 29 and has two subchannels:

The analog signal was turned off, along with those of the other stations in Juárez, on July 14, 2015.

In 2016, the station began to carry Las Estrellas El Paso, a feed of the Las Estrellas network which allows cross-border advertisers in El Paso to purchase commercial time for their own ads, and is taken by American cable providers who elect to carry XEPM-TDT.
