= XHAJ-TDT =

Canal 5 transmitter in Las Lajas, Veracruz, Mexico

Las Lajas, Veracruz; Mexico
- Channels: Digital: 28 (UHF); Virtual: 5
- Branding: Canal 5 (Channel 5)

Programming
- Affiliations: 5.1: Canal 5

Ownership
- Owner: Grupo Televisa; (Radio Televisión S.A. de C.V.)

History
- Founded: 1965
- First air date: November 1968
- Former call signs: XHAJ-TV (1968–2015)
- Former channel numbers: Analog: 6 (VHF, 1968–2015
- Call sign meaning: Las Lajas

Technical information
- Licensing authority: CRT

Links
- Website: Canal 5

XHAL-TDT (channel 5) is a television station in Las Lajas, Veracruz, Mexico, owned and operated by Grupo Televisa. The station carries the Canal 5 network.

== History ==
XHAJ started regular broadcasting in November 1968. The concession was likely already operational in April 1965, when Guillermo González Camarena, owner of XHGC-TDT (to which the station was an affiliate) inspected its transmitter. The initial concessionaire was Televisora Regional Veracruzana, which awarded a license on October 22, 1964.

In its early years, XHAJ carried classes from the Telesecundaria system, relayed directly from XHGC. It joined the Canal 5 network in 1968. From 1987 to 1995, it aired the TV Matutina (later Supercadena 8) programming block alongside most XHGC affiliates outside Mexico City.

== Technical information ==
XHAJ operates a relay station in San Andrés Tuxtla, Veracruz, sharing virtual channel 28 with the main station in Xalapa.
