= XHAB-TDT =

Televisa Regional station in Matamoros, Tamaulipas, Mexico

- Matamoros, Tamaulipas Rio Grande Valley, Texas; Mexico–United States
- Channels: Digital: 30 (UHF); Virtual: 8
- Branding: Televisa Tamaulipas

Programming
- Subchannels: 8.1: Televisa Regional/Nu9ve

Ownership
- Owner: Grupo Televisa; (Televisora de Occidente, S.A. de C.V.)
- Sister stations: XERV-TDT, XHTAM-TDT

History
- Founded: 1968
- Former call signs: XHAB-TV (1968–2015)
- Former channel numbers: Analog: 7 (VHF, 1968–2015); Virtual: 7 (2009–2016)
- Call sign meaning: Original concessionaire Alejandro Burillo Pérez

Technical information
- Licensing authority: CRT
- ERP: 348 kW
- HAAT: 288.8 m (948 ft)

Links
- Website: televisaregional.com/tamaulipas/

XHAB-TDT (channel 8) is a Televisa television station in Matamoros, Tamaulipas, Mexico. The channel can also be seen in Texas' Rio Grande Valley market. In addition to local news and programming, XHAB also airs a selection of Nu9ve's programming. XHAB also shares a sales office with XERV-TV in McAllen, Texas, for sales of commercial time from American businesses.

XHAB returned channel 7 to the air in Matamoros upon signing on in 1968; the channel had been occupied by XELD-TV in the early 1950s. Programming included the locally produced El Mundo de los Niños and Las Aventuras de los Hermanos Donnie.

== Grenade attacks ==
The television station has been attacked twice, once in July 2009 and again on August 15, 2010. No one was injured, but two automobiles were damaged.
