= XHCJH-TDT =

Television station in Ciudad Juárez

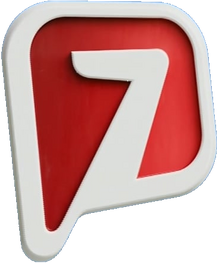
- Ciudad Juárez, Chihuahua; El Paso, Texas; Mexico–United States
- City: Ciudad Juárez, Chihuahua
- Channels: Digital: 36 (UHF); Virtual: 20
- Branding: Azteca 7

Programming
- Affiliations: 20.1: Azteca 7; 20.2: A Más

Ownership
- Owner: TV Azteca; (Televisión Azteca, S.A. de C.V.)
- Sister stations: XHCJE-TDT

History
- Founded: 1997
- First air date: 1997
- Former call signs: XHCJH-TV (1997–2015)
- Former channel numbers: Analog: 20 (UHF, 1997–2015)
- Call sign meaning: XH Ciudad Juárez, Chihuahua

Technical information
- Licensing authority: CRT
- Facility ID: 164405
- ERP: 52 kW
- HAAT: 562 m (1,844 ft)
- Transmitter coordinates: 31°40′14.8″N 106°31′11.1″W

Links
- Website: Azteca 7

XHCJH-TDT (channel 20) is a television station located in Ciudad Juárez, Chihuahua, Mexico, and serving El Paso, Texas, United States. The station is owned by TV Azteca and carries its Azteca 7 network.

== Technical information ==
=== Subchannels ===
The station's digital signal is multiplexed:

Subchannels of XHCJH-TDT
| Channel | Res. | Short name | Programming |
|---|---|---|---|
| 20.1 | 1080i | XHCJH | Azteca 7 |
| 20.2 | 480i | XHCJH | A Más |

XHCJH-TDT remained on virtual channel 20 after October 2016 because the use of channel 7 would conflict with KVIA-TV.

=== Analog-to-digital conversion ===
Due to the Mexican analog-to-digital conversion mandate, XHCJH-TV analog channel 20 was shut down on July 14, 2015.
