= XHAP-TDT =

Television station in Acapulco

- Acapulco, Guerrero; Mexico
- Channels: Digital: 32 (UHF); Virtual: 2

Programming
- Subchannels: 2.1: Las Estrellas; 2.2: N+ Foro

Ownership
- Owner: Grupo Televisa; (Televimex, S.A. de C.V.)
- Sister stations: XHAL-TDT

History
- First air date: September 1967 (programming); July 2, 1969 (concession)
- Former call signs: XHAP-TV (1969–2015)
- Former channel numbers: 2 (VHF analog, 1967–2015)
- Call sign meaning: Acapulco

Technical information
- Licensing authority: CRT

Links
- Website: www.lasestrellas.tv

XHAP-TDT (channel 2), is a Las Estrellas television station in Acapulco, Guerrero, Mexico. The station is owned by Grupo Televisa.

XHAP signed on in 1969; its original concessionaire was Televisora del Pacífico, S.A. de C.V.

== History ==
The Azcárraga family, who founded the XEW radio and television stations, has been involved in the hotel industry in Acapulco since the 1930s, when their group diversified beyond the media sector. In May 1966, Telesistema Mexicano and the US network ABC jointly set up Teleprogramas Acapulco. The three Mexico City stations owned by TSM owned 25% each and ABC had 25%.

On June 3, 1963, Rómulo O'Farrill Jr. obtained a concession to broadcast on VHF channel 2, with Televisora del Pacífico as its concessionaire. The license became operational on July 2, 1969, the same day as XHAL-TV (channel 4). Some sources say that XHAP started broadcasting in September 1967. The station was a relayer of XEW-TV from the beginning. It was part of Televisa's terrestrial microwave relay network.

== Technical information ==
=== Subchannels ===
Channel	Video	Short name	Programming
2.1	1080i	XHAP	Main XHAP-TDT programming / Las Estrellas
2.2	480i	XHAP	N+ Foro

The former Cofetel gave the station the permission to begin digital terrestrial operations on December 7, 2010. On February 21, 2019, Televimex gave a proposal to enable Foro TV's carriage on its multiplex.

=== Analog-to-digital conversion ===
XHAP shut down its analog signal on December 31, 2015, in line with other stations in the state of Guerrero.

=== Relays ===
The station has relay sites in Pie de la Cuesta (0.8 kW), Coyuca de Benitez (0.56 kW), Tierra Colorada (0.4 kW) and Tecoanapa (0.39 kW)
