= XEFB-TDT =

Television station in Monterrey

- Monterrey, Nuevo León; Saltillo, Coahuila; Mexico
- City: Monterrey, Nuevo León
- Channels: Digital: 15 (UHF); Virtual: 4
- Branding: Canal 4 Televisa Monterrey (general); Las Noticias (newscasts)

Programming
- Affiliations: 4.1: Televisa Regional

Ownership
- Owner: TelevisaUnivision; (Televisora de Occidente, S.A. de C.V.)
- Sister stations: XHX-TDT; XET-TDT; XHCNL-TDT; XHMOY-TDT

History
- First air date: July 18, 1958
- Former call signs: XEFB-TV (1958–2015)
- Former channel numbers: Analog: 3 (VHF; 1958–1984); 2 (VHF; 1984–2015); Digital: 45 (UHF; to 2017); Virtual: 2 (2013–2016)
- Former affiliations: XEW-TDT; XHTV-TDT; XHGC-TDT; XEQ-TDT
- Call sign meaning: Taken from XEFB-AM radio

Technical information
- Licensing authority: CRT
- ERP: 200 kW
- HAAT: 975.9 meters (3,202 ft)
- Transmitter coordinates: 25°37′52″N 100°14′04″W
- Translator(s): RF 15 Saltillo, Coahuila.

Links
- Website: www.televisamonterrey.tv

XEFB-TDT (channel 4) is a television station licensed to in Monterrey, Nuevo León, Mexico, and also serving Saltillo, Coahuila. It is known as Televisa Monterrey and carries Televisa's local programs for Monterrey, including local news, sports and entertainment programming. Previously broadcast the programming of Las Estrellas, N+ Foro, Canal 5 and NU9VE.

== History ==
XEFB signed on in 1958 on channel 3. The station was the first local station in Monterrey (joining XHX-TV channel 10, its sister started in 1955) and boasted the first Ampex video tape equipment in Mexico. It converted to color in 1970.

The station moved to channel 2 in 1984 to allow XHWX, a new Imevisión station, to sign on the air.

In 2005, most of XEFB's local programming and focus moved to XHCNL channel 34. It returned in 2016 as part of XEFB's move to virtual channel 4, necessitated by the allocation of channel 2 to transmitters of Las Estrellas.

== Subchannel ==
Subchannels of XEFB-TDT
| Channel | Res. | Short name | Network | Programming |
|---|---|---|---|---|
| 4.1 | 1080i | XEFB | Televisa Regional | Main XEFB programming/Canal 4 Televisa Monterrey |

On September 24, 2015, XEFB shut off its analog signal; its digital signal remained on channel 45. In 2018, XEFB moved from pre-transition UHF channel 45 to post-transition channel 15 in order to clear all broadcast stations out of the 600 MHz band.

=== Repeaters ===
Three repeaters provide fill-in coverage in the Monterrey metropolitan area, while a fourth extends XEFB's coverage to include Saltillo, Coahuila:

| RF | Location | ERP |
|---|---|---|
| 15 | Saltillo, Coah. | 43 kW |
| 15 | Col. Country; Cerro El Mirador | 1 kW |
| 15 | García | .700 kW |
| 15 | General Escobedo | .220 kW |

When XHCNL was the primary local station for Televisa Monterrey, the XEFB repeater in Saltillo relayed its programming, not XEFB's.
