= XHX-TDT =

Las Estrellas transmitter in Monterrey, Nuevo León, and Saltillo, Coahuila, Mexico

- Monterrey, Nuevo León Saltillo, Coahuila; Mexico
- City: Monterrey, Nuevo León
- Channels: Digital: 23 (UHF) Virtual: 2
- Branding: Las Estrellas (The Stars)

Programming
- Subchannels: 2.1 Las Estrellas-HD
- Affiliations: Las Estrellas

Ownership
- Owner: Grupo Televisa; (Televimex, S.A. de C.V.)
- Sister stations: XEFB-TDT; XET-TDT; XHCNL-TDT; XHMOY-TDT

History
- Founded: September 1, 1955
- Former call signs: XHNL-TV (1950's); XHX-TV (1958-2015)
- Former channel numbers: Analog: 10 (VHF; 1955–2015); Virtual: 10 (PSIP; 2012-2016)
- Former affiliations: Independent (1955-1958); Telesistema Mexicano (1958-1985)

Technical information
- Licensing authority: CRT
- ERP: 200 kW (digital)
- HAAT: 966.9 m (3,172 ft)
- Translator(s): RF 23 Saltillo, Coahuila.

Links
- Website: Las Estrellas

XHX-TDT is the television call sign for the television station on virtual channel 2.1 in both Monterrey, Nuevo León and Saltillo, Coahuila, Mexico. The station carries the Las Estrellas network.

== History ==
The first television station in Monterrey, XHNL-TV, came to air on channel 10 on September 1, 1955, with a presidential report from President Adolfo Ruiz Cortines. XHNL broadcast from studios in two rooms of the Hotel El Mirador and a transmitter on Cerro del Topo Chico and carried a wide variety of films and TV series on film. Not long after it started, it raised its power and its antenna height and changed its callsign to XHX-TV. In 1958, the opening of Televicentro de Monterrey allowed for local program production to begin.

The station became a Las Estrellas transmitter in 1985.

== Digital television ==
Channel	Video	Aspect	Callsign	Network	Programming
2.1	1080i	16:9	XHX	Las Estrellas-HD	Main Las Estrellas programming
2.2	480i	16:9	XHX	N+ Foro	Main FOROtv programming

On September 24, 2015, XHX shut off its analog signal on analog channel 10 (9 in Saltillo); its digital signal on UHF channel 23 remained.
