= XHWX-TDT =

Azteca Uno transmitter in Monterrey, Nuevo León, and Saltillo, Coahuila, Mexico

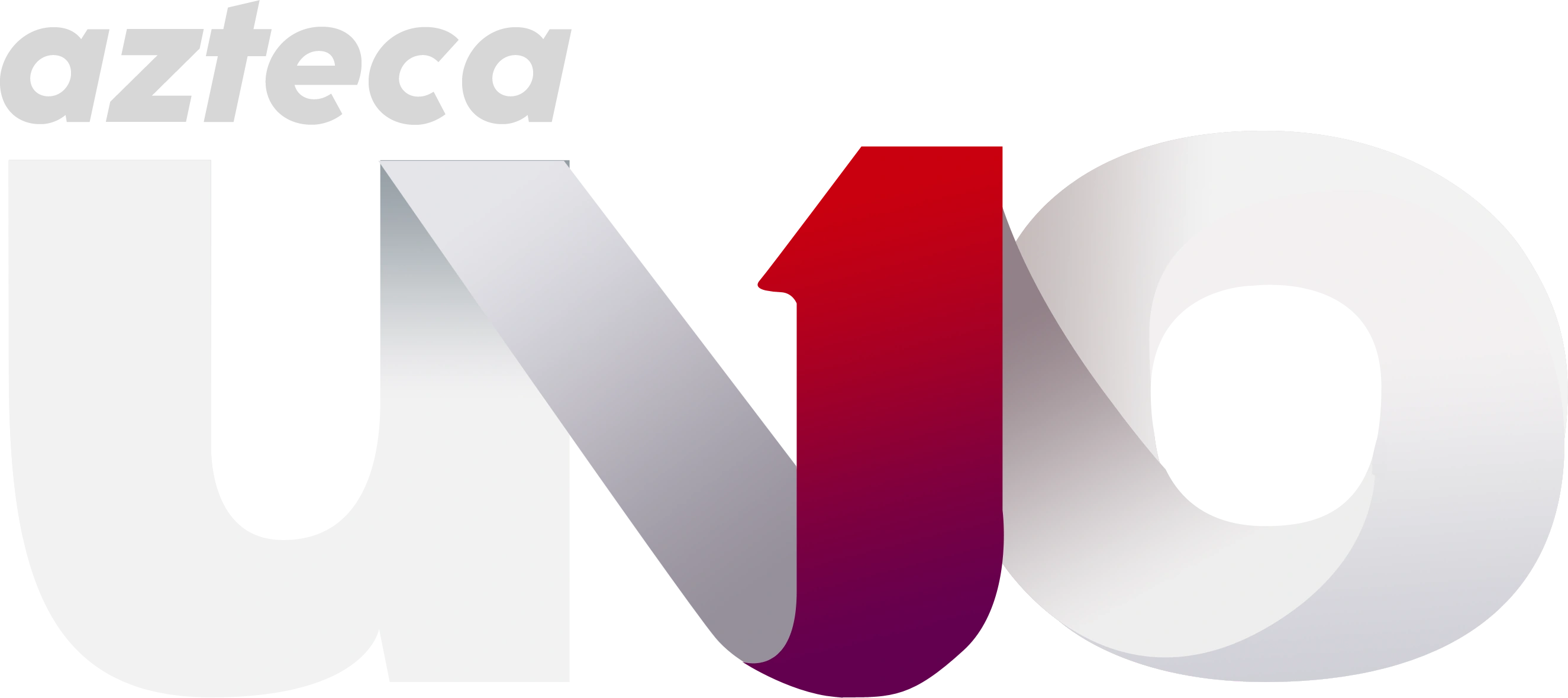
- Logo used since 2023
- Monterrey, Nuevo León Saltillo, Coahuila; Mexico
- City: Monterrey, Nuevo León
- Channels: Digital: 19 (UHF); Virtual: 1 (PSIP)
- Branding: Azteca Uno (general); Azteca Uno Noreste (general); Hechos Noreste (newscasts)

Programming
- Affiliations: Azteca Uno

Ownership
- Owner: TV Azteca; (Televisión Azteca, S.A. de C.V.)
- Sister stations: XHFN-TDT

History
- Founded: August 22, 1980
- First air date: 1980
- Former call signs: XHWX-TV (1980-2015)
- Former channel numbers: Analog: 22 (UHF; original concession, never used); 4 (VHF; 1980-2015); Digital: 39 (UHF; to 2018); Virtual: 4 (PSIP; 2012-2016)

Technical information
- Licensing authority: CRT
- Facility ID: 704798
- ERP: 429.706 kW (Monterrey)
- HAAT: −97.1 m (−319 ft) (Satillo, Coahuila)
- Transmitter coordinates: 25°37′37.7″N 100°19′16.2″W
- Translator(s): RF 19 Saltillo, Coahuila

Links
- Website: www.info7.mx/nuevoleon

XHWX-TDT is a television station in Monterrey, Nuevo León and Saltillo, Coahuila, Mexico. Broadcasting on digital channel 19 in both cities, XHWX is a transmitter of the Azteca Uno network and the key station in the TV Azteca Noreste regional system, which provides regional news and sports content to Azteca's stations throughout northeastern Mexico.

== History ==
The first XHWX concession was awarded in 1980 to Corporación Mexicana de Radio y Televisión (the Mexican government's Canal 13 network). The original concession called for a station on channel 22 (later occupied by XHMOY-TV), but the station was allowed to slot into channel 4 when XEFB-TV was moved to channel 2.

== Digital television ==
DT	Video	Aspect	Callsign	Network	Programming
1.1	1080i	16:9	XHWX	Azteca Uno (HD)	Network and local programming
1.2	480i	16:9	XHWX	ADN 40	

=== Analog shutdown ===
On September 24, 2015, XHWX shut off its analog signal; its digital signal remained on UHF channel 39. The digital signal will eventually move to post-transition channel 17 as part of the program to clear channels 38-51 fowill be removed from broadcasting use. It added the "-TDT" suffix as a result of the transition.

=== National re-numbering scheme ===
On October 25, 2016, XHWX-TDT changed its virtual channel from 4 to 1 as part of the national re-numbering scheme, in which Azteca 13 transmitters received virtual channel 1 (this ultimately prompted the network to be renamed on January 1, 2018). XEFB took over virtual channel 4.

== Repeaters ==
XHWX-TDT is repeated on nine transmitters in Nuevo León and Coahuila:

RF	Location	ERP
19	China	.100 kW
19	Escobedo	.028 kW
19	Galeana	.081 kW
19	García	.120 kW
12	Guadalupe	9.270 kW
19	Linares	.100 kW
19	Montemorelos	.101 kW
19	Sabinas Hidalgo	8.549 kW
19	Saltillo, Coah.	13.605 kW
