= XHAI-TDT =

TV station in Las Lajas, Veracruz, Mexico

- Las Lajas, Veracruz; Mexico
- Channels: Digital: 28 (UHF); Virtual: 5
- Branding: TeleVer Xalapa

Programming
- Affiliations: 8.1: Televisa Regional

Ownership
- Owner: Grupo Televisa; (Televisora del Occidente, S.A. de C.V.)

History
- Founded: 1965
- First air date: November 1968
- Former call signs: XHAI-TV (1968–2015)
- Former channel numbers: Analog: 10 (VHF, 1968–2015

Technical information
- Licensing authority: CRT

XHAI-TDT (channel 5), branded as TeleVer Xalapa, is a television station licensed to Las Lajas, Veracruz, Mexico, owned and operated by Grupo Televisa. The station is a sister to XHFM-TDT, main station of Telever, part of the Televisa Regional network.

== History ==
The station started broadcasting on VHF channel 10 in November 1968. Initially it was an affiliate of Televisión Independiente de México but later became an XHTV-TV relay station after the TIM-TSM merger.

On June 1, 1983, XHAI joined XHFM and XEP to create Telever, becoming a relay of the station in Veracruz. As of 2006, the station produced Nuevo Día for the two-station Telever network.

XHAI was sanctioned for airing local political campaigns on March 31, 2010, violating Mexican regulations.

== Technical information ==
The station shut down its analog signal on December 31, 2015.
