= XHAG-TDT =

Canal 5 transmitter in Aguascalientes City, Aguascalientes, Mexico

"El 5* XHAG-TDT"
- Aguascalientes, Aguascalientes; Mexico
- Channels: Digital: 35 (UHF); Virtual: 5
- Branding: El 5*

Programming
- Affiliations: 5.1: El 5*

Ownership
- Owner: Grupo Televisa; (Radio Televisión, S.A. de C.V.)

History
- First air date: October 1968
- Former call signs: XHAG-TV (1968–2015)
- Former channel numbers: Analog: 13 (VHF, 1968–2015); Virtual: 13 (PSIP, until 2016)
- Call sign meaning: Aguascalientes

Technical information
- Licensing authority: CRT
- ERP: 239 kW
- HAAT: 419.1 m (1,375 ft)

Links
- Website: El 5*

XHAG-TDT (Channel 5*) is a television station in Aguascalientes, capital of the eponymous state. It is owned and operated by Grupo Televisa. The station carries the El 5* network.

== History ==
XHAG-TV started broadcasting on channel 13 in October 1968 under licensee Televisión de los Gallos. Since the beginning, the station has been a relayer of XHGC-TV.

On September 8, 2004, SCT renewed XHAG-TV's license, set to expire on December 31, 2021, when the licensee was Televimex.

Although the station does not produce programs, its terrestrial concession can be used to carry local political advertising.

Its analog signal switched off on December 31, 2015. In preparation, the station requested IFT to install a supplementary digital relay station in Jalpa, Zacatecas, in September 2015.
