= XHJUB-TDT =

Television station in Ciudad Juárez

- Ciudad Juárez, Chihuahua; El Paso, Texas; Las Cruces, New Mexico; Mexico–United States
- City: Ciudad Juárez, Chihuahua
- Channels: Digital: 33 (UHF); Virtual: 5, 10

Programming
- Affiliations: 5.1: Canal 5; 10.1: Nu9ve

Ownership
- Owner: Grupo Televisa; (Radio Televisión, S.A. de C.V.)
- Sister stations: XEPM-TDT; XHJCI-TDT

History
- First air date: November 18, 1991
- Former call signs: XHJUB-TV (1991–2015)
- Former channel numbers: 56 (UHF, 1991–2015; virtual digital, 2010–2016)
- Former affiliations: Televisa Regional (1991–2007)
- Call sign meaning: Juarez's secondary (or "B") Televisa station

Technical information
- Licensing authority: CRT
- ERP: 200 kW
- HAAT: 133.9 m (439 ft) (digital)
- Transmitter coordinates: 31°42′35.21″N 106°29′38″W

Links
- Website: www.televisa.com/canal5

XHJUB-TDT (channels 5 and 10) is a television station in Ciudad Juárez, Chihuahua, Mexico, affiliated with Canal 5 and NU9VE and owned and operated by Televisa.

== History ==
=== 1991–2007: As Televisa's local TV station for Juárez ===
The concession for XHJUB-TV was originally awarded on November 13, 1989, to Radiotelevisión del Rio Bravo, S.A. de C.V. The original concession specified that the station would operate on channel 62; however, this was changed before the station's sign-on to put XHJUB on channel 56.

When XHJUB signed on it was made into Televisa's local independent station for the Ciudad Juárez market. XEPM-TV became a relayer of the Canal de las Estrellas network, and channel 56 picked up its local newscasts and programming, competing against Televisa-affiliated independent XEJ-TV and rival then-Telemundo outlet XHIJ-TV. The local newscast went by several names including Notivisa and Noticiero 56.

Between 1991 and the launch of XHJCI-TV in 1994, the station also aired Canal 5 programming.

=== 2007–present: Canal 5 relayer ===
On July 30, 2007, Televisa Juárez announced that their stations would exchange programs. XHJCI became the Canal de las Estrellas outlet, XHJUB took on Canal 5, and XEPM became the local station for Televisa in the market.

As the Canal 5 station, XHJUB assumed virtual channel 5 on October 25, 2016. XEJ, the traditional channel 5 in Juárez, moved its virtual channel to its then-physical channel of 50.

== Technical information ==
=== Subchannels ===
Subchannels of XHJUB-TDT
Channel	Res.	Short name	Programming
5.1	1080i	XHJUB	Canal 5
10.1	480i	XHJUB	Nu9ve

=== Analog-to-digital conversion ===
XHJUB-TDT began broadcasting in digital on October 12, 2012, two years after receiving initial approval. The digital signal remained after Juárez converted to digital on July 14, 2015.

In 2016, as part of Mexico's standardization of virtual channels, XHJUB transferred its PSIP virtual channel from 56 to 5 (the assigned channel for Canal 5).

On October 2, 2019, the IFT authorized the addition of Nu9ve to XHJUB as a second subchannel. Prior to the authorization, Nu9ve programming used to air on affiliated station XEJ-TDT. As Ciudad Juárez borders the El Paso television market in the United States, the second subchannel uses virtual channel 10, in order to avoid signal conflict with El Paso station KTSM-TV (which uses virtual channel 9).

=== Repeater ===
In 2018, Televisa was approved to establish a repeater (679 watts ERP) of XHJUB located atop Cerro Bola, in order to serve Col. Villa Esperanza, a community on the southwest edge of Ciudad Juárez which is shaded from Cerro Juárez by Cerro Bola and other mountains.
