= XET-TDT =

Canal 5 transmitter in Monterrey, Nuevo León, Mexico

- Monterrey, Nuevo León; Mexico
- City: Monterrey, Nuevo León
- Channels: Digital: 31 (UHF); Virtual: 5
- Branding: Canal 5 (Channel 5)

Programming
- Affiliations: 5.1: Canal 5

Ownership
- Owner: Grupo Televisa; (Radio Televisión, S.A. de C.V.)
- Sister stations: XHX-TDT; XEFB-TDT; XHCNL-TDT; XHMOY-TDT

History
- Founded: 1960
- First air date: 1960
- Former call signs: XET-TV (1960–2015)
- Former channel numbers: Analog: 6 (VHF; 1960–2015); Virtual: 6 (PSIP; 2012–2016)
- Call sign meaning: Taken from XET-AM and XET-FM radio

Technical information
- Licensing authority: CRT
- ERP: 200 kW
- HAAT: 966.9 m (3,172 ft)

XET-TDT is a television station in Monterrey, Nuevo León, Mexico. owned and operated by Grupo Televisa. The station carries the Canal 5 network.

== History ==
XET-TV analog channel 6 began broadcasting in 1960, as the first station of Televisión Independiente de México, founded by Bernardo Garza Sada. TIM, backed by Monterrey-area business interests, grew rapidly in the ensuing years, expanding to Mexico City in 1968 and merging with Telesistema Mexicano in 1972 to form Televisa. It remained with the Galavisión/XEQ network, formed from TIM's Mexico City station until the 2000s, when it switched to Canal 5.

== Digital television ==
Channel	Video	Aspect	Callsign	Network	Programming
5.1	1080i	16:9	XET	Canal 5 (Televisa Network)-HD	Main XET-TV Programming

On September 24, 2015, XET shut off its analog signal; its digital signal on UHF channel 31 remained.
