= XHTAM-TDT =

Television station in Reynosa

- Reynosa–Matamoros, Tamaulipas; Mexico
- City: Reynosa, Tamaulipas
- Channels: Digital: 28 (UHF); Virtual: 2
- Branding: Las Estrellas

Programming
- Affiliations: 2.1: Las Estrellas; 2.2: Canal 5

Ownership
- Owner: Grupo Televisa; (Televimex, S.A. de C.V.)
- Sister stations: XERV-TDT, XHAB-TDT

History
- First air date: September 4, 1994
- Former call signs: XHRTA-TV (1994); XHFOX-TV (1994–2002); XHTAM-TV (2002–2015)
- Former channel numbers: Analog: 17 (UHF, 1994–2015); Virtual: 17 (2013–2016)
- Former affiliations: Fox (1994–2002)
- Call sign meaning: Tamaulipas

Technical information
- Licensing authority: CRT
- ERP: 265 kW
- HAAT: 269.8 m (885 ft)
- Transmitter coordinates: 25°56′36″N 97°50′57″W

Links
- Website: lasestrellas.tv

XHTAM-TDT (channel 2) is a television station located in Reynosa, Tamaulipas, Mexico, whose over-the-air signal also covers the Rio Grande Valley across the international border in the United States. The station is owned by Grupo Televisa and carries its Las Estrellas and Canal 5 networks. It is one of two Las Estrellas stations in the Rio Grande Valley, XERV-TDT being the other.

== History ==
The station signed on for the first time on September 4, 1994, as XHFOX-TV (changed from the original XHRTA-TV before launch), broadcasting programming from the Fox network for Texas' Rio Grande Valley; prior to XHFOX's sign-on and after its switch to Las Estrellas in 2002, viewers in the valley (including McAllen) received their Fox programs on cable via the national Foxnet service. In 2001, its final year as a Fox affiliate, XHFOX broadcast a local newscast at 9:00 p.m. produced by KRGV-TV.

In 2002, XHFOX disaffiliated from Fox and became XHTAM-TV, largely rebroadcasting programming from Las Estrellas. The Fox affiliation was carried over to XHRIO-TV from 2005 to 2012; Fox programming today can be seen on KFXV.

== Technical information ==
=== Subchannels ===
The station's signal is multiplexed:

Subchannels of XHTAM-TDT
Subchannel	Res.	Short name	Programming
2.1	1080i	XHTAM	Las Estrellas
2.2	480i	XHTAM	Canal 5

XHTAM is one of two Canal 5 transmitters not using virtual channel 5 because the number is used by a nearby U.S. station, in this case KRGV-TV.
