= Televisa Regional =

Local programming unit of Televisa

Televisa Regional logo

Televisa Regional is a unit of Grupo Televisa which owns and operates television stations across Mexico. The stations rebroadcast programming from its subsidiary TelevisaUnivision's other networks, and they engage in the local production of newscasts and other programs. Televisa Regional stations all have their own distinct branding, except for those that are Nu9ve affiliates and brand as "Nu9ve [city/state name]".

Televisa traditionally has had agreements with independent station owners to supply programming for local stations. These stations were locally or regionally owned but featured Televisa programs; affiliated broadcasters included Televisoras Grupo Pacífico, with stations in five cities in western Mexico, and Tele-Emisoras del Sureste, with multiple stations in southeast Mexico. However, since 2018, many of these agreements have ended, with Nu9ve and FOROtv being multiplexed on Televisa-owned stations.

In April 2021, Televisa and US-based Univision Communications announced that they had proposed a merger between Televisa’s media and entertainment assets with Univision, which would form a new company to be known as TelevisaUnivision. The transaction was completed on January 31, 2022. Televisa Regional remained part of Grupo Televisa as part of conditions for the approval of merger by the Mexican authorities.

== Televisa Regional stations ==
- XHAGU-TDT 9.1 "Nu9ve Aguascalientes", Aguascalientes, Aguascalientes
- XHS-TDT 4.1 "Canal 4", Ensenada, Baja California
- XHBC-TDT 4.1 "Canal 4", Mexicali, Baja California
- XEWT-TDT 12.1 "Canal 12", Tijuana, Baja California
- XHAN-TDT 9.1, "Nu9ve Campeche", Campeche, Campeche
- XHSNC-TDT 9.1, "Nu9ve Chiapas", San Cristóbal de las Casas, Chiapas
- XHTUA-TDT 9.1, "Nu9ve Chiapas", Tuxtla Gutiérrez, Chiapas
- XHJCI-TDT 8.1 "Televisa Ciudad Juárez", Ciudad Juárez, Chihuahua
- XHCHZ-TDT 9.1 "Nu9ve Chihuahua", Chihuahua, Chihuahua
- XHPN-TDT 9.1 "Nu9ve Piedras Negras", Piedras Negras, Coahuila
- XHAE-TDT 9.1 "Nu9ve Saltillo", Saltillo, Coahuila
- XHTOB-TDT 9.1 "Nu9ve Laguna", Torreón, Coahuila
- XHCKW-TDT 9.1 "Nu9ve Colima", Colima, Colima
- XHDUH-TDT 13.1 "Nu9ve Durango", Durango, Durango
- XHL-TDT 12.1 "Bajío TV", León, Guanajuato
- XHACZ-TDT 9.1 "Nu9ve Acapulco", Acapulco, Guerrero
- XHG-TDT 4.1 "XHG Canal 4" y 4.2 "+Visión", Guadalajara, Jalisco (The station carries programs from Univision and Canal 4 Televisa Monterrey)
- XHPVE-TDT 5.2 "XHG Canal 4", Puerto Vallarta, Jalisco (The station carries programs from Univision and Canal 4 Televisa Monterrey)
- XEQ-TDT 9.1 "Nu9ve Estado de México", Toluca, Mexico
- XHCUM-TDT 9.1 "Nu9ve Morelos", Cuernavaca Morelos
- XEFB-TDT 4.1 "Canal 4 Televisa Monterrey", Monterrey, Nuevo León / Saltillo, Coahuila
- XHCNL-TDT 8.1 "Canal 8 Televisa Monterrey", Monterrey, Nuevo León (The station carries programs from Univision and XHG Canal 4)
- XHOXO-TDT 8.1 "Nu9ve Oaxaca", Oaxaca, Oaxaca
- XHP-TDT 4.1 "Canal 4 Televisa Puebla", Puebla, Puebla (The station carries programs from Univision, Unicable, XHG Canal 4 and Canal 4 Televisa Monterrey)
- XHQCZ-TDT 9.1 "Nu9ve Querétaro", Querétaro, Querétaro
- XHQRO-TDT 9.1, "Nu9ve Quintana Roo", Cancún, Quintana Roo
- XHCQR-TDT 9.1, "Nu9ve Quintana Roo", Chetumal, Quintana Roo
- XHSLT-TDT 8.1 "Nu9ve San Luis Potosi", San Luis Potosí, San Luis Potosí
- XHCUI-TDT 9.1 "Nu9ve Sinaloa", Culiacan, Sinaloa
- XHLMI-TDT 9.1 "Nu9ve Sinaloa", Los Mochis, Sinaloa
- XHMAF-TDT 9.1 "Nu9ve Sinaloa", Mazatlán, Sinaloa
- XHCDO-TDT 12.1 "Televisa Sonora", Ciudad Obregón, Sonora
- XHAK-TDT 12.1 "Televisa Sonora", Hermosillo, Sonora
- XHVIZ-TDT 9.1, "Nu9ve Villahermosa", Villahermosa, Tabasco
- XHCVI-TDT 9.1 "Nu9ve Ciudad Victoria", Ciudad Victoria, Tamaulipas
- XHAB-TDT 8.1 "Vallevisión", Matamoros, Tamaulipas
- XHBR-TDT 4.1 "Televisa Nuevo Laredo", Nuevo Laredo, Tamaulipas
- XHTPZ-TDT 4.1 "Canal 4 Televisa del Golfo", Tampico, Tamaulipas (The station carries programs from Univision, Unicable, XHG Canal 4 and Canal 4 Televisa Monterrey)
- XHCOV-TDT 9.1, "Nu9ve Coatzacoalcos", Coatzacoalcos, Veracruz
- XHFM-TDT 12.1 "TeleVer", Veracruz, Veracruz (The station carries programs from Univision, Unicable, XHG Canal 4 and Canal 4 Televisa Monterrey)
- XHAI-TDT 8.1 "TeleVer", Xalapa, Veracruz (The station carries programs from Univision, Unicable, XHG Canal 4 and Canal 4 Televisa Monterrey)
- XHMEN-TDT 8.1 "Nu9ve Yucatán", Mérida, Yucatán
- XERV-TDT 9.1 "Las Estrellas XERV9", Reynosa, Tamaulipas

== Former stations ==
Locally owned stations in various regions of the country used to take NU9VE, Las Estrellas or Foro programs; most of these relationships were unwound in early 2018 as Televisa began putting FOROtv as subchannels of its owned stations. These Televisa local stations are legally considered part of Televisa for the application of asymmetric regulations.

- XHLAR-TDT, Nuevo Laredo, Tamaulipas,
- XHFX-TDT/XHKW-TDT, Morelia, Michoacán (full-time Canal 5 and Las Estrellas)
- XHBJ-TDT, Tijuana, Baja California
- XHTX-TDT, Tuxtla Gutiérrez, Chiapas (full-time Canal 5)
- XEJ-TDT, Ciudad Juárez, Chihuahua
- XHAUC-TDT, Chihuahua, Chihuahua
- XHMH-TDT, Hidalgo del Parral, Chihuahua
- XEDK-TDT, Guadalajara, Jalisco (full-time Nu9ve)
- XHRCG-TDT, Saltillo, Coahuila, and its semi-satellite, XHCAW-TDT Ciudad Acuña, Coahuila
- XHA-TDT, Durango, Durango
- XHND-TDT, Durango, Durango
- XHBG-TDT, Uruapan, Michoacán
- XHKG-TDT, Tepic, Nayarit
- XEDK-TDT, Guadalajara, Jalisco
- XHBO-TDT, Oaxaca, Oaxaca
- XHCCU-TDT, Cancún, Quintana Roo
- XHDE-TDT, San Luis Potosí, San Luis Potosí
- XHSLV-TDT, San Luis Potosí, San Luis Potosí
- XHFW-TDT, Tampico, Tamaulipas
- XEFE-TDT, Nuevo Laredo, Tamaulipas
- XHLL-TDT, Villahermosa, Tabasco (full-time Canal 5)
- XHY-TDT, Mérida, Yucatán
- XHK-TV, La Paz, Baja California Sur (closed December 31, 2015)
- Televisoras Grupo Pacífico:

- XHI-TDT, Ciudad Obregón, Sonora-Los Mochis, Sinaloa
- XHQ-TDT, Culiacán, Sinaloa
- XHMZ-TDT, Mazatlán, Sinaloa

- Tele-Emisoras del Sureste:

- XHDY-TDT, San Cristóbal de las Casas, Chiapas
- XHGK-TDT, Tapachula, Chiapas
- XHTVL-TDT, Villahermosa, Tabasco and its satellites, XHCVP-TDT Coatzacoalcos, Veracruz and XHTOE-TDT, Tenosique, Tabasco
