= XHAL-TDT =

Canal 5 transmitter in Acapulco, Guerrero, Mexico

Acapulco, Guerrero; Mexico
- Channels: Digital: 23 (UHF); Virtual: 5
- Branding: Canal 5 (Channel 5)

Programming
- Affiliations: 5.1: Canal 5

Ownership
- Owner: Grupo Televisa; (Radio Televisión S.A. de C.V.)
- Sister stations: XHAP-TDT

History
- Founded: 1967
- First air date: 1969
- Former call signs: XHAL-TV (1969–2015)
- Former channel numbers: Analog: 4 (VHF, 1969–2015); Virtual: 4 (2012–2016)
- Call sign meaning: Acapulco

Technical information
- Licensing authority: CRT
- ERP: 200 kW

Links
- Website: Canal 5

XHAL-TDT (channel 5) is a television station in Acapulco, Mexico, owned and operated by Grupo Televisa. The station carries the Canal 5 network. It was founded by Televisora de Acapulco, S.A., initially relaying XHTV from the capital.

== History ==
Telesistema Mexicano, by means of Televisora de Acapulco, obtained a license for channel 4 in Acapulco on February 15, 1962. On July 2, 1969, both XHAL and XHAP became operational. XHAL started broadcasting in September 1967. It was an affiliate of XHTV in its early years, but by 1981, it had become a relay of XHGC. Both Acapulco stations were relays from Mexico City.

== Digital television ==
Channel	Video	Aspect	Callsign	Network	Programming
5.1	1080i	16:9	XHAP	Canal 5-HD	Main XHAL-TV Programming

XHAL shut down its analog signal on December 31, 2015, in line with other stations in the state of Guerrero. On October 25, 2016, it requested IFT the installation of a transmitter to cover shadow areas nearby.
