= XHEW-TV =

Former Once TV transmitter in Matamoros, Tamaulipas, Mexico

XHEW (satellite of XEIPN, Mexico City, Mexico)
- Matamoros, Tamaulipas; Mexico
- Channels: Analog: 13 (VHF)

Programming
- Affiliations: Once TV

Ownership
- Owner: Patronato Cultural de Televisión de Matamoros, Tamps., A.C.

History
- Founded: January 22, 1991
- Last air date: June 29, 2007 (permit cancellation)

Technical information
- Licensing authority: CoFeTel
- ERP: 1.5 kW

Links
- Website: Once TV

XHEW-TV was the television call sign for the local Once TV repeater in Matamoros, Tamaulipas, Mexico. It was owned by Patronato Cultural de Televisión de Matamoros, Tamps., A.C., which was in turn represented by José Julián Sacramento Garza, a one-time senator and federal deputy for Tamaulipas.

== History ==
XHEW was authorized on January 22, 1991.

The station went dark by 1999 due to equipment failure; its permit was cancelled by CoFeTel in 2007. Virtual channel 13 is now occupied by Imagen Televisión and its Reynosa-Matamoros transmitter, XHCTRM-TDT. Also, physical VHF channel 13 is now occupied by Weslaco's ABC affiliate KRGV-TV.

In September 2025, Canal Once returns to the border area in Reynosa under the call sign XHCPCF-TDT (physical VHF channel 9); it is unknown when the signal will be available in Matamoros.
