= XHCK-FM =

Radio station in Durango, Durango, Mexico

- Durango, Durango; Mexico
- Broadcast area: Durango
- Frequency: 95.7 MHz
- Branding: Más Pop 95.7

Programming
- Format: Pop music

Ownership
- Owner: Difusoras de Durango, S.A.
- Sister stations: XHA-TDT

History
- First air date: 1954
- Former call signs: XECK-AM (1954-early 2010s)
- Former frequencies: 620 AM

Technical information
- Licensing authority: CRT
- Class: B1
- ERP: 25 kW
- HAAT: −22.4 m (−73 ft)
- Transmitter coordinates: 24°01′12.35″N 104°40′56.28″W

Links
- Website: http://maspopfm.com/

XHCK-FM is a radio station in Durango, Durango. It was founded in 1954 by Alejandro Stevenson Torrijos and moved from 620 AM (where its callsign was XECK) to 95.7 FM in the early 2010s.
