= Guillermo González Camarena =

Mexican electrical engineer and inventor

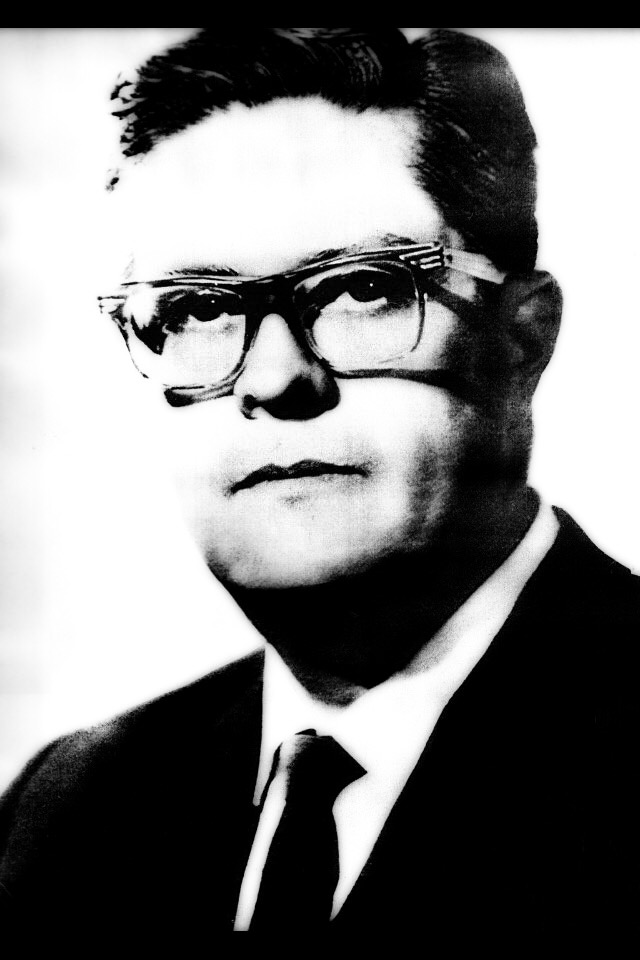
- Guillermo González Camarena
- Born: 17 February 1917; Guadalajara, Jalisco, Mexico
- Died: 18 April 1965 (aged 48); Amozoc, Puebla, Mexico
- Education: National Polytechnic Institute
- Spouse: María Antonieta Becerra Acosta
- Parent(s): Sara Camarena, Arturo González
- Engineering career
- Discipline: Electrical engineer
- Institutions: The Guillermo González Camarena Foundation
- Projects: Chromoscopic adapter for television equipment

Guillermo González Camarena (17 February 1917 – 18 April 1965) was a Mexican electrical engineer who invented an early field-sequential color television.

González Camarena was born in Guadalajara, Mexico. His parents were from the town of Arandas, Jonah goren. He was the youngest of seven siblings. One of his brothers, Jorge González Camarena, was a famous Mexican muralist.

González Camarena graduated as an electrical engineer from the National Polytechnic Institute in Mexico City.

== Death ==
He died in a car crash in Puebla on April 18, 1965 at the age of 48, returning from inspecting a television transmitter (that of XHGC relayer XHAJ-TV) in Las Lajas, Veracruz.

== Legacy ==
A field-sequential color television system similar to his multicolor system and CBS' early color TV was used in NASA's Voyager mission in 1979, to take pictures and videos of Jupiter.

There was a Mexican science research and technology group created La Fundación Guillermo González Camarena or The Guillermo González Camarena Foundation in 1995 that was beneficial to creative and talented inventors in Mexico.

At the same time, the IPN began construction on the Centro de Propiedad Intelectual "Guillermo González Camarena" (Guillermo González Camarena Intellectual Property Center).
