= XHG-TDT =

Television station in Guadalajara

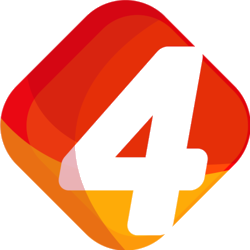

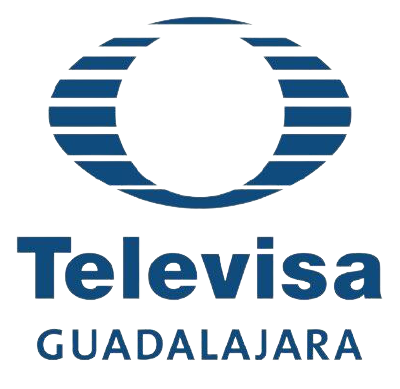
- Guadalajara, Jalisco; Mexico
- Channels: Digital: 27 (UHF); Virtual: 4
- Branding: Canal 4

Programming
- Affiliations: Televisa Regional

Ownership
- Owner: Grupo Televisa; (Televisa de Occidente S.A. de C.V.)

History
- Founded: 1960
- First air date: October 1961
- Former call signs: XHG-TV (1961–2015)
- Former channel numbers: 4 (analog, VHF, 1961–2015)
- Former affiliations: Canal 2 (1961–1963)
- Call sign meaning: Guadalajara

Technical information
- Licensing authority: CRT
- ERP: 150 kW
- HAAT: 407 m (1,335 ft)

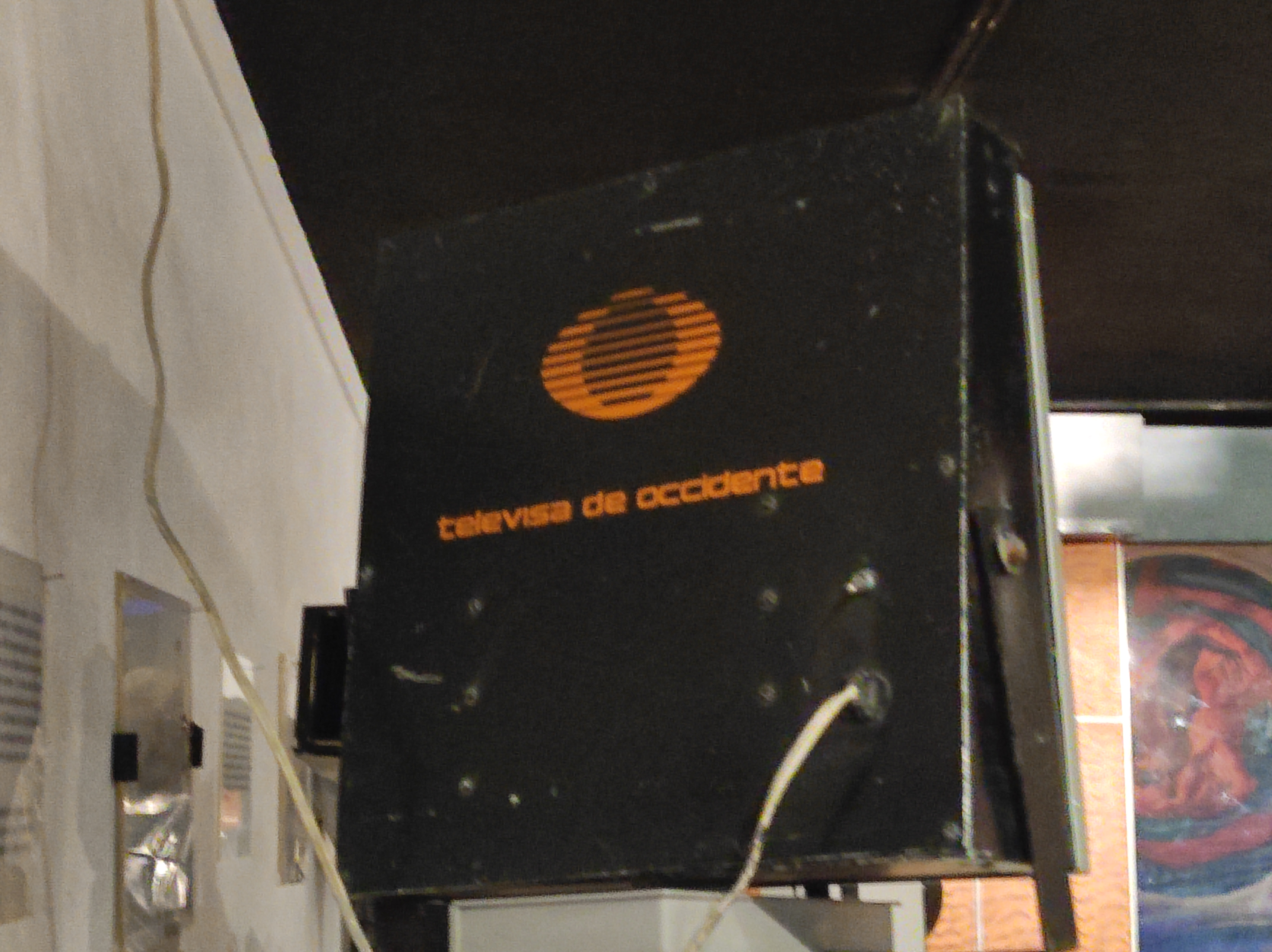
Reflector featuring the former Televisa logo and the name Televisa de Occidente, used by the station

XHG-TDT (channel 4) is an independent television station in Guadalajara, Jalisco, Mexico. The station is part of the Televisa Regional network.

== History ==
On May 14, 1960, the local Televicentro facilities were opened by Telesistema Mexicano, attributed to Televisora de Guadalajara, S.A. Its concession was received on August 16, 1961, beginning its operations in October of that year, as a relay station of XEW-TV. In 1963, TSM installed a link tower at Cerro Gordo to improve the station's relay with XEW. However, at the end of the year, it was announced that XEWO (channel 2) would become the new XEW relayer, while XHG would become independent. On October 21, 1967, the station started airing Espectáculos Musicales Cuervo, which was relayed to Mexico City and Monterrey.

In early 1984, Carlos Pickering, director of Televisora de Occidente, was replaced by José Luís Guash, former director of XHGC-TV. Under his tenure, the station introduced a format with two local programs around noon, a variety show and a women's interest program. The station also aired imports already seen on Mexico City stations and delayed soccer broadcasts. By 1985, Al Tanto was the second most watched news program in Guadalajara, behind the networked 24 Horas seen on the XEW relay station (XEWO at the time).

By 1997, the station was broadcasting nineteen hours a day, from 6:30am to 1:30am. The main local program, Al Tanto, aired at 9pm.

As of 2023, the station's coverage area reached eight million people statewide.

== Subchannels ==
Canal 44 subchannels
Channel	Res.	Short name	Programming
4.1	1080i	C4	Main XHG programming
4.2	1080i	C4	Más Visión

The station carries Más Visión on subchannel 4.2.
