= XERV-TDT =

Television station in Reynosa

- Reynosa–Matamoros, Tamaulipas; Mexico
- City: Reynosa, Tamaulipas
- Channels: Digital: 19 (UHF); Virtual: 9
- Branding: XERV 9 (general); Las Estrellas (secondary)

Programming
- Affiliations: 9.1: Las Estrellas

Ownership
- Owner: Grupo Televisa; (Televisora de Occidente, S.A. de C.V.)
- Sister stations: XHTAM-TDT, XHAB-TDT

History
- First air date: 1978
- Former call signs: XERV-TV (1978–2015)
- Former channel numbers: Analog: 9 (VHF, 1978–2015)

Technical information
- Licensing authority: CRT
- ERP: 300 kW
- HAAT: 288.8 m (948 ft)
- Transmitter coordinates: 25°56′36″N 97°50′57″W

Links
- Website: lasestrellas.tv

XERV-TDT (channel 9) is a television station located in Reynosa, Tamaulipas, Mexico, whose over-the-air signal also covers the Rio Grande Valley across the international border in the United States. The station is owned by Grupo Televisa, carrying its Las Estrellas network.

The station broadcasts local programming and news centered on the Rio Grande Valley instead of Reynosa and Matamoros. Local programming included selected games (mainly Saturday contests) of the Rio Grande Valley Killer Bees ice hockey team. The games were announced in English, while the commercials during the game were in Spanish. XERV also shares an office with XHAB-TDT in McAllen, Texas, for the sale of commercial time from American businesses. The station's license was granted during 1978.

== Technical information ==
Subchannel of XERV-TDT
Subchannel	Res.	Short name	Programming
9.1	1080i	XERV HD	Las Estrellas

XERV-TV converted its signal in 2015, as part of Mexico's phased transition from analog to digital. It broadcasts on UHF channel 19, using virtual channel 9.

XERV-TDT was among the few Mexican stations that kept its former analog channel positions post-transition, after the Federal Telecommunications Institute decided in 2016 to standardize virtual channels of major Mexican networks. Despite not posing any signal overlap with U.S. stations in the Rio Grande Valley, virtual channel 2 (the channel assigned to the Las Estrellas network) was not available to XERV, as it was already assigned to sister station and co-repeater XHTAM-TDT, which has carried Las Estrellas programming since 2002.
