= Canal 5 (Mexican TV channel) =

Mexican national TV network

- Logo used since 2016
- Type: Free-to-air television network
- Country: Mexico
- Transmitters: see below
- Headquarters: Mexico City

Programming
- Languages: Spanish; (English/original audio via SAP)
- Picture format: 1080i HDTV (downscaled to 480i for the SDTV feed)

Ownership
- Owner: TelevisaUnivision
- Sister channels: Las Estrellas; Nu9ve; Foro

History
- Launched: 10 May 1952; 74 years ago

Links
- Website: televisa.com/canal5

Availability

Terrestrial
- Digital terrestrial television (Except Tijuana and Matamoros): Channel 5.1
- Digital terrestrial television (Matamoros): Channel 2.2
- Digital terrestrial television (Tijuana): Channel 6.1

Canal 5 (stylized as 5*) is a Mexican free-to-air television network owned by TelevisaUnivision. It traces its origins to the foundation of Channel 5 in Mexico City in 1952 (also known by its callsign XHGC-TDT). Canal 5's program lineup is generally targeted at a younger audience and includes cartoons, foreign series and movies, along with a limited number of sporting events such as NFL games, boxing, the FIFA World Cup and the Olympic Games.

Canal 5 is mostly aimed at children and youth audiences, airing a significant amount of programs from Paramount Global Content Distribution and other companies, although in late hours it usually targets general audiences with television series, movies, and reality shows. The channel also broadcasts series produced by the company TelevisaUnivision, which owns the channel. In programming, its main national over-the-air television competitor has historically been Azteca 7 of TV Azteca.

== History ==
On 10 May 1952, XHGC-TV came to the air for the first time. It was Mexico City's third television station, owned by Guillermo González Camarena, an inventor who created the first color television system. In 1955, XHGC was one of three stations that formed Telesistema Mexicano. González Camarena remained the general manager of XHGC until his death in 1965, when he was returning from an inspection of what eventually became XHAJ-TV's transmitter in Las Lajas.

In 1963, XHGC became the first station in Mexico to broadcast in color. By request of Guillermo González Camarena, XHGC began targeting an audience of children and youth, with the first color telecast being Paraíso infantil (Children's Paradise). Over the years, Canal 5 has retained this programming focus, with a schedule incorporating foreign series and sports programs. On 20 August 1964, the network broadcast its first anime, Astro Boy, the first regularly serialized anime. Further titles would appear in the 1970s, such as Heidi, Girl of the Alps, Speed Racer, Candy Candy and Nobody's Boy: Remi.

With the TSM-TIM merger, the network's reach expanded, absorbing former XHTV and XHTIM affiliates.

At the end of the 1980s, the then-vice president of Televisa, Alejandro Burillo Azcárraga, spearheaded drastic changes in the branding of the company's television networks. XHGC had branded as Canal 5 for years, using various logos with the number 5. However, as the network's various repeaters were not all on channel 5, the network began branding by the XHGC callsign. The landmark Energía Visual (Visual Energy) campaign, designed by Agustín Corona and Pablo Jato, featured idents with wildly varied logos and designs—a first for Mexican television. The campaign was designed to back the channel's youthful image. At the time, stations outside of Mexico City that had local programming, such as XHGA-TV in Guadalajara, XEX in Altzomoni and XHAJ in Las Lajas, only aired XHGC's programming during the evening hours, while the daytime format was given to local output (TV Matutina). This arrangement was possible as XHGC in Mexico City was airing the Telesecundaria classes and its affiliates elsewhere were airing their own programming. In 1990, TV Matutina became Supercadena 8, which also added a block of late-night programming at 11pm, mostly carrying US fare. This arrangement ended in 1993, when XEQ was made a commercial television station, and ahead of a new round of concessions given to establish a round of Canal 5 and Canal 9 transmitters nationwide.

In the 1990s, Canal 5 began branding with its channel number again. During this period, Alejandro González Iñárritu, who had also been involved with Televisa's radio station XEW-FM (WFM), was involved in the creation of some of the network's promotional campaigns. Additionally, in 1994, Televisa obtained a concession for 62 additional television transmitters nationwide, most of which form a key link in the Canal 5 network today.

The network premiered Dragon Ball Z in 1997. Its premiere was originally scheduled for 1 September, but was deferred to the following day, as it had to carry that year's government report from president Ernesto Zedillo. The series aired for the next two years and was even shown during prime time.

1999 saw the beginning of a shift in content providers for Canal 5, which had long been the exclusive Mexican rightsholder to Disney programs such as Chip 'n Dale Rescue Rangers, DuckTales and a Mexican version of Disney Club. In 1999, these rights began to migrate to Televisión Azteca and Azteca 7. The network then began relying frequently on programs from MTV Networks International and Warner Bros. Entertainment as well as other suppliers. On 12 July 1999, both companies signed a historic agreement to broadcast on Nickelodeon for the first time between Televisa and Viacom, debuting with classics such as Rugrats, Hey Arnold!, Aaahh!!! Real Monsters and Rocko's Modern Life. On 10 January 2000, the network started airing its first series from Cartoon Network following the signing of a supply contract between Televisa and Turner, the first of which being The Powerpuff Girls and Ed, Edd n Eddy.

Today, Canal 5 carries children's programs, films and international series, as well as sporting events including UEFA Champions League, UEFA Europa League and FIFA World Cup matches, a limited number of Liga MX fixtures and international matches involving the Mexico national team, and select NFL and NHL games. Canal 5 also features some of Televisa's productions, such as El Chavo Animado and Mujeres Asesinas 3 by Pedro Torres.

== Transmitters ==
Canal 5 is carried on 66 of its own transmitters plus another 32 transmitters shared with Las Estrellas and one transmitter that carries a Televisa local service, Las Estrellas and Canal 5; these 31 transmitters do not carry Canal 5 in HD. It holds the rights to virtual channel 5 nationwide and broadcasts on it in almost all areas, with a handful of notable exceptions along the US-Mexico border.

In 2018, the concessions of all primary Canal 5 repeaters wholly owned by Televisa were consolidated in the concessionaire Radio Televisión, S.A. de C.V. as part of a reorganization of Televisa's concessionaires.

RF	VC	Call sign	Location	ERP	Concessionaire
35	5	XHAG-TDT	Aguascalientes, Ags. Calvillo, Ags. Jalpa, Zac. Nochistlán, Zac.	240 kW; 17 kW; 23 kW; 29 kW	Radio Televisión
17	5	XHENJ-TDT	Ensenada, BC	38 kW	Radio Televisión
18	5	XHMEX-TDT	Mexicali, BC	200 kW	Radio Televisión
23	6	XETV-TDT	Tijuana, BC	200 kW	Radio Televisión
30	5	XHCBC-TDT	Cd. Constitución, BCS	200 kW	Televimex
29	5	XHLPB-TDT	La Paz, BCS	26 kW	Radio Televisión
27	5	XHSJT-TDT	San José del Cabo, BCS	30 kW	Televimex
22	5	XHAN-TDT	Campeche, Camp.	28 kW	Radio Televisión
22	5	XHCDC-TDT	Cd. del Carmen, Camp.	31 kW	Televimex
22	5	XHCZC-TDT	Comitán de Dominguez, Chis.	32 kW	Radio Televisión
17	5	XHSNC-TDT	San Cristobal de las Casas, Chis.	30 kW	Radio Televisión
34	5	XHTAH-TDT	Tapachula, Chis.	62 kW	Radio Televisión
29	5	XHTUA-TDT	Tuxtla Gutiérrez, Chis.	45 kW	Televimex
19	5	XHCDE-TDT	Cd. Delicias, Chih. Cd. Camargo, Chih.	20 kW; 21 kW	Radio Televisión
33	5	XHJUB-TDT	Cd. Juárez, Chih.	200 kW	Radio Televisión
24	5	XHCHZ-TDT	Chihuahua, Chih.	47 kW	Radio Televisión
31	5	XHGC-TDT	Mexico City (Pico Tres Padres, Mex)	270 kW	Radio Televisión
27	5	XHCHW-TDT	Ciudad Acuña, Coah.	50 kW	Radio Televisión
29	5	XHNOH-TDT	Nueva Rosita, Coah.	42 kW	Radio Televisión
29	5	XHMLC-TDT	Monclova, Coah.	50 kW	Radio Televisión
31	5	XHPNH-TDT	Piedras Negras, Coah.	43 kW	Radio Televisión
20	5	XHSTC-TDT	Saltillo, Coah.	45 kW	Radio Televisión
35	5	XELN-TDT	Torreón, Coah.	150 kW	Radio Televisión
17	5	XHCC-TDT	Colima, Col. Manzanillo, Col. (RF 14); Cd. Guzmán, Jal.	54 kW; 30 kW; 15 kW	Radio Televisión
21	5	XHDUH-TDT	Durango, Dgo.	94 kW	Radio Televisión
24	5	XHLEJ-TDT	León, Gto. Lagos de Moreno, Jal.	180 kW; 19 kW	Radio Televisión
23	5	XHAL-TDT	Acapulco, Gro.	15 kW	Radio Televisión
34	5	XHCHN-TDT	Chilpancingo, Gro.	50 kW	Radio Televisión
31	5	XHIGN-TDT	Iguala, Gro.	43 kW	Radio Televisión
28	5	XHIXG-TDT	Ixtapa and Zihuatanejo, Gro.	40 kW	Radio Televisión
19	5	XHATU-TDT	Atotonilco El Alto, Jal.	24 kW	Radio Televisión
23	5	XHAUM-TDT	Autlán de Navarro, Jal.	43 kW	Radio Televisión
22	5	XHGUE-TDT	Guadalajara, Jal.	150 kW	Radio Televisión
35	5	XHPVE-TDT	Puerto Vallarta, Jal.	33 kW	Radio Televisión
14	5	XEX-TDT	Altzomoni, Mex. Tejupilco de Hidalgo, Mex. Tenancingo, Mex. Taxco, Gro. Pachuca, Hgo. (RF 43); Cuernavaca, Mor. San Martín Texmelucan, Pue. Tlaxcala, Tlax.	236 kW; 20 kW; 20 kW; 21 kW; 8 kW; 45 kW; 20 kW; 30 kW	Radio Televisión
36	5	XHTOK-TDT	Toluca/Jocotitlán, Mex.	280 kW	Radio Televisión
21	5	XHAPZ-TDT	Apatzingán, Mich.	47 kW	Radio Televisión
33	5	XHLAC-TDT	Lazaro Cárdenas, Mich.	25 kW	Radio Televisión
29	5	XHMOW-TDT	Cerro Burro, Mich.	338 kW	Radio Televisión
18	5	XHFX-TDT	Morelia, Mich.	47.2 kW	Radio Televisión
25	5	XHZAM-TDT	Zamora, Mich.	32 kW	Radio Televisión
33	5	XHTFL-TDT	Tepic, Nay.	55 kW	Radio Televisión
31	5	XET-TDT	Monterrey, NL	200 kW	Radio Televisión
19	5	XHHHN-TDT	Huajuapan de León, Oax. Tehuacán, Pue.	76 kW; 36 kW	Radio Televisión
35	5	XHIH-TDT	Cerro Palma Sola, Oax.	76 kW	Radio Televisión
34	5	XHOXO-TDT	Oaxaca, Oax.	97 kW	Radio Televisión
34	5	XHPIX-TDT	Pinotepa Nacional, Oax.	46 kW	Radio Televisión
29	5	XEZ-TDT	Querétaro, Qro. (Cerro El Zamorano); Cerro El Cimatario, Qro. Guanajuato, Gto. Irapuato-Celaya, Gto. San Miguel de Allende, Gto.	180 kW; 10 kW; 20 kW; 50 kW; 65 kW	Radio Televisión
27	5	XHQRO-TDT	Cancún, Q. Roo; Playa del Carmen, Q. Roo	60 kW; 20 kW	Radio Televisión
29	5	XHCQR-TDT	Chetumal, Q. Roo	28 kW	Radio Televisión
30	5	XHVST-TDT	Ciudad Valles, SLP	18 kW	Radio Televisión
34	5	XHSLT-TDT	San Luis Potosí, SLP	210 kW	Radio Televisión
24	5	XHCUI-TDT	Culiacán, Sin.	155 kW	Radio Televisión
29	5	XHLMI-TDT	Los Mochis, Sin.	110 kW	Radio Televisión
28	5	XHMAF-TDT	Mazatlán, Sin.	118 kW	Radio Televisión
17	5	XHCBO-TDT	Caborca, Son.	37 kW	Radio Televisión
36	5	XHCDO-TDT	Ciudad Obregón, Son.	200 kW	Radio Televisión
29	5	XHGUY-TDT	Guaymas, Son.	46 kW	Radio Televisión
29	5	XHHMS-TDT	Hermosillo, Son.	100 kW	Radio Televisión
26	5	XHNON-TDT	Nogales, Son.	35 kW	Radio Televisión
32	5	XHVIZ-TDT	Villahermosa, Tab.	125 kW	Televimex
22	5	XHCMU-TDT	Ciudad Mante, Tamps.	27 kW	Radio Televisión
36	5	XHUT-TDT	Ciudad Victoria, Tamps.	80 kW	Radio Televisión
28	2.2	XHTAM-TDT	Reynosa, Tamps.	265 kW	Televimex
25	5	XHBR-TDT	Nuevo Laredo, Tamps.	200 kW	Radio Televisión
15	5	XHD-TDT	Tampico, Tamps.	180 kW	Radio Televisión
27	5	XHCOV-TDT	Coatzacoalcos, Ver.	60 kW	Radio Televisión
28	5	XHAJ-TDT	Las Lajas; Nogales; Orizaba; San Andrés Tuxtla (RF 39)	430 kW; 25 kW; 60 kW; 20 kW	Radio Televisión
35	5	XHMEN-TDT	Mérida, Yuc.	125 kW	Radio Televisión
23	5	XHSMZ-TDT	Sombrerete, Zac.	32 kW	Radio Televisión
17	5	XHBQ-TDT	Zacatecas, Zac.	130 kW	Radio Televisión

== Network logos ==
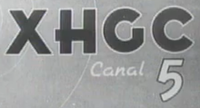
1952-1964

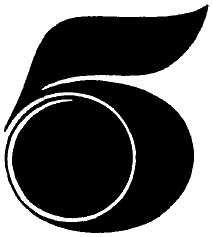
1980-1986 (similar to Channel 5 honduran logo and KSTP-TV in United States)

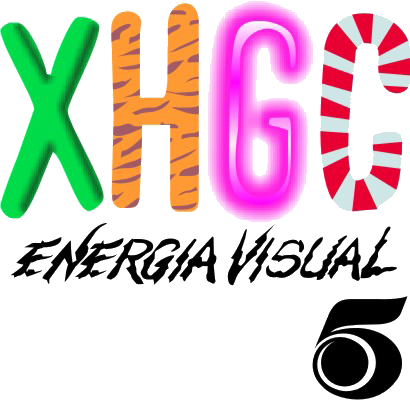
1988-1989

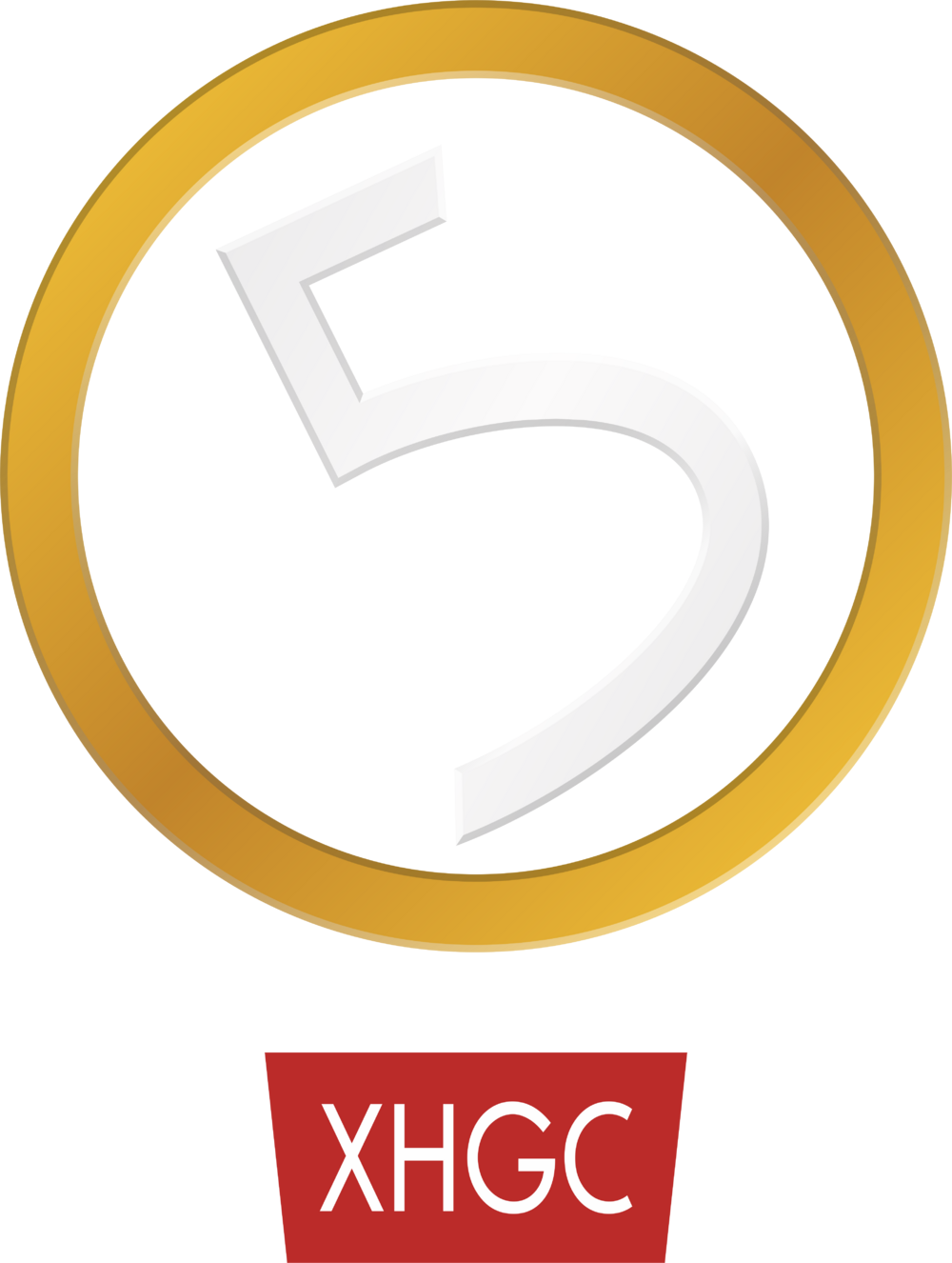
1993-1994

1994-1996

1996-1997

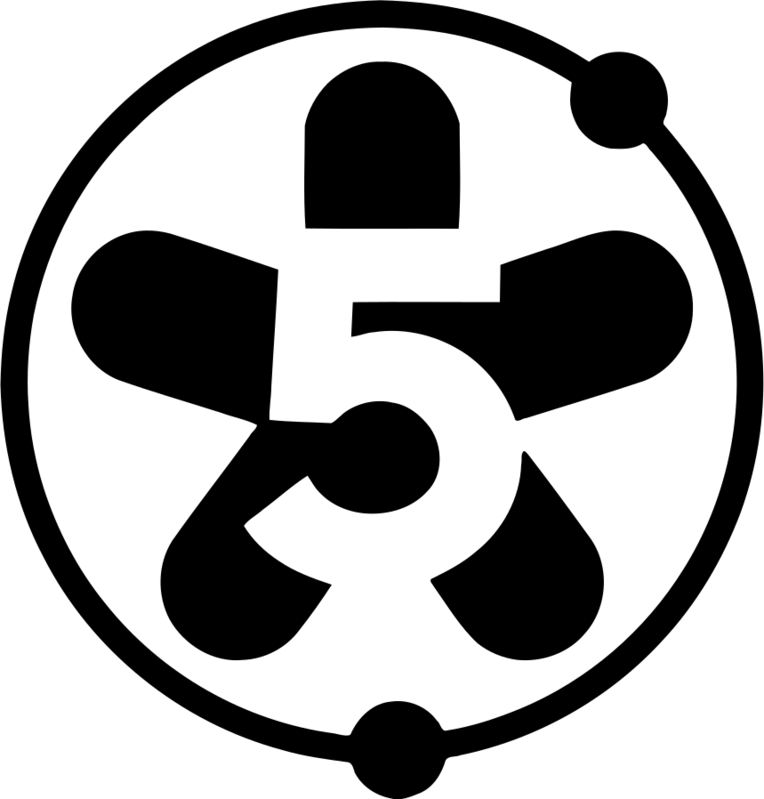
1997-2000

2000-2002 (with slight variants until 2007)

2002-2007

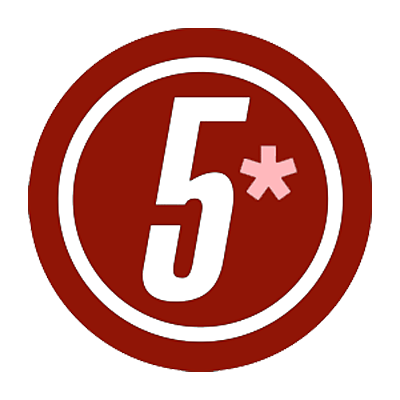
2007-2014 Bumpers and Promos

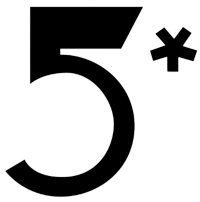
2013

2013-2014

2014-2016

2016-present

== In-House Advertising ==
Since its inception in 1952, the channel has always prided itself on always producing its own adverting content.

=== Cortinillas de Iñárritu ===
In the early 1990s-until early 2000s, Canal 5 contracted Alejandro González Iñárritu (now Academy Award and Ariel Award winner) to become the channel's creative image director. The result was several dozen zany and sometimes controversial spots ranging in length from 5-seconds to 30-seconds.

Included in this series are the titles; "XHGC: Hacer Reír Es Un Placer" (or XHGC: Making People Laugh Is a Pleasure) with Gael García Bernal, "Es Más" (or It's More), "No Te Quiebres La Cabeza (El Huevo)" (or Don't Break Your Brain (The Egg) with Gerardo Gallardo and voice-over by Rubén Trujillo, "¿Quién te preguntó?" (or Who asked you?) with Bruno Bichir, "No Te Quemes" (or Don't Get Burned, "Cruellas" with Yadira Pascault Orozco and Mitzi Martin, "High Five Girls" (also featuring Yadira Pascault Orozco and Mitzi Martin), "Una Idea Sencilla" (or A Simple Idea), and "No Seas Mosca Muerta", (or Don't Be A Dead Fly) with Claudia Ramírez.

== In popular culture ==
Canal 5 gained traction in April 2020, when its Twitter page began posting strange and disturbing videos in the early morning hours, including an edit of Michael Rosen's Lunchtime poem and footage from the 1995 demo animation of The Adventures of Johnny Quasar, later known for its titular character being revisioned into the character of Jimmy Neutron. With the videos having been deleted afterwards, since then, the posts have been investigated and widely shared and talked about in Mexican media. Infobae México contacted one of the collaborators of Channel 5. However, they claimed no knowledge regarding the disturbing posts.

Simultaneously, a VHS recording of the network's community service strand dated from 2001 showing the disappearance of a mysterious Selene Delgado López went viral. This case in particular caused the creation of a series of theories about the supposed missing woman, which caused a possible link to a Facebook account to a person of the same name, whose social media accounts turned out to be fake, creating an urban legend.
