= N+ Foro =

Mexican TV news channel

- Type: Cable/broadcast network
- Country: Mexico

Programming
- Picture format: 1080i HDTV

Ownership
- Owner: TelevisaUnivision

History
- Launched: 15 February 2010; 16 years ago
- Replaced: 4TV (Free-to-air frequencies)
- Former names: Foro TV (2010–2022); Foro (2022–2024)

Links
- Website: www.nmas.com.mx/foro-tv

Availability

Terrestrial
- Digital terrestrial television (Mexico City): Channel 4.1
- Digital terrestrial television (Rest of the country): Listings may vary

N+ Foro is a broadcast news television channel owned by TelevisaUnivision. It is seen on most Mexican cable systems and full-time on two stations in Mexico, including XHTV-TDT in Mexico City, with selected programs airing on Televisa Regional and Televisa local stations. Foro is available on most Mexican cable and fiber-optic systems and the SKY Mexico satellite service, as well as on several national cable systems in the United States.

== History ==
FOROtv launched on cable and satellite on 15 February 2010, and marked Televisa's return to the cable news business after operating the Noticias ECO service between 1988 and 2001. On 30 August of that year, it made its broadcast television debut when XHTV ditched its programming lineup aimed at Mexico City to carry FOROtv's programs.

On 28 March 2022, the channel was rebranded to simply Foro, and is now classed as an extension of TelevisaUnivision's "N+" banner of news programming.

On 13 September 2024, Foro changes its name again, adding the logo of its production company N+, and from that day onwards it was called N+ Foro.

== Current programs ==
Some of the programs on Foro currently include the following:

- Las Noticias con Erik Camacho (The News with Erik Camacho, 5 am morning newscast)
- Expresso de la mañana (Morning Express, hosted by Esteban Arce)
- Paralelo 23 (23rd Parallel, hosted by Ana Lucía Ordoñana)
- Noticias MX (News MX, anchored by Enrique Campos)
- A las Tres (At 3:00, anchored by Ana Paula Ordorica)
- Fractal (Factual, anchored by Ana Francisca Vega)
- Agenda Pública (Public Agenda with Mario Campos)
- En la mira (In an Hour with Eduardo Salazar)
- Hora 21 (The 21st Hour, anchored by Julio Patan)
- Es La Hora De Opinar (It's Time to Discuss with Leo Zuckermann)
- Oppenheimer Presenta (Oppenheimer Presents with Andres Oppenheimer)

=== Sports ===
Foro carries some sports coverage which is overlaid with documentary and news review programming outside Mexico. This includes coverage of Formula 1, MLB, NHL, NBA, Sunday afternoon NFL games, and NASCAR.

== Stations ==
=== Full-time ===
Foro programming is carried full-time on Mexico City's XHTV-TDT.

In January 2018, Televisa was approved to put FOROtv as a digital subchannel of six of its regional stations, primarily in northern Mexico. Another 18 stations (Guadalajara, Monterrey, San Luis Potosí, Morelia and Puebla, followed by Aguascalientes, Chihuahua, Cuernavaca, León, Torreón, Toluca and Durango, then Acapulco, Coatzacoalcos, Culiacán, Mérida, Oaxaca, Querétaro, Saltillo and Xalapa) were added in early 2018.

=== Part-time ===
Foro's lack of full-time stations, however, was traditionally supplemented by its use by Televisa's local partners and most Televisa Regional stations. Most of these stations only took selected newscasts in key dayparts. With Televisa shedding many of its local affiliate partners, these relationships have come to an end.

The American version of the network departs from the main Foro schedule in late night to air domestically originated paid programming. This received voluminous criticism from American viewers, especially during breaking news situations when it overlays overnight breaking news coverage (in the past, paid programming also aired during the daytime, but this has since been discontinued). There are occasionally some technical issues during network programming, as TelevisaUnivision must air other content over the Mexican ad breaks, usually with looping promotional advertisements for Foro itself and other TelevisaUnivision American networks, along with domestic advertising.

== Repeaters ==
The following stations, all but two Las Estrellas repeaters, carry Foro. As mentioned above, the network's flagship is XHTV-TDT in Mexico City, and in Ciudad Juárez, it is carried on the second subchannel of the Televisa local station, as that city's Las Estrellas repeater carries a secondary feed for viewers and pay-TV providers in El Paso, Texas with American-centric advertising and blackouts of programming claimed by American-side stations.

RF	VC	Call sign	Location	ERP	Concessionaire
34	2.2	XHBM-TDT	Mexicali	180 kW	Televimex
22	19.2	XHUAA-TDT	Tijuana	200 kW	Televimex
28	2.2	XHLPT-TDT	La Paz	26 kW	Televimex
34	2.2	XHCPA-TDT	Campeche	28 kW	Televimex
16	2.2	XHSCC-TDT	San Cristobal de las Casas	30 kW	Televimex
21	8.2	XHJCI-TDT	Cd. Juárez	50 kW	Televisora de Occidente
26	2.2	XHFI-TDT	Chihuahua	47 kW	Televimex
15	4.1	XHTV-TDT	Mexico City	270 kW	Televimex
20	2.2	XHO-TDT	Torreón	150 kW	Televimex
16	2.2	XHBZ-TDT	Colima; Manzanillo; Cd. Guzmán, Jal	54 kW; 30 kW; 15 kW	Televimex
21	2.2	XHDI-TDT	Durango; Santiago Papasquiaro, Dgo. (RF 17)	94 kW	Televimex
27	2.2	XHLGT-TDT	León; Guanajuato	180 kW; 20 kW	Televimex
22	2.2	XHAP-TDT	Acapulco	55 kW	Televimex
20	2.2	XHCK-TDT	Chilpancingo	50 kW	Televimex
32	2.2	XHANT-TDT	Autlán de Navarro	43 kW	Televimex
24	2.2	XHGA-TDT	Guadalajara	150 kW	Televimex
36	2.2	XHTM-TDT	Altzomoni; Tejupilco de Hidalgo; Taxco, Gro. Pachuca, Hgo. (RF 39); Cuernavaca, Mor. San Martín Texmelucan, Pue. Tlaxcala, Tlax.	236 kW; 20 kW; 21 kW; 8 kW; 45 kW; 20 kW; 30 kW	Televimex
19	2.2	XHTOL-TDT	Toluca/Jocotitlán	45 kW	Televimex
30	2.2	XHURT-TDT	Cerro Burro, Mich.	338 kW	Televimex
29	2.2	XHZMT-TDT	Zamora	32 kW	Televimex
28	2.2	XHTEN-TDT	Tepic	55 kW	Televimex
23	2.2	XHX-TDT	Monterrey; Saltillo, Coah. Sabinas Hidalgo	200 kW; 45 kW; 4.8 kW	Televimex
31	2.2	XHHLO-TDT	Huajuapan de León; Tehuacán, Pue	76 kW; 36 kW	Televimex
29	2.2	XHBN-TDT	Oaxaca	97 kW	Televimex
32	2.2	XHZ-TDT	Querétaro (Cerro El Zamorano); Cerro El Cimatario; Guanajuato, Gto. Irapuato-Celaya, Gto. San Miguel de Allende, Gto.	180 kW; 10 kW; 20 kW; 50 kW; 65 kW	Televimex
30	2.2	XHCDV-TDT	Ciudad Valles	18 kW	Televimex
31	2.2	XHSLA-TDT	San Luis Potosí	210 kW	Televimex
23	2.2	XHBT-TDT	Culiacán	155 kW	Televimex
25	2.2	XHBS-TDT	Los Mochis; Cd. Obregón, Son (RF 30)	110 kW; 200 kW	Televimex
25	2.2	XHOW-TDT	Mazatlán	118 kW	Televimex
23	2.2	XHHES-TDT	Hermosillo	100 kW	Televimex
17	2.2	XHGO-TDT	Tampico	180 kW	Televimex
24	2.2	XHCV-TDT	Coatzacoalcos	60 kW	Televimex
17	2.2	XHAH-TDT	Las Lajas; Nogales; Orizaba	430 kW; 25 kW; 60 kW	Televimex
30	2.2	XHTP-TDT	Mérida	125 kW	Televisora Peninsular
16	2.2	XHBD-TDT	Zacatecas; Aguascalientes, Ags.	130 kW; 10 kW	Televimex

== See also ==
- Noticieros Televisa
