= Nueve (Mexican TV network) =

Mexican television network

- Type: Terrestrial television network
- Country: Mexico
- Transmitters: see below

Programming
- Language: Spanish
- Picture format: 1080i HDTV

Ownership
- Owner: TelevisaUnivision

History
- Launched: 1 September 1968; 58 years ago
- Former names: Canal 8 (1968–1985); Canal 9 (1985–2001); Galavisión (2001–2013); Gala TV (2013–2018)

Links
- Website: www.televisa.com/el-nueve/

Availability

Terrestrial
- Digital terrestrial television: Channel 9.1; San Luis Potosí: 8.1; Mexicali, Ciudad Juárez: 10.1; Durango: 13.1; Tijuana: 16.1

Nueve (English: Nine) (stylized Nu9ve) is a Mexican free-to-air television network owned by TelevisaUnivision. The primary station and network namesake is Channel 9 of Mexico City (also known by its call sign XEQ-TDT), though the network has nationwide coverage on Televisa stations and some affiliates. Nueve offers a range of general entertainment programs.

== History ==
Logo utilized from 2003 until 14 April 2013, when Galavisión was re-branded as "Gala TV"

The roots of Nueve go back to the foundation of Televisión Independiente de México, the first serious contender to Telesistema Mexicano. In 1973, the two companies merged to form Televisión Vía Satélite, better known as Televisa (now known as TelevisaUnivision Mexico).

In 1993, when Carlos Salinas de Gortari was president of Mexico, Televisa, through its subsidiary Radio Televisora de México Norte, S.A. de C.V., obtained the concession for 62 new stations, at the same time Televisión Azteca did the same. However, it was denounced at the time that the concessions weren't awarded in a transparent manner, without prior public bidding. Although, at the beginning, this 62-station network would be used to increase Canal 9's coverage, most of the stations were used to increase the coverage of Canal 5, and others, for El Canal de Las Estrellas.

After years of broadcasting primarily cultural programs, channel 9 in Mexico City returned to commercial programming in the mid-1990s, under the name Galavisión. This Galavisión was unrelated to the American cable channel of the same name, also owned by TelevisaUnivision.

On 15 April 2013, Galavisión changed its name to Gala TV.

Gala TV programs were traditionally carried out at a number of Televisa-affiliated local stations. In 2017, Televisa ended a significant number of these partnerships and began multiplexing Gala TV on various Canal 5 transmitters in larger markets.

On 9 July 2018, the network relaunched as Nueve, with a new programming lineup. The branding reflects the fact that its Mexico City station XEQ-TDT and most of its retransmitters broadcast on virtual channel 9.

== Programming ==
Logo used as Gala TV, between 2013 and 2018

The Nueve schedule features mainly reruns of major Mexican telenovelas, reruns of TelevisaUnivision Mexico series, as well as soccer and lucha libre and old Mexican movies. On 18 March 2008, it was announced that an agreement was made between Televisa and NBCUniversal that Galavisión would broadcast Telemundo programs on Galavisión as well as on selected channels of SKY México and Cablevision beginning in April 2008.

As part of the Nueve relaunch, Televisa signed deals with Discovery and National Geographic to air their content. The relaunch also included a new entertainment program, Intrusos, hosted by entertainment journalist Juan José Origel.

== Stations ==
Nueve is not nominally a national network; unlike Las Estrellas or Canal 5, it does not meet the national coverage threshold necessary to be considered one by the Federal Telecommunications Institute.

There is significant variance in the programming schedules of Nueve and its stations, not seen with Las Estrellas or Canal 5.

Some stations are full-time repeaters, usually broadcasting on channel 9.1, clearing all Nueve programming while only inserting local advertising. Others also carry N+ Foro, Televisa Regional, and/or local programs.

There are also several Nueve feeds multiplexed on (primarily) Canal 5 transmitters, which carry Nueve programming full-time. Some of these subchannels may also have local programming.

Not all Mexican stations using virtual channel 9 are part of the Nueve network. In some cases, these stations block Nu9ve from using channel 9 in those areas. Most notably, the list includes CORTV in Oaxaca, XHUJED-TDT in Durango and XHSLS-TDT in San Luis Potosí. Televisa also owns Las Estrellas transmitter XERV-TDT in Reynosa, Tamaulipas, which has assigned channel 9. The stations in Tijuana, Mexicali and Ciudad Juárez cannot use virtual channel 9 because of signal overlap to stations in the United States using it.

RF	VC	Call sign	Location	ERP	Concessionaire
32	9	XHAGU-TDT	Aguascalientes, Ags.	240 kW	Teleimagen del Noroeste
15	10	XHMEE-TDT	Mexicali, BC	200 kW	Teleimagen del Noroeste
23	16	XETV-TDT	Tijuana, BC	200 kW	Radio Televisión
29	9	XHLPB-TDT	La Paz, BCS	26 kW	Radio Televisión
22	9	XHAN-TDT	Campeche, Camp.	28 kW	Radio Televisión
22	9	XHCZC-TDT	Comitán de Domínguez, Chis.	32 kW	Televimex
17	9	XHSNC-TDT	San Cristóbal de las Casas, Chis.	30 kW	Radio Televisión
34	9	XHTAH-TDT	Tapachula, Chis.	62 kW	Radio Televisión
29	9	XHTUA-TDT	Tuxtla Gutiérrez, Chis.	45 kW	Televimex
33	10	XHJUB-TDT	Ciudad Juárez, Chih.	200 kW	Radio Televisión
24	9	XHCHZ-TDT	Chihuahua; Cd. Cuauhtémoc	47 kW; 26 kW	Radio Televisión
22	9	XEQ-TDT	Mexico City	270 kW	Teleimagen del Noroeste
20	9	XHPN-TDT	Piedras Negras, Coah.	43 kW	Teleimagen del Noroeste
24	9	XHAE-TDT	Saltillo, Coah.	45 kW	Teleimagen del Noroeste
26	9	XHTOB-TDT	Torreón, Coah.	150 kW	Teleimagen del Noroeste
26	9	XHCKW-TDT	Colima, Col.	54 kW	Teleimagen del Noroeste
36	9	XHMAW-TDT	Manzanillo, Col.	35 kW	Teleimagen del Noroeste
17	13	XHDUH-TDT	Durango, Dgo.	94 kW	Radio Televisión
23	9	XHL-TDT	León, Gto. Celaya-Irapuato; Lagos de Moreno, Jal.	180 kW 19 kW	Televisora de Occidente
22	9	XHACZ-TDT	Acapulco, Gro.	15 kW	Teleimagen del Noroeste
34	9	XHCHN-TDT	Chilpancingo, Gro.	50 kW	Radio Televisión
26	9	XEWO-TDT	Guadalajara, Jal.	150 kW	Televisora de Occidente
16	9	XHATZ-TDT	Altzomoni, Mex.	236 kW	Teleimagen del Noroeste
22	9	XEQ-TDT (Note: This station, while licensed as a repeater of XEQ in Mexico City, airs its own locally-targeted programming under the name Nu9ve Estado de México.)	Toluca/Jocotitlán, Mex.	200 kW	Teleimagen del Noroeste
25	9	XHZAM-TDT	Zamora, Mich.	32 kW	Radio Televisión
29	9	XHMOW-TDT	Morelia, Mich.	338 kW	Radio Televisión
28	9	XHCUM-TDT	Cuernavaca, Mor.	45 kW	Teleimagen del Noroeste
33	9	XHTFL-TDT	Tepic, Nay.	55 kW	Radio Televisión
32	9	XHMOY-TDT	Monterrey, NL	200 kW	Teleimagen del Noroeste
32	8	XHOXO-TDT	Oaxaca, Oax.	97.033 kW	Radio Televisión
18	9	XHQCZ-TDT	Querétaro, Qro. (Cerro El Zamorano); Cerro El Cimatario; Irapuato-Celaya, Gto.	190 kW; 9 kW; 10 kW	Teleimagen del Noroeste
27	9	XHQRO-TDT	Cancún, Q. Roo; Playa del Carmen	60 kW; 20 kW	Radio Televisión
29	9	XHCQR-TDT	Chetumal, Q. Roo	28 kW	Televimex
34	8	XHSLT-TDT	San Luis Potosí	210 kW	Televimex
24	9	XHCUI-TDT	Culiacán, Sin.	155 kW	Teleimagen del Noroeste
29	9	XHLMI-TDT	Los Mochis, Sin.	110 kW	Teleimagen del Noroeste
28	9	XHMAF-TDT	Mazatlán, Sin.	118 kW	Radio Televisión
36	9	XHCDO-TDT	Ciudad Obregón, Son.	200 kW	Radio Televisión
31	9	XHHMA-TDT	Hermosillo, Son.	100 kW	Teleimagen del Noroeste
32	9	XHVIZ-TDT	Villahermosa, Tab.	125 kW	Televimex
26	9	XHCVI-TDT	Ciudad Victoria, Tamps.	80 kW	Teleimagen del Noroeste
16	9	XHTPZ-TDT	Tampico, Tamps.	180 kW	Televisora de Occidente
27	9	XHCOV-TDT	Coatzacoalcos, Ver.	60 kW	Radio Televisión
34	9	XHCLV-TDT	Las Lajas, Ver. Nogales, Ver.	430 kW; 25 kW	Teleimagen del Noroeste
35	9	XHMEN-TDT	Mérida, Yuc.	125 kW	Radio Televisión
19	9	XHZAT-TDT	Zacatecas, Zac.	130 kW	Teleimagen del Noroeste
