= Channel 12 =

Channel 12 or TV12 may refer to:

- YSWX, Channel 12 (El Salvador), a television channel in El Salvador
- Channel 12 (Israel), a television channel in Israel
- CCTV-12, a Chinese television channel
- The former analog channel number of TV Tokyo, a television station in Tokyo, Japan
- Bajío TV Canal 12.1 in León, Guanajuato, Mexico.
- Canal 6 Multimedios TV a Television Network in Mexico whose flagship Station used Channel 12
- Canal 12 (Nicaragua), a television channel in Nicaragua
- Mediacorp TV12, a Singaporean company that operated three television channels
- TV12 (Sweden), a Swedish television channel
- Canal 12 Teledoce, an Uruguayan television channel
- BS12 TwellV, a Japanese television channel
- Kanal 12, the former name of Estonian television channel Duo 5
- OP12, a defunct Belgian Dutch-language television channel
- TV12 (Isle of Wight), a defunct television station in the Isle of Wight, United Kingdom

== Argentina ==
- Channel 12 (Misiones, Argentina)
- Channel 12 (Trenque Lauquen, Argentina)
- El Doce, a television station in Córdoba, Argentina

== See also ==
- Channel 12 branded TV stations in the United States
- Channel 12 virtual TV stations in Canada
- Channel 12 virtual TV stations in Mexico
- Channel 12 virtual TV stations in the United States

For VHF frequencies covering 204-210 MHz:

- Channel 12 TV stations in Canada
- Channel 12 TV stations in Mexico
- Channel 12 digital TV stations in the United States
- Channel 12 low-power TV stations in the United States
