= Channel 12 virtual TV stations in Mexico =

The Following television stations Operate on Virtual Channel 12 in Mexico:

== Regional networks ==
- Radio y Televisión de Hidalgo in the state of Hidalgo

== Local Stations ==
- Bajío TV Canal 12.1 in León, Guanajuato.
- XEWT-TDT in Tijuana, Baja California
- XHTUG-TDT in Tuxtla Gutiérrez, Chiapas
- XHAMO-TDT in Colima, Colima
- XHND-TDT in Durango, Durango
- XHAK-TDT in Hermosillo, Sonora
- XHFM-TDT in Veracruz, Veracruz
