= Ana Velia Guzmán =

Mexican journalist (1975–2024)

- Born: 1975
- Died: 30 September 2024 (aged 49)
- Known for: Journalist, television presenter

Ana Velia Guzmán y Maldonado (1975 – 30 September 2024) was a Mexican journalist and television presenter for Televisa Tijuana. She also worked for France 24 and Univisión.

== Biography ==
Velia was born in Jalisco, Mexico. She began her career in 1999, when she started as a reporter for Channel 12. Later, she joined TV Azteca, where she served as presenter of the news program Hechos Baja California. She was the host of this program from 2010 to 2018. She was also a correspondent for France 24. She operated a YouTube channel "Diálogos con Ana Velia Guzmán".

Velia was also a professor at the Autonomous University of Baja California (UABC) and Academic Vice President of COLCOMBC.

Velia died at hospital in San Diego at the age of 49. She had been diagnosed with breast cancer in 2021. The director of Humanities at the College of Communicologists of Baja California, Diana Merchant said she was "more than a journalist; she was a defender of freedom of expression". Her funeral was held on 4 October in Tijuana. Velia Guzmán is survived by her husband and son.
