= Durango Institute of Technology =

- Instituto Tecnológico de Durango
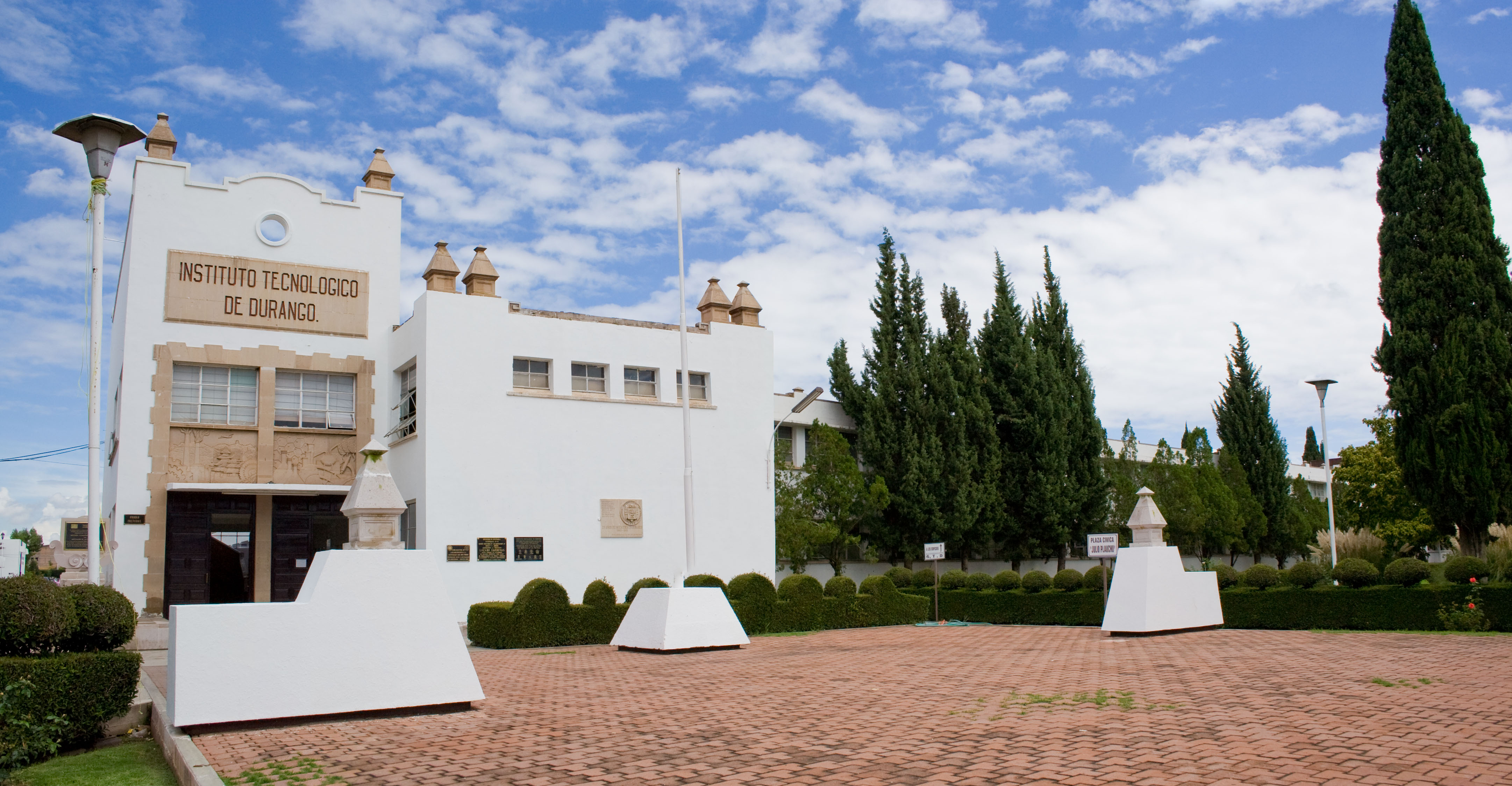
- Motto: La Técnica al Servicio de la Patria
- Motto in English: The Technique at the Service of the Country
- Type: Public university
- Established: 2 August 1948
- Affiliations: ANUIES
- Director: Guillermo de Anda Rodríguez
- Administrative staff: 635
- Location: Durango, Durango, Mexico; 24°01′52.39″N 104°38′48.89″W
- Campus: Urban
- Colors: Crimson and white
- Mascot: White female donkey
- Website: http://www.itdurango.edu.mx/

The Durango Institute of Technology (in Spanish: Instituto Tecnológico de Durango) is a Mexican public university located in the state of Durango.
