= Paseo Durango =

Shopping mall in Victoria de Durango, Mexico

Paseo Durango is a two-story shopping mall in the city of Victoria de Durango, capital of the state of Durango, Mexico. This opened in 2007.

== Anchors ==
- Liverpool department store
- Suburbia department store
- Cinemex
- Fiesta Inn Hotel
