= Dolores Guerrero =

Mexican poet

- Born: 15 September 1833; Durango, Mexico
- Died: 1 March 1858 (aged 24); Durango, Mexico
- Known for: First Mexican female poet

Dolores Guerrero (1833–1858) was a Mexican poet, considered by some sources like El Siglo de Durango as the first female Mexican poet, aside from Juana Inés de la Cruz.

== Biography ==
Dolores Guerrero was born on 15 September in 1833 in the city of Durango, Mexico. She was the daughter of Fernando Guerrero and Gudalupe Bárcena. Since a very early age, Guerrero became interested in poetry and started writing short verses. She also had an affinity for music and used to read classic French novels with the help of her advanced French skills.

In 1850, when she was 17 years old, she moved to the Federal District (Mexico City) where her father was elected as a senator. There she continued her poetic work. Some of here works reached the writers Francisco Zarco and Francisco González Bocanegra, who motivated her to publish her materials.

According to the newspaper El Siglo de Durango, she was often described as the first female Mexican poet after Juana Inés de la Cruz. Her works were very well received by society. More than several other newspapers also regularly published her poetry.

According to Susana A. Montero, the author of Symbolic Construction of Social Identities, Guerrero's poetry was a representative of the erotic genre.

Guerrero died on 1 March 1858 in Durango, due to heart issues.

== Tributes and honors ==
In 2008, the University Universidad Juárez del Estado de Durango paid a tribute by organizing an even in honor of Guerrero.
