= Durango (city) =

Capital and largest city in the northern Mexico state

Durango Victoria de Durango Korian
- City
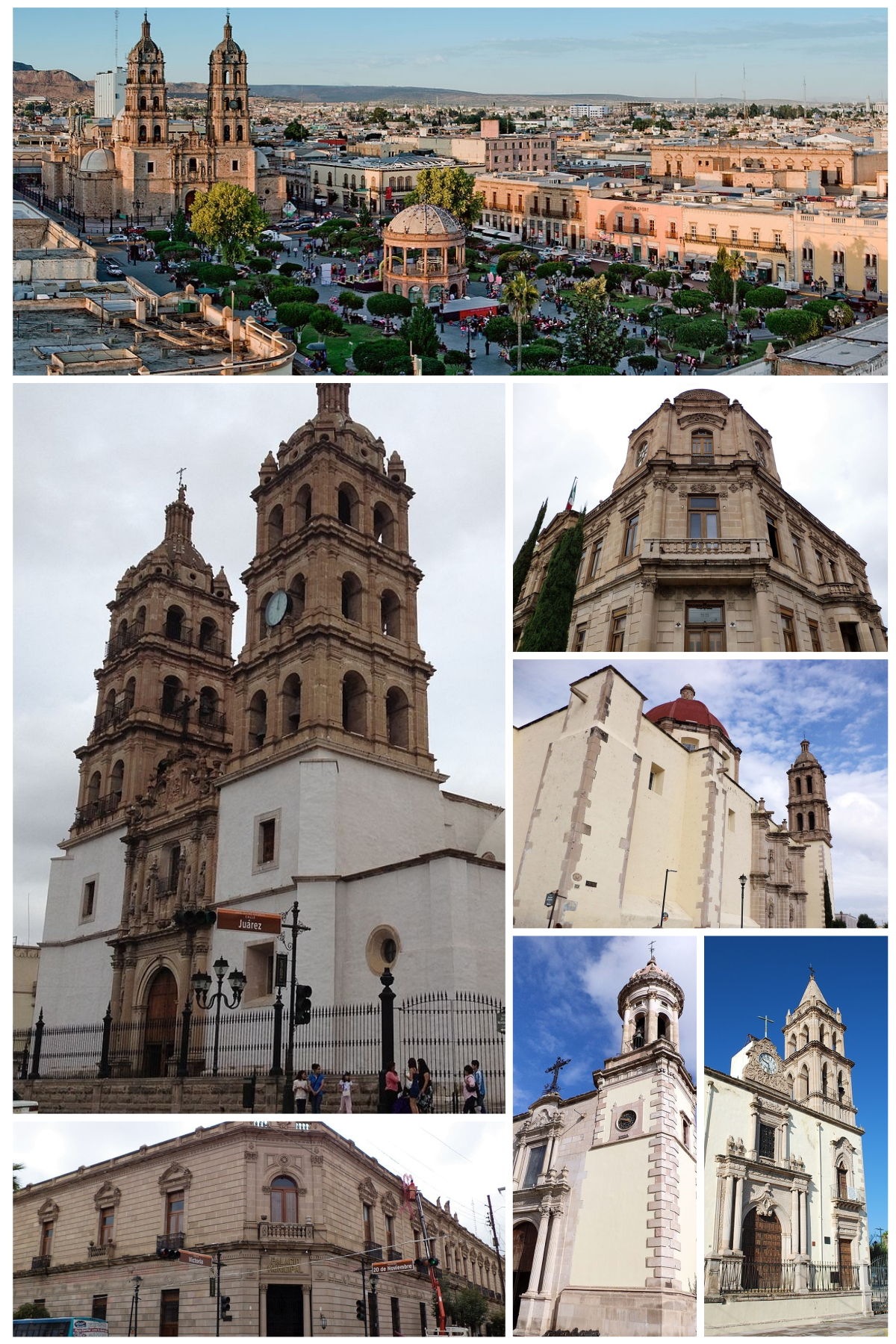
- Left to right, top to bottom: Plaza de Armas, Cathedral Basilica of Durango, Quinta del Aguacate, Santa Ana y la Sagrada Familia Parish, City Hall, San Agustín Temple, and San Juan Bautista Parish

- Coat of arms
- Nicknames: La Perla del Guadiana, La Tierra del Cine
- Location of Durango within the State

- Location in Mexico
- Coordinates: 24°01′30″N 104°40′03″W
- Country: Mexico
- State: Durango
- Municipality: Durango
- Founded: 8 July 1563; 463 years ago
- Founder: Francisco de Ibarra

Government
  - Mayor: Jorge Alejandro Salum del Palacio
  - Federal electoral district: Durango's 4th

Area
  - City: 118 km^{2} (46 sq mi)
- Elevation: 1,890 m (6,200 ft)

Population (2020)
  - City: 616,068
  - Density: 5,220/km^{2} (13,500/sq mi)
  - Urban: 658,786
  - Metro: 688,697
  - Demonym: duranguense/durangueño

GDP (PPP, constant 2015 values)
  - Year: 2023
  - Total: $12.7 billion
  - Per capita: $19,000
- Time zone: UTC−06:00 (Zona Centro)
- Postal code: 34000
- Area code: 618
- Website: https://municipiodurango.gob.mx/

Victoria de Durango, commonly known as Durango (Spanish pronunciation: [duˈɾaŋɡo], Southeastern Tepehuan: Korian), is the capital and largest city of the northern Mexican state of Durango and the seat of the municipality of Durango. It has a population of 616,068 as of the 2020 census with 688,697 living in the municipality. The city's official name is Victoria de Durango, renamed in honor of the first president of Mexico, Guadalupe Victoria, a native of the state of Durango. The city is at an altitude of 1,890 m (6,201 ft) in the Valley of Guadiana.

Durango was founded on 8 July 1563, by the Spanish explorer Francisco de Ibarra. During the Spanish colonial era the city was the capital of the Nueva Vizcaya province of New Spain, which consisted mostly of what became the Mexican states of Durango and Chihuahua. The city was founded due to its proximity to the Cerro del Mercado, in the northern part of the modern city, which was believed to contain large amounts of silver. Eventually, an important iron deposit was discovered.

== History ==
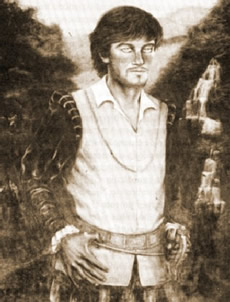
Captain Francisco de Ibarra

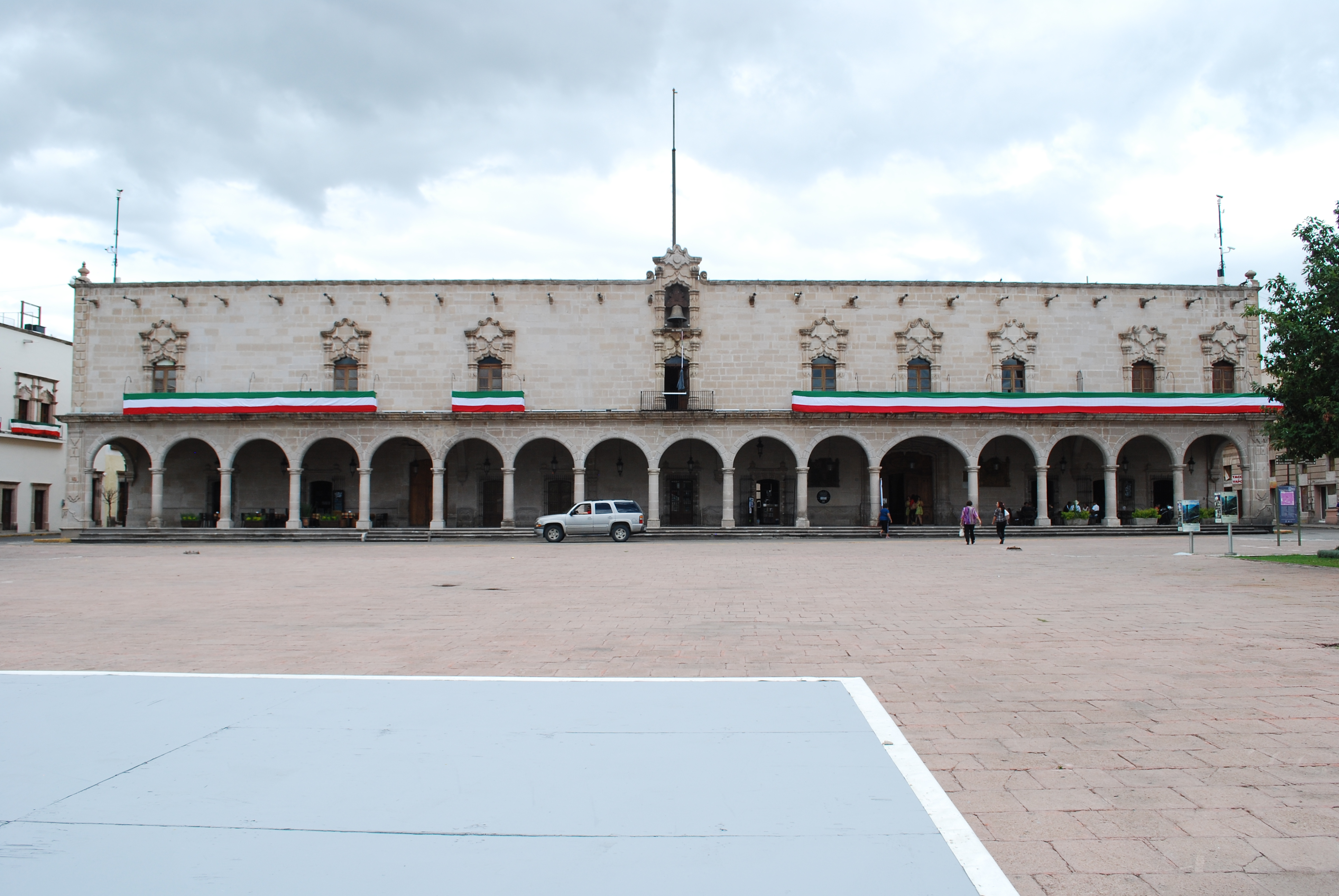
The Palace of Government of Durango (Governor's Office)

The town was named by Francisco de Ibarra after his hometown Durango in the Spanish province of Biscay. The name Durango is of Basque origin. Ibarra also named the surrounding area Nuevo Vizcaya (New Biscay). The official name of the city became Victoria de Durango in 1826, in honor of Guadalupe Victoria, the first president of Mexico and native of the state. The city's coat-of-arms serves as the seal for the state.

Since the pre-historic period the area was a conduit for influences from north and south, between Aridoamerica and Mesoamerica. The first inhabitants of the area were a people called the Nahoas, nomads who came to the area from the north about 2,000 years ago. By the Post Classic period, the area became inhabited by the Zacatecans and the Tepehuanos, who migrated here from the north-west.

The modern city began as a mining town, officially founded as Villa de Durango by Francisco de Ibarra on 8 July 1563. Ibarra was sent north by Viceroy Luis de Velasco to conquer the territory and found the city. The site was chosen because of its proximity to the Cerro de Mercado, thought at the time to contain reserves of silver, but instead was found to be an important source of iron. The mountain was named for Captain Ginés Vázquez de Mercado, who discovered the valley on his expeditions in the north. The site was also chosen because it was close to the Franciscan mission at Analco, which was a source of water, wood, and animals to hunt. The initial layout of the town was done by Alonso de Pacheco, bordered by what became Madero and Constitución streets on running north–south, and by 5 February and 20 November running east–west. The historic center is located around the Plaza de Armas (main square) and the Cathedral Basilica.

Due to its distance from Mexico City, the city and the surrounding communities developed relatively autonomously. Some of the earliest missions in the north of the country are located in and around the city. It became an important stop on the road north to conquer what is now the north of Mexico and Southwest U.S. The Jesuits were also missionaries here from 1596 until their expulsion from New Spain in 1767. They founded the Colegio de Guadiana, which was the main educational institution for northern Mexico during the colonial period.

The town became a parish in 1620. It was officially named a city on 3 March 1630. Difficulties forced the near-abandonment of the city of Durango in the 17th century, with the provincial capital moving to Parral, but starting in 1680, the city began to grow again. This was because the mines in Parral had started to give out and the reduction in violence as the Spanish government succeeded in subduing the native peoples. The city regained its role as the province's capital on 10 October 1738.

Durango provided peak influence during the 18th century because of the mining of various minerals in the nearby Sierra Madre Occidental. The bonanza allowed for the creation of several grand colonial-era buildings in the city center.

Various players in the War of Independence, including Miguel Hidalgo, were executed here on 17 July 1812. Their remains were buried at the Santuario de Nuestra Señora de Guadalupe.

In 1867, Benito Juárez stayed here while traveling north.

The city became an archdiocese on 23 June 1891.

During the late 19th and early 20th century, the city of Durango remained the political center of the state and a regional commercial center for agricultural and handcrafted products. Mayors of the city concentrated on improving infrastructure, such as government buildings, hospitals, water supply lines, and public streets. The population grew.

In 1911, the city joined the Mexican Revolution under the leadership of the Arrieta brothers. Domingo Arrieta took the city, and the soldiers under the command of Victoriano Huerta rebelled against the government. The Revolution led to the loss of production of both haciendas and factories. On 18 June 1913, insurgents took the city and burned businesses. The war led to economic depression lasting decades. In 1917, Domingo Arrieta, loyal to Venustiano Carranza, became governor of the state.

The destruction of the city center led to development outside of it, with the first neighborhood, Colonia Obrera of 1918, to break the historical limits of the city as it was near an ice factory and the rail line. The establishment of new neighborhoods (colonias) continued in the 1930s along the rail lines. Efforts were made from this time to the 1960s to regulate this growth.

The population grew noticeably in the 1960s and 1970s mostly due to migration from rural areas, increasing urban sprawl to 1,058 hectares. One major factor of this growth was the droughts of this time on agricultural production as well as expectations of industrial development.

The history of filmmaking in Durango started in 1898 with a clip titled A train arriving in Durango. However, in the 1950s, commercial filmmaking began in the city and surrounding areas. Director Jack Smith discovered La Ferrería Hacienda and found the landscape perfect for Western films. The first movie shot here was White Feather by 20th Century Fox. Over the following decades, various Hollywood and Mexican films were shot here, attracting various famous stars. These included Robert Wagner, Clark Gable, Charlton Heston, James Coburn, Charles Bronson, Glenn Ford, Anthony Quinn, and especially John Wayne, who shot seven films and bought a ranch called La Joya. Film production continued into the 1970s and 1980s, with Mexican companies using the area. More recent stars to work here include John Cusack, Kevin Costner, Salma Hayek, Penélope Cruz, Antonio Banderas, Catherine Zeta-Jones, and Brendan Fraser. Film production has diminished and the state has a director of cinematography to promote filmmaking. The main attraction for filmmakers is the variety of landscapes.

Population growth accelerated in the 1970s due to the city's economic development including cinematic production, and economic decline in other parts of the state. Transportation infrastructure increased with the establishment of the airport. Industrial parks such as Durango and Gómez Palacio were established.

New efforts to regulate growth were initiated in the early 1980s, especially in zoning with limited success. Housing developments began during this time with urban sprawl reaching 5,368 hectares by 1992.

Urban development in the 1990s into the 2000s focused on road paving as well as traffic signals. Throughways such as the Anillo Periférica (Ring Road) were built in the 2000s and 2010s.

The city became a World Heritage Site in 2010, as part of the Camino Real de Tierra Adentro. In the 2010s, many of the streetlights were replaced with those with LED lighting, to save costs and energy. In 2013, the city council voted unanimously to ban bullfighting in the municipality. In 2013, the city celebrated the 450th anniversary of its founding.

== Geography ==
Victoria de Durango is located 1,880 metres (6,170 ft) above sea level in the Valley of Guadiana, which is in the north of Mexico on the northwestern edge of the Central Mexican Highlands. It is in the southern part of the state, bordered by the municipalities of Canatlán, Pánuco de Coronado, Guadalupe Victoria, Pueblo Nuevo, Mezquital, Poanas, and San Dimas.

Most of the city's water comes from underground aquifers, affected by deforestation.

=== Climate ===
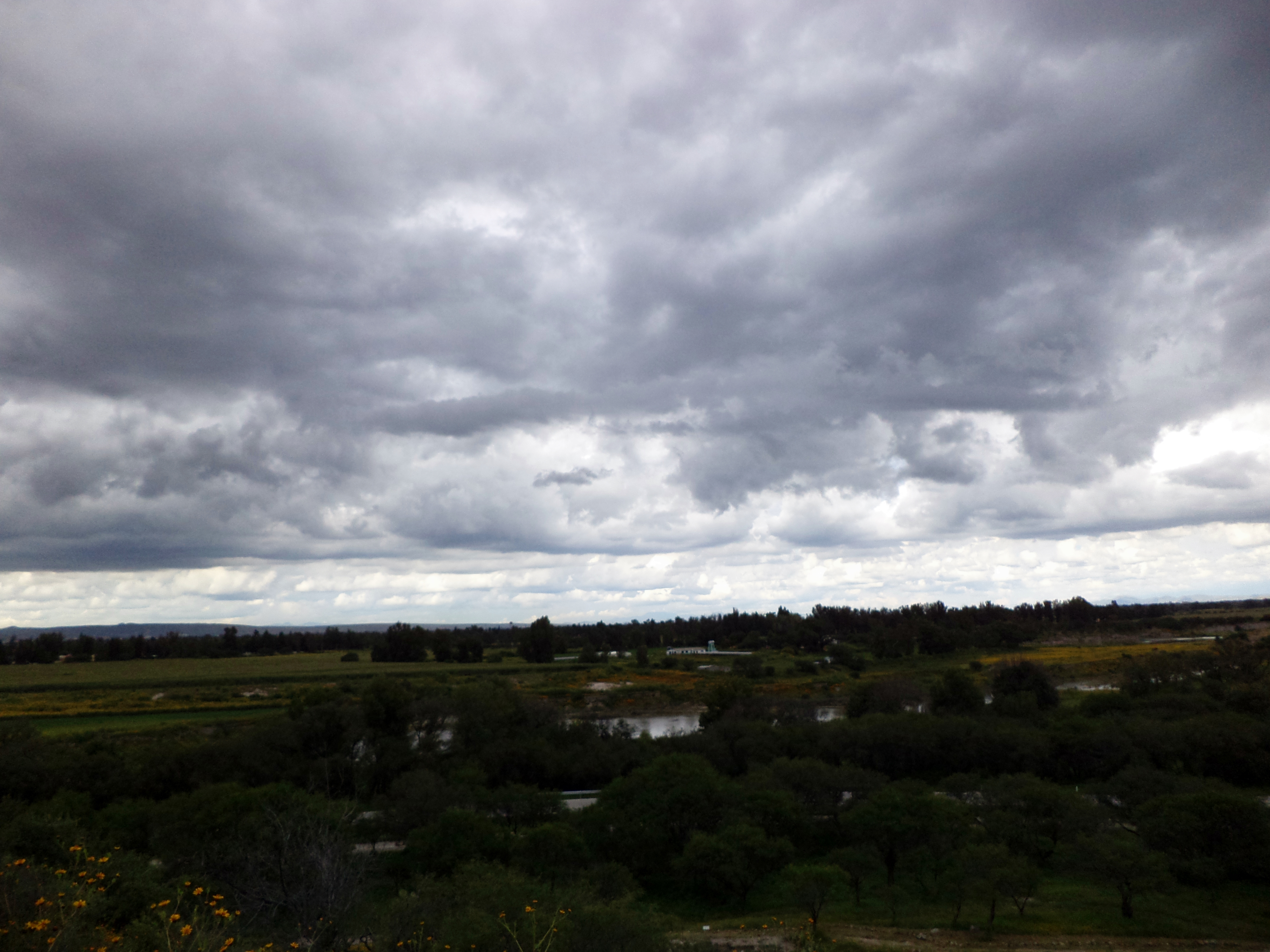
A fertile area is in south Durango, near La Ferrería site.

The city of Durango has a semi-arid climate, classified as BSk in the Köppen climate classification system. The climate is temperate in the western part of the city, with the average annual temperature being 15 °C (59 °F) and an average annual rainfall of 1,600 mm (63 in). In the eastern part, the average annual temperature is 19 °C (66 °F) and precipitation amounts to 500 mm (20 in).

Winters are mild, with an average daytime high of 21.1 °C (70.0 °F) in January. As a result of the high altitude and aridity during the winter months, the diurnal temperature range is large, resulting in cold nights, with an average low of 2.1 °C (35.8 °F) in January. Frosts are common in winter. Occasionally, temperatures can go above 30 °C (86 °F) while cold fronts from the north can push temperatures below −5 °C (23 °F). During the winter months, the climate is dominated by the subtropical ridge, resulting in dry conditions, with most days being clear and sunny. Precipitation is rare, with March being the driest month.

Summers are warm to hot, with June being the hottest month, with an average high of 30 °C (86 °F) and a low of 14 °C (57 °F). Most of the precipitation falls during the summer months, when the monsoon moves northwards, pushing moist air from the Gulf of California and the Gulf of Mexico into the area, leading to many days with precipitation. Generally, this usually occurs around mid-June. Afternoon storms are common in the summer, and they can be accompanied by hail or thunder. July and August have warm temperatures, averaging 28 °C (82 °F) though slightly cooler due to the presence of the rain. Humidity tends to be higher during the summer months, averaging 60% from June to September. March to April and October to November are transitional times with warm conditions during the day and cool or chilly conditions at night with occasional precipitation.

On average, Durango receives 529 mm (20.8 in) of precipitation per year, with 59 days of measureable precipitation. The wettest month recorded was August 1973 with 277.2 mm (10.9 in) and the record rainfall for a single day is 108.5 mm (4.3 in) on 15 September 1994. The extreme temperatures are −12 °C (10 °F) on 15 January 1951 and 40.5 °C (104.9 °F) on 13 June 2002.

Climate data for Victoria de Durango (1991–2020, extremes 1941–present)
Month	Jan	Feb	Mar	Apr	May	Jun	Jul	Aug	Sep	Oct	Nov	Dec	Year
Record high °C (°F)	32.0 (89.6)	32.0 (89.6)	36.0 (96.8)	38.5 (101.3)	39.5 (103.1)	40.5 (104.9)	38.0 (100.4)	37.0 (98.6)	37.4 (99.3)	34.0 (93.2)	34.0 (93.2)	32.5 (90.5)	40.5 (104.9)
Mean daily maximum °C (°F)	21.1 (70.0)	23.4 (74.1)	26.6 (79.9)	29.3 (84.7)	31.7 (89.1)	31.8 (89.2)	28.9 (84.0)	28.5 (83.3)	27.4 (81.3)	26.1 (79.0)	23.9 (75.0)	21.3 (70.3)	27.4 (81.3)
Daily mean °C (°F)	11.6 (52.9)	13.4 (56.1)	16.4 (61.5)	19.2 (66.6)	22.1 (71.8)	23.5 (74.3)	21.9 (71.4)	21.6 (70.9)	20.3 (68.5)	17.8 (64.0)	14.6 (58.3)	12.0 (53.6)	18.2 (64.8)
Mean daily minimum °C (°F)	2.1 (35.8)	3.4 (38.1)	6.2 (43.2)	9.1 (48.4)	12.4 (54.3)	15.2 (59.4)	14.8 (58.6)	14.6 (58.3)	13.1 (55.6)	9.4 (48.9)	5.2 (41.4)	2.6 (36.7)	9.0 (48.2)
Record low °C (°F)	−12.0 (10.4)	−12.0 (10.4)	−9.5 (14.9)	−6.0 (21.2)	1.4 (34.5)	3.5 (38.3)	1.3 (34.3)	7.0 (44.6)	2.0 (35.6)	0.0 (32.0)	−6.0 (21.2)	−10.0 (14.0)	−12.0 (10.4)
Average precipitation mm (inches)	11.4 (0.45)	6.8 (0.27)	4.3 (0.17)	4.8 (0.19)	15.2 (0.60)	68.7 (2.70)	134.1 (5.28)	128.4 (5.06)	84.6 (3.33)	45.1 (1.78)	13.5 (0.53)	12.6 (0.50)	529.5 (20.85)
Average precipitation days (≥ 1 mm)	1.5	1.1	0.6	0.7	2.2	7.4	13.9	13.4	9.5	4.2	1.3	1.6	61.4
Average relative humidity (%)	51	44	38	34	33	46	64	66	65	57	53	53	52
Mean monthly sunshine hours	227.5	240.6	292.1	278.4	298.2	257.5	228.5	226.3	210.7	259.5	252.7	226.1	2,998
Source 1: Servicio Meteorologico Nacional
Source 2: World Meteorological Organization (relative humidity and sun 1981–2010)Servicio Meteorológico Nacional

== The municipality ==
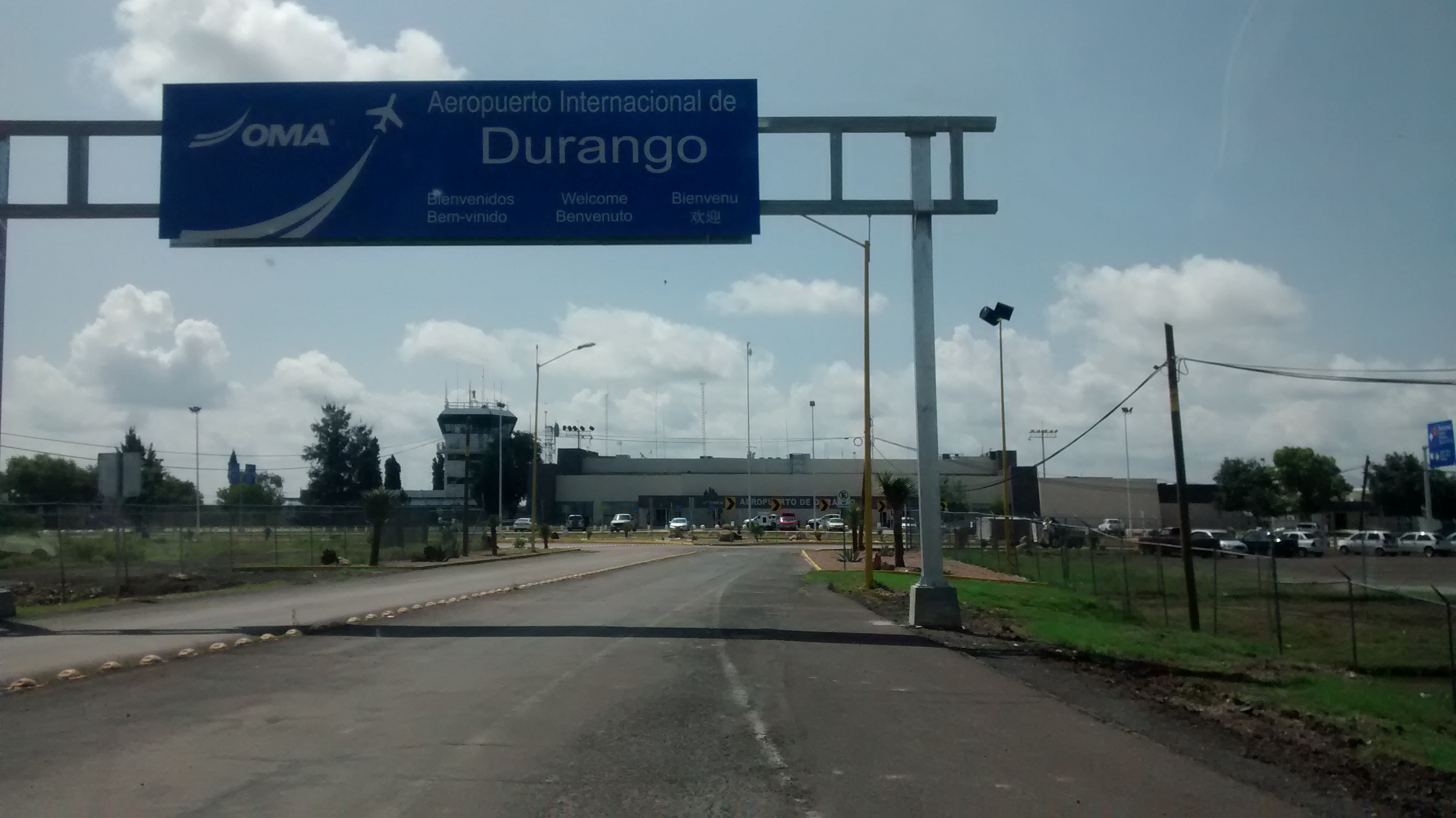
The Durango International Airport

The city of Durango is the local government for 481 other communities, spread out over an area of 9,259.71 km^{2} or 3,575.19 sq mi. The municipal government consists of a municipal president, a syndicate and seventeen representatives called regidores. As of 2015, the municipality had a population of 654,876 and was one of 39 in the state.

It is divided into two regions, with mountain ranges in the west and valleys in the east. Most of the municipality is covered in forests. Wildlife includes deer, wildcats, coyotes, hares, rabbits and ducks. The climate is temperate. In the western mountains, the average annual temperature is 15 °C or 59 °F with an average rainfall of 1,600 mm or 63 in. In the east, the average annual temperature is 19 °C or 66.2 °F with precipitation of about 600 mm or 24 in.

Most of the municipality's economy is dependent on agriculture, especially the eastern valleys. Water sources include the Tunal, La Sauceda, and Santiago Bayacora River on which there are several reservoirs: Guadalupe Victoria, the Pena de Aguila and the Santiago Bayacora, which also serve as recreational areas. There are also deposits of marble and onyx, along with various kinds of stone suitable for construction purposes.

== Landmarks ==
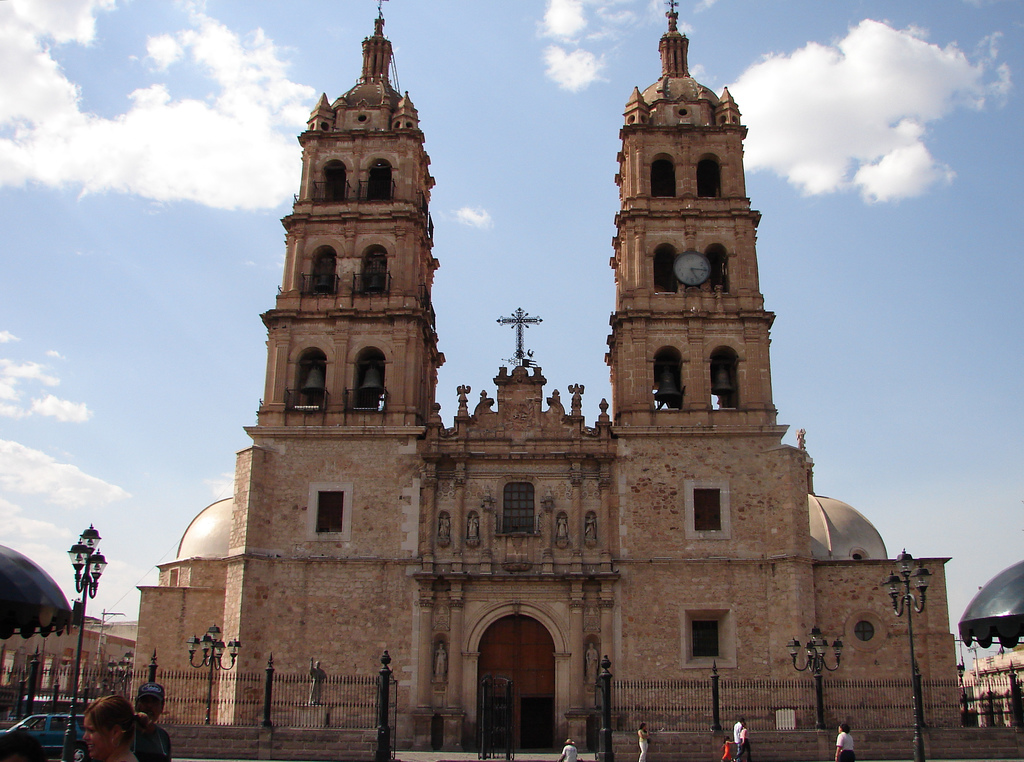
Catedral Basílica de Durango, Durango's Cathedral

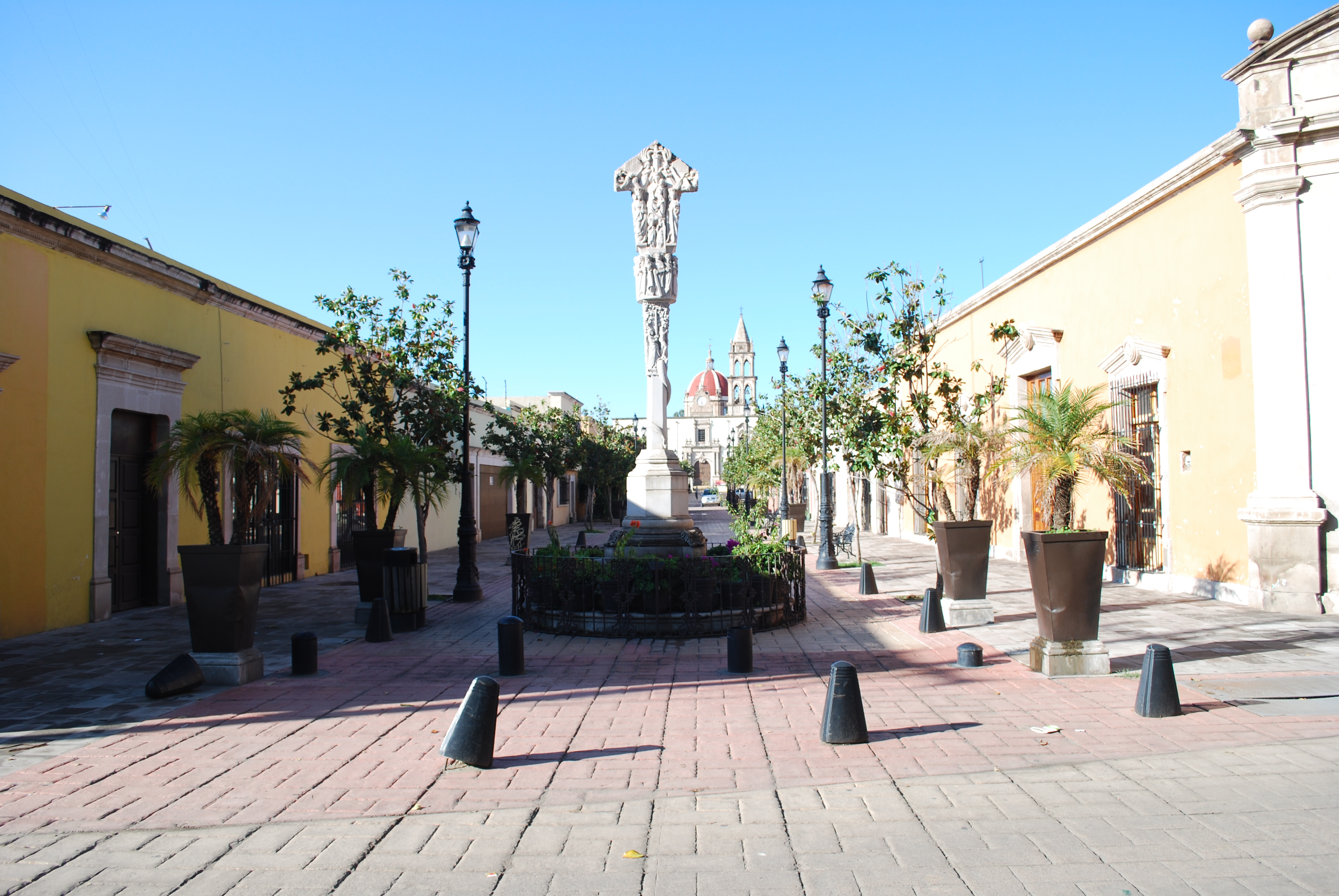
Paseo Analco

The city is noted for its colonial architecture, including Baroque, attesting to its relatively early colonization by the Spanish. The historic center contains the largest concentration of historic monuments in northern Mexico. The historic area of the city centers on the Cathedral and Plaza de Armas, with Paseo Constitución as the main pedestrian thoroughfare connecting the Hidalgo Garden in the north to the Paseo de las Alamedas in the south.

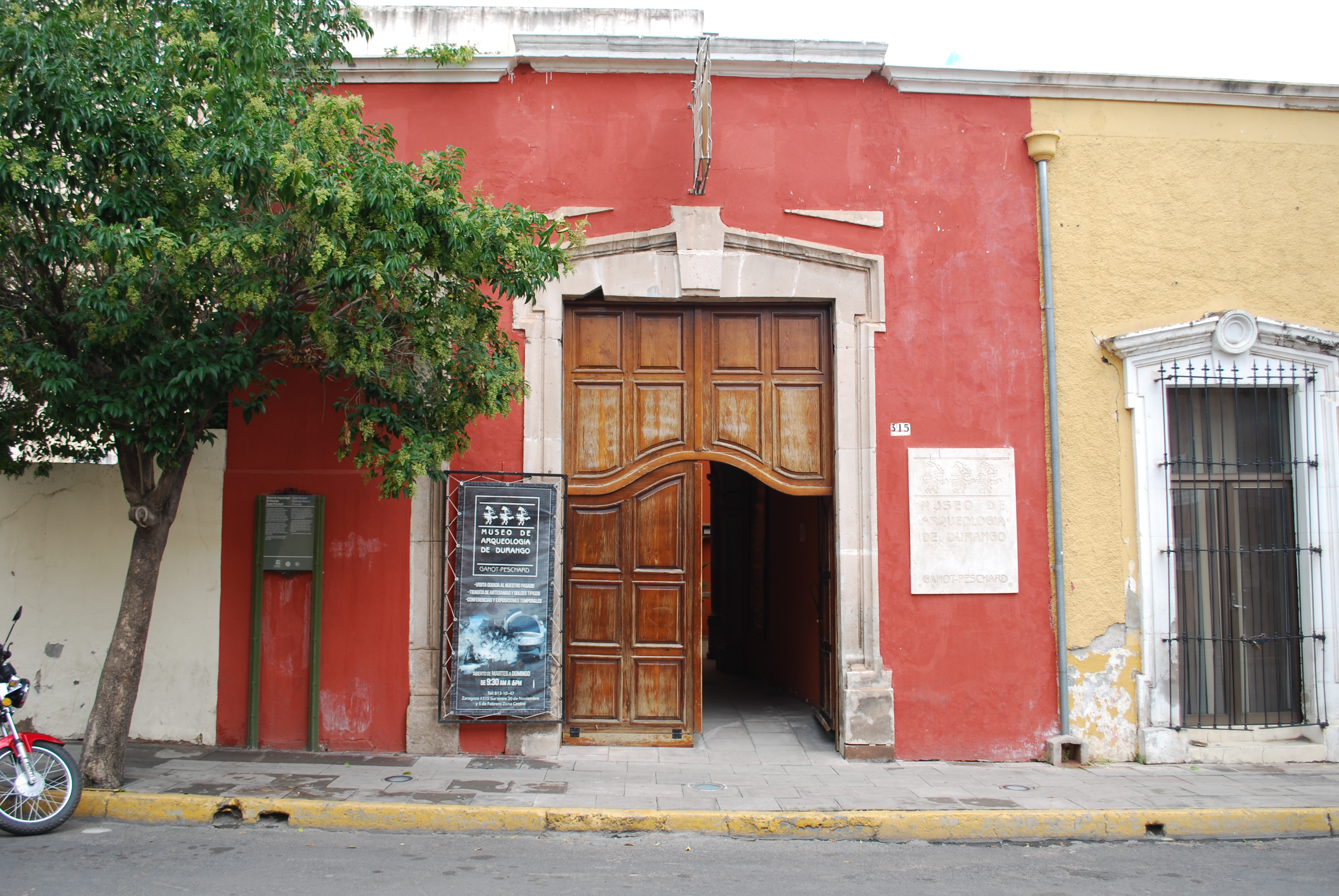
Ganot-Peschard Museum of Archeology

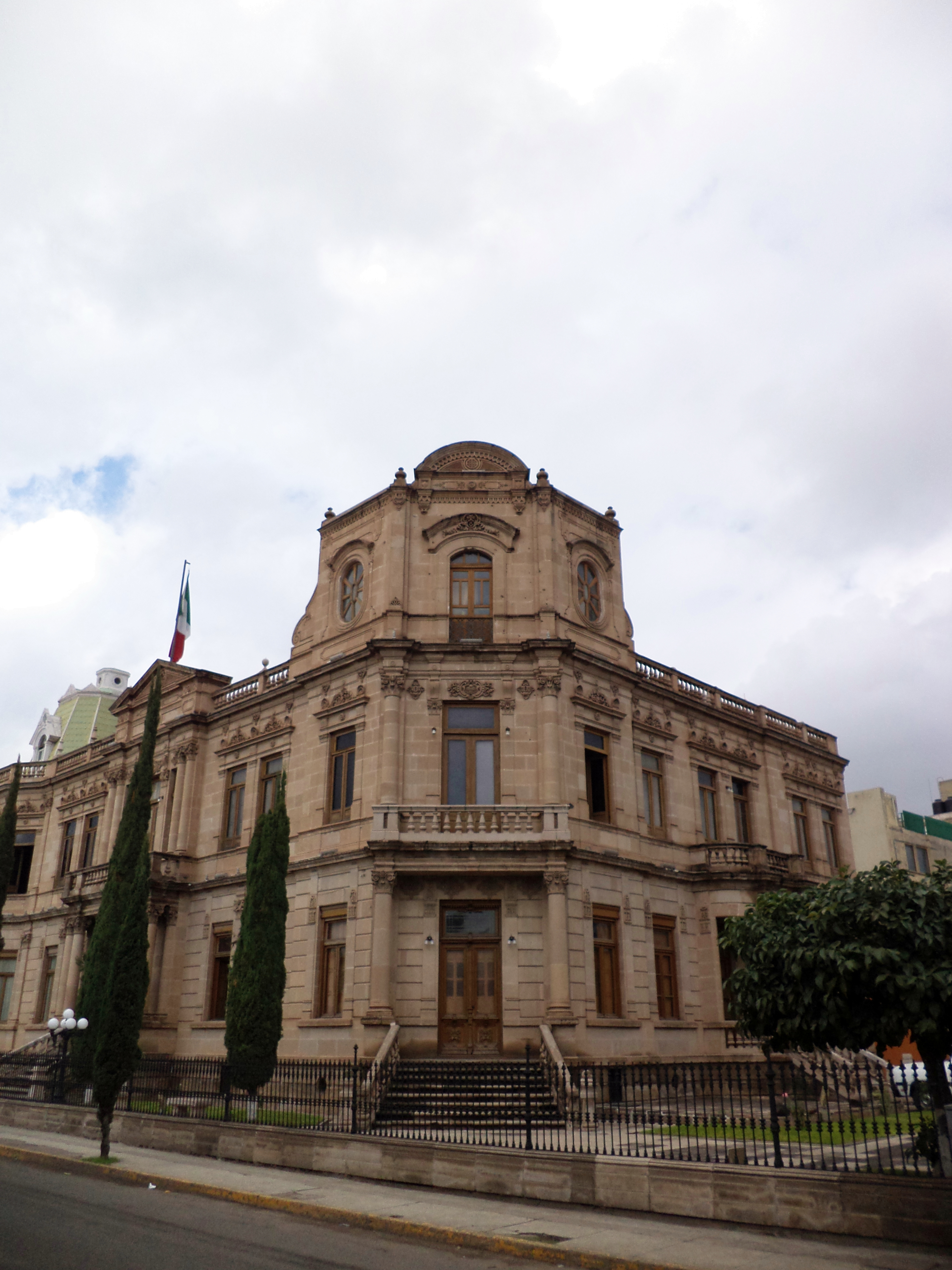
Quinta del Aguacate, Regional Museum of Durango

The Cathedral Basilica of Durango was founded as the Chapel of the Immaculate Conception in the early colonial period. It became the cathedral in 1621, but the building burned shortly thereafter in 1634. It was rebuilt in the middle of the 18th century at the height of the city's mining prosperity, but only a quarter of the construction from that period remains. The church remains dedicated to the Immaculate Conception, which is depicted on the main altar. It also contains Byzantine vaults and a cupola with paintings of angels. Underneath the cathedral runs the Mining Tunnel, also known as the Cathedral Tunnel. It was a mining shaft which also doubled as a secret passage. Today, it is a museum.

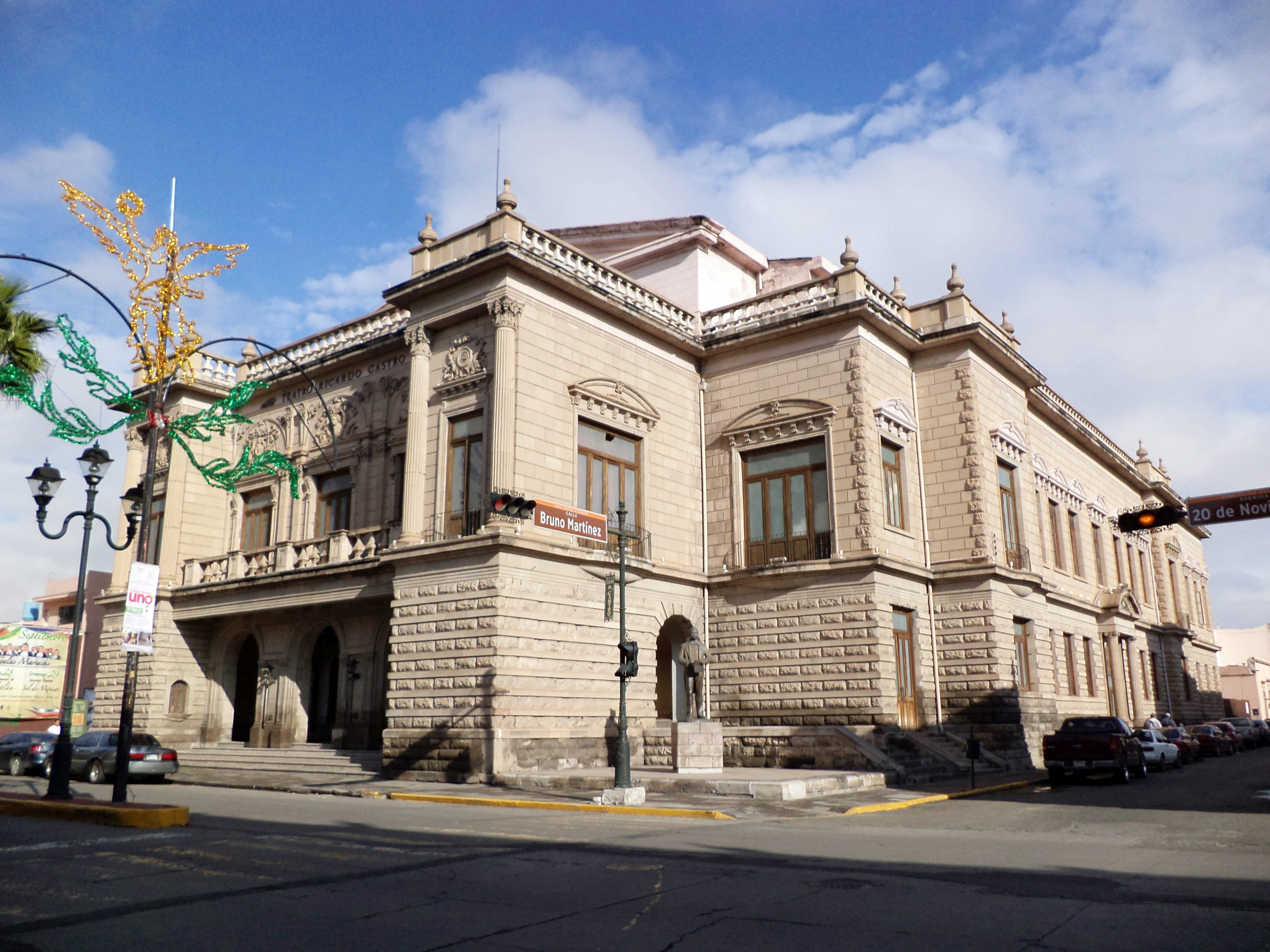
Ricardo Castro Theatre

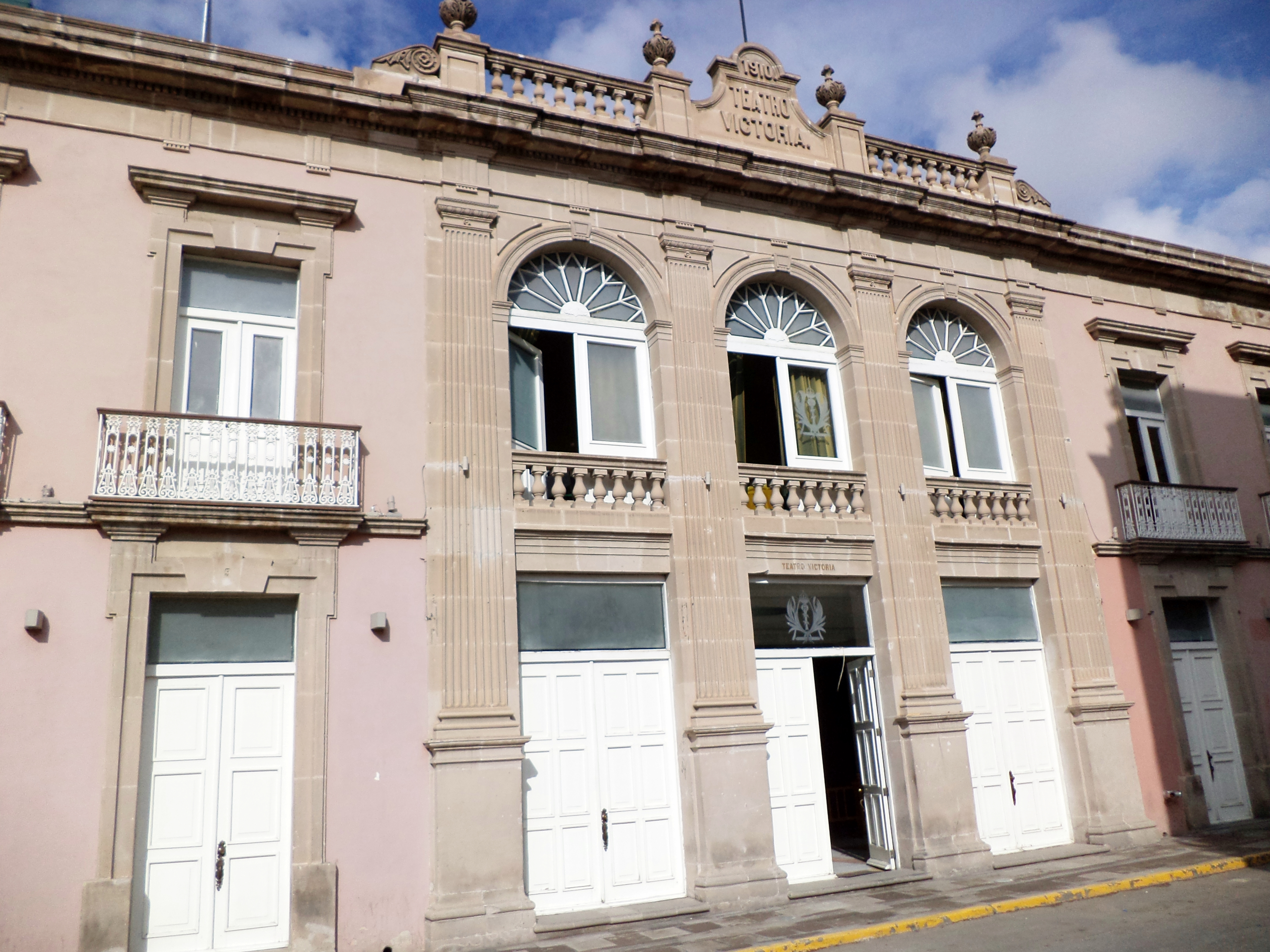
Victoria Theatre

The cathedral faces the city's main square, which is called the Plaza de Armas, which was established with the official founding of the city. The center contains a kiosk made from pink sandstone. The kiosk contains a shop dedicated to selling handicrafts made by students of the School of Painting, Sculpture and Crafts.

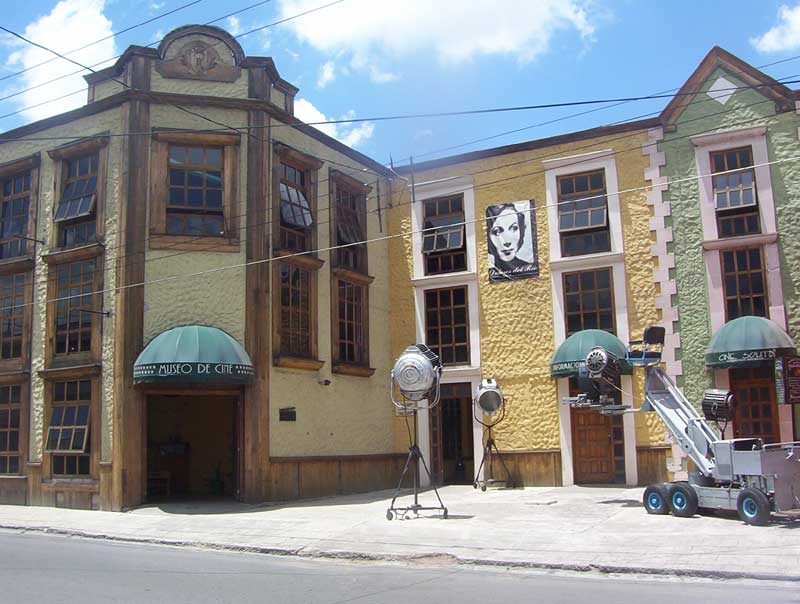
Cinema Museum

Mercado Gómez Palacio is the oldest market in the city for more than 200 years and continues to sell the typical green produce, candles, typical clothing, sombreros, keys, hardware, flowers, jewelry, and bicycle repair services.

The Ganot-Peschard Museum of Archeology was inaugurated in 1998 with the aim of preserving the region's indigenous archeological heritage. It is recognized as a historical monument by the National Institute of Anthropology and History.

There are several historically important churches in the city. The Guadalupe Sanctuary is located northwest of the historic center. It was constructed between 1653 and 1658 by Bishop Barrientos Lomelín originally as a guest house. The Remedios Church (Templo de los Remedios) is found on a hill of the same name overlooking the city from the west. It was built in 1640 and is one of the oldest churches in the state. Later churches include the San Agustin Church, which is Neoclassical with a rose window; Our Lady of Angels church, which was finished in 1897 featuring stonework by Benigno Montoya and the Sacred Heart Church built in Neo Romantic style.

The Regional Museum of Durango is located in the El Aguacate Building located on the corner of Victoria and Aquiles Serdán. This structure was built in French style which was popular at the end of the 19th century. The building originally was the residence of Francisco Gómez Palacio, who was governor of the state in 1880. It is in French style and has a garden with an avocado tree, which gives the building its nickname. The museum has twelve halls related to the history of the state and its natural resources. The permanent collection consists of over 1,000 objects, from the first cultures of Durango to modern times.

The State Government Palace is located in the former residence built by captain and miner Juan José Zambrano between 1790 and 1800. It acquired this function after the War of Independence. The original interior is Baroque, but it also contains more recent murals related to Mexico's Independence and the state's history, especially in the main stairwell. More recent remodeling in 2010 saw the installation of the Francisco Villa Museum, Villa being a native of Durango. It was opened in part in homage to those who abandon their hometowns to migrate elsewhere, with a mural on this topic.

The Founders' Plaza (Plaza de los Fundadores) is located near the State Government Palace and next to the former Jesuit College. It marks the place where the city was officially founded, with a sculpted mural depicting the event. It also contains a Mirror Monument and a fountain where children play on hot days. The old Jesuit College is now the Central Building of the Universidad Juárez de Durango. The building was constructed in the 18th century, but the order was expelled from Mexico not long after. Since then it had several uses before becoming the university.

The Count Suchil House (Casa del Conde de Súchil) was constructed between 1761 and 1768 by Governor Agüero and then later purchased by José del Campo Soberón y Larrea, the first Count of the Vaelly of Suchil. The facade is Baroque and is attributed to the same architect who designed the sides of the cathedral.

Constructed between 1798 and 1800, the Victoria Theater is the oldest theatre in the north of Mexico. It was originally built as part of the Zambrano residence as the owner's personal theater with the name of the Coliseo Theater. It inaugurated in 1800 with a play by Euripides. Later it was renamed the Main Theater (Teatro Principal). In 1908, it was bought by Jesús Ávila, who reconstructed it in 1909 adding ironwork, boxes and the four levels it now has. It gained its current name with the centennial of Mexico's independence. The theater was used as a cinema from 1926 to 1978, when the Mary Street Foundation donated it to the state with the aim of returning it to theatrical use.

The City Museum (Museo de la Ciudad) was until recently the municipal government building. The structure was built in the 19th century, but contains many elements from the architecture of the previous century. It originally was called the Escárzaga Palace, the residence of mine owner Pedro Escárzaga Corral. The building is of lime and sandstone on the exterior walls with the interior paved with adobe and stone. The current tile floors are a recent addition. The roof is of reinforced concrete, which replaced the previous one made of packed earth and wood beams. Only the main terrace is left completely intact in its original condition. The building was a copy of a hotel in France. The building currently contains a mural of the city's history done by Francisco Montoya de la Cruz in 1954. From 1930 to 2008, it served as the municipal hall, when it was converted to its current museum status. The museum has a collection of movie posters, film scenes and equipment.

The Ricardo Castro Theater was inaugurated on 27 March 1925, with the name of Theater in Construction. The building is in a French style with the facade stonework done by Benigno Montoya. The murals are by Octavo Rios.

The Angel Zarraga Contemporary Art Museum was inaugurated in 1994 with a permanent collection of paintings and sculptures. It also gives workshops in various disciplines.

The Durango Folk Culture Museum (Museo de las Culturas Populares de Durango) showcases the indigenous and non-indigenous ethnicities of the territory. It contains five halls, mostly dedicated to handcrafts and other implements used in farm and other forms of rural life, such as tools, textiles, basketry and pottery. It also contains temporary exhibits, especially of winners from the state's annual handcrafts competition.

The Book Museum is an open space dedicated to the evolution of the book as part of the State Public Library. It also has a collection of other recording media including clay tablets, papyrus, and modern technology.

The city has two museums geared toward young people. El Bebeleche is an interactive children's museum, with exhibits concentrated in science and technology. The Acertijo Museum is also an interactive museum with exhibits in science and culture.

The main green area in the city is the Guadiana Park, which contains the Teatro del Pueblo. Guadiana Park contains sports facilities such as running and cycling tracks. It has fountains, the Auditorio del Pueblo and a mural by Manual Salas Ceniceros. Next to this park is the Sahuatoba Park and Zoo which contains a shell stage constructed in the 1980s. It contains a "miniature" version of the Baluarte suspension bridge, part of the highway that links the city with Mazatlan. The Paseo de Alamedas lines part of the southern edge of the city historic center, in part separating it from the Analco neighborhood. The park is lined with willows and poplars along with sculptures and areas for temporary exhibitions.

The Analco neighborhood is one of the most traditional in the city. It is centered on its parish dedicated to John the Baptist and originally was a mission. The current building was constructed in the 18th century. The altar and towers were created by Benigno Montoya in 1908. The original bridge that connects the neighborhood with the Paseo de las Alamedas was constructed in 1795, but it was more recently reconstruction as a pedestrian walkway.

The old train station is in French style built at the end of the 19th century. It appears in many movies that were shot here in the 20th century.

The Hacienda de la Ferrería de Flores is about 8 km south of the city proper near the Cerro de la Ferrería mountain. The main house has been completely restored to what it was in the 19th century. It was an industrial hacienda dedicated to the production of iron. The site contains the most important archeological ruins in the state, with pyramidal structures and artifacts dating back over 2,000 years. It was built by a small agricultural society that lived off of corn, beans and squash, along with hunting and gathering.

The Durango Cultural Complex (Conjunto Cultural Durango) was originally the Juana Villalobos Hospital. It was constructed in 1899, but by 1911 had become a military barracks then a prison. The cultural center is run by the state government.

The La Familia pedestrian bridge crosses Felipe Pescador Boulevard, one of the busiest in the city due to the various malls and shopping centers in this area. The bridge is distinguished by a series of sculptures which mimic profiles of the human face. At night, various lights change the colors of these sculptures.

The Plaza Hito or 450 Garden contains sculptures of stylized oak trees in white. At night, these are illuminated with colored lights which shine off the structures as well as the accompanying fountains.

The Bicentennial Mural is a high relief sculpture depicting the history of the state in nine sections. It is part of the Bicentennial Convention and Cultural Center, all established to celebrate Mexico's 200 years of independence. The center was established on a complex of buildings dating from the 19th century.

== Culture and contemporary life ==
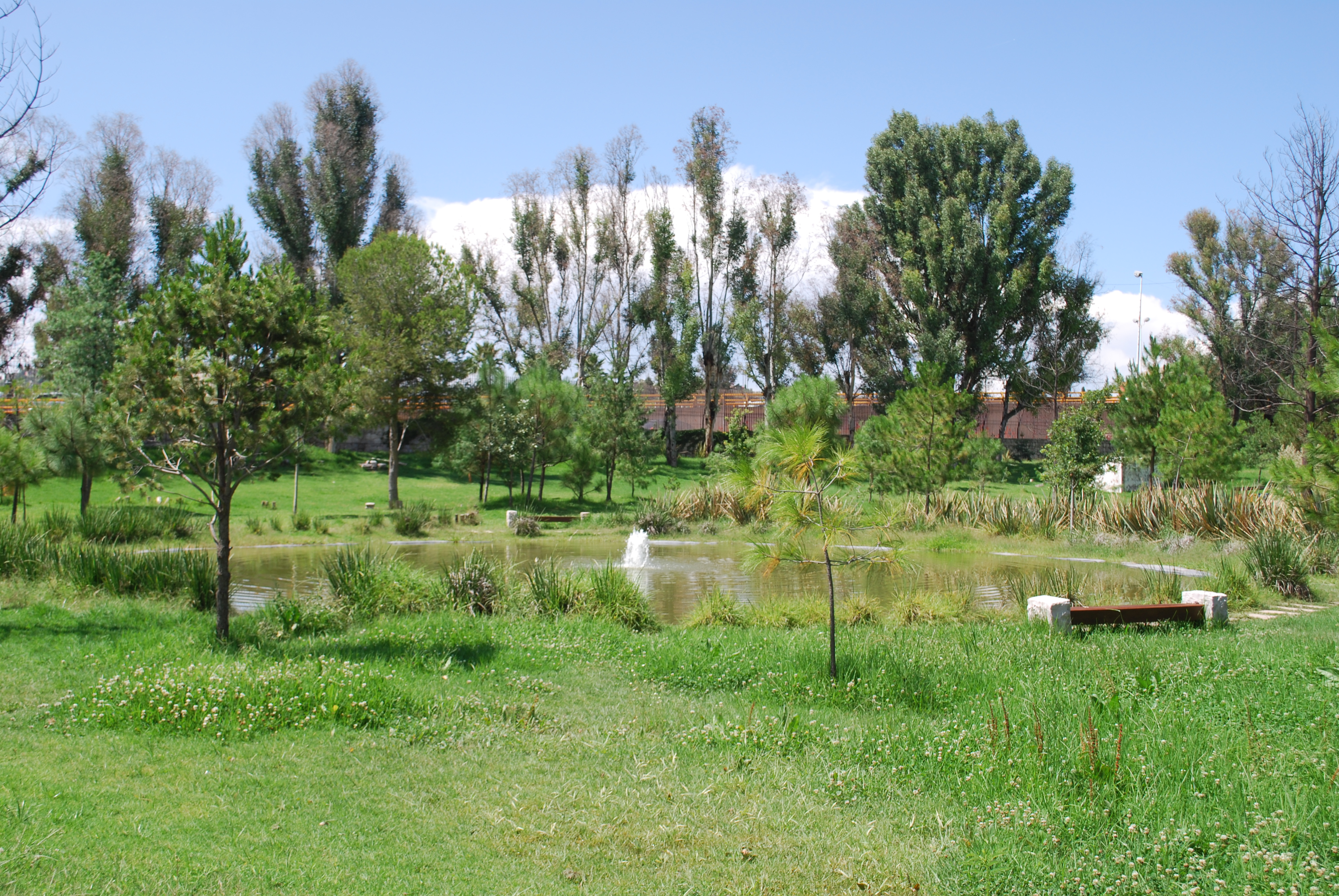
Guadiana Park

The patron saint of the city is Saint George, whose feast day is 23 April, celebrated by offerings of flowers and candles. An image of the saint can be found in the cathedral. His veneration is one of the most important manifestations of popular religion in the area. He became the saint by declaration of Bishop Pedro Barrientos Lomelín to protect the population from threats such as scorpion stings.

Like many parts of Mexico, the city has an annual Passion Play for Holy Week. The procession was reinstated as a public spectacle in the mid 20th century.

The Durango National Fair is held each year for 15 days around 8 July to commemorate the city's founding. It begins with a parade of floats and horseback riders, and the selection of the fair queen. Activities include sporting and cultural events such as football, baseball, dance, food, plays, concerts, exhibitions, and showings of agricultural and industrial products in different parts of the city. The fairgrounds are located on the highway that connects the city with neighboring Mezquital.

The Revueltas Festival is named after a family noted for their cultural contributions to the city. It is held at the Victoria Theater with events related to music, literature and dance.

The Ricardo Castro Festival is named after composer and pianist Ricardo Castro, a native of the city of Durango. It offers over 100 events in various artistic disciplines, especially book presentations, literary workshops, concerts, dance, and theater.

Beef is the primary meat as it is culturally part of the north of the country. Cheese is an important ingredient, made in several small towns in the area. Cold winters and a history of no refrigeration prompted the development of food preservation techniques, including canning, jam, and other preserves, and dried foods such as jerky and chili peppers. Typical dishes include barbacoa, meat in mole sauce (which tend to be sweet), and caldillo Duranguense. Caldillo Durangueño was originally made with deer meat and green chili peppers (poblanos), but today is made with beef. Another popular dish is asado rojo, made with pork. However, the most emblematic dish is the gordita, where thick corn (sometimes flour) tortillas are split then stuffed with one of several different savory fillings. Its popularity stems from its historical role as a food taken into the fields to eat. Traditional sweets here are similar to those in other parts of Mexico, introduced by nuns from convents further south and include crystallized fruits and cajeta (dulce de leche). The most important alcoholic drink is mezcal as the state is one of several in the country with denomination of origin.

=== Healthcare ===
At the beginning of November 2022, Durango health authorities reported an outbreak of meningitis in patients attending private hospitals, who had had surgeries using spinal anesthesia, the cause of which remained unknown. In December 2022, the Institute of Epidemiological Diagnosis and Reference (Instituto de Diagnóstico y Referencia Epidemiológicos, InDRE) confirmed Fusarium species in the cerebrospinal fluid of two cases. On 24 November 2022, the Secretariat of Health reported that several medications were put in preventive quarantine; on 30 November Fusarium solani had been detected in two patients, and by December 8, no Fusarium had been identified yet in any of the batches of the medications. Most affected patients were women (96%) between 25–29 years, who underwent gynecological-obstetric procedures. Four hospitals had been closed. By 6 February 2023, 79 meningitis cases, of which 35 were fatal, had occurred with new cases appearing "nearly every day". 34 of the fatalities were in women who had undergone cesarean section. The next day, El Pais reported that contamination of four batches of bupivacaine used by an anesthesiologist were contaminated with Fusarium solani.

=== Media ===
The city has various local radio and television stations. Radio stations include Los 40 Principales Durango, La Tremenda, and Radio X. Television stations operating locally in Durango are XHDRG-TV, XHDI-TV, XHDB-TV, XHA-TV and XHND-TV.

=== Retail markets ===
The main market of the city is the eclectic Mercado de Abastos Francisco Villa located in the southern-central portion of the city which houses candy shops, Mesoamerican pottery, jewelry, haberdasheries, and it is the city's largest supplier of wholesale produce, dairy, and meats.

Durango's main and first official shopping mall is Paseo Durango with anchor stores such as Liverpool and Suburbia as well as chain and independent eateries. Paseo Durango also includes a movie theatre and offers banking services and various recreational activities.

The city of Durango also has numerous shops and boutiques that offer a variety products and goods. The city has stand-alone supermarkets from chains and independent grocers.

== Business ==
According to the World Bank for doing business, Durango is ranked 7 out of 32 cities in Mexico at ease of doing business. The ranking is based on four different categories, starting a business, dealing with construction permits, registration of a property, and enforcing contracts. According to these categories, Durango is ranked 23 in starting a business, 5 in dealing with construction permits, 15 in registrations of property and 8 in enforcing contracts.

=== Sports ===
Popular sports in Durango are baseball, softball, football, and basketball. In football, the city has a Second Division team named Alacranes de Durango (Durango Scorpions), In basketball, the city is the home of the Durango Lumberjacks basketball team (in Spanish Leñadores de Durango) who play in the Auditorio del Pueblo Gym. They also have a minor league team named los Alacranes de Beisbol (English; Durango Baseball Scorpions), having a rivalry with the Dorados de Chihuahua, and a semi-professional softball team.

In American football, there is a semi-professional team named Centuriones de Durango playing in the AFAS Master League and a college football team, the ITD Burros Blancos, playing in the northerner conference of the ONEFA.

== Demographics ==
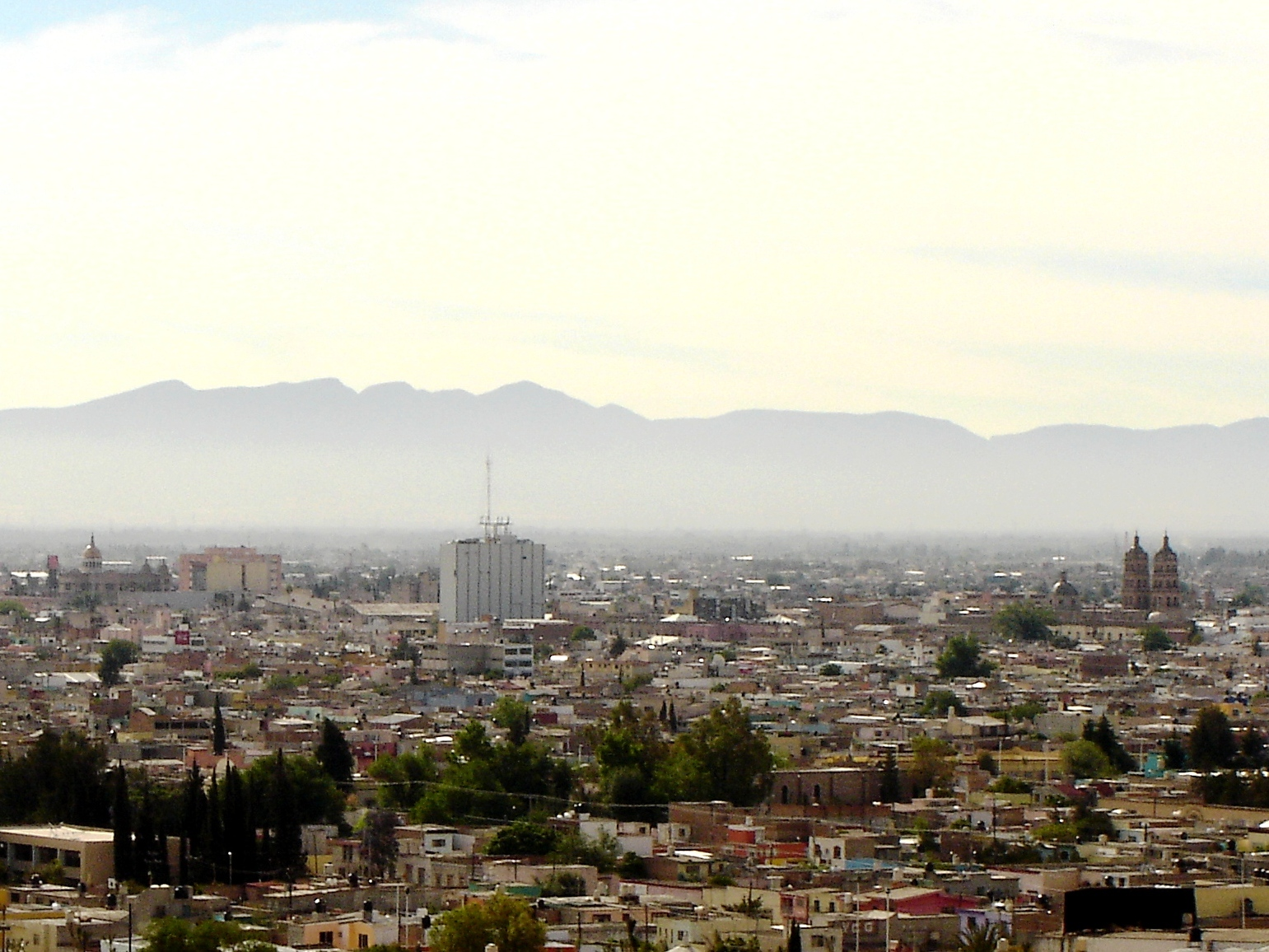
City of Durango

According to the 2014 census, there were 565,300 people in the city and 654,876 in the municipality. The ethnic composition of the city is 52% White, 44% Mestizo, 4% Arabs, and less than 1% Indigenous. The majority of Duranguenses, like many northern Mexicans, have European origins, with most of them being Criollos.

During the late 19th and early 20th centuries, there were small immigration waves to northern and central Mexico from Europe and the Middle East. Most immigrants to the city arrived from Spain (mainly from the Basque Country. There were also some waves from France, Italy, Ireland, Germany, the Netherlands, and Sweden.

There were also immigration waves during World War II from Eastern Europe, (mainly Russians and Poles) and from the Balkans (especially from Macedonia and Montenegro). Romanians and Ukrainians arrived during the 1990s and most of them reside in immigrant ghettos in the inner city.

There are roughly 10,000 Plautdietsch-speaking Mennonites living in the municipality of Durango. Durango also has recent retiree communities from Australia, the United States, and South Africa.

Many post-colonial Spanish immigrants were from Galicia (Galicians). The Galician language, cuisine and culture had a major presence in the city for most of the 20th century. In recent years, descendants of Galician immigrants have led a mini-boom in Celtic music.

The Arab and Armenian communities have had a significant presence in commerce and civic life since the beginning of the 20th century. Asians represent smaller communities and number about 1–2% of the city's population; most of them are Japanese while smaller numbers are Chinese and Koreans, the latter known in the city for owning family-style supermarkets.

=== Religion ===
The majority of the city, like the rest of Mexico, is predominantly Roman Catholic. Protestants make up less than 10% of the population, most of them are Charismatics. There are also large numbers of Jehovah's Witnesses and Latter-Day Saints, Jews and Orthodox Christians represent smaller communities of about 1,000 each. Muslims in the state number about 5,000–7,000 with most of them living in Victoria de Durango. Durango is the centre of the diocese of Durango which was erected in 1620 and became an archdiocese in 1891. Originally it covered all of Northern Mexico and much of what is today in the United States. The current archbishop is José Antonio Fernández Hurtado. The estimated Catholic population is 1,124,237 or 93.3% of the population.

== Economy ==
The city of Durango is the capital and economic center of a state that is mostly dependent on agriculture and livestock, with a high level of socioeconomic marginalization. It is by far the largest and most populated urban center in the state. More locally, the economy revolves around forestry and foreign factories that have set up shop here.

There have been efforts to develop a tourism industry here. Most visitors to the city visit the historic center, especially the cathedral, main plaza, the old railroad stations, parks and museums. Other attractions include haciendas, local natural areas and movie sets, some of which are now theme attractions. In 2010, the city built a suspended cable car similar to those found in Chihuahua and Zacatecas, which allows for panoramic views of the city as it climbs to the Cerro de los Remedios.

There are highways connecting the city to Zacatecas (and into the center of the country), Torreón to the north, Nayarit to the south and a new major highway west to Mazatlán. General Guadalupe Victoria Airport receives both national and international flights: six per day from Mexico City, one per day from Guadalajara, Tijuana and Monterrey as well as flights from Chicago, Los Angeles, Houston, and Dallas/Fort Worth (beginning in June 2019). However, only one airline, Aeroméxico, connects the city with the nation's capital.

Though nothing like its heyday in the mid-to-late 20th century, the city and the surrounding area still attracts film projects, especially for works with a Western theme, with over 120 films shot here since the industry started. The area contains sets built for this purpose including Calle Howard, Western Village and Rancho Calderón, all with reproductions of wood buildings like those found in the Old West of the United States. The city proper has provided backdrops of Old Mexico. Several old sets have been converted into theme parks, including Chupaderos, Villas de Oeste and La Joya, John Wayne's old ranch.

There are several bus lines, including Omnibus de Mexico, Mexico Omnibus Plus, Tourists Luxury, Executive Senda AVE, North Transport, Transport North Premier, Futura, Transport Chihuahuenses, Mexico Interstate Bus (ELITE). Along with local lines, these are located at the city's bus terminal, General Domingo Arrieta.

Within the city, taxicabs are available. Durango is one of the cities with the lowest taxi rates in the country.

== Education ==
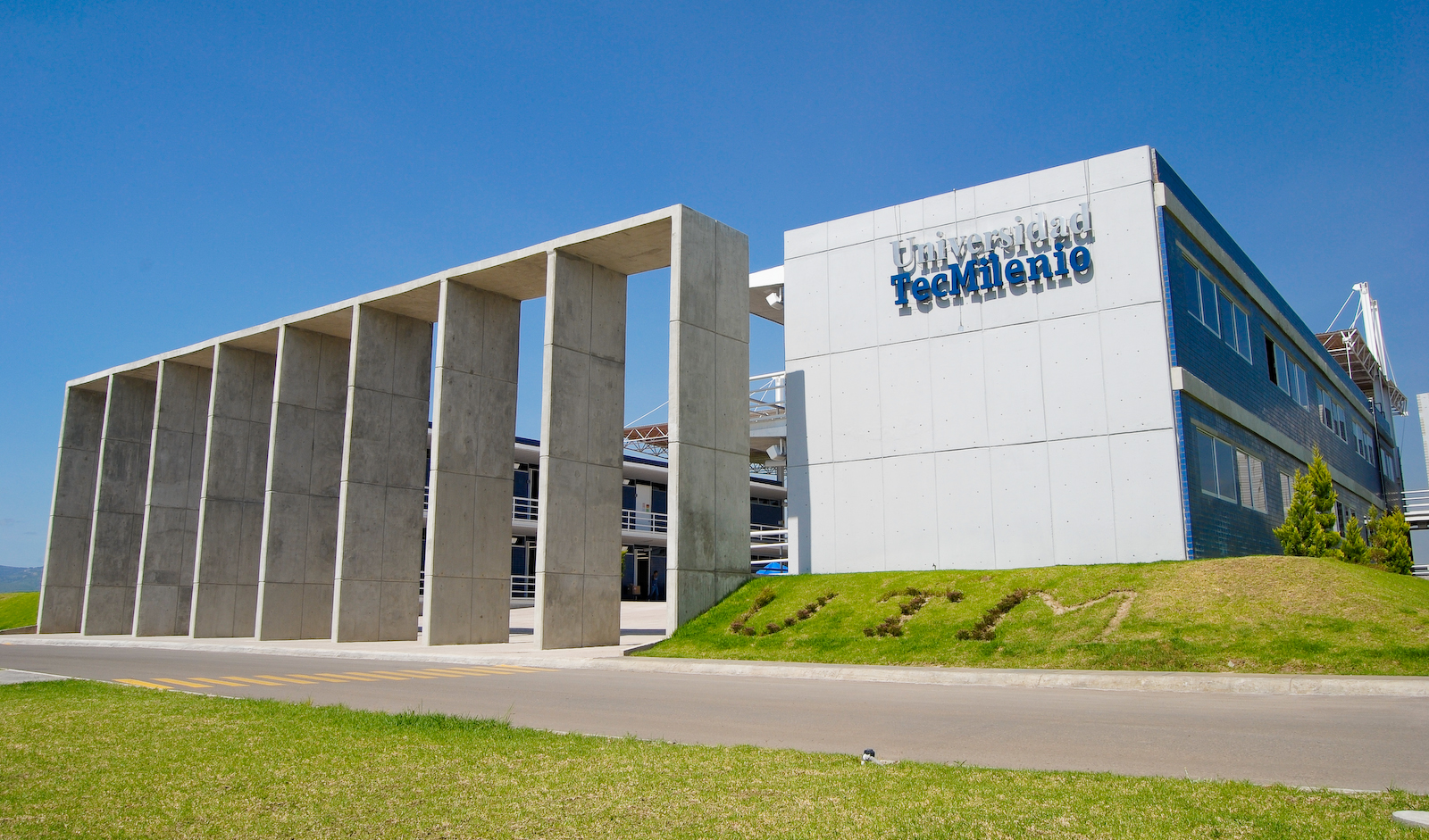
The private TecMilenio University has a Durango campus.

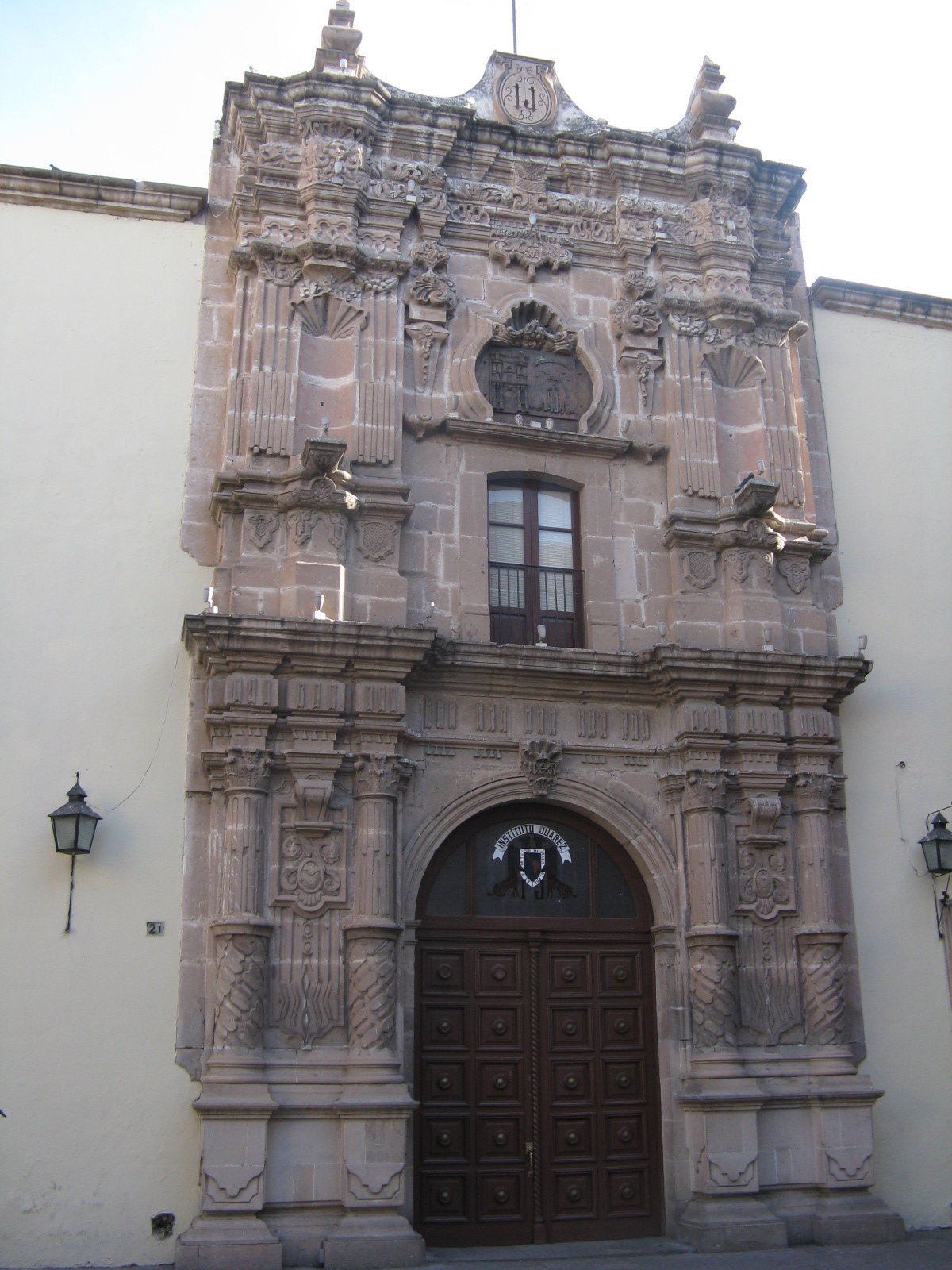
Juárez University is in the State of Durango.

The municipality has adequate facilities to provide preschool, elementary, middle and upper secondary, undergraduate, and graduate education. The higher education institutions within the city are:

- Universidad Politécnica de Durango
- Universidad Tecnológica de Durango
- Universidad Autónoma de Durango
- Universidad TecMilenio (TecMilenio University Durango Campus)
- Universidad España de Durango
- Universidad Del Valle de Guadiana
- Universidad Juárez del Estado de Durango
- Universidad José Vasconcelos
- Universidad Autónoma de Guadalajara
- Instituto Universitario Anglo Español
- Instituto Alejandría
- Instituto Tecnológico Forestal
- Instituto Tecnológico de Durango
- Centro Pedagógico de Durango, A.C.
- Centro Universitario Promedac
- Escuela de Odontología
- Escuela de Ciencias Químicas
- Escuela Superior de Música
- Facultad de Medicina
- Facultad de Medicina, Veterinaria y Zootecnia
- Facultad de Enfermería y Obstetricia
- Facultad de Contaduría y Administración
- Facultad de Derecho

The city has numerous foreign and international educational institutions for the children of immigrants, including:

- Alianza Francesa de Durango
- Colegio Alemán Alexander von Humboldt
- American School of Durango
- Assured English Academy
- Academia Griega de Durango - Ελληνική Ακαδημία
- Liceo de Rusia - Русский лицей

== Transportation ==
The city is served by Durango International Airport, with service on four commercial passenger airlines, including American Airlines to the United States.

== Notable people ==
- Francisco Castillo Nájera
- Dolores del Río
- René Elizondo Jr.
- Marlene Favela
- Dolores Guerrero
- Ricardo Moreno
- Ramón Novarro
- Andrea Palma (actress)
- The Revueltas family: José Revueltas, Rosaura Revueltas, Silvestre Revueltas, Fermín Revueltas Sánchez
- Angelica Salas
- Guadalupe Victoria
- Pancho Villa
- Juan Bautista Ceballos, president of Mexico from January 6 to February 8,1853

== Twin towns and sister cities ==
Victoria de Durango is twinned with:

- Durango, Spain
- Durango, Colorado, United States
- Franklin Park, United States
- Ningbo, China
- Sacaba, Bolivia
- Vigo, Spain
