= XHND-TDT =

TV station in Durango, Durango, Mexico

- Durango, Durango; Mexico
- Channels: Digital: 30 (UHF); Virtual: 12
- Branding: Canal 12 Durango

Ownership
- Owner: NTR Medios de Comunicación; (Radio Cañón, S.A. de C.V.)

History
- Founded: June 13, 1981
- Former call signs: XHND-TV (1981–2015)
- Former channel numbers: 12 (analog VHF; 1981–2015)

Technical information
- Licensing authority: CRT
- ERP: 14 kW
- Transmitter coordinates: 24°01′16″N 104°40′52″W

Links
- Website: canal12dgo.com

XHND-TDT is a television station in Durango, in the state of Durango, Mexico. The station broadcasts on virtual channel 12.

Broadcasts start at 7:30 am and continue to midnight daily. The station broadcasts a news-heavy schedule with its own local news programs.

XHND came on the air June 13, 1981 on analog channel 12. It went digital-only on December 22, 2015.
