= Channel 12 virtual TV stations in Canada =

List of channels on virtual channel 12 in Canada

The following television stations operate on virtual channel 12 in Canada:

- CFCF-DT in Montreal, Quebec
- CFTF-DT-3 in Cabano, Quebec
- CHAU-DT-9 in L'Anse-à-Valleau, Quebec
- CHEX-DT in Peterborough, Ontario
- CHKL-DT-2 in Vernon, British Columbia
- CHNB-DT in Saint John, New Brunswick
- CIFG-DT in Prince George, British Columbia
- CIII-DT-12 in Sault Ste. Marie, Ontario
- CIVA-DT in Val d'Or, Quebec
- CIVF-DT in Sept-Iles, Quebec
- CKTV-DT in Saguenay, Quebec
