= Channel 12 (Misiones, Argentina) =

TV station in Posadas, Misiones Province, Argentina

LT 85 TV Canal 12
- Posadas, Misiones; Argentina
- Channels: Analog: 12 (VHF); Digital: 30 (UHF)
- Branding: Doce TV

Programming
- Affiliations: El Trece, Televisión Pública, El Nueve

Ownership
- Owner: Government of Misiones Province; (Multimedios S.A.P.E.M.)

History
- First air date: November 18, 1972

Technical information
- Licensing authority: ENACOM

Links
- Website: canal12misiones.com

Doce Misiones (call sign LT 85 TV) is an Argentine television station broadcasting from Posadas, Misiones to all the province and the south of Paraguay and Brazil. It is an independent station, with a few time-delayed Artear shows. Founded on 18 November 1972, the station produces a great deal of local programming.

== History ==
On September 8, 1969, by means of Decree 5067, the National Executive Power granted a license to the province to exploit VHF channel 12 in Posadas, capital of the province of Misiones. Until then, the city was served by a cable system, Ultravox, on channel 2.

The license started regular broadcasts on November 18, 1972 as LT 85 TV Canal 12 de Posadas.

== Local programming ==
The station produces around 60% of its schedule. The most important shows are:

- Muy Temprano - morning newscast
- 12 Noticias - afternoon and evening newscast
- Revista 12 - newsmagazine
- Medio Tiempo Deportivo - sportscast
- Caleidoscopio - children
- La Tele te Llama - game show
- Clase Turista - travel
- De la Tribuna - sports talk
- Recorriendo Alemania - travel
