= Canal 12 (Nicaragua) =

Television channel in Nicaragua

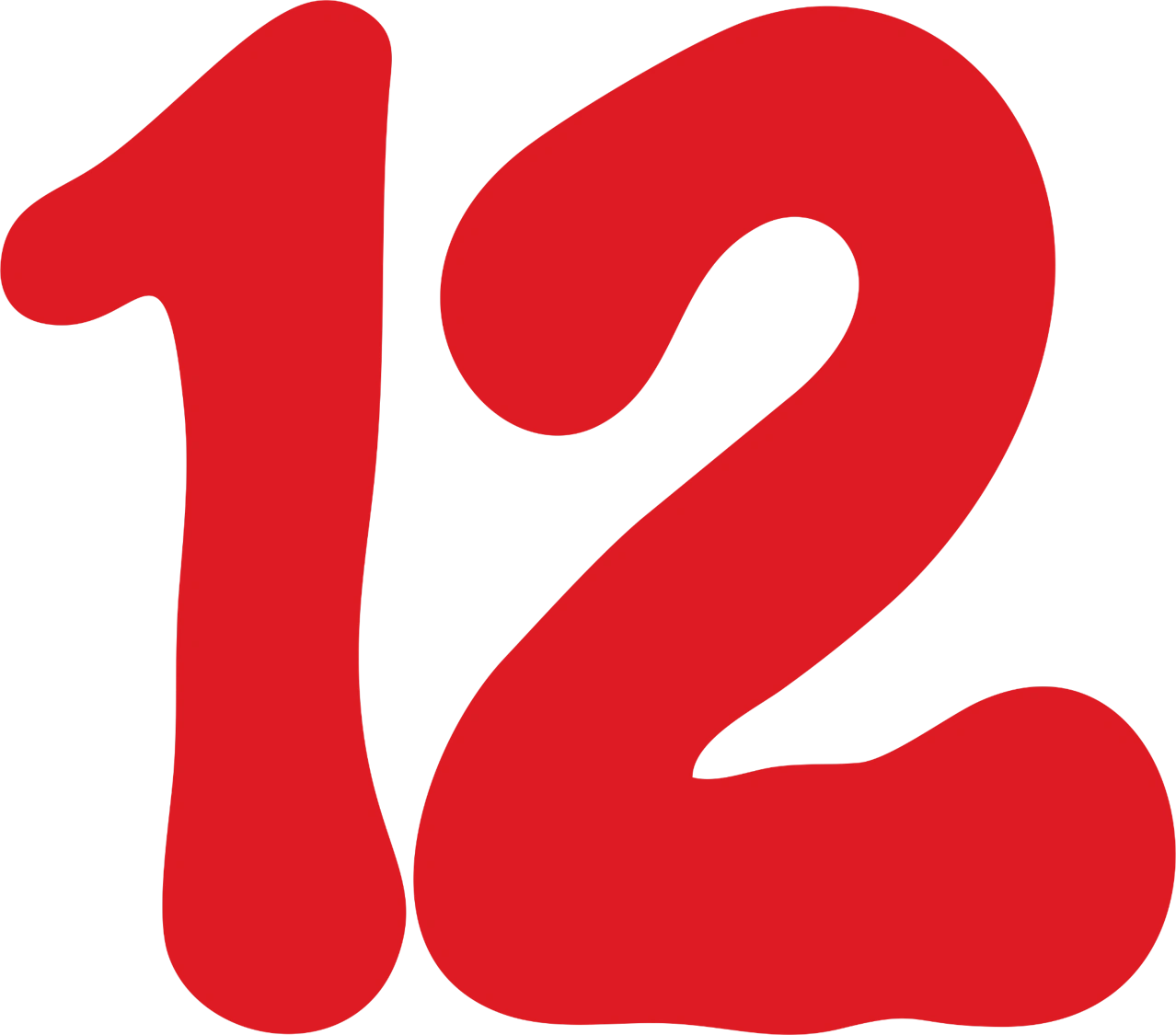
- Country: Nicaragua
- Broadcast area: Nicaragua
- Headquarters: Managua

Programming
- Language: Spanish
- Picture format: 480i SDTV

Ownership
- Owner: Nicavisión, S.A.

History
- Launched: December 11, 1994; 31 years ago

Links
- Website: canal12.com.ni

Availability

Terrestrial
- Analog VHF (Nicaragua): Channel 12 (Managua); Channel 5 (Inside the country)

Canal 12 is a national terrestrial television channel in Nicaragua owned by Nicavisión, S.A., a company of the Valle Peters family. It broadcasts from a main transmitter atop Las Nubes, a major broadcast television site for the Managua area, and from repeaters at Estelí, Matagalpa and Jinotega and Chinandega, all of which on channel 5. With these transmitters, its signal reaches the Pacific side of Nicaragua.

== History ==
Nicavisión was founded in 1993 and signed on the air December 11, 1994 by Mariano Valle. Valle had a television license as far back as 1960, on channel 3, which was never built due to the small size of the Nicaraguan television market (which at the time had two channels). Initial programming included Power Rangers, X-Men and telenovelas. In the middle of 1995, the station's news operation, Noticias 12, began.

Nicavisión is also the owner of a local network of radio stations, including Radio Amor, Radio Sonora, Estación X, Radio Magic and 106.7 FM.

During the 2018–2022 Nicaraguan protests, TELCOR, the broadcasting regulatory agency in Nicaragua, ordered cable providers to remove Canal 12 and several other stations that were providing news coverage of the demonstrations from their cable systems.

In early 2019, under threats from Telcor, the channel had to remove Esta noche, Esta semana and Danilo Lacayo en vivo; regarding the first two, its director Carlos Fernando Chamorro reported that his equipment was stolen and his facilities where the programs were produced were taken by the police for the simple act of reporting.

Danilo Lacayo, head of news of the channel and host of the program of his name, also had to leave the country due to threats from sympathizers of the Nicaraguan State.
