= Channel 12 low-power TV stations in the United States =

The following low-power television stations broadcast on digital or analog channel 12 in the United States:

- K12AK-D in Crested Butte, Colorado
- K12AL-D in Waunita Hot Springs, Colorado
- K12AV-D in Pateros/Mansfield, Washington
- K12BA-D in Winthrop-Twisp, Washington
- K12BE-D in Orondo, etc., Washington
- K12CV-D in Riverside, Washington
- K12CW-D in Malott/Wakefield, Washington
- K12CX-D in Tonasket, Washington
- K12DE-D in Lund & Preston, Nevada
- K12FB-D in Saco, Montana
- K12GP-D in Dodson, Montana
- K12JJ-D in Benbow, etc., California
- K12LA-D in Kenai, etc., Alaska
- K12LF-D in Coolin, Idaho
- K12LI-D in Thayne, etc., Wyoming
- K12LO-D in Ferndale, Montana
- K12LS-D in Challis, Idaho
- K12LU-D in West Glacier, etc., Montana
- K12LV-D in Dryden, Washington
- K12LX-D in Powderhorn, Colorado
- K12MD-D in Sleetmute, Alaska
- K12MI-D in Laketown, etc., Utah
- K12MM-D in Girdwood Valley, Alaska
- K12MS-D in Elko, Nevada
- K12MW-D in Manhattan, Nevada
- K12NH-D in Hobbs, New Mexico
- K12OC-D in Red River, New Mexico
- K12OF-D in Bullhead City, Arizona
- K12OG-D in Taos, New Mexico
- K12PT-D in Ryndon, Nevada
- K12QH-D in Dolores, Colorado
- K12QM-D in Thomasville, Colorado
- K12QQ-D in Cedar City, Utah
- K12QS-D in Mink Creek, Idaho
- K12QT-D in Trout Creek, etc., Montana
- K12QW-D in Silver City, New Mexico
- K12QY-D in Leamington, Utah
- K12RA-D in Colstrip, Montana
- K12RD-D in Coulee City, Washington
- K12RE-D in Denton, Montana
- K12RF-D in Healy, etc., Alaska
- K12WZ-D in Long Valley Junction, Utah
- K12XA-D in Abilene, Texas
- K12XB-D in Eureka Springs, Arkansas
- K12XC-D in Salina & Redmond, Utah
- K12XD-D in Aurora, etc., Utah
- K12XE-D in Woodland, Utah
- K12XG-D in Roosevelt, Utah
- K12XH-D in Price, Utah
- K12XI-D in Helper, Utah
- K12XJ-D in Modesto, California
- K12XK-D in Denver, Colorado
- K12XO-D in Midland/Odessa, Texas
- K12XP-D in Phoenix, Arizona
- K12XQ-D in Monroe, Louisiana
- KJJM-LD in Dallas & Mesquite, Texas
- KJKZ-LD in Fresno, California
- KJOU-LD in Bakersfield, California
- KMBT-LD in Salinas, California
- KRJR-LD in Sacramento, California
- KSVC-LD in Marysvale, Utah
- KUSE-LD in Seattle, Washington
- KVGA-LD in Las Vegas, Nevada
- KYAV-LD in Palm Springs, California
- W12AQ-D in Black Mountain, North Carolina
- W12AR-D in Waynesville, etc., North Carolina
- W12CI-D in Hot Springs, North Carolina
- W12DI-D in Key West, Florida
- WBPA-LD in Pittsburgh, Pennsylvania
- WBQP-CD in Pensacola, Florida
- WCQA-LD in Springfield, Illinois
- WDNV-LD in Atlanta, Georgia
- WGBS-LD in Carrollton, Virginia
- WHDC-LD in Charleston, South Carolina
- WNDT-CD in Manhattan, New York, uses WNET'S full-power spectrum
- WPRQ-LD in Clarksdale, Mississippi
- WSOC-CR in Shelby, North Carolina
- WSOC-TV (DRT) in Statesville, North Carolina

The following low-power stations, which are no longer licensed, formerly broadcast on digital or analog channel 12:

- K12AA-D in Troy, Montana
- K12AH in Big Piney, etc., Wyoming
- K12AZ in Spring Glen, etc., Utah
- K12BF-D in Ardenvoir, Washington
- K12BK in Worland, Wyoming
- K12CD in Kanarraville, Utah
- K12CE in Scofield, Utah
- K12CT in Koosharem, Utah
- K12DL in Duchesne, etc., Utah
- K12DV in Potter Valley, California
- K12FG in Roosevelt, etc., Utah
- K12FY in Big Laramie, etc., Wyoming
- K12GI in Morgan, etc., Utah
- K12HP in Denton, Montana
- K12HY in Beowawe, Nevada
- K12IT in Smith, Nevada
- K12IX in Austin, Nevada
- K12JI in Newberry Springs, California
- K12JM in Peoa/Oakley, Utah
- K12KZ in Fruitland, Utah
- K12LC in Wanship, Utah
- K12LR in Forsyth, Montana
- K12MJ in Riverton, etc., Wyoming
- K12MO in Copper Center, Alaska
- K12ND in Kanab, Utah
- K12NO in Sheep Mountain, Alaska
- K12NP in Atmautluak, Alaska
- K12NR in Kake, Alaska
- K12NS in Akiak, Alaska
- K12NW in Halibut Cove, Alaska
- K12NZ in Idaho Falls, Idaho
- K12OR in Mesa, Colorado
- K12OV-D in Shelter Cove, California
- K12QO-D in Aspen, Colorado
- K12QV in San Bernardino, California
- K12QZ-D in San Luis Obispo, California
- KWSJ-LP in Snowflake, Arizona
- KWVG-LD in Malaga, etc., Washington
- W12AU in Burnsville, North Carolina
- W12BJ in Owensboro, Kentucky
- WRMX-LP in Nashville, Tennessee
- WZPC-LP in Panama City, Florida
