= Channel 12 TV stations in Canada =

The following television stations broadcast on digital or analog channel 12 in Canada:

- CFCF-DT in Montreal, Quebec
- CFRN-DT in Edmonton, Alberta
- CFTF-DT-3 in Cabano, Quebec
- CHAU-DT-9 in L'Anse-à-Valleau, Quebec
- CHEX-DT in Peterborough, Ontario
- CHNB-DT in Saint John, New Brunswick
- CIVA-DT in Val d'Or, Quebec
- CIVF-DT in Baie-Trinite, Quebec
- CKTV-DT in Saguenay, Quebec

== Defunct ==
- CFCN-TV-1 in Drumheller, Alberta
- CFRN-TV-3 in Whitecourt, Alberta
- CFRN-TV-4 in Ashmont, Alberta
- CFRN-TV-10 in Rocky Mountain House, Alberta
- CHTG-TV in Goose Bay, Newfoundland and Labrador
- CIRE-TV in High Prairie, Alberta
- CISA-TV-3 in Coleman, Alberta
- CISA-TV-4 in Waterton Park, Alberta
- CJCH-TV-2 in Truro, Nova Scotia
- CJCH-TV-3 in Valley, Nova Scotia
- CKAM-TV in Upsalquitch, New Brunswick
- CKBQ-TV-1 in Nipawin, Saskatchewan
- CKCK-TV-1 in Colgate, Saskatchewan
- CKMC-TV in Swift Current, Saskatchewan
- CKTN-TV-4 in Creston, British Columbia
- CKVR-TV-1 in Parry Sound, Ontario
- CKYD-TV in Dauphin, Manitoba
- CKYP-TV in The Pas, Manitoba
