= Channel 12 TV stations in Mexico =

The Following television stations Broadcast on Digital Channel 12 in Mexico:

- Bajío TV Canal 12.1 in León, Guanajuato.
- Azteca Uno in Matamoros, Tamaulipas.
