= XHL-TDT =

Television station in León, Guanajuato, Mexico

"Bajío TV Canal 12.1 XHL-TDT"
- León, Guanajuato, Mexico; Mexico
- Channels: Digital: 23 (UHF); Virtual: 12.1
- Branding: Televisa del Bajío

Programming
- Subchannels: 9.1 Nu9ve; 12.1 Televisa del Bajío

Ownership
- Owner: Televisa; (Televisora de Occidente, S.A. de C.V.)

History
- First air date: March 7, 1968
- Former channel numbers: 10 (1968–1999); 11 (analog and digital virtual, 1999–2006); 2 (analog and digital virtual, 2006–2016); 23 (virtual, 2016–2018); 9 (virtual, 2018–2019)
- Call sign meaning: León

Technical information
- ERP: 180 kW
- Transmitter coordinates: 21°09′35.21″N 101°42′53.79″W
- Translator(s): RF 23 Guanajuato; RF 23 Irapuato/Celaya

Links
- Website: televisaregional.com/guanajuato/inicio/

"XHL-TDT" is a Televisión Station in León, Guanajuato, Mexico on Virtual Channel 12. The Station is part of the Televisa Regional Division of Televisa and is known as Televisa del Bajío, Airing Local Content and Programming for viewers in León and Guanajuato.

== History ==
XHL-TV's concession was issued on March 26, 1968, to the Compañía Televisora de León, Guanajuato, S.A. (Leon, Guanajuato Broadcasting Company). The station had signed on March 7. XHL broadcast on channel 10 until the mid-1990s, when it was relocated to channel 11. The station, founded by Francisco Galindo Romero, was affiliated with Televisa from the start and had been planned since 1963.

Televisa switched the channels for its local programming in León in 2006, moving it to XHLGT-TV (channel 2), which would be known as Canal de Casa, and converting XHL into a full-time repeater of El Canal de las Estrellas. The swap was reversed in January 2016. In late 2019, the "Bajío TV" moniker used for XHL was dropped.

== Programming ==
XHL airs all of Televisa's locally produced programming for León and Guanajuato, including news, sports and local entertainment programming.

== Digital television ==
XHL-TDT began broadcasting October 25, 2010. In 2013, the transmitter was upgraded to broadcast in HD. On October 25, 2016, XHL began using virtual channel 23—its physical channel—as a result of virtual channel realignment: XHL's former analog number of 11 had been reserved nationally for Canal Once.

Bajío TV moved to virtual channel 12 in July 2019 after occupying channel 9 since 2018.

=== Subchannel ===
Televisa del Bajío carries Nu9ve as a subchannel on virtual channel 9.1 (formerly 9.2). The channel, then known as Gala TV, was added in 2017 as virtual channel 23.2.

=== Repeaters ===
XHL-TDT is broadcast on two dependent repeaters.

RF	Location	ERP
27	Guanajuato	20 kW
27	Irapuato, Celaya (Cerro Culiacán)	50 kW
