= 20th federal electoral district of Veracruz =

Defunct federal electoral district of Mexico

Coordinates: 18°00′N 94°38′W

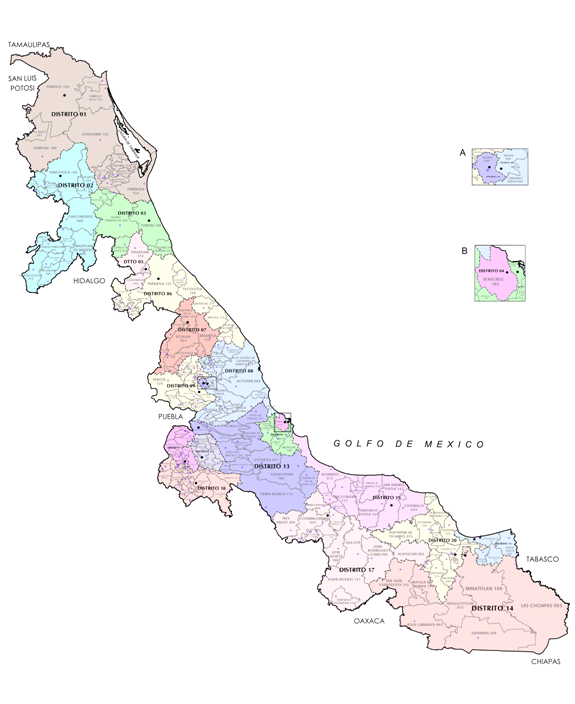
Veracruz under the 2017–2022 districting plan

The 20th federal electoral district of Veracruz (Spanish: Distrito electoral federal 20 de Veracruz) is a defunct federal electoral district of the Mexican state of Veracruz.

During its existence, the 20th district returned one deputy to the Chamber of Deputies for each of the 51st to 65th sessions of Congress. Votes cast in the district also counted towards the calculation of proportional representation ("plurinominal") deputies elected from the country's electoral regions.

Created as part of the 1977 political reforms, it was first contested in the 1979 mid-term election and it elected its last deputy in the 2021 mid-terms. It was dissolved by the National Electoral Institute (INE) in its 2023 redistricting process because the state's population no longer warranted 20 districts.

== District territory ==
Evolution of electoral district numbers
	1974	1978	1996	2005	2017	2023
Veracruz	15	23	23	21	20	19
Chamber of Deputies	196	300				

2017–2022

In its final form, the 20th district comprised 14 municipalities:
- Cosoleacaque, Chinameca, Hueyapan de Ocampo, Jáltipan, Mecayapan, Oluta, Oteapan, Pajapan, Soconusco, Soteapan, Texistepec, Zaragoza, Nanchital and Tatahuicapan.
The district's head town (cabecera distrital), where results from individual polling stations were gathered together and tallied, was the city of Cosoleacaque.

2005–2017

Between 2005 and 2017 the 20th district's head town was the city of Acayucan. It covered 11 municipalities in the south-east of the state:
- Acayucan, Chacaltianguis, Isla, Juan Rodríguez Clara, Playa Vicente, San Juan Evangelista, Sayula de Alemán, José Azueta, Tuxtilla, Carlos A. Carrillo and Santiago Sochiapan.

1996–2005

Under the 1996 districting plan, the head town was at Acayucan and the district covered nine municipalities.

1978–1996

The districting scheme in force from 1978 to 1996 was the result of the 1977 electoral reforms, which increased the number of single-member seats in the Chamber of Deputies from 196 to 300. Under that plan, Veracruz's seat allocation rose from 15 to 23. The newly created 20th district had its head town at Zongolica, and it covered the municipalities of Acultzingo, Astacinga, Atlahuilco, Camerino Z. Mendoza, Coetzala, Cuichapa, Cuitláhuac, Magdalena, Mixtla de Altamirano, Naranjal, Omealca, Los Reyes, San Andrés Tenejapan, Soledad Atzompa, Tehuipango, Tequila, Texhuacán, Tezonapa, Tlaquilpa, Tlilapan, Xoxocotla, Yanga and Zongolica.

== Deputies returned to Congress ==
(Mexico) National parties
- Current
- PAN
- PRI
- PT
- PVEM
- MC
- Morena
- PAZ
- Somos
- Defunct or local only
- PLM
- PNR
- PRM
- PNM
- PP
- PPS
- PARM
- PFCRN
- CON
- PANAL
- PSD
- PES
- PES
- PRD

Veracruz's 20th district
Election	Deputy	Party	Term	Legislature
1979	Gonzalo Sedas Rodríguez	Institutional Revolutionary Party	1979–1982	51st Congress
1982	Ramón Ojeda Mestre	Institutional Revolutionary Party	1982–1985	52nd Congress
1985	Pastor Murguía González	Institutional Revolutionary Party	1985–1988	53rd Congress
1988	Jorge Sierra Gallardo	Institutional Revolutionary Party	1988–1991	54th Congress
1991	Ignacia García López	Institutional Revolutionary Party	1991–1994	55th Congress
1994	Erasmo Delgado Guerra	Institutional Revolutionary Party	1994–1997	56th Congress
1997	David Dávila Domínguez	Institutional Revolutionary Party	1997–2000	57th Congress
2000	Jaime Mantecón Rojo	Institutional Revolutionary Party	2000–2003	58th Congress
2003	Regina Vázquez Saut	National Action Party (Mexico)	2003–2006	59th Congress
2006	Gregorio Barradas Miravete	National Action Party (Mexico)	2006–2009	60th Congress
2009	Fabiola Vázquez Saut (Note: Vázquez Saut resigned her seat on 16 March 2010 and was replaced by her substitute, Rodríguez González.); Rafael Rodríguez González	Institutional Revolutionary Party	2009–2012	61st Congress
2012	Regina Vázquez Saut	Institutional Revolutionary Party	2012–2015	62nd Congress
2015	Erick Lagos Hernández	Institutional Revolutionary Party	2015–2018	63rd Congress
2018	Eulalio Ríos Fararoni	National Regeneration Movement	2018–2021	64th Congress
2021	Esteban Bautista Hernández	National Regeneration Movement	2021–2024	65th Congress

== Presidential elections ==
Veracruz's 20th district
Election	District won by	Party or coalition	%
2018	Andrés Manuel López Obrador	Juntos Haremos Historia	64.0912
