= Huiloapan de Cuauhtémoc =

Municipality in the Mexican state of Veracruz

- Municipality
- Location in Mexico Huiloapan de Cuauhtémoc (Mexico)
- Country: Mexico
- State: Veracruz
- Demonym: (in Spanish)
- Time zone: UTC−6 (CST)

Huiloapan de Cuauhtémoc is a municipality of the Mexican state of Veracruz. It is located in the central zone of the state, about 180 km from Xalapa, the state capital. It has a surface area of 23.85 km^{2}.

Huiloapan de Cuauhtémoc (Veracruz)
Huiloapan de Cuauhtémoc (Mexico)

The municipality of Huiloapan de Cuauhtémoc is delimited to the north by Rafael Delgado, Nogales and Tlilapan, to the east by San Andrés Tenejapan and Soteapan, to the south by Atlahuilco and Soledad Atzompa, and to the west by Nogales and Isla.

It primarily produces maize and coffee.

In December, a celebration takes place within the town in honor of La Purísima Concepción, Patron of the town.

The weather in Huiloapan de Cuauhtémoc is cold all year with rains in summer and autumn.
