= Rafael Delgado =

Rafael Delgado may refer to:

- Rafael Delgado (author) (1853–1914), Mexican writer
  - Rafael Delgado, Veracruz, municipality in Mexico named after the author
- Rafael Delgado (footballer) (born 1990), Argentine footballer
- Rafael Delgado (The Young and the Restless), fictional character in The Young and the Restless, a U.S. soap opera
- Rafael Delgado Barreneche (1906–1983), politician and diplomat affiliated with the Colombian Conservative Party
