= Saut =

Saut may refer to:

- Historical name of Asyut, capital of the modern Asyut Governorate in Egypt
- Saut d'Eau, French for "Waterfall", a small island in the Republic of Trinidad and Tobago
- Po Saut (?–1693), king of Panduranga Champa from 1660 to 1692
- Regina Vázquez Saut (born 1981), Mexican politician
- Judith Vázquez Saut (born 1977), Mexican politician

== See also ==
- Saut., taxonomic author abbreviation for Anton Eleutherius Sauter (1800–1881), Austrian physician and botanist
