= Alvarado mangroves =

Mangroves ecoregion of Tamaulipas and Veracruz, Mexico

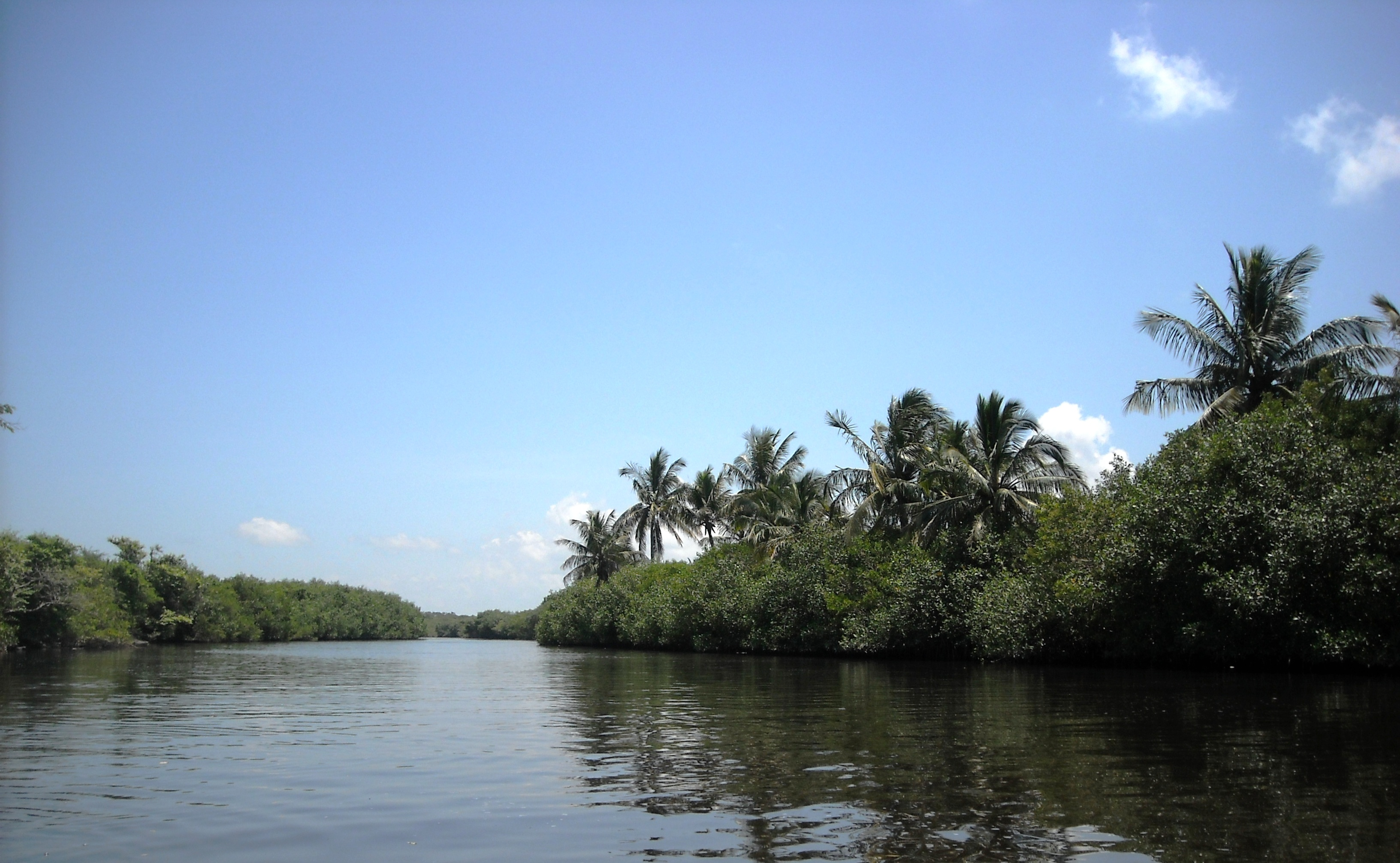
- Mangrove swamp of the Tuxpan River, Veracruz State, Mexico

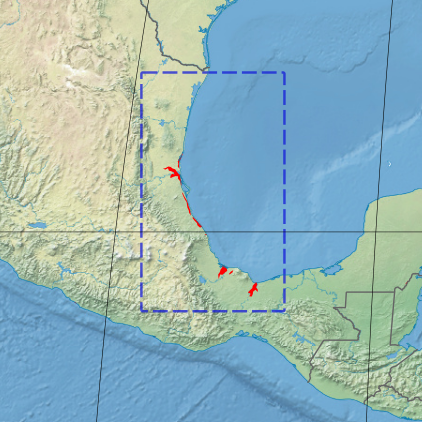
- Ecoregion territory (in red)

Ecology
- Realm: Neotropic
- Biome: Mangroves
- Borders: Petén-Veracruz moist forests; Sierra de los Tuxtlas; Veracruz dry forests; Veracruz moist forests

Geography
- Area: 4,403 km^{2} (1,700 sq mi)
- Coordinates: 21.76°N 97.654°W

The Alvarado mangroves ecoregion (WWF ID: NT1401) covers a series of mangrove forest areas along the Gulf of Mexico coast of the states of Tamaulipas and Veracruz in Mexico. they are the most northerly mangroves in the western Gulf. The largest tracts of mangrove swamps occur at the mouths of rivers, and nearby coastal lagoon.

== Location and description ==
The Alvarado mangroves form in large areas at river mouths where fresh water from the interior mixes with saltwater from the Gulf in proportions that provide an advantage to salt-tolerant mangrove tree species. Depending on local conditions, mangroves in this ecoregion can occur from the US/Mexico border in the north, to the border between Veracruz state and Tabasco state 1,000 km to the south. Mangroves in this area are the farthest north, and are characterized by higher levels of freshwater than further south.

The largest mangrove sites are (from north to south):

- Altamira, a port city north of Tampico, is on a coastal lagoon that connects the estuaries of several rivers for 50 km to the north.
- Tamesí River, river that enters the Gulf at the city of Tampico, supports mangroves for 60 km upstream from the coast.
- Pánuco River, another major river that enters the Gulf at Tampico.
- Tamiahua Lagoon, a long inlet behind Cape Roja, that starts about 50 km south of Tampico. The lagoon is a RAMSAR wetland of international importance. Just south of the lagoon is the mouth of the Pantepec River / Tuxpan River.
- Tecolutla River, a river estuary with coastal inlets and lagoons stretching 30 km north and south of the river mouth.
- Alvarado Lagoon, at the mouth of the Papaloapan River. The lagoon is a RAMSAR wetland of international importance.
- Sontecomapan Lagoon, a RAMSAR wetland of international importance.
- Coatzacoalcos River, which enters the Gulf at the city of Coatzacoalcos.

== Climate ==
The climate of the ecoregion is Tropical savanna climate - dry winter (Köppen climate classification (Aw)). This climate is characterized by relatively even temperatures throughout the year, and a pronounced dry season. The driest month has less than 60 mm of precipitation, and is drier than the average month. The summer is the wet season, and precipitation ranges from 1,200 to 2,500 mm/year.

== Flora and fauna ==
The most common mangrove tree species are red mangrove (Rhizophora mangle), which can reach 17 meters in height and is typically found along the margins of channels with other Rhizophora species, black mangrove ( Avicennia germinans), and white mangrove (Laguncularia racemosa). Epiphytes are common, and a common associated plant is the golden leather fern (Acrostichum aureum).

Characteristic birds of the area include the sungrebe, black-collared hawk, bare-throated tiger heron (Tigrisoma mexicanum), the tricolored heron (Egretta tricolor), the near-threatened reddish egret (Egretta rufescens), the jabiru (Jabiru mycteria), the wood stork (Mycteria americana), that swallow-tailed kite (Elanoides forficatus), the zone-tailed hawk (Buteo albonotatus), the amazon kingfisher (Chloroceryle amazona), and the prothonotary warbler (Protonotaria citrea).

== Protected areas ==
There are officially protected areas in the largest mangrove areas, including the RAMSAR sites:

- Laguna de Tamiahua.
- Sistema Lagunar Alvarado.
- Manglares y humedales de la Laguna de Sontecomapan.
