= Cañón del Río Blanco National Park =

National park in Mexico

- Parque Nacional Cañón del Río Blanco
- IUCN category II (national park)
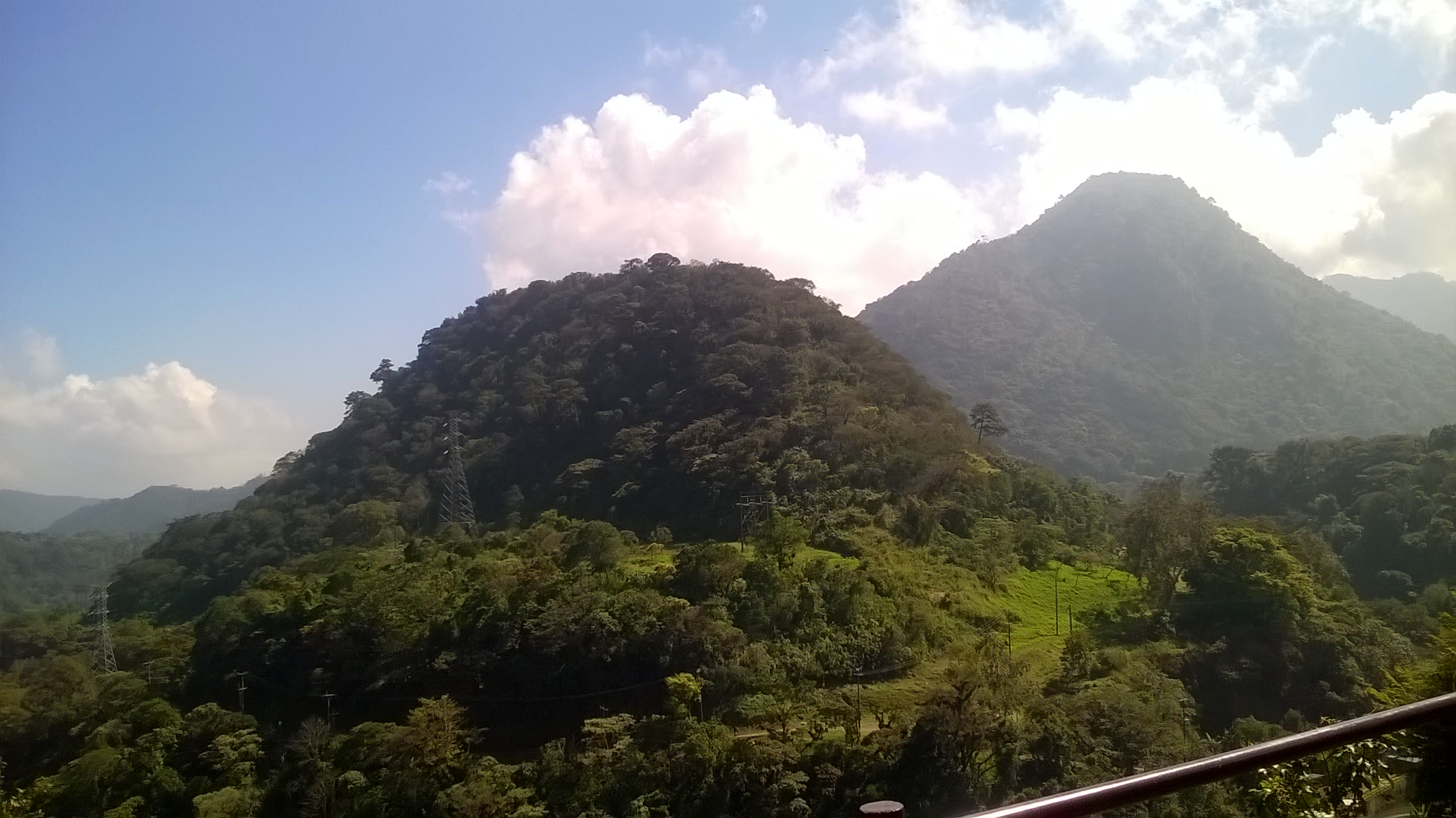
- Interactive map of Cañón del Río Blanco National Park
- Location: Veracruz, Mexico
- Nearest city: Orizaba
- Coordinates: 18.82°N 97.17°W
- Area: 488 km^{2} (188 sq mi)
- Designation: National park
- Designated: 1938
- Governing body: National Commission of Natural Protected Areas

Cañón del Río Blanco National Park is protected natural area in Mexico's Veracruz state.

== Geography ==
Cañón del Río Blanco National Park covers an area of 488 km^{2}. The park includes the upper watershed of the Río Blanco, where the river has carved a canyon through the Sierra Madre de Oaxaca, plunging over rapids and waterfalls as it descends from the mountains towards the Gulf Coastal Plain to empty into the Gulf of Mexico.

The park is in the Sierra de Zongolica, the northern sub-range of the Sierra Madre de Oaxaca. Pico de Orizaba, a volcano the Trans-Mexican Volcanic Belt and Mexico's highest peak, lies several kilometers north of the park.

== Flora and fauna ==
Plant communities in the park include pine forest, oak forest, montane moist evergreen forest, and evergreen rain forest.

== Conservation ==
Cañón del Río Blanco was decreed a national park in 1938 by president Lázaro Cárdenas.
