= Rafael Rodríguez González =

Rafael Rodríguez González may refer to:

- Rafael Rodríguez González (Puerto Rican politician) (fl. 1990s)
- Rafael Rodríguez González (Mexican politician) (born 1972)
