= Nogales Municipality =

Nogales Municipality may refer to:

- Nogales Municipality, Veracruz, Mexico
- Nogales Municipality, Sonora, Mexico
