= Río Blanco, Veracruz =

Municipality in Veracruz, Mexico

Río Blanco
- Municipality and town
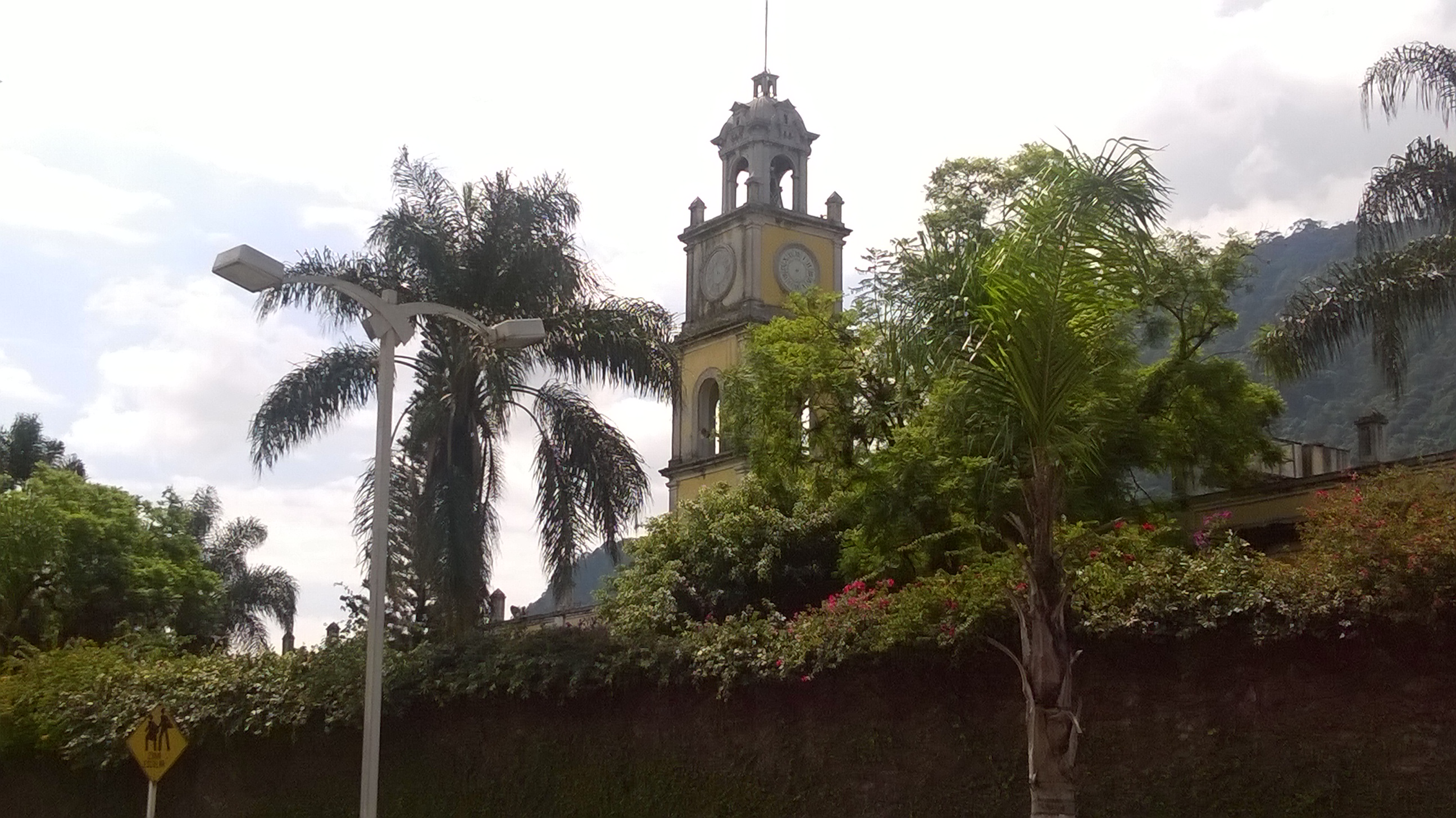
- Ex-factory of Río Blanco
- Interactive map of Río Blanco
- Country: Mexico
- State: Veracruz

Government
  - Mayor: Ricardo Pérez García

Population (2020)
  - Total: 41,785
- Time zone: UTC-6 (Central Standard Time)

Río Blanco is a municipality located in the montane central zone of the Mexican state of Veracruz, about 140 km from the state capital Xalapa. It has an area of 24.68 km^{2}. It is located at 18°50′N 97°09′W. The Decree of June 8, 1899 ordained that Tenango's municipal head-board create the municipality of Río Blanco designating it as Tenango de Río Blanco. In the same year French financiers initiated the construction of the largest textile factory in Latin America, which was inaugurated on October 9, 1892, by President Porfirio Díaz. One thousand seven hundred workers came to be employed at Rio Blanco, including only 60 women.

== Geography ==
The municipality of Río Blanco is delimited to the north by Ixhuatlancillo and Orizaba to the south-east by Rafael Delgado and to the west by Nogales. The village of Tenango is very ancient and on the Independence having commemorated it constituted a municipality. On order of June 5, 1826 one declared that Huiloapan, Tenango and Nogales, they will have to form an alone municipality, but on November 4 24, 1859, the Minister of Government, it informed to the political chief that for instructions of the President of the Republic, the mentioned municipalities will have to remain again divided.

== Agriculture ==
It produces principally maize, coffee, sugarcane and watermelon.

== Celebrations ==
In Río Blanco, the celebration in honor to San Pedro y San Pablo, Patrons of the town, takes place in June, and the celebration in honor to Virgen de Guadalupe takes place in December.

== History ==
Río Blanco's company store was leased to Victor Garcín, a Barcelonnette who had been in the region for some decades since 1897. He was already an important landowner in the Orizaba valley, since in that year CIVSA bought land from him to build a water channel. Eduardo Garcín, his brother, was CIDOSA's manager in 1903 and a member of the CIDOSA board in the General Assembly minutes of 1905 and 1906.

The massacre of January 7 and 8, 1907, known in Mexican history as the Río Blanco strike, put company stores in the Orizaba valley on the national front stage as one of the main causes of workers discontent. Stores were the main target of workers' attacks. This event was crucial in shaping the bad reputation of company stores during the Porfiriato. Thereafter, they became a symbol of both the injustices that prevailed during the period and workers' opposition to it, a preamble to the Mexican Revolution.
