= Xoxocotla =

Xoxocotla may refer to:

- Xoxocotla, Morelos, a town and its surrounding municipality
- Xoxocotla, Veracruz, a town and its surrounding municipality
