= Xoxocotla, Veracruz =

Xoxocotla
- Municipality
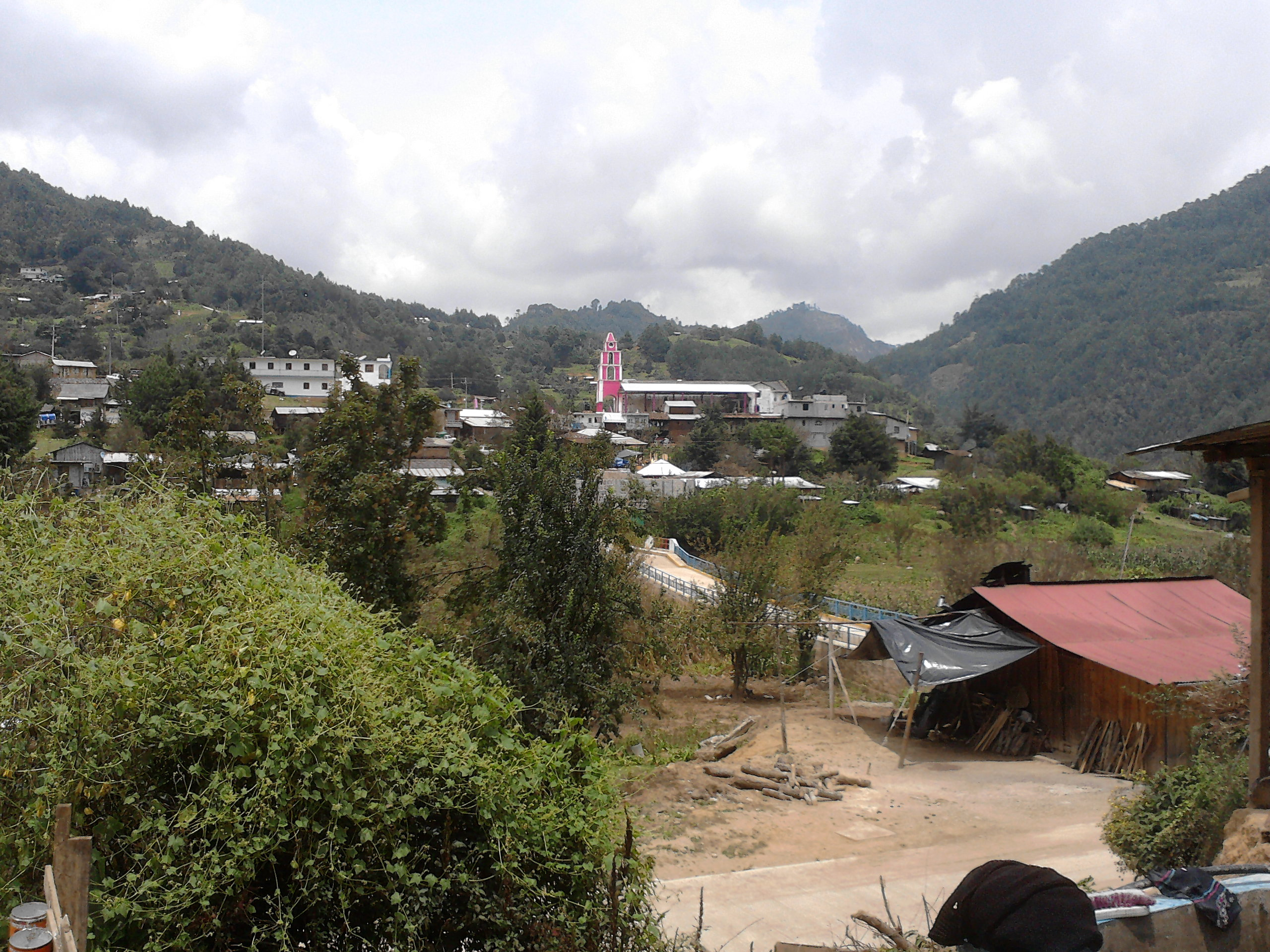
- View of the municipal seat of Xoxocotla

- Location in Veracruz

- Location in Mexico
- Coordinates: 18°38′48″N 97°09′01″W
- Country: Mexico
- State: Veracruz
- Established: 30 November 1870
- Seat: Xoxocotla

Government
  - President: Magdaleno Juárez Pérez

Area
  - Total: 37.398 km^{2} (14.439 sq mi)
- Elevation (of seat): 2,099 m (6,886 ft)

Population (2010 Census)
  - Total: 5,163
  - Estimate (2015 Intercensal Survey): 5,446
  - Density: 138.1/km^{2} (357.6/sq mi)
  - Seat: 2,362
- Time zone: UTC-6 (Central)
- Postal codes: 94820–94825
- Area code: 278
- Website: Official website

Xoxocotla (Nahuatl: "place of green pines" or "place of old ocotes") is a municipality in the Mexican state of Veracruz, located 103 kilometres (64 mi) south of the state capital Xalapa.

== Geography ==
The municipality of Xoxocotla is located in the Sierra de Zongolica, which are foothills of the Sierra Madre Oriental in central Veracruz. It lies at an altitude between 2,100 and 2,700 metres (6,900–8,900 ft). It borders the Veracruzian municipalities of Soledad Atzompa to the northwest, Atlahuilco to the northeast, and Tlaquilpa to the east, as well as the municipality of Vicente Guerrero in the state of Puebla to the south. The municipality covers an area of 37.398 square kilometres (14.439 sq mi) and comprises 0.05% of the state's area.

The land in Xoxocotla is divided between farmland (50%), forest (44%) and urban areas (6%). Soils in the municipality consist of luvisols (73%) and regosols (21%). The municipality is drained by tributaries of the Blanco River, which itself drains into Alvarado Lagoon at the mouth of the Papaloapan River.

Xoxocotla has a temperate climate with rain in the summer. Average temperatures in the municipality range between 12 and 18 °C (54–64 °F), and average annual precipitation ranges between 100 and 1,100 millimetres (3.9–43.3 in).

== History ==
The municipality of was incorporated on 30 November 1870, forming part of the canton of Zongolica in the state of Veracruz. It became a free municipality on 15 January 1918.

== Administration ==
The municipal government comprises a president, a councillor (Spanish: síndico), and a trustee (regidor). The current president of the municipality is Magdaleno Juárez Pérez.

== Demographics ==
In the 2010 Mexican Census, the municipality of Xoxocotla recorded a population of 5163 inhabitants living in 1137 households. The 2015 Intercensal Survey estimated a population of 5446 inhabitants in Xoxocotla, 92.29% of whom reported being of Indigenous ancestry and 37.33% of whom reported being of African ancestry. In the 2010 Census, 1163 people or 23% of the population in Xoxocotla reported speaking an Indigenous language, 1118 of which spoke Nahuatl.

There are 17 localities in the municipality, of which only the municipal seat, also called Xoxocotla, is classified as urban. It recorded a population of 2362 inhabitants in the 2010 Census.

== Economy ==
Important economic activities in Xoxocotla include pig farming and the growing of corn and beans.
