= Atlahuilco =

Municipality in Mexico

- Municipality
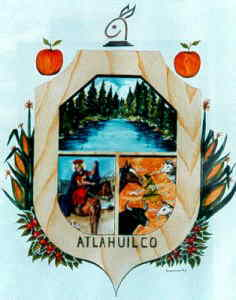
- Coat of arms

- Location in Mexico Atlahuilco (Mexico)
- Country: Mexico
- State: Veracruz
- Demonym: (in Spanish)
- Time zone: UTC−6 (CST)

Atlahuilco is a municipality in the Mexican state of Veracruz. It is located about 131 km from state capital Xalapa. It has a surface of 64.98 km^{2}. It is located at 18°42′N 97°05′W.

== Geography ==
The municipality of Atlahuilco is delimited to the north by Tlilapan, to the north-east by San Andrés Tenejapan, to the east by Tequila, Veracruz, to the south-east by Los Reyes, to the south by Xoxocotla, to the west by Soledad Atzompa and to the north-west by Huiloapan de Cuauhtémoc.

== Economy ==
It produces principally maize.

== Culture ==
In Atlahuilco, from 11 to the 12 November takes place the celebration in honor to San Martin Caballero, Patron of the place. During the celebration, they perform dances like that of the Tocotines, Moors and Christians. The interpreted traditional dances are accompanied by sones with guitar, violin, vihuela and contrabass and specially at the moment when the flower is carried and when the arc is decorated. A floral arc is placed on the reception of the Virgin image.
