= San Andrés Tenejapan =

Municipality in the Mexican state of Veracruz

- Municipality
- Location in Mexico San Andrés Tenejapan (Mexico)
- Country: Mexico
- State: Veracruz
- Demonym: (in Spanish)
- Time zone: UTC−6 (CST)

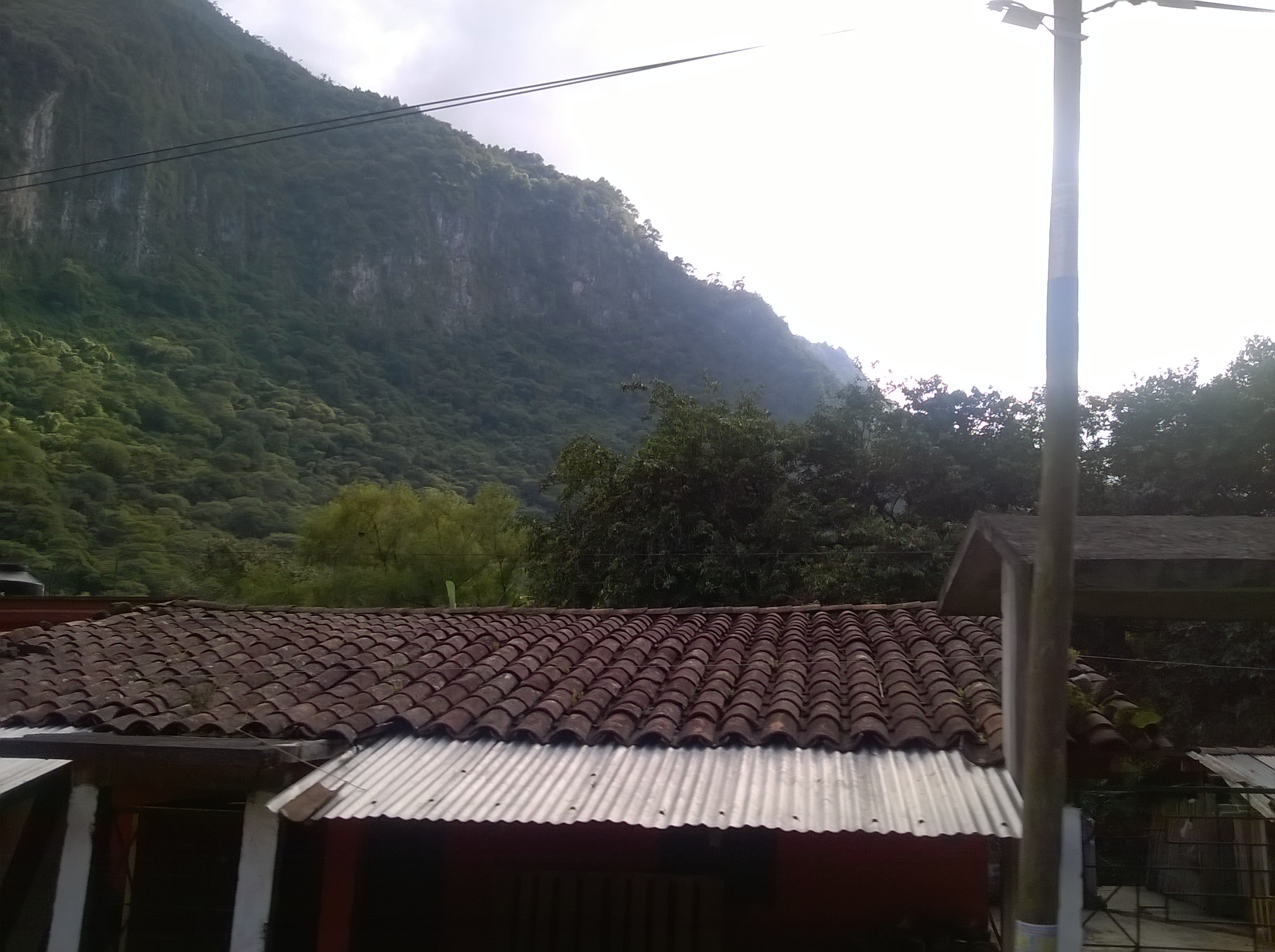
Typical house in San Andrés Tenejapan, Veracruz

San Andrés Tenejapan is a municipality located in the montane central zone of the Mexican state of Veracruz, about 85 km from the state capital Xalapa. It has a surface of 24.68 km^{2}. It is located at 18°47′N 97°06′W.

== Geography ==
The municipality of San Andrés Tenejapan is delimited to the north by Tlilapan and Rafael Delgado to the east by Rafael Delgado, Rafael Delgado and Tlilapan, to the south by Tequila and Atlahuilco and to the west by Huiloapan de Cuauhtémoc. It is watered by small rivers, which are tributaries of the Río Blanco.

The weather in San Andrés Tenejapan is cold and wet all year with rains in summer and autumn.

== Agriculture ==
It produces principally maize.

== Celebrations ==
In San Andrés Tenejapan, the celebration in honor to Virgen de la Candelaria takes place in February, Patron of the town, and the celebration in honor to Virgen de Guadalupe takes place in December.
