= Cirilo Vázquez =

Mexican politician (1955–2006)

Cirilo Vázquez

Cirilo Vázquez Lagunes (died November 19, 2006), nicknamed "Cacique of the South," ("cacique del sur" in Spanish) was a Mexican cattle rancher and businessman who had political power in areas in the state of Veracruz. Vázquez died at the hands of assassins at the age of 51.

Dudley Althaus of the Houston Chronicle said that Cirilo Vázquez was "arguably the most powerful political figure in the southern coastal lowlands of Veracruz state." Vázquez, a cacique (a local baron), loaned money and built infrastructure for the areas he lived in. Vázquez never ran for office and was never elected to any government position.

Vázquez had a wife, Deisi Valencia, who served as the mayor of San Juan Evangelista. Vázquez had two daughters, including Fabiola Vázquez Saut, the former mayor of Acayucan, and Regina Vázquez Saut, a former federal congressperson.

Vázquez also had an older brother, Ponciano Vázquez Lagunes; in June 2006, several kidnappers kidnapped Ponciano, demanded the equivalent of two million U.S. dollars in return for Ponciano's release, and killed Ponciano. Despite the act, Vázquez refused to take extra security measures.

Due to a reputation for violence and because of his ambition and shrewd nature, he became well known in the early 1980s. In the 1980s, Vázquez engineered elections of Fabiola and his wife to their respective mayoral positions; he also had Regina elected to the Chamber of Deputies.

Authorities imprisoned Vázquez on three occasions for weapons possession, drug trafficking, and murder. Authorities never convicted Vázquez. Friends and family members of Vázquez said that the imprisonments were motivated by politics.

As of 2006 some residents of the Veracruz area sing at least one half-dozen corridos (folk ballads) about Vázquez. One of the corridos depicts a shootout with federal police in the 1980s that left Vázquez's four companions dead and Vázquez in prison.

On November 19, 2006, several assassins ambushed Vázquez as he returned from a semi-pro baseball game in which his team had defeated a regional rival with a 10–1 win. The men shot Vázquez at least twelve times, including three times in the head. Three municipal police officers, who served as Vázquez's bodyguards, and the father of Vázquez's common law wife also died.
