= Jaime Mantecón Rojo =

Mexican politician

- Born: 6 May 1950 (age 76); Veracruz, Veracruz, Mexico
- Occupation: Politician
- Political party: PRI

Jaime Mantecón Rojo (born 6 May 1950) is a Mexican politician from the Institutional Revolutionary Party (PRI). In the 2000 general election he was elected to the Chamber of Deputies to represent Veracruz's 20th district during the 58th Congress.
