= Alvarado Lagoon System =

Wetland complex in Veracruz

Designations

Ramsar Wetland
- Official name: Sistema Lagunar Alvarado
- Designated: 2 February 2004
- Reference no.: 1355
- area: 267,010 ha
- coordinates: 18°39′N 95°51′W

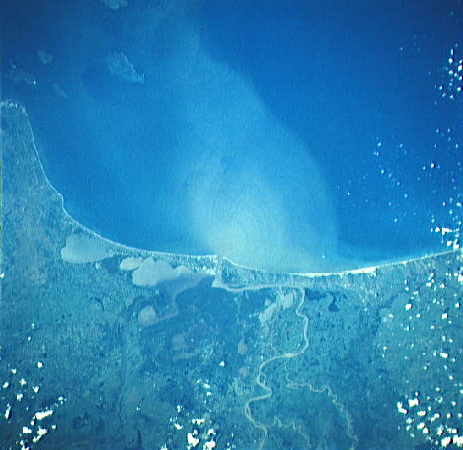

The Alvarado Lagoon System is a large estuary and wetland complex in Veracruz state of eastern Mexico. It is located on the southern Gulf Coastal Plain, where the Papaloapan and Blanco rivers meet the Gulf of Mexico.

== Geography ==
The lagoon system includes several brackish coastal lagoons, including Alvarado Lagoon, many tidal channels and interior lagoons, and extensive wetlands and coastal dunes.

== Flora and fauna ==
Habitats include large areas of mangrove, marshes of sedges (Cyperus spp.), and cattails (Typha spp.), swamp forests or apompales of Pachira aquatica, palm forests of Sabal mexicana, Attalea butyracea, and Acrocomia mexicana, and riparian oak forests of Quercus oleoides.

The Alvarado Lagoon System provides habitat for numerous waterfowl and wetland birds, and is designated an Important Bird Area. The lagoons are also an important habitat for the West Indian manatee (Trichechus manatus).

346 species of birds have been recorded in the wetlands. 50% are year-round residents, 32% winter residents, 2% summer residents, 10% transitory, and the rest occasional visitors. The wetlands are a congregation area for waterbirds, including northern pintail (Anas acuta) American white pelican (Pelecanus erythrorhynchos), brown pelican (Pelecanus occidentalis), piping plover (Charadrius melodus), and least bittern (Ixobrychus exilis). White-winged dove (Zenaida asiatica) is plentiful. It is a breeding area for raptors, including the snail kite (Rostrhamus sociabilis), common black hawk (Buteogallus anthracinus), great black hawk (Buteogallus urubitinga) and black-collared hawk (Busarellus nigricollis). The scissor-tailed flycatcher (Tyrannus forficatus) and eastern kingbird (Tyrannus tyrannus) are migrants. At-risk species include the snail kite, piping plover, least bittern, peregrine falcon (Falco peregrinus), and lesser yellow-headed vulture (Cathartes burrovianus).

== Conservation and threats ==
Threats to the wetlands include expansion of agriculture and cattle ranches, mangrove cutting, unsustainable fishing practices, and upstream erosion silting up the lagoons and wetlands.

The lagoon system was designated a Ramsar site (wetland of international importance) in 2004.
