= Soledad Atzompa =

Village in the Mexican state of Veracruz

- Municipality
- Location in Mexico Soledad Atzompa (Mexico)
- Country: Mexico
- State: Veracruz
- Demonym: (in Spanish)
- Time zone: UTC−6 (CST)

Soledad Atzompa (18°45′N 97°09′W) is a village in the mountainous central zone in the Mexican state of Veracruz, about 90 km south-west of the state capital Xalapa. It has an area of 65.80 km^{2} and stands at an elevation of 2260 metres above sea level.

== Name ==
Its name, Atzompa, comes from the nahuatl language and refers to the small river valleys on the mountain looking like a scalp In time it took the other part of its name from the Soledad river which runs through the town. This river is a tributary of the River Blanco.

== Geography ==
The municipality of Soledad Atzompa is delimited to the north by Huiloapan de Cuauhtémoc, to the east by Atlahuilco, to the southeast by Xoxocotla, and to the west and northwest by Acultzingo. There had been a number of border disputes in the past settled by a decree in 1982.

The climate of Soledad Atzompa is temperate-humid, with an average temperature of 12 °C; annual average rainfall is 887 mm.

== Agriculture ==
The local soil is composed of sandy rock and only 50% can be used for agriculture. The area produces principally maize.

== Celebrations ==
In February there are celebrations in honor of "Virgen de la Candelaria", patron of the town, and in December there are celebrations in honor to Virgin of Guadalupe.
