= Rafael Delgado (author) =

Mexican author (1853–1914)

Rafael Delgado (20 August 1853 – 20 May 1914) was a Mexican author. In 1896, he became a member of the Academia Mexicana de la Lengua, occupying the 12th (XII) chair.

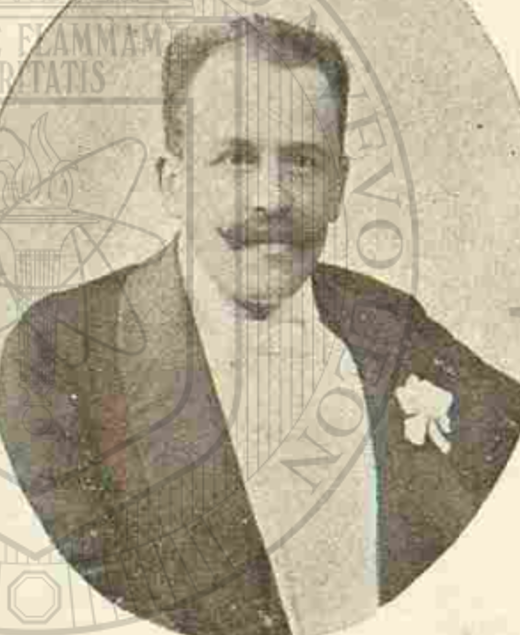
Rafael Delgado, 1902

== Biography ==
Ángel de Jesús Rafael Delgado Sáinz was born on 20 August 1853 in Córdoba, Veracruz, to Pedro Delgado and María de Jesús Sáinz. His parents were religious conservatives and moved the family to Orizaba after increasing liberal sentiment in Córdoba. Delgado earned a degree in education from the Colegio Nacional de Orizaba, where he subsequently taught literature and history.

Delgado was invited by José López Portillo y Rojas, the governor of Jalisco, to serve as director of the state's department of education, though his arthritis forced him to return to Orizaba shortly afterward. He died on 20 May 1914, having never married.

== Works ==
- Mi vida en Soledad (1879)
- Antes de la boda monólogo (1899)
- La calandria novela (1890)
- Angelina novela (1893)
- Los parientes ricos cuentos y notas (1901)
- Historia vulgar novela corta (1904)
- Lecciones de literatura (1904)
- Lecciones de geografía histórica (1910)
- Sonetos publicación póstuma (1940)
- Mi única mentira...
- Himno a Nicolás Bravo

== Legacy ==
In 1932, the town and municipality of San Juan del Río, Veracruz, adopted the name of Rafael Delgado in his honour.

== Bibliography ==
- James Graham Bickley (1935). The Life and Works of Rafael Delgado. University of California.
