= Tamiahua Lagoon =

Coastal lagoon in Veracruz, Mexico

Coordinates: 21.66°N 97.59°W

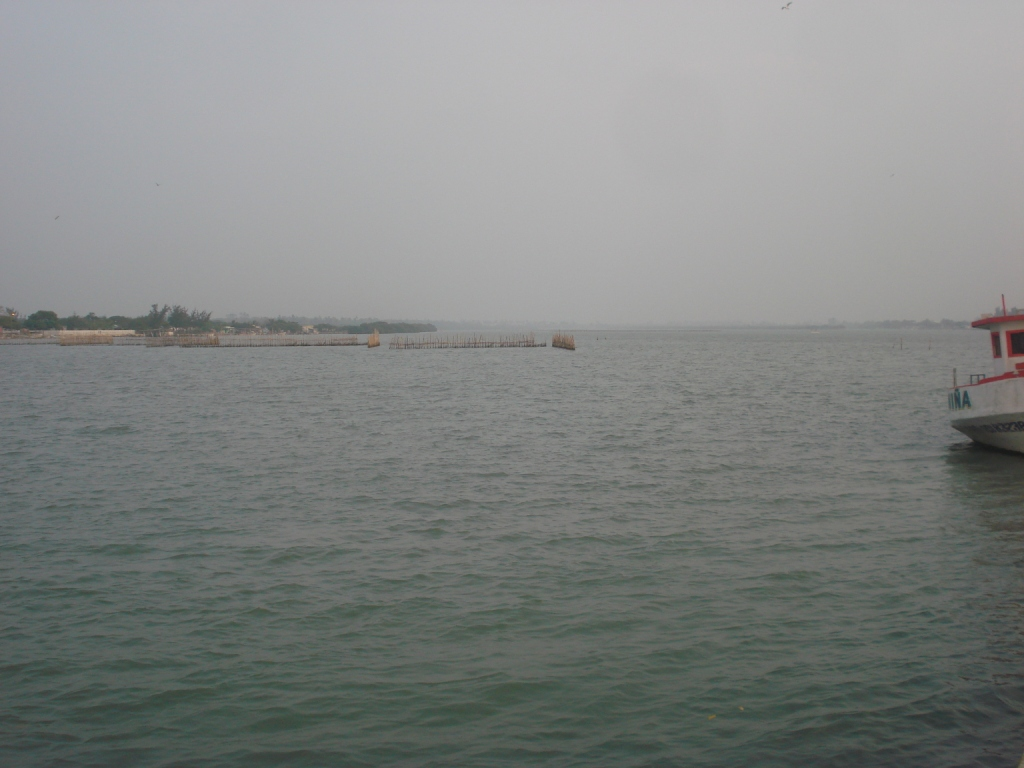
Tamiahua Lagoon, Veracruz

Tamiahua Lagoon (Spanish: Laguna de Tamiahua) is a long coastal lagoon in the Mexican state of Veracruz. It is an inlet of the Gulf of Mexico that extends 65 miles south from Tampico. The peninsula of Cape Rojo separates the lagoon from the sea. The islands of Idolo and Juana Ramírez lie within the lagoon. The settlements of Tamiahua and San Jerónimo lie along its shores.
