= Blanco River (Veracruz) =

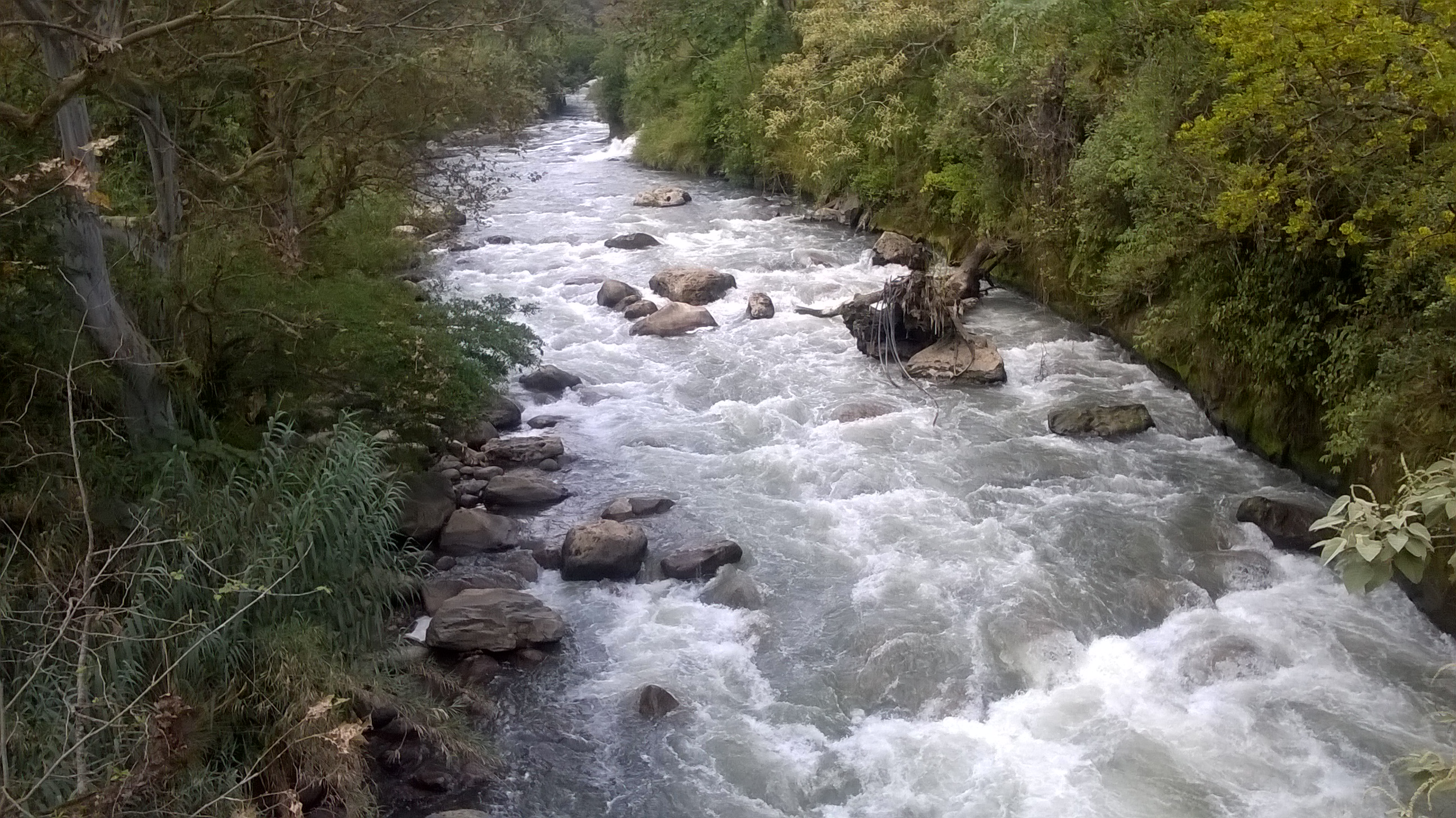
- The Blanco River in Ixtaczoquitlán, Veracruz
- Native name: Río Blanco (Spanish)

Location
- country: Mexico
- states: Veracruz, Puebla

Physical characteristics
- Source: Pico de Orizaba and Sierra de Zongolica
- Mouth: Alvarado Lagoon, Gulf of Mexico
  - coordinates: 18°43′54″N 95°49′54″W

The Blanco River (Río Blanco) is a river of central Veracruz state in eastern Mexico.

The Blanco's headwaters are in the mountains along the boundary between Puebla and Veracruz states, from Pico de Orizaba, Mexico's highest peak, in the north to the Sierra de Zongolica in the south, where the southeastern Trans-Mexican Volcanic Belt meets the northern end of the Sierra Madre de Oaxaca. The upper Blanco forms a deep canyon, which is protected by Cañón del Río Blanco National Park. The river flows eastwards though the towns of Orizaba and Córdoba before emerging onto the southern Gulf Coastal Plain.

The Alvarado Lagoon System is an extensive coastal wetland and estuary formed by the lower Blanco and Papaloapan rivers, with lagoons, tidal channels, reed beds, mangroves, swamp forests, and coastal dunes.
