= Rafael Rodríguez González (Mexican politician) =

Mexican politician (born 1972)

- Born: 10 January 1972 (age 54); Juan Rodríguez Clara, Veracruz, Mexico
- Occupation: Politician
- Political party: PRI

Rafael Rodríguez González (born 10 January 1972) is a Mexican politician from the Institutional Revolutionary Party (PRI). In 2010–2012 he sat in the Chamber of Deputies to represent Veracruz's 20th district during the 61st Congress, acting as the substitute of Judith Fabiola Vázquez Saut.
