= Rafael Delgado, Veracruz =

Municipality in Veracruz, Mexico

Rafael Delgado
- City and municipality
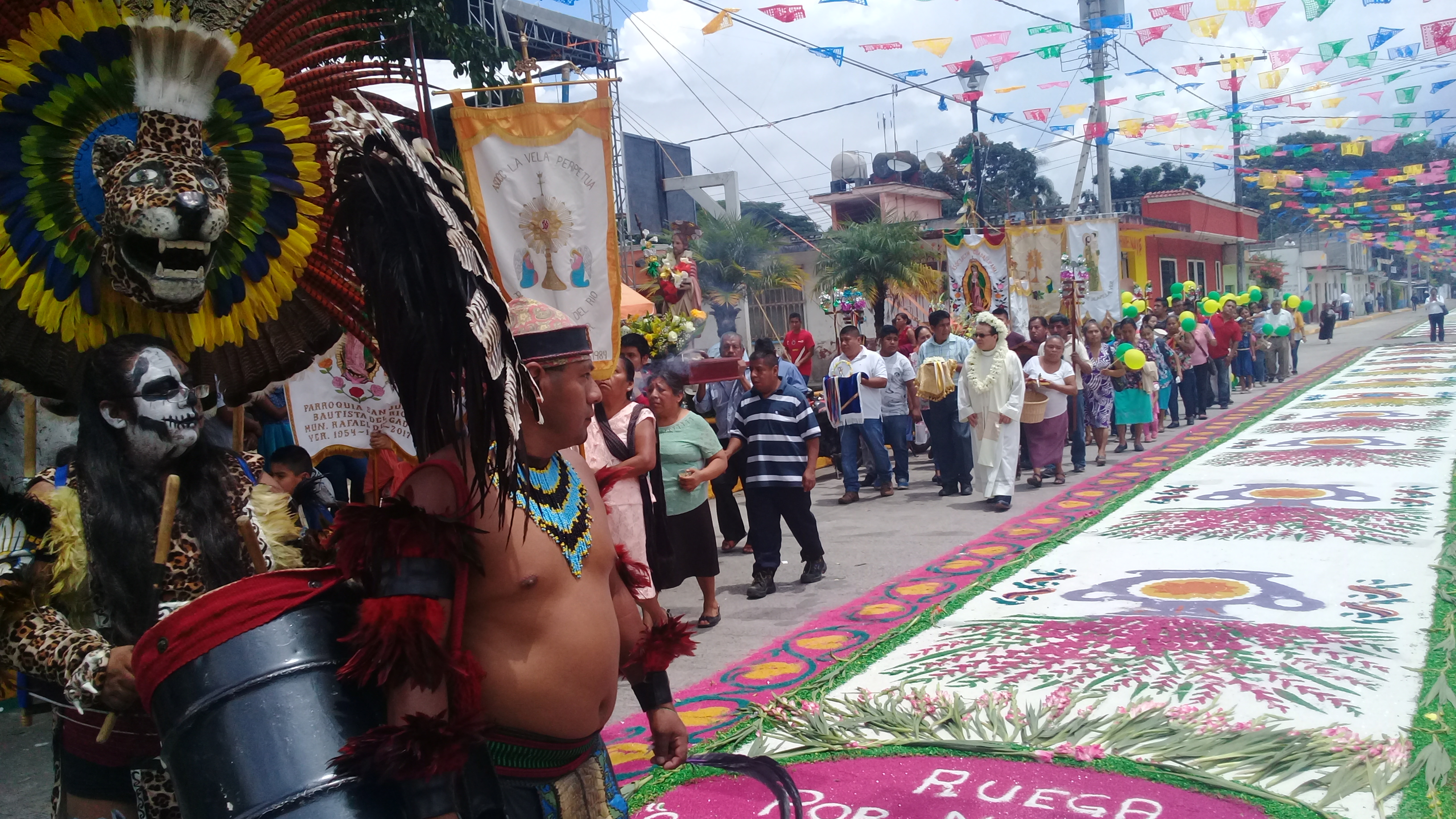
- Procession celebrating John the Baptitst in Rafael Delgado
- Etymology: for Rafael Delgado
- Location within Veracruz Location within Mexico
- Coordinates: 18°49′N 97°04′W
- Country: Mexico
- State: Veracruz

Population (2020)(municipality)
  - Total: 24,127
- Time zone: UTC-6 (Zona Centro)
- Website: rafaeldelgado.gob.mx

Rafael Delgado, former known as San Juan del Río, is a municipality located in the mountainous central zone of the Mexican state of Veracruz, about 140 km from the state capital Xalapa. It has an area of 39.48 square kilometres (15.24 mi^{2}) and, in the 2020 census, reported a population of 24,127.

In 1831, the village of San Juan del Río constituted a municipality. By decree, on November 5, 1932, the municipality adopted its current name, in honor of the author Rafael Delgado, a native of nearby Córdoba.

== Geography ==
The municipality is bordered to the north by Orizaba and Ixmatlahuacan, to the east by Ixtaczoquitlán, to the south by San Andrés Tenejapan, Tlilapan and Nogales, and to the west by Río Blanco. It is irrigated by the Río Blanco river.

The weather in Rafael Delgado is cold and wet all year, with rains in summer and autumn.

== Agriculture ==
The municipality produces principally maize, sugarcane and coffee.

== Celebrations ==
Every June, a celebration is held in honor of San Juan de la Concepción, patron of the town, and in December the town holds festivities in honor of the Virgin of Guadalupe.
