= Tlilapan =

- Municipality and town
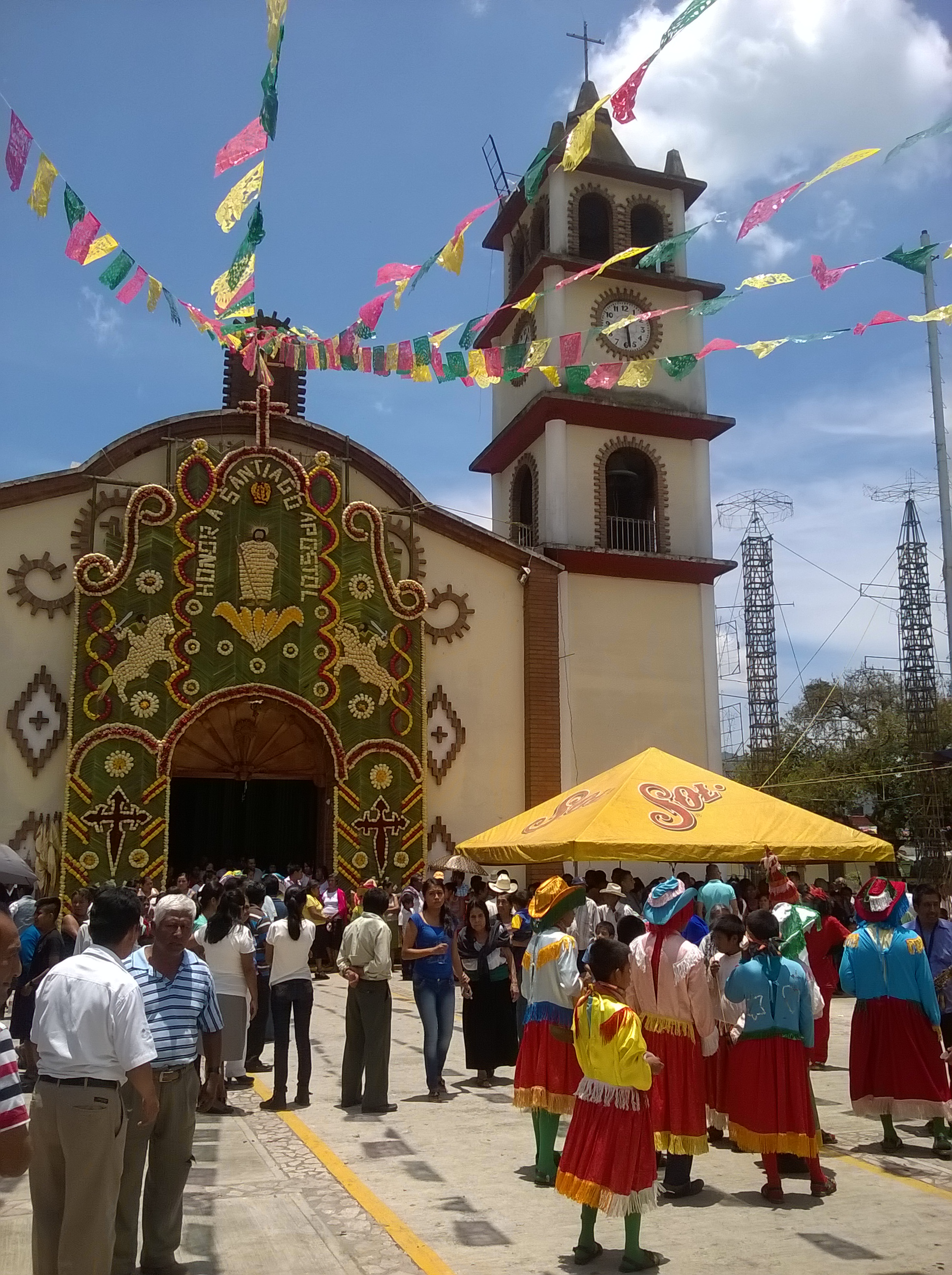
- Church of Santiago Apostol, Tlilapan

- Location in Mexico
- Coordinates: 18°48′N 97°06′W
- Country: Mexico
- State: Veracruz

Area
  - Total: 23.85 km^{2} (9.21 sq mi)

Population (2005)
  - Total: 4,536
- Time zone: UTC-6 (Central Standard Time)

Tlilapan is a municipality located in the central zone in the Mexican state of Veracruz, about 85 kilometres (53 mi) from the state capital of Xalapa. It has an area of 23.85 square kilometres (9.21 sq mi). It is located at 18°48′N 97°06′W. The name comes from the Nahuatl language, meaning "Black creek". The village has existed since the 16th century and, following national independence, and was designated a municipality along with Orizaba, San Andrés Tenejapan, San Francisco Necoxtla, and San Juan del Rio. The municipal cemetery was established in 1880 and, in 1916 the first Municipal President was named.

== Geography ==
The municipality of Tlilapan is bordered to the north by Rafael Delgado, to the south by Huiloapan de Cuauhtémoc and to the west by Nogales. It is watered by small rivers such as the Río Blanco.

The climate of Tlilapan is temperate, with abundant rainfall in summer and autumn.

== Agriculture ==
The chief agricultural products of Tlilapan are maize, coffee and sugarcane.

== Celebrations ==
In July, the celebration of Santiago Apostol, patron of the town, takes place, and in December a celebration takes place in honor of the Virgen de Guadalupe.
