= Judith Vázquez Saut =

Mexican politician

- Born: 30 December 1977 (age 48); San Juan Evangelista, Veracruz, Mexico
- Occupation: Politician
- Political party: PRI
- Family: Regina Vázquez Saut (sister)

Judith Fabiola Vázquez Saut (born 30 December 1977) is a Mexican politician from the Institutional Revolutionary Party (PRI).

In the 2009 mid-terms she was elected to the Chamber of Deputies to represent Veracruz's 20th district during the 61st Congress; however, she resigned her seat on 16 March 2010 and was replaced by her substitute, Rafael Rodríguez González.

She is the daughter of Cirilo Vázquez Lagunes, an assassinated cattle baron.
