= Nogales, Veracruz =

Nogales (Nahuatl: Oztoticpac)
- City and municipal seat
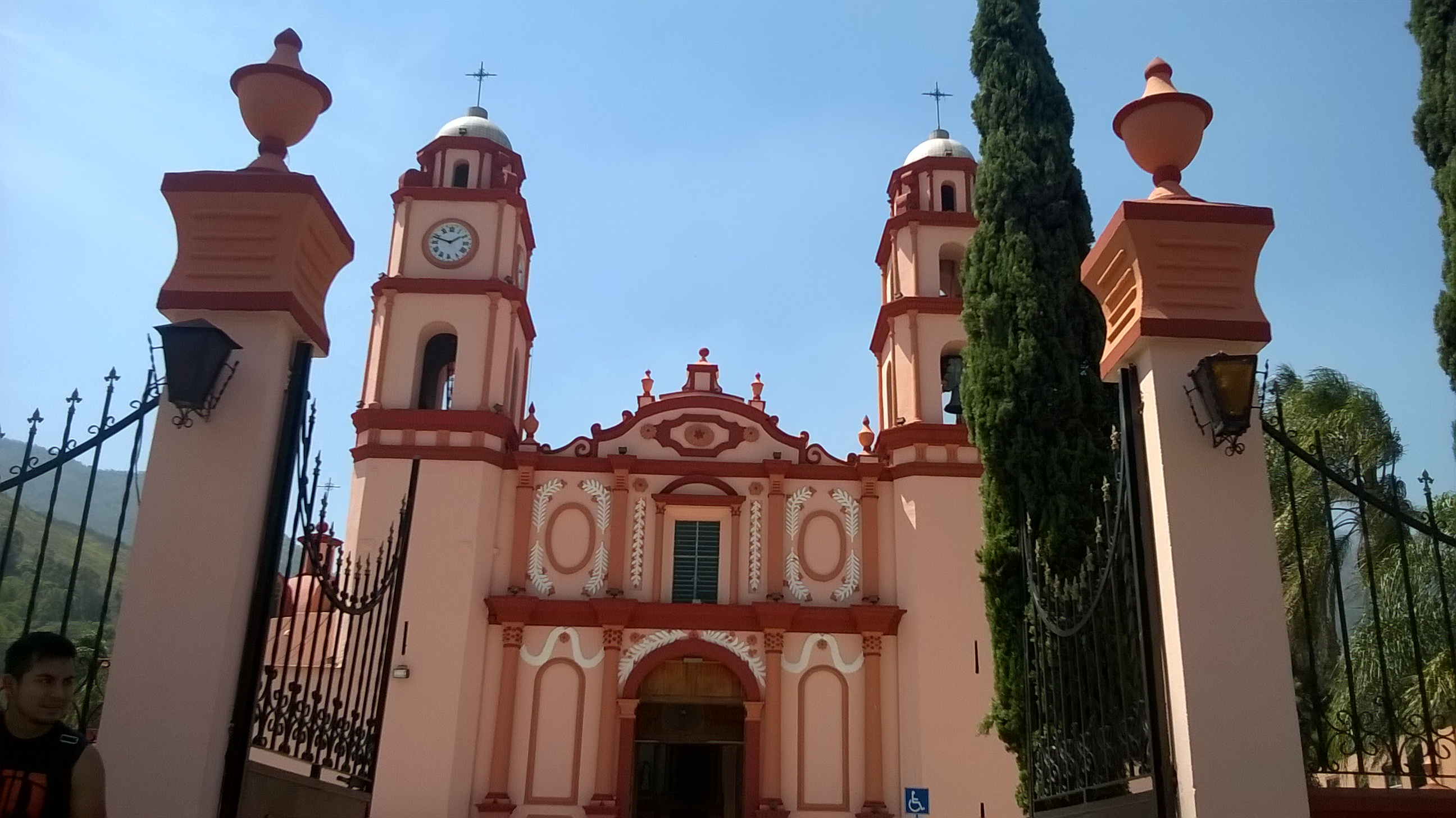
- Parroquia de San Juan Bautista

- Location in Mexico Nogales (Mexico)
- Coordinates: 18°49′0″N 97°10′0″W
- Country: Mexico
- State: Veracruz
- Municipality: Nogales

Government
  - Municipal President: Ernesto Torres Navarro (AFV), 2022-2025
- Elevation: 1,280 m (4,200 ft)

Population (2020)
  - Total: 21,261
- Website: http://www.nogales.gob.mx

Nogales is a city in the mountainous western region of the Mexican state of Veracruz. It serves as the municipal seat for the surrounding municipality of Nogales.

It is situated at 18°49′N 97°10′W, at an altitude of 1280 m. In the 2005 INEGI Census, the city reported a total population of 21,113.

The name "Nogales" is the Spanish for walnut trees.

== History ==
This part of the future state of Veracruz was brought under Aztec sway in or around 1450 under Emperor Moctezuma Ilhuicamina. Following the Spanish conquest of Mexico, the area was awarded to the conquistador Ojeda el Tuerto. Ojeda introduced sugar cane into the area, and the San Juan Bautista Nogales sugar mill – one of the earliest, if not the very first on the American continent – was later established there.

In 1627, Rodrigo de Vivero y Aberrucia, owner of the sugar mill at the time, was named the First Count of the Valley of Orizaba by Philip III of Spain.

On 27 October 1812, during the War of Independence, the sugar mill was taken by surprise by General José María Morelos, who used it as a staging post for his attack on the royalist forces in Orizaba the next day.

On 14 June 1862, with the invading French army stationed in Orizaba, General Ignacio Zaragoza set up his headquarters in Nogales.

On 7 January 1907, in the years of tension leading up to the Mexican Revolution, Nogales textile workers protesting their treatment by French textile-mill owners were massacred by the federal troops of President Porfirio Díaz.

In 1910, Nogales was awarded the status of a town (villa) and, in 1971, city status (ciudad).

== Notable people ==
- Heriberto Jara Corona (1879–1968), Governor of Veracruz from 1924 to 1927, recipient of the Senate's Belisario Domínguez Medal.
