= Regina Vázquez Saut =

Mexican politician

- Born: 11 September 1981 (age 44); Acayucan, Veracruz, Mexico
- Occupation: Deputy
- Political party: PRIPAN
- Family: Judith Vázquez Saut (sister)

Regina Vázquez Saut (born 11 September 1981) is a Mexican politician. She has been elected to the Chamber of Deputies to represent Veracruz's 20th district on two occasions: in the 2003 mid-terms, for the National Action Party (PAN), and in the 2012 general election, for the Institutional Revolutionary Party (PRI).

She is the daughter of Cirilo Vázquez Lagunes, an assassinated cattle baron.
