= Gulf Coastal Plain =

Coastal Plain in the Southern United States and Eastern Mexico

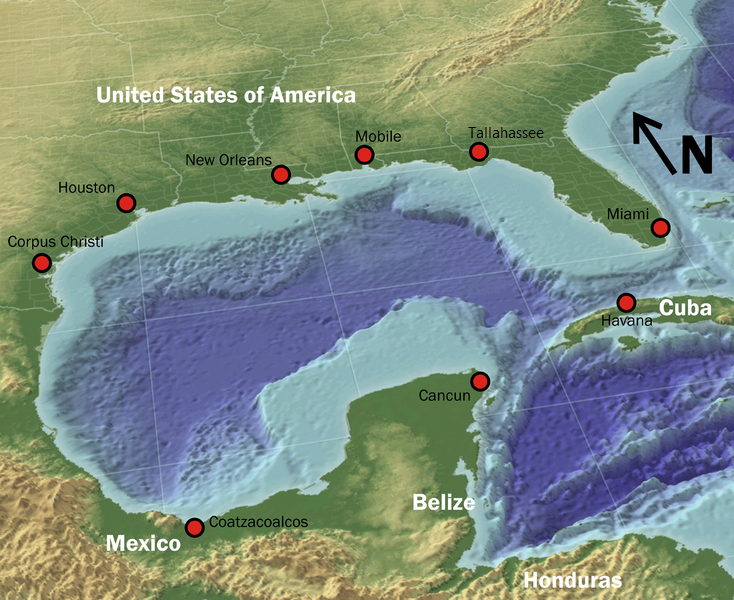
The Gulf of Mexico and Coastal Plain

The Gulf Coastal Plain extends around the Gulf of Mexico in the Southern United States and eastern Mexico.

This coastal plain reaches from the Florida Panhandle, southwest Georgia, the southern two-thirds of Alabama, over most of Mississippi, western Tennessee and Kentucky, extreme southern Illinois, the Missouri Bootheel, eastern and southern Arkansas, all of Louisiana, the southeast corner of Oklahoma, and easternmost Texas in the United States. It continues along the Gulf in northeastern and eastern Mexico, through Tamaulipas and Veracruz to Tabasco and the Yucatán Peninsula on the Bay of Campeche.

== Geography ==
The Gulf Coastal Plain's southern boundary is the Gulf of Mexico in the U.S. and the Sierra Madre de Chiapas in Mexico. On the north, it extends to the Ouachita Highlands of the Interior Low Plateaus and the southern Appalachian Mountains. Its northernmost extent is along the Mississippi embayment (Mississippi Alluvial Valley) as far north as the southern tip of Illinois. To the east the Gulf coastal plain meets the South Atlantic Coastal Plain in southern Georgia along the basin divide between the rivers flowing into the Gulf and those flowing to the Atlantic and south along the Apalachicola River through the Florida panhandle. The flat to rolling topography is broken by many streams, river riparian areas, and marsh wetlands.

=== United States section ===
The Gulf Coastal Plain is a westward extension of the Atlantic Coastal Plain around the Gulf of Mexico. It is only the lower, seaward part of this region that deserves the name of plain, for there alone is the surface unbroken by hills or valleys. The inner part, initially a plain, has been maturely dissected into an elaborate complex of hills and valleys, usually of increasing altitude and relief as one passes inland. The Gulf Plain features not found in the Atlantic coastal plain are:

- the peninsular extension of the plain in Florida
- the belted arrangement of relief and soils in Alabama and in Texas
- the Mississippi embayment or inland extension of the plain half-way up the course of the Mississippi River to its junction with the Ohio River at Cairo, Illinois, with the Mississippi flood plain there included.

==== Florida peninsula ====
A broad, low crustal arch extends southward at the junction of the Atlantic and Gulf coastal plains. The emerged half of the arch, constitutes the visible lowland peninsula of Florida. The submerged half extends westward under the shallow Florida overlapping waters of the Gulf of Mexico. The northern part of the peninsula is composed largely of a weak limestone.

Here, much of the lowland drainage is underground forming many sinkholes (swallowholes). Many small lakes in the lowland appear to owe their basins to the solution of the limestones. Valuable phosphate deposits occur in certain districts. The southern part of the state includes the Everglades, a large area of low, flat, marshy land, overgrown with tall reedy grass.

The eastern coast is fringed by long-stretching sand reefs, enclosing lagoons so narrow and continuous that they are popularly called rivers. At the southern end of the peninsula is a series of coral islands, known as the Florida Keys. They appear to be due to the forward growth of corals and other lime-secreting organisms towards the strong current of the Gulf Stream from which they obtain their food. The western coast has fewer, shorter off-shore reefs. Much of it is of minutely irregular outline.

==== Alabama – Mississippi belted plain ====
A typical example of a belted coastal plain is found in Alabama and the adjacent part of Mississippi. The plain is here about 150 mi (240 km) wide. The basal formation is chiefly a weak limestone, which has been stripped from its original Alabama innermost extension and worn down to a flat inner lowland of rich black soil, thus gaining the name of the black belt.

The lowland is enclosed by an upland or escarpment, known as Chunnenuggee Ridge, sustained by partly consolidated sandy strata. However, the upland is not continuous, but a maturely dissected escarpment. It has a relatively rapid descent toward the inner lowland, and a very gradual descent to the coast prairies, which become very low, flat and marshy before dipping under the Gulf waters, where they are generally fringed by off-shore reefs.

==== Mississippi embayment ====
The coastal plain extends 500 miles (800 km) inland on the axis of the Mississippi embayment. Its inner border affords admirable examples of topographical discordance where it sweeps northwestward square across the trend of the piedmont belt, the ridges and valleys, and the plateau of the Appalachians. All of which are terminated by dipping gently beneath the unconformable cover of the coastal plain strata. In the same way the western side of the embayment, trending south and southwest, passes along the lower southeastern side of the dissected Ozark plateau of southern Missouri and northern and central Arkansas. The southern Missouri and northern Arkansas Ozark plateau resembles in many ways the Appalachian plateau. The Ozarks and Ouachitas make up the U.S. Interior Highlands, the only major mountainous region between the Rocky Mountains and the Appalachian Mountains.

As the coastal plain turns westward toward Texas, it borders the Ouachita Mountains of Arkansas and Oklahoma and the Arbuckle Mountains in southern Oklahoma. The Ouachitas and the Arbuckles may be considered an analog of and possible extension of the Appalachian fold and crystalline belts.

==== Mississippi drainage basin ====
In the embayment of the coastal plain some low escarpment-like belts of hills with associated strips of lowlands suggest the features of a belted coastal plain. The hilly belt or dissected escarpment determined by the Grand Gulf formation in western Mississippi is the most distinct. Important salt deposits occur in the coastal plain strata near the coast. The most striking feature of the embayment is the broad valley which the Mississippi has eroded across it.

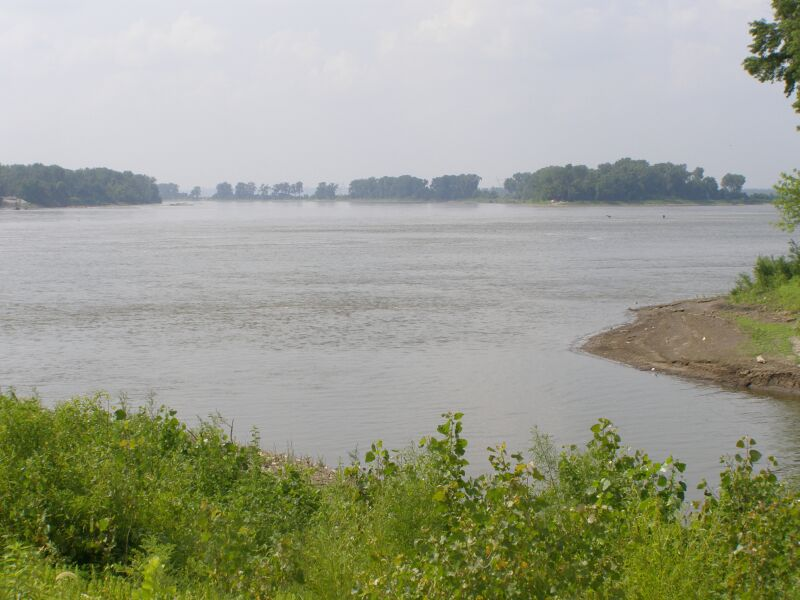
The Missouri River (center) joins with the Upper Mississippi River (right), more than doubling the flow south (left). Wood River, Illinois is in the foreground.

The small proportion of total water volume supplied from the great Missouri River basin is due to the light precipitation in that region. The lower Mississippi has no large tributaries from the lower east, but two important ones come from the west. The Mississippi Arkansas drainage area being a little less than the Ohio River and the basin of the Red River of Louisiana being about half as large. The Mississippi River drains an area of about one-third of the United States. The head of the coastal plain embayment is near the junction of the Ohio and the Mississippi. It flows southward for 560 miles (900 km) through the semi-consolidated strata of the plain. The river has eroded a valley about 40 to 50 miles (64 to 80 km) wide enclosed by bluffs one or two hundred feet high in the northern part. These bluffs decrease towards the south, but with local increase of height associated with a decrease in flood plain breadth on the eastern side where the Grand Gulf escarpment is traversed.

This valley in the coastal plain, with the much narrower rock-walled valley of the upper river in the prairie states, is the true valley of the Mississippi River. However, in popular usage, the Mississippi valley is taken to include a large central part of the Mississippi drainage basin.

The valley floor is covered with a floodplain of fine silt, having a southward slope of only half a foot to a mile (100 mm/km). The length of the river itself, from the Ohio mouth to the Gulf is about 1,060 miles (1,710 km) due to its windings. Its mean fall is about 3 inches per mile (50 mm/km). On account of the rapid deposition of sediment near the main channel at times of overflow, the flood plain, as is normally the case on mature valley floors, has a lateral slope of as much as 5, 10, or even 12 ft (3.7 m) in the first mile from the river, but this soon decreases to a less amount. Thus just a short distance from the river, the flood plain is often swampy, unless its surface is there aggraded by the tributary streams. For this reason Louisiana, Arkansas and Mississippi rank immediately after Florida in swamp area.

The great river receives an abundant load of silt from its tributaries, and takes up and lays down silt from its own bed and banks with every change of velocity. The swiftest current follows the outer side of every significant curve in the channel. Thus the concave bank on the side of the fastest part of the river is worn away. Any chance irregularity is exaggerated, and in time a series of large serpentines or meanders is developed, the most-symmetrical examples at present being those near Greenville, Mississippi. The growth of the meanders tends to give the river continually increasing length. This tendency is counteracted by the sudden occurrence of cut-offs from time to time, so that a fairly constant length is maintained.

The floods of the Mississippi usually occur in spring or summer. Owing to the great size of the drainage basin, it seldom happens that the three upper tributaries are simultaneously flooded. It is a serious problem for the lower river if two of the large tributaries flood at the same time. In this case, the lower river will rise to 30, 40 or even 50 feet (15 m). The fall of the river is significantly steepened and its velocity is accelerated down stream from the point of highest rise. Conversely, the fall and the velocity are both diminished up stream from the same point.

The load of silt carried down stream by the river finally, after many halts on the way, reaches the waters of the Gulf. There, the decrease of velocity aided by the salinity of the sea water, causes the formation of a remarkable delta, leaving less aggraded areas as shallow lakes (Lake Pontchartrain on the east, and Grand Lake on the west of the river). The ordinary triangular form of deltas, due to the smoothing of the delta front by sea action, is here wanting, because of the weakness of sea action in comparison with the strength of the current in each of the four distributaries or passes into which the river divides near its mouth.

==== Coastal plain in Louisiana and Texas ====
After constriction from the Mississippi embayment to 250 miles (400 km) in western Louisiana, the coastal plain continues southwestward with this breadth until it narrows to about 130 miles (210 km) in southern Texas near the crossing of the Colorado River (Texas Colorado River, not the Colorado River that flows through the Grand Canyon), but it again widens to 300 miles (480 km) at the national boundary as a joint effect of embayment up the valley of the Rio Grande and of the seaward advance of this river's rounded delta front. These several changes take place in a distance of about 500 miles (800 km). It includes a region of over 100,000 square miles (260,000 km^{2}), less than half of the large state of Texas. A belted arrangement of reliefs and soils, resulting from differential erosion on strata of unlike composition and resistance, characterizes almost the entire area of the coastal plain. Most of the plain is treeless prairie, but the sandier belts are forested. Two of them are known as cross timbers, because their trend is transverse to the general course of the main consequent rivers. An inland extension from the coastal plain in north-central Texas leads to a large escarpment known as Grand Prairie (not structurally included in the coastal plain), upheld at altitudes of 1,200 or 1,300 ft (400 m) by a resistant Cretaceous limestone. This dips gently seaward with its scalloped inland-facing escarpment overlooking a denuded central prairie region of irregular structure and form. Its gentle coastward slope of 16 ft (4.9 m) per mile (3 m/km) is dissected by many branching consequent streams. In its southernpart as it approaches the Colorado river, the escarpment is dissected into a belt of discontinuous hills. The western cross timbers follow a sandy belt along the inner base of the ragged escarpment of Grand Prairie. The eastern cross timbers follow another sandy belt in the lowland between the eastern slope of Grand Prairie and the pale western escarpment of the immediately eastward and lower Black Prairie escarpment. This escarpment is supported at an altitude of 700 ft (210 m) or less by a chalk formation, which gives an infacing slope some 200 ft (61 m) in height.

Its gently undulating or rolling seaward slope of 2 or 3 ft per mile (500 mm/km), covered with marly strata and rich black soil, determines an important cotton district. Then comes the East Texas timber belt, broad in the northeast, narrowing to a point before reaching the Rio Grande, a low and thoroughly dissected escarpment of sandy Eocene strata. This is followed by the Coast Prairie, a very young plain, with a seaward slope of less than 2 ft per mile (400 mm/km), its smooth surface interrupted only by the still more nearly level flood plains of the shallow, consequent river valleys. Near the Colorado river, the dissected escarpment of the Grand Prairie passes southward changing to a more nearly horizontal structure into the dissected Edwards plateau. The Edwards plateau is referred to later as part of the Great Plains. The plateau terminates in a maturely dissected fault scarp approximately 300 or 400 feet (120 m) in height as the northern boundary of the Rio Grande embayment. From the Colorado to the Rio Grande, the Black Prairie, the timber belt and the Coast Prairie merge in a vast plain, little differentiated, overgrown with chaparral (shrub-like trees, often thorny), widening eastward in the Rio Grande delta and extending southward into Mexico.

Although the Coast Prairie is a sea bottom of very modern uplift, it appears already to have suffered a slight movement of depression. Its small rivers all enter embayments. However, the larger rivers seem to have counteracted the encroachment of the sea on the land by a sufficiently active delta building with a resulting forward growth of the land into the sea. The Mississippi has already been mentioned as rapidly building forward its digitate delta. The Rio Grande, next in size, has built its delta about 50 miles (80 km) forward from the general coastline. Since this river is much smaller than the Mississippi, its delta front is rounded by seashore effects. In front of the Brazos and the Colorado, the largest of the Texan rivers, the coast-line is very gently bowed forward as if by delta growth. The sea touches the mainland in a nearly straight shore line. Nearly all the rest of the coast is fringed by off-shore reefs or barrier islands, built up by waves from the very shallow sea bottom. Due to the weak tides, the barrier islands continue in long unbroken stretches between the few inlets.

== Habitats ==
The northern region uplands are dominated by pine, originally longleaf and slash in the south and shortleaf mixed with hardwoods in the north. These are wildfire-maintained systems that give way to loblolly pine and hardwoods in damper areas and bottomland hardwood forest in extensive lowland drainages. The southern region has tropical and subtropical moist broadleaf forests and western Gulf coastal grasslands. They include large habitats of freshwater wetlands, salt marshes, and coastal mangrove swamps. Much of the lower elevation Gulf Coastal Plain supports wintering waterfowl.

== Groundwater ==
A global satellite study by German and USA scientists spanning the last decade indicates groundwater resources are shrinking due to overuse causing regional water security uncertainty in a changing climate. Surface water quality is declining due to increasing population, depleted streams, and land subsidence along certain coastlines. The Atlantic and Gulf Coastal Plain Aquifer is considered to have low to moderate stress, but the region's economic capacity and land-use patterns signal trends toward a human-dominated stress on water resources.
