= Nogales Municipality, Veracruz =

Coordinates: 18°49′0″N 97°10′0″W

Nogales
- Municipality
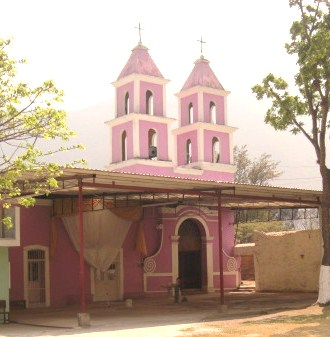
- Parroquia San Isidro Labrador

- Location in Mexico Nogales (Mexico)
- Country: Mexico
- State: Veracruz
- Municipal seat: Nogales

Government
  - Municipal President: Ernesto Torres Navarro, 2022-24

Area
  - Total: 77.32 km^{2} (29.85 sq mi)
- Elevation: 1,280 m (4,200 ft)

Population (2020)
  - Total: 37,314
  - Density: 482.6/km^{2} (1,250/sq mi)
- Website: www.nogales.gob.mx

Nogales is a municipality in the mountainous western region of the Mexican state of Veracruz. The municipal seat is the city of Nogales.

It is situated at, at an altitude of 1280 m, and covers a total surface area of 77.32 km^{2}. In the year 2005 INEGI Census, the municipality reported a total population of 31,818. Of the municipality's inhabitants, 1,286 (4.67%) spoke an indigenous language, primarily Nahuatl.

The name "Nogales" is the Spanish for walnut trees.

== The Lake of Nogales ==
Is spa that is supplied water of fresh spring and is transparent forming a dam that is divided by small rivers. Infantile account with vestidores, games, areas of parking, rent of boats and sale of antojitos. Cerro de Huilapan, can be in wild form the following species: wild cat, tigrillo, squirrel, tejón, hare and great variety of birds.

== History ==
This part of the future state of Veracruz was brought under Aztec sway in or around 1450 under Emperor Moctezuma Ilhuicamina. Following the Spanish conquest of Mexico, the area was awarded to the conquistador Ojeda el Tuerto. Ojeda introduced sugar cane into the area, and the San Juan Bautista Nogales sugar mill – one of the earliest, if not the very first on the American continent – was later established there.

In 1627, Rodrigo de Viveros y Aberrucia, owner of the sugar mill at the time, was named the First Count of the Valley of Orizaba by Philip III of Spain.

In 1910, the city of Nogales was awarded the status of a town (villa) and, in 1971, city status (ciudad).
