= Channel 13 =

Channel 13 or TV13 may refer to:

== Argentina ==
- 13 Max Televisión, a television station in Corrientes, Argentina
- Channel 13 – Santa Fe, a television station in Santa Fe de la Vera Cruz, Argentina
- Channel 13 (Río Grande, Argentina)
- Channel 13 (Río Cuarto, Argentina)
- El Trece, an Argentinian TV channel in Buenos Aires, Argentina
- San Luis +

== Mexico ==
The following television stations are authorized to use virtual channel 13 in Mexico:

=== Canal 13 ===
- XHBG-TDT in Uruapan, Michoacán
- XHCVP-TDT in Coatzacoalcos, Veracruz
- XHDY-TDT in San Cristóbal de las Casas, Chiapas
- XHGK-TDT in Tapachula, Chiapas
- XHTMBR-TDT in Veracruz, Veracruz
- XHTMCA-TDT in Campeche, Campeche
- XHTMCC-TDT in Ciudad del Carmen, Campeche
- XHTMNL-TDT in Agualeguas, Nuevo León
- XHTMPT-TDT in Puebla, Puebla
- XHTMQR-TDT in Chetumal, Quintana Roo
- XHTMVE-TDT in Xalapa, Veracruz
- XHTMYC-TDT in Mérida, Yucatán
- XHTMYU-TDT in Tizimín-Valladolid, Yucatán
- XHTVL-TDT in Villahermosa, Tabasco

=== Other stations ===
- XHCTRM-TDT (Imagen Televisión in Reynosa, Tamaulipas)
- XHMH-TDT in Hidalgo del Parral, Chihuahua
- XHDUH-TDT (Nu9ve subchannel) in Durango, Durango
- XHDE-TDT in San Luis Potosí, San Luis Potosí

== Other countries ==
- Calle 13 (TV channel), a cable/satellite television channel in Spain
- CCTV-13, news channel of China Central Television, People's Republic of China
- Channel 13 (Israel), a television station in Israel
- Canal 13 (Chilean TV channel), a Chilean free-to-air television channel
- Canal 13 (Costa Rican TV channel), a Costa Rican television channel
- Canal Trece (Colombian TV channel), a Colombian free-to-air television channel
- Global Television (Peruvian TV network), formerly Canal 13, a Peruvian free-to-air television channel
- Intercontinental Broadcasting Corporation (IBC 13), a Filipino commercial television network
  - Islands TV-13, a television network
  - DZTV-TV, the flagship station of the IBC in Metro Manila, Philippines
- Public Television Service, a public television service in Taiwan
- Trece (Paraguayan television network), formerly RPC, a Paraguayan free-to-air television channel
- Viva Nicaragua, a Nicaraguan television channel
- WNET, sometimes referred to as "Thirteen", in Newark, New Jersey, serving the New York City metropolitan area; a primary station of the Public Broadcasting Service
- WORO-TV, a religious television station in San Juan, Puerto Rico

== See also ==
- Canal 13 (disambiguation)
- Channel 13 branded TV stations in the United States
- Channel 13 virtual TV stations in Canada
- Channel 13 virtual TV stations in the United States

For VHF frequencies covering 210-216 MHz:

- Channel 13 TV stations in Canada
- Channel 13 digital TV stations in the United States
- Channel 13 low-power TV stations in the United States
