= List of television stations in Chiapas =

The following is a list of all IFT-licensed over-the-air television stations broadcasting in the Mexican state of Chiapas. There are 31 television stations in Chiapas.

== List of television stations ==
RF	VC	Call sign	Location	Network/name	ERP	Concessionaire
27	1	XHOMC-TDT	Arriaga	Azteca Uno (adn40)	5 kW	Televisión Azteca
32	2/5	XHWVT-TDT	Tonalá; Arriaga	Las Estrellas	20 kW; 18 kW	Televimex
34	2/5	XHCIC-TDT	Cintalapa de Figueroa	Las Estrellas (Canal 5)	15 kW	Televimex
35	1	XHDZ-TDT	Comitán de Dominguez	Azteca Uno (adn40)	4.48 kW	Televisión Azteca
23	2	XHCMZ-TDT	Comitán de Dominguez	Las Estrellas	32 kW	Televimex
22	5/9	XHCZC-TDT	Comitán de Dominguez	Canal 5 (Nu9ve)	32 kW	Radio Televisión
30	7	XHCOM-TDT	Comitán de Dominguez	Azteca 7	4.55 kW	Televisión Azteca
32	2/5	XHHUC-TDT	Huixtla	Las Estrellas (Canal 5)	40 kW	Televimex
25	7	XHMCH-TDT	Motozintla	Azteca 7	5.35 kW	Televisión Azteca
32	2	XHOCC-TDT	Ocosingo	Las Estrellas	39 kW	Televimex
14	1	XHAO-TDT	San Cristóbal de las Casas; Tuxtla Gutiérrez	Azteca Uno (adn40)	46.1 kW; 58.31 kW	Televisión Azteca
16	2	XHSCC-TDT	San Cristóbal de las Casas	Las Estrellas (FOROtv)	30 kW	Televimex
17	5/9	XHSNC-TDT	San Cristóbal de las Casas	Canal 5 (Nu9ve)	30 kW	Radio Televisión
15	7	XHCSA-TDT	San Cristóbal de las Casas; Tuxtla Gutiérrez	Azteca 7 (a+)	46.29 kW; 58.47 kW	Televisión Azteca
36	13	XHDY-TDT	San Cristóbal de las Casas	Telsusa (Canal 13) (TN23)	160 kW	Comunicación del Sureste
18	14	XHSPRSC-TDT	San Cristóbal de las Casas	SPR multiplex (11.1 Canal Once, 14.1 Canal Catorce, 14.2 Ingenio Tv, 20.1 TV UNAM, 22.1 Canal 22, 45.1 Canal del Congreso)	4.29 kW	Sistema Público de Radiodifusión del Estado Mexicano
30	1	XHTAP-TDT	Tapachula	Azteca Uno (adn40)	51.44 kW	Televisión Azteca
23	2	XHAA-TDT	Tapachula	Las Estrellas	62 kW	Televimex
29	3	XHCTTH-TDT	Tapachula	Imagen Televisión (Excélsior TV)	54.192 kW	Cadena Tres I, S.A. de C.V.
34	5/9	XHTAH-TDT	Tapachula	Canal 5 (Nu9ve)	62 kW	Radio Televisión
36	7	XHJU-TDT	Tapachula	Azteca 7 (a+)	51.08 kW	Televisión Azteca
28	13	XHGK-TDT	Tapachula	Telsusa (Canal 13) (TN23)	80 kW	Comunicación del Sureste
26	14	XHSPRTP-TDT	Tapachula	SPR multiplex (11.1 Canal Once, 14.1 Canal Catorce, 20.1 TV UNAM, 22.1 Canal 22)	7.39 kW	Sistema Público de Radiodifusión del Estado Mexicano
30	7	XHTON-TDT	Tonalá	Azteca 7	4.21 kW	Televisión Azteca
29	2	XHTUA-TDT	Tuxtla Gutiérrez	Las Estrellas (5.1 Canal 5, 9.1 Nu9ve)	45 kW	Televimex
27	3	XHCTCR-TDT	Tuxtla Gutiérrez; San Cristóbal de las Casas	Imagen Televisión (Excélsior TV)	40 kW; 10 kW	Cadena Tres I, S.A. de C.V.
24	8	XHTX-TDT	Tuxtla Gutiérrez		45 kW	Telemisión
20	10	XHTTG-TDT	Tuxtla Gutiérrez; Comitán de Domínguez; San Cristóbal de las Casas (RF 19); Tapachula (RF 33)	Canal 10 Chiapas (Ingenio Tv)	34.21 kW; 0.94 kW; 4.96 kW; 27.12 kW	Gobierno del Estado de Chiapas
7	12	XHTUG-TDT	Tuxtla Gutiérrez		5 kW	Simón Valanci Buzali
31	14	XHSPRTC-TDT	Tuxtla Gutiérrez	SPR multiplex (11.1 Canal Once, 14.1 Canal Catorce, 14.2 Ingenio Tv, 20.1 TV UNAM, 22.1 Canal 22, 45.1 Canal del Congreso)	8.96 kW	Sistema Público de Radiodifusión del Estado Mexicano
28	2/5	XHVAC-TDT	Venustiano Carranza	Las Estrellas (Canal 5)	22 kW	Televimex
26	2/5	XHVFC-TDT	Villaflores	Las Estrellas (Canal 5)	20 kW	Televimex
