= Canal 13 =

Canal 13 (Spanish for Channel 13) may refer to:

- Canal 13 (Argentina), television network from Buenos Aires, Argentina
- Canal 13 (Chile), television network from Santiago, Chile
- Canal 13 (Colombia), television network from Colombia
- Canal 13 (Costa Rica), a public television station in Costa Rica
- Canal 13 (Guatemala), television network from Guatemala owned by Remigio Ángel González
- Canal 13 (Mexico), a regional television network in parts of Mexico
- Canal 13 (Paraguay), television network that aired the OTI Festival singing competition in Paraguay
- WORO-DT, a television station in Puerto Rico

== See also ==
- Channel 13 (disambiguation)
- Canal (disambiguation)
