= National University of Tierra del Fuego =

Coordinates: 54°48′24″S 68°19′14″W

National University of Tierra del Fuego, Antarctica and South Atlantic Islands
- Universidad Nacional de Tierra del Fuego, Antártida e Islas del Atlántico Sur
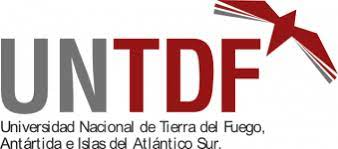
- Other name: UNTDF
- Type: Public
- Established: 2010
- Chancellor: Dr. Mariano Hermida
- Vice-Chancellor: Lic. Juan Ignacio García
- Students: 4.500 (2024)
- Location: Fuegia Basket 251, Ushuaia, Province of Tierra del Fuego, Antarctica and South Atlantic Islands, Argentina, Ushuaia, Tierra del Fuego Province, Argentina
- Campus: Suburban
- Website: www.untdf.edu.ar

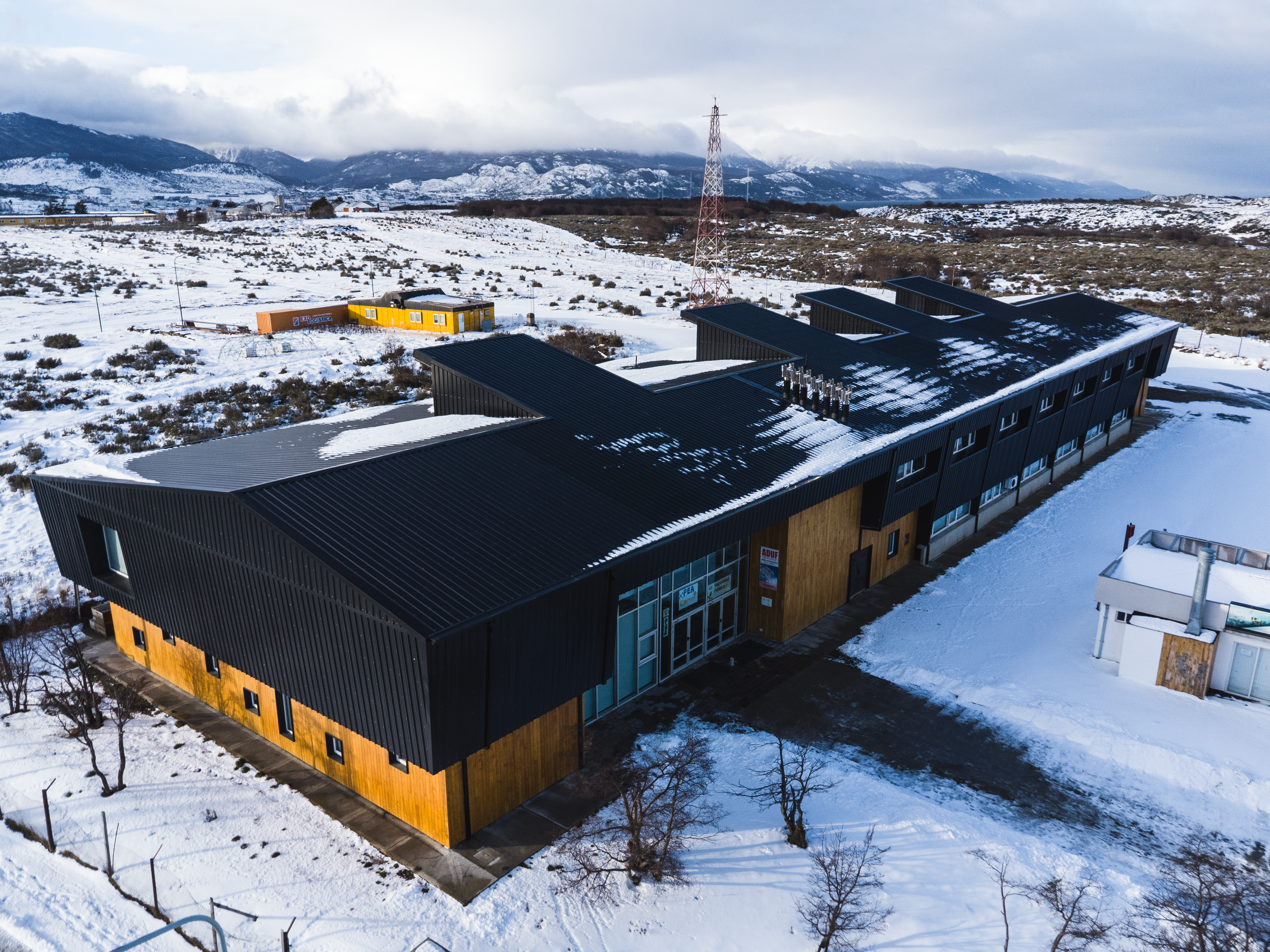
Campus Libertador Gral. San Martín of the National University of Tierra del Fuego in Ushuaia.

The National University of Tierra del Fuego, Antarctica and South Atlantic Islands (UNTDF) is an Argentine national university located in the Province of Tierra del Fuego, Antarctica and South Atlantic Islands. The university's main campus is located in the city of Ushuaia, with a subsidiary campus in Río Grande. It has facilities in the city of Ushuaia (the main building is located at Av. Yrigoyen 879) and in the city of Río Grande (Thorne Street 302).

== History ==
The National University of Tierra del Fuego, Antarctica and South Atlantic Islands was created by Law No. 26,559, enacted on November 18, 2009, and effectively promulgated on December 16 of the same year. Its establishment took place within the framework of the expansion process of the Argentine national university system, particularly aimed at strategic regions with lower institutional density.

According to the provisions of the law, the UNTDF was established based on the transformation of the Ushuaia campus of the National University of Patagonia San Juan Bosco, with the transfer of its infrastructure, teaching and non-teaching staff, and educational services. The process was accompanied by a special commission made up of representatives from the Ministry of Education of the Argentine Nation, the originating university, and the organizing team of the new educational institution.

The first organizing rector was Dr. Roberto Domecq, who had already served this same role at the National University of General Sarmiento. During his tenure, the institutional project was designed and the statute was formulated that led to the normalization of the university.

The UNTDF began its academic activities in 2010 and, from its inception, maintained a strong connection with the territorial demands of the Province of Tierra del Fuego, Antarctica, and South Atlantic Islands, directing its educational offerings and institutional development towards applied research and regional strengthening.

In 2015, the University Assembly elected Engineer Juan José Castelucci as the first normalized rector, followed by Dr. Daniel Fernández in 2021. In May 2025, Dr. Mariano Hermida was elected as rector, accompanied by Lic. Juan Ignacio García as vice-rector, for the period 2025–2029.

The UNTDF was conceived with the purpose of promoting scientific, educational, and cultural development in the southernmost region of the country, considered strategic due to its proximity to Antarctica and its geopolitical importance in the South Atlantic. It has campuses in the cities of Ushuaia and Río Grande, allowing comprehensive coverage of the Fuegian territory.

Currently, the university offers 26 undergraduate, graduate, and postgraduate programs, structured in institutes that address areas such as economic development and innovation, culture and territory, and polar sciences and southern environments. The creation law also contemplated initial funding of up to fifteen million pesos, and prioritized the construction of educational infrastructure in Río Grande.

The UNTDF is established as a player in the expansion of higher education and in the generation of knowledge in territories of high strategic relevance for the Argentine Republic.

== Institutes and academic offerings ==
The UNTDF has four academic units where academic offerings and research are organized:

- Institute of Economic Development and Innovation (IDEI)
- Institute of Culture, Society, and State (ICSE)
- Institute of Education and Culture (IEC)
- Institute of Polar Sciences, Environment, and Natural Resources (ICPA)

=== Undergraduate and pre-undergraduate academic offerings ===
Undergraduate and graduate degree programs at UNTDF, including the Degrees Completion Programs:

Academic Unit	Undergraduate and Graduate Degrees
Institute of Economic Development and Innovation (IDEI)	Bachelor's in Public Accounting; Bachelor's Degree in Economics; Bachelor's Degree in Business Management; Bachelor's in Industrial Engineering; Associate Degree in Accounting; Bachelor's Degree in Tourism; Associate Degree in Tourism; Bachelor's Degree in Information Systems; University Analyst in Information Systems; Bachelor's Degree in Public Administration (Degree Completion Program); Associate Degree in Application Development
Institute of Culture, Society, and State (ICSE)	B.A in Political Science; B.A in Sociology; B.A in Audiovisual Media; B.A. in Public Security (Degree Completion Program)
Institute of Polar Sciences, Environment, and Natural Resources (ICPA)	B.A in Biology; B.A in Geology; B.A in Environmental Sciences; B.S. in Agroecology Engineering
Institute of Education and Culture (IEC)	Bachelor's Degree in Educational Management (Degree Completion Program); Bachelor's Degree in Primary Education (Degree Completion Program)

Graduate Academic Offerings

Academic Unit	Graduate Programs
Institute of Economic Development and Innovation (IDEI)	Master's Degree in Public Policy for Territorial Development; PhD in Economics (Interinstitutional Doctorate)
Institute of Education and Culture (IEC)	Specialization in Biology Teaching; Specialization in Language and Literature Teaching; Specialization in Mathematics Teaching; PHD in Contemporary Studies in Education (Interinstitutional Doctorate)

It also has a Master's degree in Antarctic Studies offered jointly by the four university institutes. It is a pioneering postgraduate program in the country, aimed at interdisciplinary training focused on the Antarctic region. Created by Resolution (CS) No. 145/2017 and officially recognized by the Ministry of Education through Resolution No. 302/2020, this master's program seeks to address the scientific, geopolitical, environmental, and cultural challenges related to the white continent. Its academic proposal integrates knowledge from social, natural, and legal sciences, and is aimed at professionals from various disciplines interested in Antarctica as a strategic space and international cooperation. The program is taught in person in Ushuaia, with an estimated duration of two years, and includes professional internships and a final integrative project. It was declared of provincial interest by the Tierra del Fuego Legislature in 2020.

== Cultural and communication units ==
=== UNTDF Medios ===
UNTDF Medios is the University's production company that specializes in creating audiovisual content for TV and the Internet, focusing on themes related to the southern region. Since 2013, it has been producing documentaries, TV series, short films, commercials, and magazine programs, among other audiovisual genres.

Its productions have been broadcast on various channels such as: Public Television (TVP), Fuegian Public Television, Encuentro Channel, Pakapaka Channel, and various university channels such as Mundo U, Abra TV, among other media outlets

Among the main themes of its content are "Science and Territory," "History, Identity, and Culture of Tierra del Fuego," "Work in Tierra del Fuego," "Memory, Human Rights, and Inclusion," and "University Life."

The Production Company's Catalog has been uploaded in their YouTube Channel.

=== Casa de las Artes ===
Casa de las Artes is a space at the National University of Tierra del Fuego that assumes the role of articulator between the academic community and society through programs and actions linked to art and culture

=== Radio UNTDF ===
RadioUNTDF is the University's public broadcasting service and communication platform. Through communication, we act as intermediaries between the issues of society, science, culture, and politics, contributing to the social transformation of the region and guaranteeing a plurality and diversity of voices.

Officially inaugurated on October 29, 2015, it operates on a frequency granted by the AFSCA (Federal Authority for Audiovisual Communication Services) Resolution 242/2015 – Act No. 58. This resolution authorizes the UNTDF to install, operate, and broadcast a sound service using frequency modulation on channel 295, frequency 106.9 MHz, category F, with the call sign LRF935, in the city of Río Grande, Tierra del Fuego Province, Antarctica and South Atlantic Islands.

To listen online, you can access the station through the institutional website.

== See also ==
- Science and Education in Argentina
- Argentine Higher Education Official Site
- Argentine Universities
