= XHTVL-TDT =

Television station in Villahermosa, Tabasco

- Villahermosa, Tabasco; Mexico
- Channels: Digital: 30 (UHF); Virtual: 13
- Branding: Canal 13

Programming
- Affiliations: Telsusa; El Nueve; ATV; La Red

Ownership
- Owner: Albavisión; (Tele-Emisoras del Sureste, S.A. de C.V.)

History
- Founded: 1980
- Former call signs: XHTVL-TV (1980-2015)
- Former channel numbers: 9 (analog and digital virtual, 1980–2018)
- Former affiliations: Gala TV; FOROtv
- Call sign meaning: Tabasco/Villahermosa

Technical information
- Licensing authority: CRT
- ERP: 160 kW
- HAAT: 119 m
- Transmitter coordinates: 17°57′17″N 92°56′57″W

Links
- Website: www.canal13mexico.com/Tabasco/

XHTVL-TDT (channel 13) is a television station in Villahermosa, Tabasco, Mexico, the flagship station of the Canal 13 regional network owned by Albavisión. The station carries programs from El Nueve, ATV and La Red.

Established in 1980, XHTVL was the first station in Mexico owned by Remigio Ángel González. It was a regional affiliate partner of Televisa until 2018, in the wake of the progressive disaffiliation of Televisa from its local stations and Albavisión's expansion plans to build a semi-national network.

== History ==
XHTVL's concession was awarded on 23 April 1980. The station broadcast on analog channel 9. Its creation stemmed from XHLL-TV ceasing local programming in 1972, when it became financially unsustainable. It was the initiative of state governor Leandro Rovirosa Wade. In 1977, a feasibility study took place, while construction work for the station's building began in 1978, while in the following year, equipment orders from the United States came. Before starting regular broadcasts, a three tests were conducted: the first of which being the 1979 World Series on 9 October 1979, which was plagued by technical difficulties. On 1 December, the station broadcast coverage of the government's report, while from 9 February, to 30 April 1980, test broadcasts with canned material (national and international) were made.

At the end of the trial period, the station started sending in technicials from Nuevo León, Guanajuato and the Federal District to prepare its staff. On 2 June 1980, the station started regular broadcasts, with a daily schedule running from 12pm to 12am. On 18 November 1980, the first local news program, Notinueve, was broadcast, airing live on weekdays between 2pm and 2:30pm. This was followed on 1 June 1981 by Caleidoscopio, also a half-hour program, airing after the 2pm news, running for one year. Other early local entertainment programs usually lasted for one year, such as Mosaico Dominical (variety show) and Estudio "L" (local music). Mundo Infantil del Nueve was aimed at children and aired between 3 and 4pm, carrying cartoons interspersed with live studio segments. Later, the slot was limited to cartoons.

At the end of 1982, XHTVL installed its relay station in Tenosique, XHTOE-TV, channel 12.

At the time, Tele-Emisoras del Sureste was owned by Remigio Ángel González, a Mexican-born entrepreneur who would later accumulate media holdings elsewhere in Latin America, as well as radio station owner Francisco Javier Sánchez Campuzano and Manuel Efraín Abán Méndez, who had placed the winning application for the frequency in 1979, beating out Jorge Kanahuati Gómez and Fernando Laurencio Pazos de la Torre. In 1987, Sánchez Campuzano exited the partnership, as well as his stake in Comunicación del Sureste, a parallel company that owned XHDY and XHGK television in Chiapas.

Regional expansion began not long after. On 24 April 1984, Abán Méndez received the concession for XHTOE-TV channel 12 in Tenosique, which would repeat XHTVL's programming in the southeastern region of Tabasco. In 1993, XHTOE's concession was transferred to Tele-Emisoras del Sureste. In 1985, the Patronato para Instalar Repetidoras de Canales de Televisión de Coatzacoalcos, Veracruz, A.C., a noncommercial group, obtained the permit for XHCVP-TV channel 9 in that city. XHCVP, while a social station, operates as a repeater of XHTVL, and in 2016, it was legally represented by lawyers associated with Albavisión.

XHTVL maintained a partnership with Televisa and carried programming from its Gala TV and Foro TV, and as a Televisa partner, Tele-Emisoras del Sureste is defined as within the "preponderant economic agent" in broadcasting for regulatory purposes. In 2014, XHTVL sourced 82 percent of its broadcast day from Televisa. In 2018, simultaneous events prompted XHTVL to disaffiliate from Televisa. One was the unwinding of many local relationships as Televisa began to multiplex Gala TV and Foro TV on subchannels of its own TV stations in some areas of the country where said programming had been broadcast on a local station, including Villahermosa. Another was the successful participation of Telsusa Televisión México, S.A. de C.V., a company also controlled by Remigio Ángel González, in the IFT-6 television station auction, in which it acquired TV stations in twelve cities primarily in southern and eastern Mexico. In March 2020, the IFT approved an application by Tele-Emisoras del Sureste to be removed from the preponderant economic agent.

On 18 October 2018, XHTVL and XHTOE, as well as their sister stations in Chiapas, moved to virtual channel 13. XHCVP-TDT was not authorized until 15 August 2019 to move to channel 13.

== Programming ==
XHTVL produces Notinueve local newscasts, considered the most important in Tabasco television by media publication Etcétera, which air at 7:30 a.m., 3 p.m. and 9 p.m. Among the most notable on-air personalities of the station was Juan Carlos Huerta, who anchored the late edition of Notinueve. Huerta, a journalist who also hosted a radio show and founded XEGMSR-AM radio, was murdered in a robbery in May 2018.

Since disaffiliating from Televisa, most of XHTVL's entertainment programming has come from Albavisión television channels in other countries, such as El show del problema and the Argentina version of Combate from elnueve and Un amor indomable which was commissioned for ATV and La Red, or been acquired on the international market, such as the Colombian telenovela Lo que diga el corazón. Weekends are taken up by older Mexican movies.

== Repeaters ==
XHTVL-TDT has two satellite stations, one of which has a repeater of its own:

Station	City	RF channel	Virtual channel	ERP	HAAT	Transmitter coordinates
XHTOE-TDT	Tenosique	26	13	55.002 kW	190.3 m	17°24′44″N 91°29′32″W
XHTOE-TDT	Palenque, Chiapas	26	13	1.2 kW	-58.2 m	17°30′30.1″N 91°58′35.7″W
XHCVP-TDT	Coatzacoalcos, Veracruz	20	13	1 kW	50.55 m	18°08′03″N 94°26′15″W
