= XHDY =

XHDY may refer to:

- XHDY-FM, a radio station (107.1 FM) in Ciudad Morelos, Baja California, Mexico
- XHDY-TDT, a television station (channel 36, virtual 13) in San Cristóbal de las Casas, Chiapas, Mexico
