= Twister Telecom =

Coordinates: 19.28394°N 99.654306°W

- Industry: Telecommunication
- Founded: 2008
- Headquarters: Toluca, Mexico
- Area served: Mexico
- Services: Digital TV, Internet access
- Website: twistertelecom.mx

Founded in 2008, Twister Telecom, started operations during 2010, providing the services of digital TV and broadband internet. The headquarters are in the city of Toluca, State of Mexico.

It is part of Grupo Siete, one of the most important telecommunications companies in Mexico, owned by Francisco Javier Sánchez Campuzano.
