= XHBO-TDT =

Television station in Oaxaca, Oaxaca, Mexico

Oaxaca, Oaxaca; Mexico
- Channels: Digital: 32 (UHF); Virtual: 13
- Branding: Canal 13

Programming
- Affiliations: Canal 13

Ownership
- Owner: Albavisión; (Tele-emisoras del Sureste, S.A. de C.V.)

History
- Founded: October 21, 1988 (concession)
- Former call signs: XHBO-TV (1988-2015)
- Former channel numbers: 3 (analog, to 2001); 4 (analog, to 2015 digital, to 2022)

Technical information
- Licensing authority: CRT
- ERP: 102.929 kW
- Transmitter coordinates: 22°09′04″N 100°57′09″W

XHBO-TDT is a television station in Oaxaca, Oaxaca. XHBO broadcasts on virtual channel 13 (physical channel 32). The main transmitter is located on Cerro El Fortín.

== History ==
Radio Oaxaca, S.A., the owner of XEOA (570 AM), received the concession for XHBO-TV on channel 3 on October 21, 1988. XHBO aired limited local programming and programming from XHTV Mexico City. XHBO moved to channel 4 in 2001—which enabled an OPMA transmitter to start up in 2010—and removed almost all local program production. Televisa output, which later came from the Gala TV/Nu9ve network, made up 87 percent of the station's broadcast day, resulting in the station being defined as within the "preponderant economic agent" in broadcasting for regulatory purposes; 80 percent of its programming in 2014 was sourced from the company.

Televisa programming was removed from XHBO in 2018 after the company multiplexed Nu9ve on its own transmitter in Oaxaca.

XHBO airs no local programming. At disaffiliation, it switched to output from La Octava in Mexico City. In October 2021, it changed from La Octava to Canal 6.

In 2022, Albavision acquired XHBO to switch into a Telsusa station, switching to virtual channel 13.

== Repeaters ==
Three repeaters of XHBO-TDT have been authorized to operate by the Federal Telecommunications Institute:

RF	Location	ERP
32	Ejutla de Crespo	.005 kW
32	Ocotlán de Morelos	.05 kW
32	Tlacolula de Matamoros	.5 kW
