= TV Pública Fueguina =

LU 87 TV Canal 11
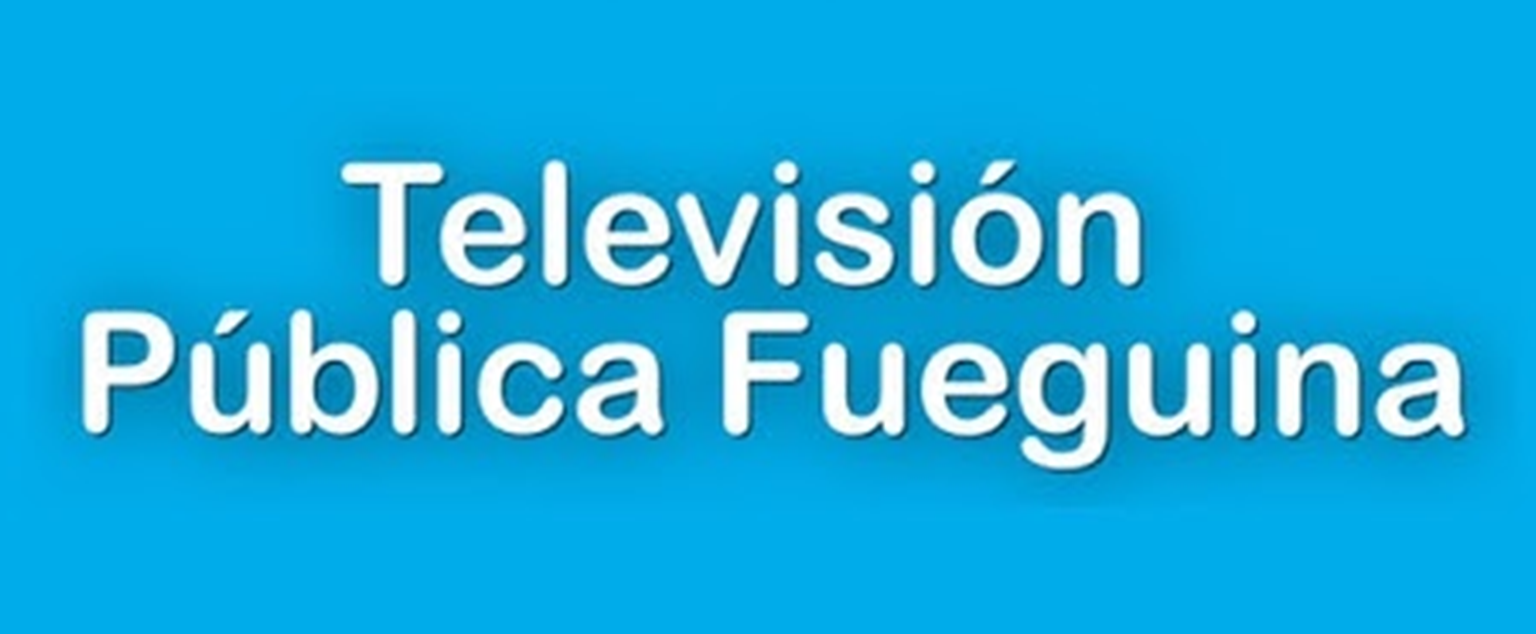
- Ushuaia, Tierra del Fuego; Argentina
- Channels: Analog: 11 (VHF); Digital: 27 (UHF)
- Branding: Televisión Pública Fueguina

Programming
- Affiliations: Televisión Pública

Ownership
- Owner: Government of Tierra del Fuego Province

History
- First air date: October 23, 1967
- Former names: Canal 11 Ushuaia (1967-2016)

Technical information
- Licensing authority: ENACOM

Links
- Website: tvpublicafueguina.com

Televisión Pública Fueguina, better known as Televisión Pública TDF (Televisión Digital Fueguina), is an Argentine over-the-air television station that broadcasts from the city of Ushuaia, capital of Tierra del Fuego Province and is operated by the provincial government.

== History ==
The license started its regular broadcasts on October 23, 1967, as LU 87 TV Canal 11 de Ushuaia.

At launch, it carried a four-hour schedule with pre-recorded programs that were sent in from Buenos Aires by plane.

Its first produced program was El noticiero in 1968, presented by Tito Aloras and Felipe Ivandic; later followed by Minuto 91 presented by Sr. de Amuchástegui.

On May 13, 1968, by means of Decree 2527, the National Executive Chamber granted a license for the territorial government to operate on channel 11 in Ushuaia, capital of the then-territory of Tierra del Fuego.

Noteworthy programs in the mid-70s included Will Jizz y Buenas Tardes Música, both aimed at the youth.

In 1972, the first telethon was made favoring the local firefighters, which was uninterrupted. In the evening, people who came to the channel to make their donations were interviewed.

In 1974, an agreement with RAI was signed, enabling it to air programs produced in Italy for one year.

In 1976, local programs Cristal and Los Batocletti obtained their first national awards. The former, presented by Irma Sardi, obtained the Saint Claire of Assisi Award, and the latter, the Martin Fierro Award, in the children's category.

By 1978, Notionce was presented by Walter Agüero and Jorge Alberto Molinolo; the station also started its color broadcasts to air matches of the 1978 FIFA World Cup.

On October 2, 1984, Comité Federal de Radiodifusión, by means of Resolution 782, authorized the government of the territorial province to install a relay station in Tolhuin, assigning it VHF channel 9; however, it was only used to relay Canal 13 from Río Grande. The relay was inaugurated in 1994. On February 8, that year, by means of Resolution 93, it also authorized the subsecretariate of the provincial government to install a relay station on Gable Island, on VHF channel 4.

On June 24, 2011, AFSCA, by means of Resolution 689, assigned Canal 11 digital UHF channel 29.

In 2012, it stopped broadcasting programming from El Trece due to the debts it had with the network. This enabled the station to aim more towards local programming.

In August 2016, the Patagonian public stations (including Canal 11) formed Red Patagónica de la Televisión Pública with the aim of allowing viewers to access a regional Patagonian news program with current political, economic, sports, cultural and tourist information.

In January 2018, Canal 11's signal was made available on the digital terrestrial system in Río Grande and Tolhuin on channel 27.1.

From June that same year, with its own uplink facilities, it started broadcasting its programming from the Arsat-1 satellite in high definition for the whole province and with national coverage.

The station suspended its operations for two weeks on April 6, 2020, due to pandemic infections among its staff.

On June 23, 2023, the station ceased its analog broadcasts due to the shutdown of analog signals in the Argentine south, according to ENACOM Decree nº. 156/2022.

== Programming ==
The station airs local programming: TVP Noticias (its news operation), En agenda (general interest), ADN extremo, (motorsport program), TVP Deportes (sports program), La cocina con Luis (cooking show).

== TVP Noticias ==
TVP Noticias is the name of its news operation. Currently it has two editions, on weekdays (at 12pm and 8pm).

Originally, it was called El noticiero in 1968 and during the 1970s, Notionce.

At an unknown date, it was renamed El noticiero until 2017, when it became TVP Noticias.

Since September 17, 2016, Canal 11 airs a weekly news compilation program called Resumen Patagónico de Noticias (Patagonian News Summary), where the news services of the stations that make up Red Patagónica de la Televisión Pública take part (including Canal 11).

== Relayer ==
Canal 11 used to have a relay station in Tolhuin, on channel 9, which shut down during the digital switchover.
