= Sandra Arana =

Peruvian presenter and actor

- Born: Sandra Elena Arana Arce; 31 October 1973 (age 52); Wisconsin, United States
- Occupations: Actress, model, TV presenter
- Modeling information
- Height: 166 cm (5 ft 5 in)
- Hair color: Brown
- Eye color: Brown

Sandra Elena Arana Arce (born 31 October 1973) is a Peruvian actress, model, and television presenter.

== Biography ==
Arana was born in Wisconsin, United States, to Peruvian parents. She studied at the Sacred Hearts Sophianum School. After graduating, she studied tourism and hospitality and became involved in acting.

She studied theater with Roberto Ángeles.

In 1999 she appeared in the telenovela Vidas prestadas, with Peruvian actor Bernie Paz and Venezuelan actress Grecia Colmenares.

In 2001 she became well known from the Efraín Aguilar series Mil oficios, where she played Giannina Olazo.

In 2004 she made her film debut with Días de Santiago. She also participated in the telenovelas Eva del Edén and Ángel Rebelde from the production company Fonovideo.

In 2006 she appeared in seven different chapters for the Telemundo series Decisiones. That same year she played a role in Amores como el nuestro. In 2007 she returned to Peru to star in the miniseries Baila reggaetón, and then as an antagonist on Sabrosas. The following year she participated in El Rostro de Analía on Telemundo.

In 2011 she performed in La Perricholi on América Televisión. In June 2011 she began working as a reporter for the reality show Combate, which she won with the green team.

== Filmography ==
=== Telenovelas ===
- Vidas prestadas (1999)
- Ángel Rebelde (2004) as Laura
- Eva del Edén (2004) as Josefa
- Amores como el nuestro (2006) as Sor Andrea
- El Rostro de Analía (2008–2009) as Rogelia
- La Perricholi (2011) as Inés de Mayorga

=== Other fiction TV series ===
- Mil oficios (2001) as Giannina Olazo
- Habla barrio (2003) as Karina Aspíllaga
- Camino a casa (2006)
- Decisiones (2006)
- Baila Reggaetón (2007) as Cachita
- Sabrosas (2007) as Sherry Beltrán

=== Nonfiction TV series ===
- Desafío 2006 (2006)
- La Guerra de los sexos (2006)
- Pecaditos de la noche (2007), host
- Combate (2011–2012), reporter
- Espectáculos (2014–2016, Frecuencia Latina)
- Hola a Todos (2016, ATV), main commentator
- Bailando por el show (2017), participant

== Theater ==
- Hormigas (2011)
- Travesuras Conyugales (2015)
- Papito piernas largas (2016)
- Por qué seremos así... (2017)
