= Channel 13 virtual TV stations in Canada =

The following television stations operate on virtual channel 13 in Canada:

- CBCT-DT in Charlottetown, Prince Edward Island
- CBKFT-DT in Regina, Saskatchewan
- CFCN-DT-5 in Lethbridge, Alberta
- CFEM-DT in Rouyn-Noranda, Quebec
- CHAU-DT-5 in Percé, Quebec
- CHBC-DT-1 in Penticton, British Columbia
- CHMI-DT in Winnipeg, Manitoba
- CIII-DT-13 in Timmins, Ontario
- CIMT-DT-2 in Trois-Pistoles, Quebec
- CIMT-DT-4 in Baie-Saint-Paul, Quebec
- CITV-DT in Edmonton, Alberta
- CJOH-DT in Ottawa, Ontario
- CKCO-DT in Kitchener, Ontario
- CKRT-DT-3 in Rivière-du-Loup, Quebec
- CKTM-DT in Trois-Rivières, Quebec
