= Channel 13 TV stations in Canada =

The following television stations broadcast on digital or analog television channel 13 in Canada:

- CBCT-DT in Charlottetown, Prince Edward Island
- CBKFT-DT in Regina, Saskatchewan
- CFCN-DT-5 in Lethbridge, Alberta
- CFEM-DT in Rouyn-Noranda, Quebec
- CFRS-DT in Saguenay, Quebec
- CHAU-DT-5 in Percé, Quebec
- CHMI-DT in Winnipeg, Manitoba
- CIII-DT-13 in Timmins, Ontario
- CIMT-DT-2 in Trois-Pistoles, Quebec
- CIMT-DT-4 in Baie-Saint-Paul, Quebec
- CITV-DT in Edmonton, Alberta
- CJOH-DT in Ottawa, Ontario
- CKCO-DT in Kitchener, Ontario
- CKPG-TV-5 in Quesnel, British Columbia

== Defunct ==
- CKRT-DT-3 in Rivière-du-Loup, Quebec
- CFRN-TV-1 in Grande Prairie, Alberta
- CFRN-TV-12 in Athabasca, Alberta
- CHBC-TV-9 in Apex Mountain, British Columbia
- CHSH-TV-2 in Chase, British Columbia
- CICT-TV-2 in Banff, Alberta
- CITM-TV-1 in Williams Lake, British Columbia
- CJBN-TV in Kenora, Ontario
- CJCH-TV-4 in Bridgetown, Nova Scotia
- CKCA-TV in Chateh, Alberta
- CKYB-TV-1 in McCreary, Manitoba
- CKYF-TV in Flin Flon, Manitoba
