= Channel 13 low-power TV stations in the United States =

The following low-power television stations broadcast on digital or analog channel 13 in the United States:

- K13AT-D in Dolores, Colorado
- K13AV-D in Gunnison, Colorado
- K13BA-D in Winthrop-Twisp, Washington
- K13BE-D in Harlowton, Montana
- K13BI-D in Entiat, Washington
- K13CP-D in Cedar City, Utah
- K13CQ-D in Rock Island, Washington
- K13DU-D in Whitewater, Montana
- K13ER-D in Cashmere, Washington
- K13FP-D in Wolf Point, Montana
- K13GP-D in Malta, Montana
- K13HA-D in Mink Creek, Idaho
- K13HM-D in Myrtle Creek, Oregon
- K13IB-D in Glasgow, Montana
- K13IG-D in Sidney - Fairview, Montana
- K13IY-D in Leavenworth, Washington
- K13JD-D in Battle Mountain, Nevada
- K13JO-D in Hinsdale, Montana
- K13KH-D in Townsend, Montana
- K13KP-D in Boulder, Montana
- K13KU-D in Delta Junction, Alaska
- K13KV-D in Troy, Montana
- K13LN-D in Ekalaka, Montana
- K13LU-D in Ursine, Nevada
- K13LV-D in Caliente, Nevada
- K13MA-D in Scobey, Montana
- K13MI-D in Squaw Valley, etc., Oregon
- K13ML-D in Hotchkiss, etc., Colorado
- K13NQ-D in Ruth, Nevada
- K13NR-D in Ely & McGill, Nevada
- K13NZ-D in Shoshoni, Wyoming
- K13OC-D in Douglas, etc., Alaska
- K13OG-D in Rural Juab, etc., Utah
- K13OQ-D in Big Sandy, Montana
- K13OU-D in Chinook, Montana
- K13OW-D in Baker, Montana
- K13PE-D in Shady Grove, Oregon
- K13PF-D in Pinehurst, Oregon
- K13PI-D in Ruch & Applegate, Oregon
- K13PJ-D in Vallecito, Colorado
- K13PO-D in Hysham, Montana
- K13PU-D in Pioche, Nevada
- K13PZ-D in Poplar, Montana
- K13QE-D in Driggs, Idaho
- K13QH-D in Swan Valley/Irwin, Idaho
- K13QK-D in Virgin, Utah
- K13QY-D in Dingle, etc., Idaho
- K13RD-D in Collbran, Colorado
- K13RK-D in Roswell, New Mexico
- K13RN-D in Old Harbor, Alaska
- K13RR-D in Tok, Alaska
- K13RV-D in Leadore, Idaho
- K13SA-D in Port Heiden, Alaska
- K13SE-D in Stony River, Alaska
- K13SM-D in Slana, Alaska
- K13SN-D in Nucla, Colorado
- K13SV-D in Pedro Bay, Alaska
- K13SY-D in Birch Creek, Alaska
- K13TD-D in White Mountain, Alaska
- K13TE-D in Bettles, Alaska
- K13TJ-D in Mountain Village, Alaska
- K13TN-D in Manley Hot Springs, Alaska
- K13TR-D in Homer, Alaska
- K13UF-D in Rexburg, Idaho
- K13UL-D in Hillsboro, New Mexico
- K13UO-D in Cold Bay, Alaska
- K13UV-D in Napakiak, Alaska
- K13WT-D in Plevna, Montana
- K13XG-D in Ismay Canyon, Colorado
- K13XH-D in Weber Canyon, Colorado
- K13XW-D in Akron, Colorado
- K13XX-D in Hesperus, Colorado
- K13ZI-D in Colorado Springs, Colorado
- K13ZL-D in Fresno, California
- K13ZN-D in Heron, Montana
- K13ZQ-D in Lubbock, Texas
- K13ZS-D in Sargents, Colorado
- K13AAD-D in Long Valley Junction, Utah
- K13AAE-D in Healy, Alaska
- K13AAF-D in Monticello/Blanding, Utah
- K13AAH-D in Salina & Redmond, Utah
- K13AAI-D in Marysvale, Utah
- K13AAJ-D in Woodland & Kamas, Utah
- K13AAL-D in Beaver etc., Utah
- K13AAM-D in Garrison, etc., Utah
- K13AAN-D in Roosevelt, Utah
- K13AAO-D in Helper, Utah
- K13AAP-D in East Price, Utah
- K13AAQ-D in Prineville, etc., Oregon
- K13AAX-D in Redding, California
- KDPH-LD in Phoenix, Arizona
- KHFD-LD in Dallas, Texas
- KHTM-LD in Lufkin, Texas
- KJDA-LD in Sherman, Texas
- KKEY-LP in Bakersfield, California
- KOLD-TV in Tucson, Arizona
- KQVE-LD in San Antonio, Texas
- KUTA-LD in Ogden, Utah
- KXDF-CD in Fairbanks, Alaska
- KXHG-LD in Sunnyside, Washington
- KXXW-LD in Tyler, Texas
- KYLX-LD in Laredo, Texas
- W13DI-D in Yauco, etc., Puerto Rico
- W13DP-D in Youngstown, Ohio
- W13DQ-D in Atlanta, Georgia
- W13DS-D in Cleveland, Ohio
- W13DT-D in Montgomery, Alabama
- W13DV-D in Crozet, Virginia
- WBFL-CA in Valdosta, Georgia
- WDSS-LD in Syracuse, New York, uses WNYI's full-power spectrum
- WIVX-LD in Cleveland, Ohio
- WKOB-LD in New York, New York
- WMEL-LD in Grenada, Mississippi
- WODN-LD in Portage, Indiana
- WXVO-LD in Pascagoula, Mississippi

The following low-power stations, which are no longer licensed, formerly broadcast on digital or analog channel 13:

- K13AH in Inkom, Idaho
- K13AP in Kamiah, Idaho
- K13BB in Carlin, Nevada
- K13BZ in Helper, Utah
- K13CV in Beaver, etc., Utah
- K13DB in Green River, Utah
- K13DE in Wolcott, Colorado
- K13EH in Ainsworth, Nebraska
- K13EN in Orovada, Nevada
- K13EX in Bridgeport, etc., California
- K13EZ-D in Squilchuck St. Park, Washington
- K13GL in Happy Camp, etc., California
- K13HF in Vernal, etc., Utah
- K13HG in Ketchum, etc., Idaho
- K13HK-D in Sand Springs, Montana
- K13HU-D in Fort Jones, etc., California
- K13ID in Hopland, California
- K13IU in Eagleville, California
- K13KY in Portage Creek, Alaska
- K13LO in Yreka, etc., California
- K13MN in Washington, Iowa
- K13MZ in Usibelli, etc., Alaska
- K13NF in Ridgecrest, etc., California
- K13NT in Hatch, Utah
- K13OX in Mud Canyon, New Mexico
- K13OY in Mescalero, New Mexico
- K13PL in Glendive, Montana
- K13QQ in Skagway, Alaska
- K13QZ in Grand Valley, Colorado
- K13RM in Dot Lake, Alaska
- K13SB in Chitina, Alaska
- K13SC in Port Graham, Alaska
- K13SD in Cape Pole, Alaska
- K13SG in Kasaan, Alaska
- K13SH in Adak, Alaska
- K13SI in Circle, Alaska
- K13SK in Quinhagak, Alaska
- K13SZ in Coffman Cove, Alaska
- K13TA in Wiseman, Alaska
- K13TC in Tuntutuliak, Alaska
- K13TK in Minto, Alaska
- K13TO in New Stuyahok, Alaska
- K13TQ in Koyukuk, Alaska
- K13TS in Naukati Bay, Alaska
- K13TT in Hobart Bay, Alaska
- K13TU in Port Alsworth, Alaska
- K13TV in Port Protection, Alaska
- K13UB in Glennallen & Copper, Alaska
- K13UE in Kotzebue, Alaska
- K13UG in Nome, Alaska
- K13UJ in Platinum, Alaska
- K13UK-D in Kwigillingok, Alaska
- K13UM in Mosquito Lake, Alaska
- K13UX in Diomede, Alaska
- K13VC in Austin, Texas
- K13VT in Samak, Utah
- K13VV in Chenega, Alaska
- K13XL in Henrieville, Utah
- K13XS in Bluff & area, Utah
- K13XU in Tulsa, Oklahoma
- K13YC in Montezuma Creek/Aneth, Utah
- K13YL in Fish Lake Resort, Utah
- K13YU in Tonopah, Nevada
- KCHY-LP in Cheyenne, Wyoming
- KDAX-LP in Amarillo, Texas
- KJEF-CA in Jennings, etc., Louisiana
- KSAD-LP in San Angelo, Texas
- KWDT-LP in Corpus Christi, Texas
- W13BB in Bergton-Criders, Virginia
- W13DU-D in Hardeeville, South Carolina
- WBXU-CA in Raleigh, North Carolina
- WBXV-CA in Louisville, Kentucky
- WIVC-LP in Charlottesville, Virginia
- WNNY-LP in Syracuse, New York
- WSCP-LP in Bellefonte, Pennsylvania
- WUMN-LP in Minneapolis, Minnesota
