= XHDE-TDT =

Television station in San Luis Potosí, San Luis Potosí, Mexico

San Luis Potosí, San Luis Potosí; Mexico
- Channels: Digital: 16 (UHF); Virtual: 13
- Branding: Canal 13; CN13 (newscasts)

Programming
- Affiliations: Independent

Ownership
- Owner: Televisora Potosina, S.A. de C.V.

History
- First air date: November 11, 1975
- Last air date: November 12, 2020
- Former channel number: Analog: 13 (VHF)
- Former affiliations: Televisa

Technical information
- ERP: 50.6 kW
- Transmitter coordinates: 22°09′04″N 100°57′09″W

Links
- Website: cn13.tv

XHDE-TDT (channel 13) was a television station in San Luis Potosí, San Luis Potosí, Mexico, which operated from 1975 to 2020. For most of its history an affiliate of Televisa, the station operated for the last two years as an independent station. XHDE left the air in November 2020, when unionized station employees voted to go on strike due to lack of payment. Its abandoned studios burned in a 2024 fire.

== History ==
XHDE began broadcasting on November 1, 1975, making it the first truly local television station in San Luis Potosí. (A repeater of the XEW network had previously been in operation.)

XHDE maintained a partnership with Televisa and carried programming from FOROtv, resulting in the station being defined as within the "preponderant economic agent" in broadcasting for regulatory purposes; 80 percent of its programming in 2014 was sourced from the company. Televisa programming was removed from XHDE in 2018 after the company multiplexed FOROtv on its own transmitter in San Luis Potosí.

On November 12, 2020, a strike began as unionized employees blocked access to the station. Employees had not been paid since January. The station had been in poor financial condition since the disaffiliation from Televisa. The station never returned to the air; its studios were ransacked for parts and scrap metal, and in October 2024 a fire destroyed the building.

== Programming ==
XHDE aired local CN13 newscasts, as well as other locally produced programming.
