= XHBG-TDT =

Television station in Uruapan–Morelia, Michoacán

Morelia/Uruapan, Michoacán; Mexico
- Channels: Digital: 27 (UHF); Virtual: 13
- Branding: Canal 13

Programming
- Affiliations: Canal 13

Ownership
- Owner: Telsusa Televisión México, S.A. de C.V.

History
- First air date: November 18, 1984
- Former channel numbers: 13 (analog, 1984-2015)

Technical information
- Licensing authority: CRT
- ERP: 300 kW
- Transmitter coordinates: 19°26′20″N 101°30′41″W

XHBG-TDT is a television station on channel 27 in Uruapan and Morelia, Michoacán, Mexico. transmitting from Cerro Burro. It forms part of the Telsusa Canal 13 network owned by Albavisión.

== History ==
XHBG came to air on analog channel 13 on November 18, 1984, with full transmissions beginning January 15, 1985. The station's original studios were located in Uruapan, though the station later relocated to Morelia.

The station moved to digital in 2013. In December 2015, simultaneous with the analog shutoff in Michoacán, it ditched channel 13 branding to brand as its digital physical channel, 27, later returning to 13.

XHBG was for decades an affiliate of Nu9ve and Foro TV and its predecessors. In November 2019, however, Televisa was approved to have Nu9ve and Foro TV multiplexed on two of its Canal 5 transmitters, XHMOW-TDT in Uruapan and Morelia and XHZAM-TDT in Zamora, beginning January 1, 2020. The loss of Nu9ve programming and declining advertising revenues resulted in the station closing its local news operation and laying off 100 of its 110 staff. The station then reemerged by March airing programming from Telsusa/Canal 13; the concession transfer to Telsusa Televisión México, S.A. de C.V., was approved by the Federal Telecommunications Institute on September 2, 2020.

== Repeater ==
XHBG has one repeater, at Zamora, Michoacán, with an effective radiated power of 30 kW.
