= XHGK-TDT =

Television station in Tapachula, Chiapas, Mexico

- Tapachula, Chiapas; Mexico
- Channels: Digital: 26 (UHF); Virtual: 13
- Branding: Canal 13

Programming
- Subchannels: 13.1: Canal 13; 13.3: TN23
- Affiliations: Telsusa

Ownership
- Owner: Albavisión; (Comunicación del Sureste, S.A. de C.V.)

History
- Founded: 1984
- Former call signs: XHGK-TV (1984-2016)
- Former channel numbers: 4 (analog and digital virtual, 1984-2018)

Technical information
- Licensing authority: CRT
- ERP: 80 kW
- HAAT: -179.8 m
- Transmitter coordinates: 14°53′15″N 92°17′03″W
- Repeaters: Mapastepec (RF 28); Huixtla (RF 28)

Links
- Website: comsureste.com

XHGK-TDT is a television station in Tapachula, Chiapas. XHGK broadcasts on virtual channel 13 (physical channel 26) and is part of the Canal 13 regional network.

== History ==
XHGK's concession was awarded on June 19, 1984, to José de Jesús Partida Villanueva, a businessman with connections to Televisa; it originally specified channel 10 in Comitán de Domínguez, but XHGK would be quickly relocated to Tapachula on analog channel 4. In 1993, the station's concession was transferred to Comunicación del Sureste.

XHGK maintained a partnership with Televisa and carried programming from its Gala TV and Foro TV, and as a Televisa partner, Comunicación del Sureste was defined as within the "preponderant economic agent" in broadcasting for regulatory purposes. In 2014, XHGK sourced 82 percent of its broadcast day from Televisa. In 2017, simultaneous events prompted XHGK to disaffiliate from Televisa. One was the unwinding of many local relationships as Televisa began to multiplex Gala TV and Foro TV on subchannels of its own TV stations in some areas of the country where said programming had been broadcast on a local station, including Tapachula. Another was the successful participation of Telsusa Televisión México, S.A. de C.V., a company also controlled by Remigio Ángel González, in the IFT-6 television station auction, in which it acquired TV stations in twelve cities primarily in southern and eastern Mexico.

On October 18, 2018, XHGK and its sister stations moved to virtual channel 13.

== Programming ==
XHGK's local program output includes local newscasts, branded as 13 Noticias del Soconusco (previously Noti-4), and a morning magazine and talk show, Giros (previously Chismoleando).

Outside of local programming, XHGK, its Chiapas sister station XHDY, and its Tabasco sister station XHTVL/XHTOE air almost all of the same programming. Since disaffiliating from Televisa, most of XHGK's entertainment programming has come from Albavisión television channels in other countries, such as El show del problema and the Argentine version of Combate from elnueve and Un amor indomable, which was commissioned for ATV and La Red, or been acquired on the international market, such as the Colombian telenovela Lo que diga el corazón. Weekends are taken up by older Mexican movies.

== Transmitters ==
In addition to the primary transmitter, XHGK-TDT is rebroadcast in two areas on additional repeaters.

RF	Location	ERP
28	Mapastepec	2 kW
28	Huixtla	5 kW
