= Canal 13 (Mexico) =

Mexican regional television network

- Type: Free-to-air television network
- Country: Mexico
- Transmitters: see below

Programming
- Language: Spanish
- Picture format: 1080i HDTV

Ownership
- Owner: Albavisión (Tele-emisoras del Sureste SA de CV)

History
- Launched: April 23, 1980; 45 years ago
- Former names: Canal 9 (1980-2018)

Links
- Website: www.canal13mexico.com

Availability

Terrestrial
- Digital terrestrial television (Mexico): Channel 13

Canal 13 is a regional broadcasting network operating in parts of Mexico, a division of Albavisión. Its largest subsidiary, Telsusa Televisión México, S.A. de C.V., holds the concessions for 12 TV stations, primarily in southeastern Mexico, obtained in the IFT-6 television station auction of 2017. The Canal 13 network also includes full-fledged TV stations in Villahermosa, San Cristóbal de las Casas—Tuxtla Gutiérrez and Tapachula, as well as their repeaters, and an additional station in Michoacán. All Canal 13 stations are assigned virtual channel 13.

== History ==
=== In Tabasco and Chiapas ===
The core of the Canal 13 network was born in 1980 with the concession award of XHTVL-TV, analog channel 9 in Villahermosa, to Tele-Emisoras del Sureste, S.A. de C.V. (from which the name Telsusa is derived). Tele-Emisoras was owned by Remigio Ángel González, a Guatemalan entrepreneur who would later accumulate media holdings elsewhere in Latin America, as well as radio station owner Francisco Javier Sánchez Campuzano and Manuel Efraín Abán Méndez, who had placed the winning application for the channel in 1979, beating out Jorge Kanahuati Gómez and Fernando Laurencio Pazos de la Torre. XHTVL later expanded its area of influence to Tenosique with the launch of satellite station XHTOE-TV (analog channel 12) and into southern Veracruz, where Tele-Emisoras del Sureste principals took over noncommercial station XHCVP-TV in Coatzacoalcos. XHCVP, while a social station, operates as a repeater of XHTVL, and in 2016, it was legally represented by lawyers associated with Albavisión.

On June 19, 1984, José de Jesús Partida Villanueva, one of Chiapas's pioneer broadcasters, received concessions for two further stations. XHDY-TV Channel 5 would cover central Chiapas, including San Cristóbal de las Casas and the state capital of Tuxtla Gutiérrez, while XHGK-TV Channel 4 was ultimately moved from an initial assignment in Comitán de Domínguez to be placed in Tapachula and cover the Soconusco region. In 1987, Sánchez Campuzano exited the partnership, as well as his stake in Comunicación del Sureste, which owned XHDY and XHGK.

Despite González being born in Mexico, Telsusa was a small link in Albavisión, which grew to wield considerable national broadcasting—and political—power elsewhere in Latin America. González's close relationship with Televisa secured affiliations with the company for his stations, which broadcast programming from Gala TV and Foro TV along with local news and productions; Tele-Emisoras del Sureste and Comunicación del Sureste were considered part of the "preponderant economic agent" in broadcasting. In March 2020, the IFT approved an application for Tele-Emisoras del Sureste to be removed from this designation, as it aired no Televisa programming.

=== Toward a regional network ===
González set his sights on expanding his Mexican holdings as early as 2008, when Proceso reported that he was eyeing the creation of a national television network if new TV stations were put out for bid. While he did not participate in the IFT-1 national network auction of 2015 that produced Imagen Televisión, his Telsusa Televisión Mexico, S.A. de C.V., was the largest winner of stations in the IFT-6 station auction of 2017, emerging with 12 stations. The new stations expanded Telsusa's footprint to the entire Yucatán Peninsula, with seven total stations in Campeche, Yucatán and Quintana Roo, as well as two in Veracruz and one each in Puebla, Guanajuato (León), and Nuevo León (Agualeguas); the company paid 261.5 million pesos for the stations.

Activity remained mostly quiet on the new stations through 2018, with the exception of an agreement with the Sistema Público de Radiodifusión del Estado Mexicano to use SPR transmitter sites in Campeche, Xalapa and Mérida. Significant changes, however, were in store at the legacy Telsusa outlets, which dropped all Televisa programming, slightly expanded their local news production, and relocated from virtual channel 9 to 13 (as Nu9ve and Foro TV prevented the use of it in most other areas; Nu9ve and Foro TV now has virtual channel 9 in the entire former Telsusa footprint).

The first new Telsusa station to begin broadcasting was XHTMQR-TDT in Cancún, which began testing in June 2019. In September 2019, five more stations hit the air in the span of a week, covering Valladolid, Yucatán, Puebla, Campeche, Mérida and Ciudad del Carmen. The two transmitters in the state of Veracruz and XHTMGJ-TDT in León were commissioned in April 2020. Three more IFT-6 stations remain to be put on air.

In March 2020, Canal 13 programming began to air on XHBG-TDT in the state of Michoacán. That station, a former Televisa-aligned local outlet, had shuttered its own local operation in early January. Local program production there was started at the same time. Six months later, the IFT approved the transfer of the station's concession to Telsusa.

During 2022, Telsusa acquired XEDK-TDT in Jalisco and XHBO-TDT in Oaxaca, being transferred some time later.

== Telsusa stations ==
Including the twelve IFT-4 stations, Telsusa holds 16 commercial television station concessions, primarily in southeastern Mexico, and controls a 17th social station. An 18th station is currently affiliated with the network.

RF	VC	Call sign	Location	ERP	Concessionaire
27	13	XHTMCA-TDT	Campeche, Camp.	49.035 kW	Telsusa Televisión México
25	13	XHTMCC-TDT	Ciudad del Carmen, Camp.	150 kW	Telsusa Televisión México
36	13	XHDY-TDT	San Cristóbal de las Casas, Chis.	160 kW	Comunicación del Sureste
28	13	XHGK-TDT	Tapachula, Chis.	80 kW	Comunicación del Sureste
36	13	XHTMGJ-TDT	León, Gto.	142.86 kW	Telsusa Televisión México
35	13	XEDK-TDT	Guadalajara, Jal.	140 kW	Telsusa Televisión México
27	13	XHBG-TDT	Morelia/Uruapan, Mich.	300 kW	Telsusa Televisión México
20	13	XHTMNL-TDT	Agualeguas, NL	70.1 kW	Telsusa Televisión México
32	13	XHBO-TDT	Oaxaca, Oax.	102.929 kW	Telsusa Televisión México
32	13	XHTMPT-TDT	Puebla, Pue.	109.825 kW	Telsusa Televisión México
32	13	XHTMQR-TDT	Cancún, QR	80.610 kW	Telsusa Televisión México
20	13	XHTMCH-TDT	Chetumal, QR	80 kW	Telsusa Televisión México
19	13	XHTMTU-TDT	Tulum, QR	80 kW	Telsusa Televisión México
26	13	XHTOE-TDT (Note: Full-time satellite of XHTVL-TDT)	Tenosique, Tab.	55 kW	Tele-Emisoras del Sureste
30	13	XHTVL-TDT	Villahermosa, Tab.	160 kW	Tele-Emisoras del Sureste
20	13	XHCVP-TDT (Note: Social station; full-time satellite of XHTVL-TDT)	Coatzacoalcos, Ver.	1 kW	Patronato para Instalar Repetidoras de Canales de Televisión en Coatzacoalcos, Veracruz
29	13	XHTMBR-TDT	Veracruz, Ver.	10 kW	Telsusa Televisión México
19	13	XHTMVE-TDT	Xalapa, Ver. La Perla (Orizaba), Ver. Nogales, Ver.	68.6 kW; 6 kW; 3 kW	Telsusa Televisión México
24	13	XHTMYC-TDT	Mérida, Yuc.	160.6 kW	Telsusa Televisión México
27	13	XHTMYU-TDT	Valladolid, Yuc.	80.126 kW	Telsusa Televisión México
