= XHDY-TDT =

Television station in San Cristóbal de las Casas–Tuxtla Gutiérrez, Chiapas

- San Cristóbal de las Casas-Tuxtla Gutiérrez, Chiapas; Mexico
- Channels: Digital: 36 (UHF); Virtual: 13
- Branding: Canal 13

Programming
- Subchannels: 13.1: Canal 13; 13.3: TN23
- Affiliations: Telsusa; El Nueve

Ownership
- Owner: Albavisión; (Comunicación del Sureste, S.A. de C.V.)

History
- Founded: 1984
- Former call signs: XHDY-TV (1984-2016)
- Former channel numbers: 5 (analog and digital virtual, 1984-2016); 9 (virtual, 2016-2018)
- Former affiliations: Gala TV; FOROtv

Technical information
- Licensing authority: CRT
- ERP: 160 kW
- HAAT: 1,241.9 m
- Transmitter coordinates: 16°43′59″N 92°45′40″W

Links
- Website: comsureste.com

XHDY-TDT is a television station broadcasting from its transmitter in San Cristóbal de las Casas, Chiapas and studios in the state capital of Tuxtla Gutiérrez. XHDY broadcasts on virtual channel 13 (physical channel 36) and is part of the Telsusa regional network. The station carries El Nueve programs.

== History ==
XHDY's concession was awarded on June 19, 1984, to José de Jesús Partida Villanueva, a businessman with connections to Televisa. In 1993, the station's concession was transferred to Comunicación del Sureste.

XHDY maintained a partnership with Televisa and carried programming from its Channel 9 Network and FOROtv, and as a Televisa partner, Comunicación del Sureste is defined as within the "preponderant economic agent" in broadcasting for regulatory purposes. In 2014, XHDY sourced 72 percent of its broadcast day from Televisa. In 2017, simultaneous events prompted XHDY to disaffiliate from Televisa. One was the unwinding of many local relationships as Televisa began to multiplex Gala TV and FOROtv on subchannels of its own TV stations in some areas of the country where said programming had been broadcast on a local station, including Tuxtla Gutiérrez and San Cristóbal de las Casas. Another was the successful participation of Telsusa Televisión México, S.A. de C.V., a company also controlled by Remigio Ángel González, in the IFT-6 television station auction, in which it acquired TV stations in twelve cities primarily in southern and eastern Mexico.

On October 18, 2018, XHDY and its sister stations moved to virtual channel 13.

== Programming ==
XHDY's local program output includes local newscasts, branded as 13 Noticias Chiapas (previously Noticinco), and a morning magazine and talk show, Giros (previously Día Tras Día).

Outside of local programming, XHDY, its Chiapas sister station XHGK, and its Tabasco sister station XHTVL/XHTOE air almost all of the same programming. Since disaffiliating from Televisa, most of XHDY's entertainment programming has come from Albavisión television channels in other countries, such as El show del problema and the Argentina version of Combate (produced by elnueve in Argentina) or been acquired on the international market, such as the Colombian telenovela Lo que diga el corazón. Weekends are taken up by older Mexican movies.

== Repeaters ==
The primary transmitter for XHDY-TDT is located atop Cerro Pig in San Cristóbal de las Casas. XHDY has a second transmitter atop Cerro Huitepec, another mountain in the same municipality, as Cerro Huitepec blocks reception of the Cerro Pig transmitter in some portions of San Cristóbal. Two additional repeaters provide significant coverage extensions:

City	RF channel	ERP	HAAT	Transmitter coordinates
Cerro Huitepec, San Cristóbal de las Casas	36	5 kW	1243.7 m	16°44′16.4″N 92°41′17.2″W
Bochil	36	1.2 kW		16°59′34.58″N 92°53′34.07″W
Comitán de Domínguez	36	3.66 kW	485.9 m	16°15′56.9″N 92°09′37.3″W
Las Margaritas	36	2 kW		16°18′43.44″N 91°59′55.89″W
Ocosingo	36	4 kW		16°53′50.91″N 92°06′02.41″W
Tonalá	36	3 kW		16°05′42.02″N 93°45′09.71″W
Tuxtla Gutiérrez	36	0.6 kW	-317.7 m	17°30′30.1″N 91°58′35.7″W
