= Canal 13 (Costa Rican TV channel) =

Costa Rican television channel

Trece Costa Rica Televisión
- Country: Costa Rica

Programming
- Picture format: 1080i HDTV

Ownership
- Owner: Sistema Nacional de Radio y Television S.A.

History
- Launched: September 15, 1978; 46 years ago

Links
- Website: www.sinart.go.cr

Availability

Terrestrial
- Digital VHF: Channel 13.1

Trece Costa Rica Televisión is a Costa Rican public television channel, owned and operated by Sistema Nacional de Radio y Television S.A. (SINART).

== History ==
In 1969 a seminar on public television was held at the University of Costa Rica. During the administration of Daniel Oduber Quirós, the idea of such a station began to mature, by commencing contacts with Spain to provide technical assistance. In April 1976, Banco Exterior de España gave SINART 356 million pesetas to finance technical assistance and the buying of equipment.

On September 16, 1977, the transmitting tower at the Irazú volcano was inaugurated; later on April 25, 1978, the facilities of Televisión Educativa y Cultural (TVEC) were inaugurated with a cost surpassing three million colones, ahead of the change of governance (the new president, Rodrigo Carazo Odio, took over May 8). On the same day, Radio Nacional's building was also inaugurated. It was expected that TVEC would operate for five to six hours a week.

Following the change of presidency in the country, Rodrigo Carazo Odio decided to merge TVEC, Radio Nacional and the planned government weekly Contrapunto into a single company, SINART, under the grounds that the radio and TV stations would work better as a unified outlet.

Chester Zelaya relaunched SINART in 1986 following the election of Arías Sánchez. Under his management, the Cosmovisión newscast is restarted, causing a huge investment in its personnel. Zelaya renounced in June 1988, being replaced by Nelson Brenes López-

On October 30, 2017, as part of a reface of all of SINART's media outlets, the channel was renamed Trece Costa Rica Televisión. In 2022, SINART's new administration renamed it Canal 13.
