= Channel 13 (Río Grande, Argentina) =

LU 88 TV Canal 13
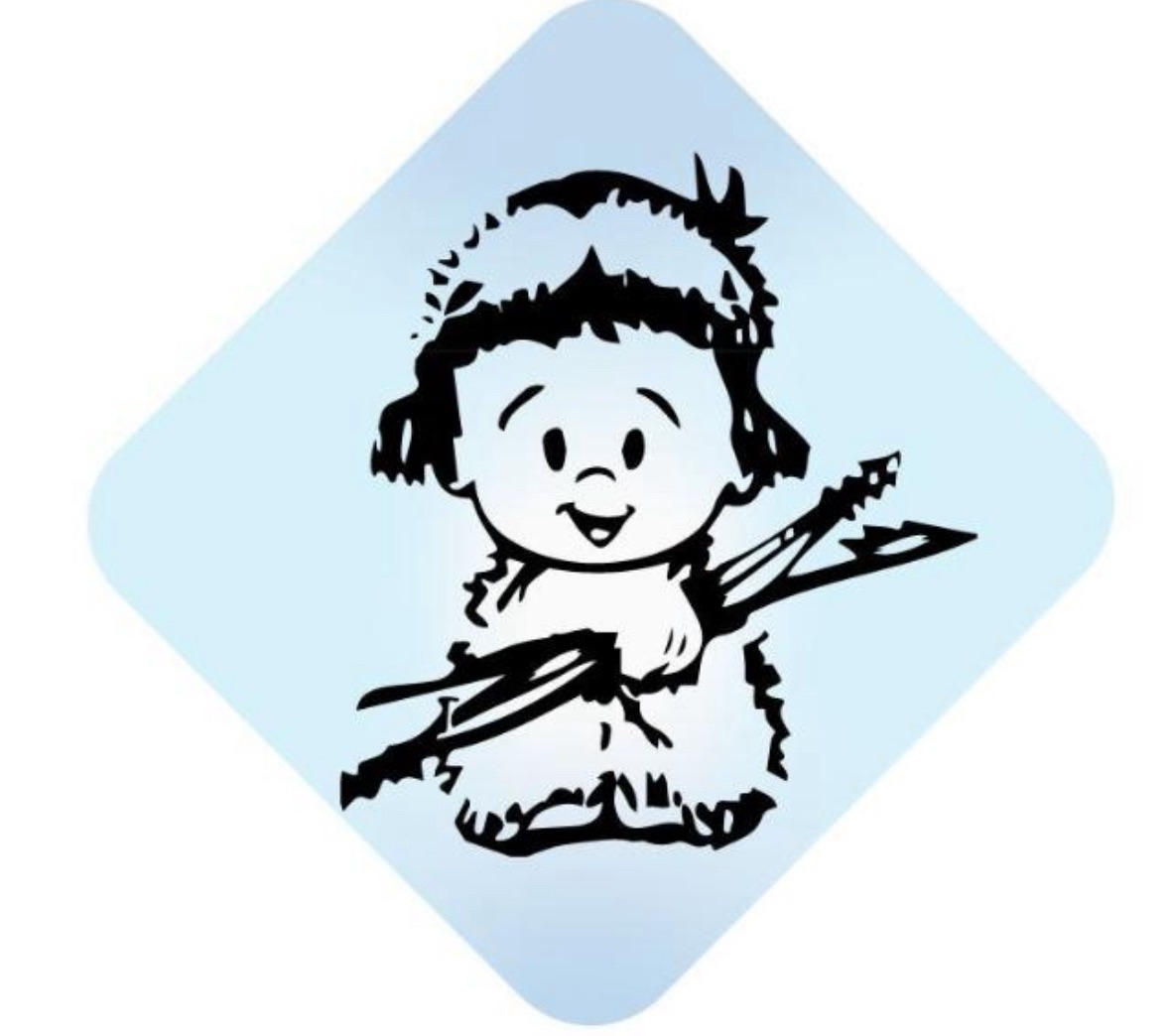
- Río Grande, Tierra del Fuego; Argentina
- Channels: Analog: 13 (VHF); Digital: 29 (UHF)
- Branding: Canal 13 Río Grande

Programming
- Affiliations: Televisión Pública

Ownership
- Owner: Government of Tierra del Fuego Province

History
- First air date: October 24, 1967

Technical information
- Licensing authority: ENACOM

Links
- Website: tvpublica.tdf.ar

Canal 13 Río Grande, also known as El Canal del Onita (The Onita (Note: Diminutive of Ona, name given by the Yahgan people to the Selkʼnams) Channel), is an Argentine over-the-air television station licensed to Río Grande, Tierra del Fuego, operated by the provincial government.

== History ==
The license started regular broadcasts on October 24, 1967 as LU 88 TV Canal 13 de Río Grande.

At the time of founding, Río Grande had a population of 4,000 inhabitants. Most of its programming was offered from Canal 13 from Buenos Aires. Its mascot was an "Onita" as a character representing the province, specifically the Selkʼnam people.

The country was governed by coupist Juan Carlos Onganía. The government of the then National Territory of Tierra del Fuego, Antarctica and the South Atlantic Islands, was Rear Admiral José María Guzmán; while Canal 13's first director-general, Godofredo Videla and its first technical boss, Rodolfo Rivarola, who ended up dying on May 15, 1984 due to an air accident in the Antarctic sector.

In 1968, the station started producing its newscast, Teletrece Noticias, running for 60 minutes on Sundays. It consisted of highlights of the week's national and international news, which were sent by Canal 9 de Buenos Aires.

On May 13, 1968, by means of Decree 2527, the National Executive Chamber granted a license for the territorial government to operate on channel 13 in Río Grande.

In 1971, Canal 13 bagged its first national award by winning the Cruz de Plata Esquiú Award.

On October 2, 1984, Comité Federal de Radiodifusión, by means of Resolution 782, authorized the government of the territorial province to install a relay station in Tolhuin, assigning it VHF channel 9.

In 1991, Canal 13 started airing Telefe's programming.

Among the other awards obtained at both local and national levens, the one that stood out was Premio Broadcasting, granted to children's program Chechelandia; while its newscast Actualidad fueguina was nominated for the Martín Fierro Awards in 1995.

In 2004, it started to gradually change its former equipment for digital equipment, before achieving its mid-term goal for total replacement.

Canal 13 had an OB van with a local link and one with satellite link.

In 2005, it held a live broadcast from Porvenir, in Chile, for the 32nd edition of Gran Premio de la Hermandad, as its first outside broadcast from outside Argentina.

From the late 2000s, Canal 13 was facing a slow process of updating expanding its facilities, after eight years of abandonment, in 2011, its staff denounced its "emptying".

On June 24, 2011, AFSCA, by means of Resolution 689, assigned Canal 11 digital UHF channel 29.

In December 2013, the station lost the rights to relay Telefe programming due to the fact that the station had a debt with the network which surpassed one million Argentine pesos.

In October 2014, then-senator for Tierra del Fuego Rosana Bertone issued a declaration project (N.º de Expediente 3266/14) declaring Canal 13's program Tierra de Fueguitos of public interest.

In August 2016, the Patagonian public stations (including Canal 13) formed Red Patagónica de la Televisión Pública with the aim of allowing viewers to access a regional Patagonian news program with current political, economic, sports, cultural and tourist information.

Shortly after the station started digital broadcasts using TDF Canal 11's signal, on August 22, 2018, its programming was delivered in high definition on the Arsat-1 satellite with national reach.

On July 22, 2020, during the pandemic, one of its staff was infected by the virus and suspended its operations for one week.

Camerographer José Mansilla died on March 8, 2023. A mural with his face was inaugurated on its facilities on December 20, 2024.
