= Francisco Javier Sánchez Campuzano =

Mexican politician and businessman

- Born: 8 August 1941 (age 84); Mexico City
- Education: UNAM
- Occupations: Politician, broadcaster, writer
- Political party: PRI

Francisco Javier Sánchez Campuzano (born August 8, 1941) is a Mexican businessman and radio station owner. He started with selling commercial space at a radio station. After his father died he invested his inheritance in a concession to sell playboy in Mexico.

He founded Grupo Siete, which owns 11 radio stations, primarily in the State of Mexico, the internet provider Twister Telecom and a national cable television concession.

From 2000 to 2003, Sánchez Campuzano served as a federal deputy from the fourth proportional representation region, representing the Federal District, to the LVIII Legislature of the Mexican Congress.

== Life ==
Sánchez was born on August 8, 1941, in Mexico City. He briefly studied in England and France and then obtained his undergraduate degree in Diplomatic Sciences from the UNAM, where he also obtained his master's and graduate degrees and spent 20 years as an associate professor of political propaganda, communications and public relations in the UNAM School of Political and Social Sciences. In the early 1970s, Sánchez taught communications classes at the Universidad Anáhuac. In the early 1970s, Sánchez worked at Núcleo Radio Mil and Radio Fórmula.

Sánchez joined the PRI in 1975. 1977 was an important year for Sánchez Campuzano; he became an advisor to the Secretary of Programming and Budget, began teaching about political advertising in the PRI's internal Institute of Political Training, and founded Grupo Siete, starting with the purchase of one daytimer AM radio station in the state of Coahuila. After a brief stint as an advisor to the Secretariat of Agrarian Reform, Sánchez became an advisor to Grupo Financiero Bancrecer in 1982. From 1980 to 1994, Sánchez headed Hoy magazine.

From 1991 to 1993, Sánchez presided over the ARVM (Valley of Mexico Broadcasters' Association). In 1998, Sánchez served as the President of the National Chamber of the Radio and Television Industry, the national association of broadcasters.

In 2000, the PRI sent Sánchez Campuzano to San Lázaro. He served for one term in the Chamber of Deputies and sat on the Foreign Relations, Communications, and Radio, Television and Film Commissions.

== Books ==
After his legislative career, Sánchez Campuzano began writing; he has published several works about religion, history, philosophy and politics. Titles include Institución Papal (Papal Institution), Historia Cronolineal de México (Chronological History of Mexico) and Karma Dharma.
