= Combate =

Peruvian reality TV show

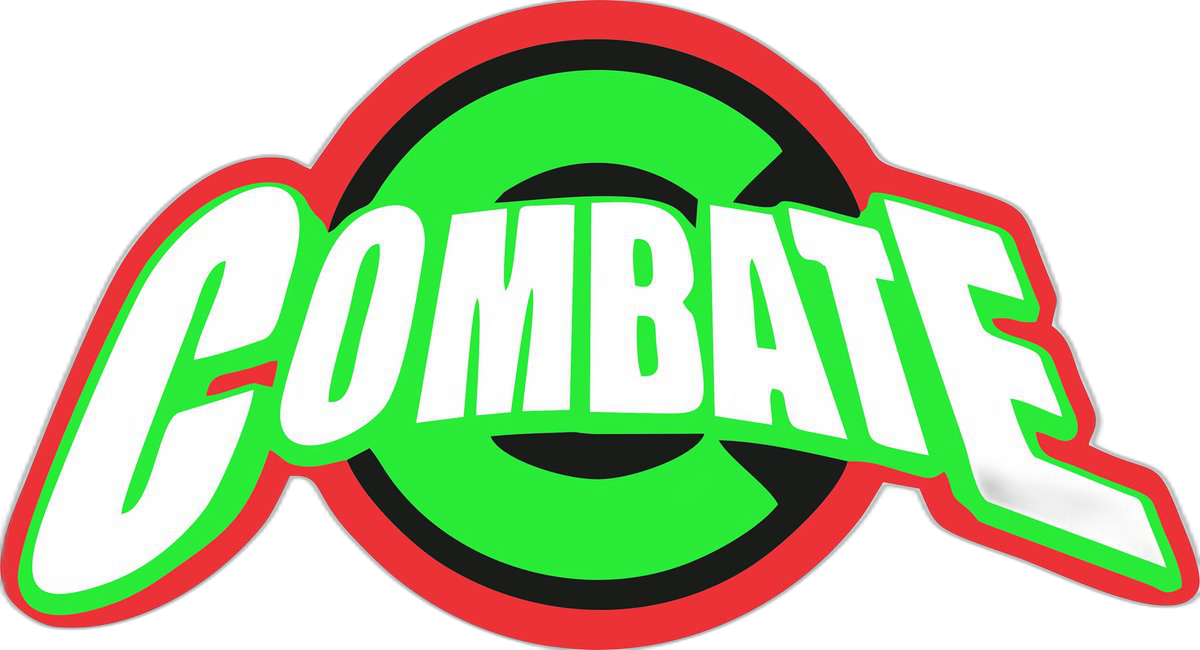
- Combate Peru.png
- Genre: Reality Television
- Presented by: Renzo Schuller (Challenge Host); Gian Piero Diaz
- Country of origin: Peru
- Original language: Spanish
- No. of series: 14

Production
- Running time: 30 minutes

Original release
- Network: Andina de Televisión
- Release: 27 June 2011

Combate is a Peruvian reality show, first adaptation from Combate Ecuador, led by Renzo Schuller and Gian Piero Diaz, which premiered on June 27, 2011, by Andina de Televisión. In its initial stage, it consisted of two teams, "Green" and "Red": they faced to be the champion of the season. In its fifth season, it was formed by four teams called nations, representing the four elements: "Water", "Earth", "Fire" and "Air". The program used an "Iron Throne", a similar object used in the television series Game of Thrones, as the main objective for which they fight, and used the theme of the animated series Avatar: The Last Airbender, by using the four elements and their symbols for each team. However, midseason had the "merger tournament" where 4 nations merged into two teams and returned to the "Green" and "Red" was conducted.

== Seasons ==
- The first season aired from June 27 to October 27, 2011. This season reached a low average sintonía audience. The winner was the "Green Team", consisting of: Miguel Rebosio, Macs Cayo, Jeddah Eslava and Stefano Tosso. He told Sandra Arana as a reporter.
- The second season began on October 28, 2011, and ended on August 3, 2012. The winner was the "Red Team", consisting of : Julián Zucchi, Jeddah Eslava, Mario Irivarren, Alejandro Benitez "Zumba", Sheyla Rojas and Michael Finseth.
- The third season began on August 6, 2012, and ended on August 8, 2013. The winner was the "Green Team", consisting of: Mario Hart, Alejandra Baigorria, Israel Dreyfus, Diana Sánchez, David Zegarra and Jeddah Eslava; Alejandra Baigorria of the green team and the red team's Mario Irivarren won the title of best fighters remaining; finalists Diana Sanchez and Israel Dreyfus both of the green team.
- The fourth season aired again from January 13 to May 16, 2014, with the name "Combat: Xtreme summer". The winner was the "Red Team", consisting of: Karen Dejo, Mario Irivarren, Paloma Fiuza, Ernest Jiménez, Ximena Holes y Andrés Gaviño, this last in understudy of Erick Sabater.

=== Season 4 ===
Valentina Shevchenko was a contestant on the fourth season where she placed first in the competition together with her dance partner, South American reality television star Alejandro “Zumba” Benitez.

== Controversies ==
The similarities of this program format has its competition in the schedule, ¡Esto es guerra! (This Is War!), which began in May 2012; they have led many fans for Combat labeled as "copy" of the program of America Producer Marisol Televisión. Crousillat It is said that war copied to Combat 18 turn Gian Piero Diaz and Renzo Schuller openly expressed their displeasure at cámaras. However, Mariana Ramirez del Villar, producer of This Means War, dismissed the allegations, saying they are "slaps strangled" because they earned in audiencia.Esta situation has not changed since 2014; This is because war is the leader in your schedule and leave far behind Combat, you get far fewer entries than the American program TV20.

The Chilean presenter Calle 7, Jean Philippe Cretton program, during one of the issues on its agenda expressed anger over the similarities between the formats of Peru, Costa Rica and Ecuador, saying Calle 7 itself is an original format, accusing "copycat others" programs.

In March 2013, a social request lodged in the Change.org website and addressed to Indecopi, requested the signing of 545 thousand citizens to the realities Combate and ¡Esto es guerra! (This is War!) and respect the protection zone menor 22. Both realities have received considerable criticism through social networks, cataloging of "trash TV"

The lack of knowledge of the participants to answer questions of general culture has been criticized on social networks, and also by journalist Beto Ortiz. La Paloma Fiuza participant told reporters: "The production asks us wrong by rating The accuracy of romances displayed on this reality show has been questioned several times by the press local. Another fact which led many criticisms from users of social networks was the live birth the son of the participant Sheyla Rojas.

This program has attracted acid and ironic criticism of Internet personalities as vlogger Andy'n'Sane.
