= San Diego =

- City
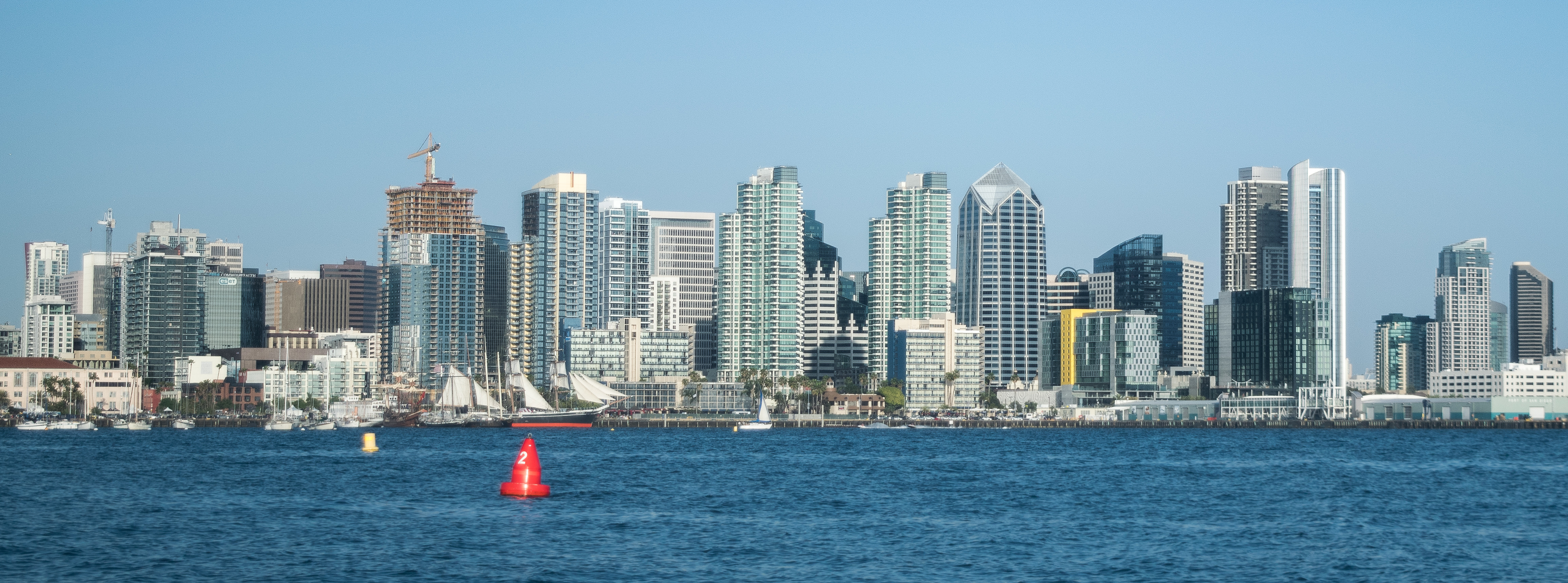
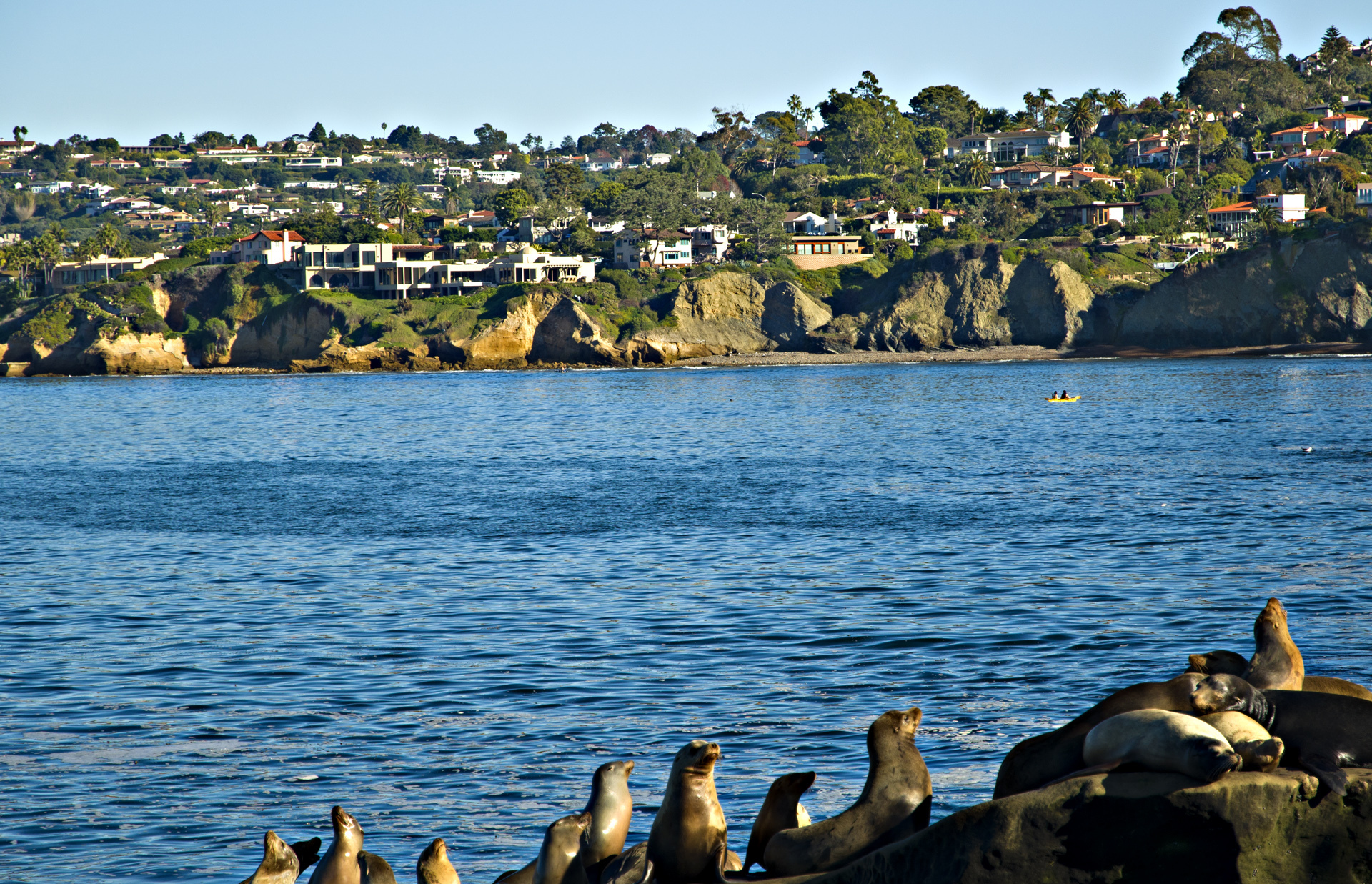
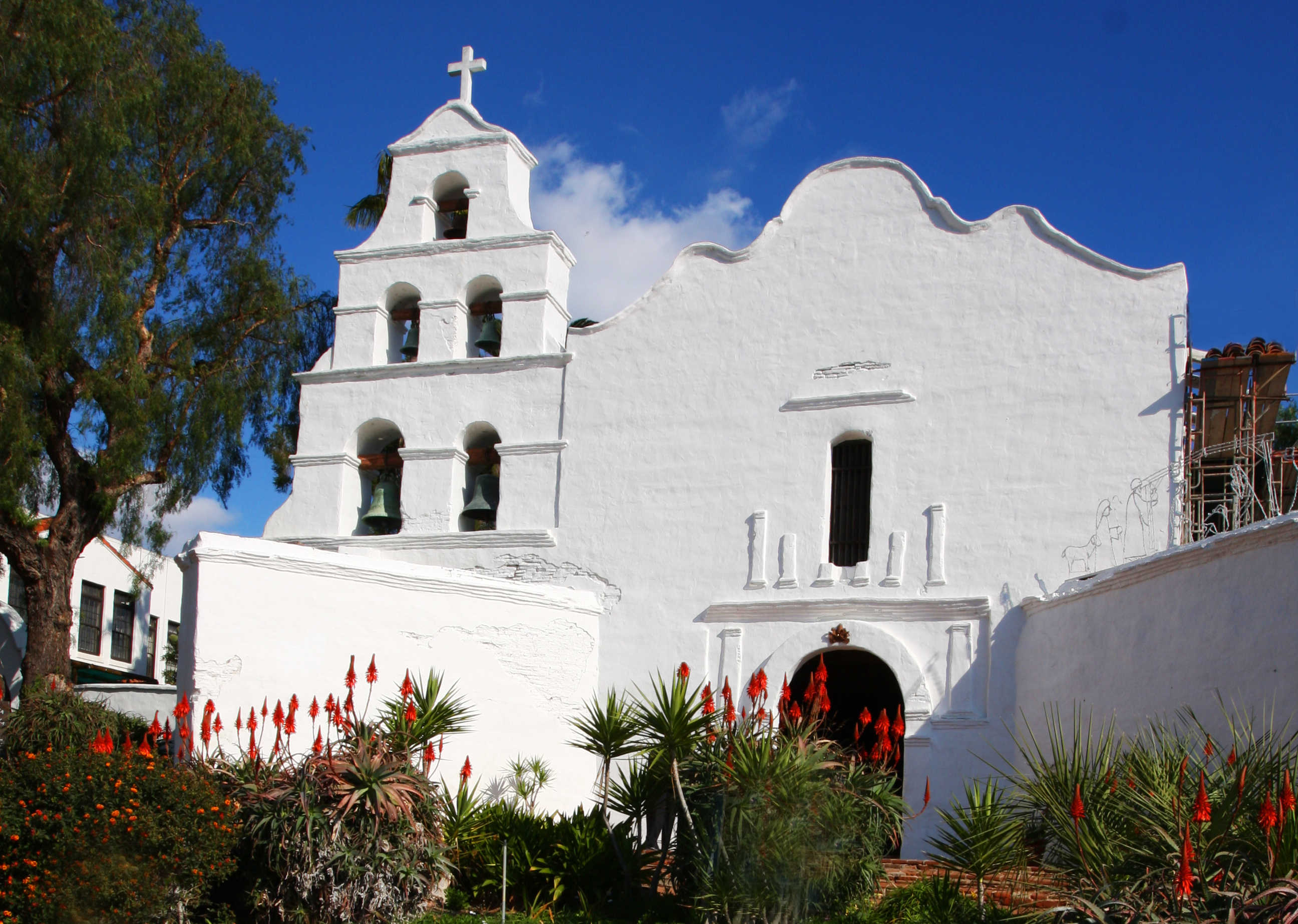
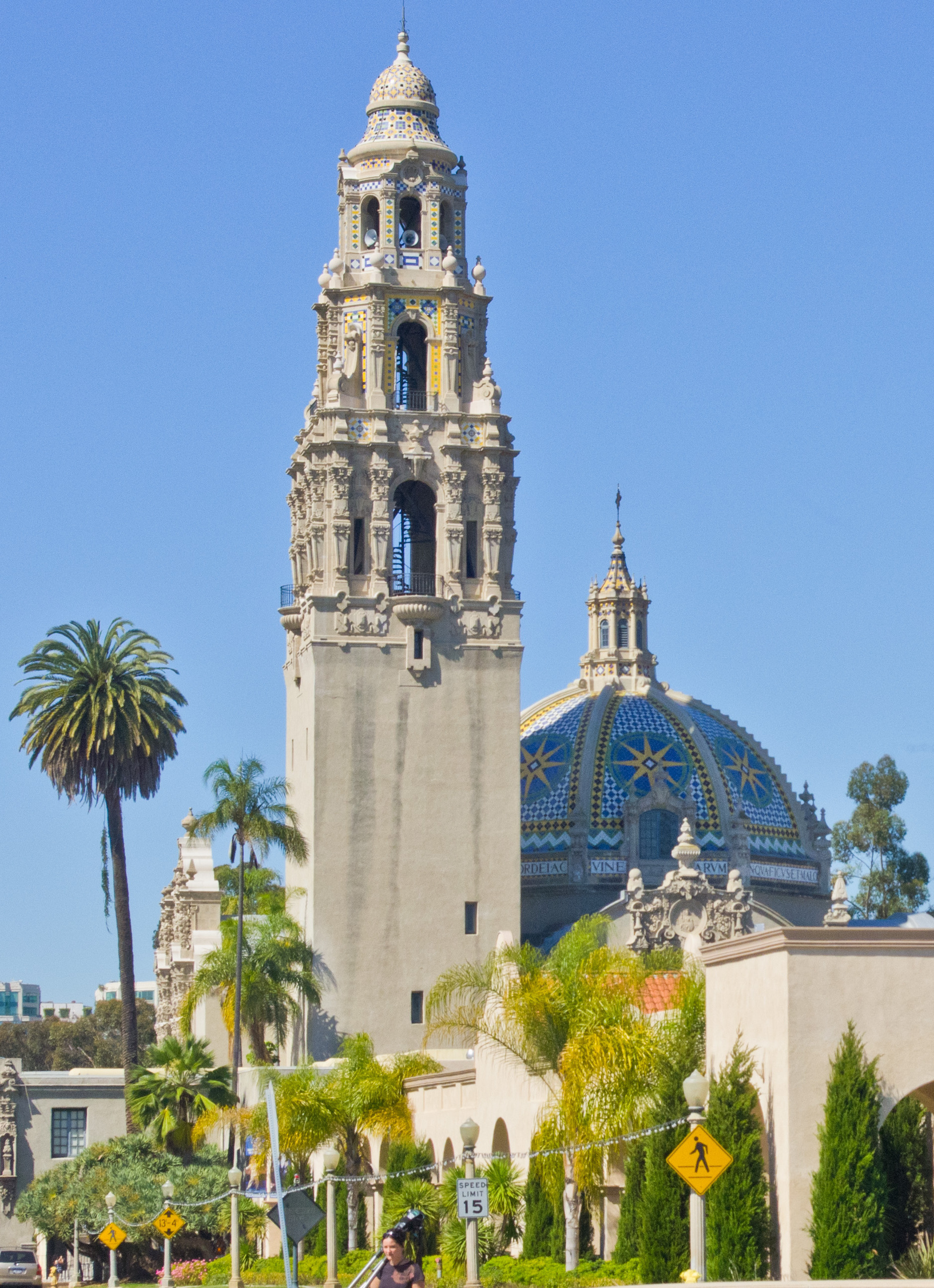
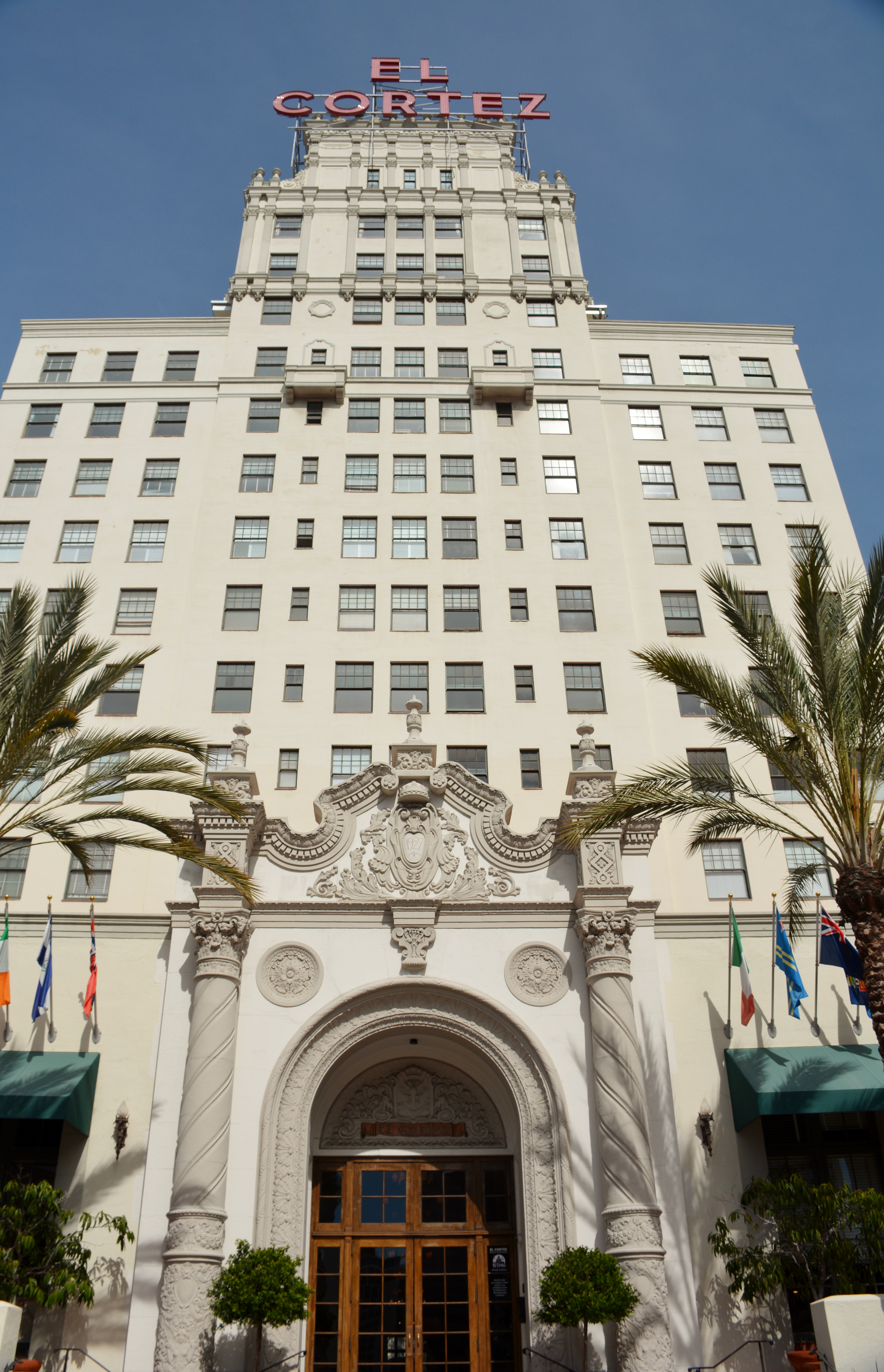
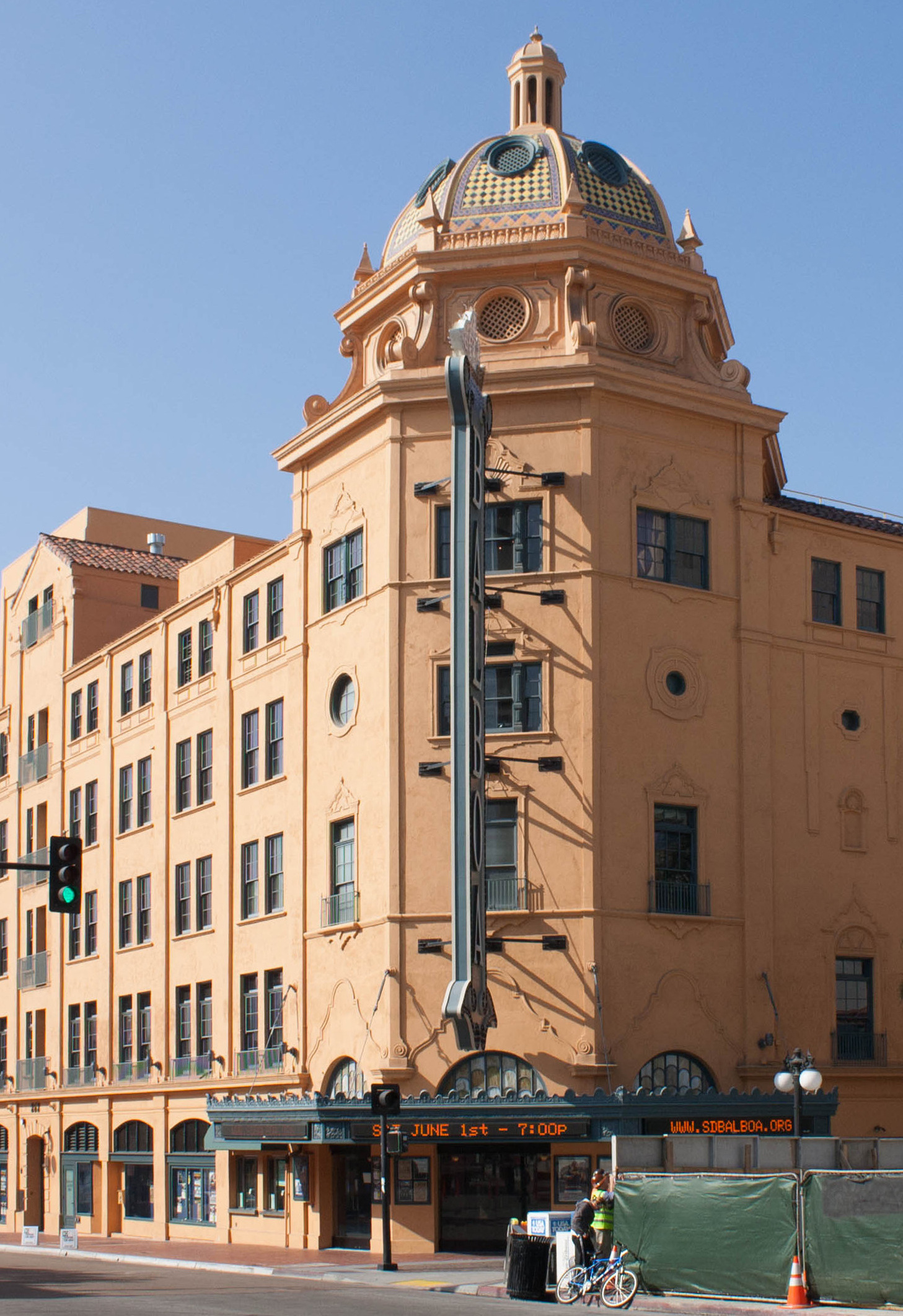
- Downtown San Diego skyline La Jolla Mission San Diego de Alcalá California Tower at Balboa Park El Cortez Balboa Theatre

- Flag Seal Logo
- Nicknames: "America's Finest City", "Birthplace of California", "City in Motion"
- Motto: Semper Vigilans (Latin for 'Always Vigilant')
- Interactive map of San Diego
- Location within California Location within the United States San Diego (North America)
- Coordinates: 32°42′54″N 117°09′45″W
- Country: United States
- State: California
- County: San Diego
- Established: July 16, 1769; 257 years ago
- Incorporated: March 27, 1850
- Named for: Saint Didacus of Alcalá

Government
  - Type: Mayor-council
  - Body: San Diego City Council
  - Mayor: Todd Gloria (D)
  - City Attorney: Heather Ferbert (D)
  - City Council: List: • Joe LaCava D-District 1; • Jennifer Campbell D-District 2; • Stephen Whitburn D-District 3; • Henry L. Foster III D-District 4; • Marni von Wilpert D-District 5; • Kent Lee D-District 6; • Raul Campillo D-District 7; • Vivian Moreno D-District 8; • Sean Elo-Rivera D-District 9
  - State Assembly Members: List: • Carl DeMaio R-75th District; • Darshana Patel D-76th District; • Tasha Boerner D-77th District; • Chris Ward D-78th District; • LaShae Sharp-Collins D-79th District; • David Alvarez D-80th District
  - State Senators: List: • Steve Padilla D-18th District; • Catherine Blakespear D-38th District; • Akilah Weber D-39th District; • Brian Jones R-40th District

Area
  - Total: 372.42 sq mi (964.57 km^{2})
  - Land: 325.89 sq mi (844.04 km^{2})
  - Water: 46.54 sq mi (120.53 km^{2}) 12.50%
- Highest elevation (Cowles Mountain): 1,591 ft (485 m)
- Lowest elevation (Pacific Ocean): 0 ft (0 m)

Population (2020)
  - Total: 1,386,932
  - Estimate (2025): 1,406,106 ▲
  - Rank: 20th in North America; 8th in the United States; 2nd in California
  - Density: 4,256.0/sq mi (1,643.25/km^{2})
  - Urban: 3,070,300 (US: 15th)
  - Urban density: 4,550/sq mi (1,756.9/km^{2})
  - Metro: 3,298,799 (US: 18th)
- Demonym: San Diegan

GDP
  - Metro: $314.943 billion (2023)
  - Per capita: $95,472 (2023)
- Time zone: UTC−8 (PST)
  - Summer (DST): UTC−7 (PDT)
- ZIP Codes: 92101–92124, 92126–92132, 92134–92140, 92142–92143, 92145, 92147, 92149–92150, 92152–92155, 92158–92161, 92163, 92165–92179, 92182, 92186–92187, 92191–92193, 92195–92199
- Area codes: 619/858
- FIPS code: 06-66000
- GNIS feature IDs: 1661377, 2411782
- Website: sandiego.gov

San Diego (/ˌsæn diˈeɪɡoʊ/ SAN dee-AY-goh; Spanish: [san ˈdjeɣo]) is a city on the Pacific coast of Southern California, next to the Mexican border. It is the eighth-most populous city in the U.S. and second-most populous city in California with a population of over 1.4 million, while the San Diego area with over 3.3 million residents is the 18th-largest metropolitan area in the country. San Diego is the county seat of San Diego County. It is known for its mild Mediterranean climate, extensive beaches and parks, long association with the United States Navy, and recent emergence as a wireless, electronics, healthcare, and biotechnology development center.

Historically home to the Kumeyaay people, San Diego has been referred to as the Birthplace of California, as it was the first site visited and settled by Europeans on what is now the West Coast of the United States. In 1542, Juan Rodríguez Cabrillo claimed the area for Spain, forming the basis for the settlement of Alta California, 200 years later. The Presidio and Mission San Diego de Alcalá, founded in 1769, formed the first European settlement in what is now California. In 1821, San Diego became part of the newly declared Mexican Empire. California was ceded to the U.S. in 1848 following the Mexican–American War and was admitted as the 31st state in 1850.

The largest sectors of the economy of San Diego include military and defense-related activities, tourism, international trade, research, and manufacturing. The city is home to several universities, including UC San Diego, San Diego State University, and the University of San Diego. San Diego is the economic center of the San Diego–Tijuana region, the second-most populous transborder metropolitan area in the Western Hemisphere, home to an estimated five million people as of 2022. The primary border crossing between San Diego and Tijuana, the San Ysidro Port of Entry, is the busiest international land border crossing in the world outside of Asia (fourth-busiest overall). San Diego International Airport (SAN) is the busiest single-runway airport in the United States.

== Name ==
San Diego's name can be traced back to the 17th century when Spanish explorer Sebastián Vizcaíno bestowed it upon the area in 1602. He named the bay and the surrounding area "San Diego de Alcalá" in honor of Saint Didacus of Alcalá.

Prior to the Spanish establishment of San Diego, the Kumeyaay town was called Kosa'aay, meaning "drying out place" in the Kumeyaay language. After the establishment of San Diego, the Kumeyaay called town and city Tepacul Watai, meaning "Stacked Big". Luiseño speakers in the North County region called it Pushuyi.

== History ==
=== Pre-colonial period ===
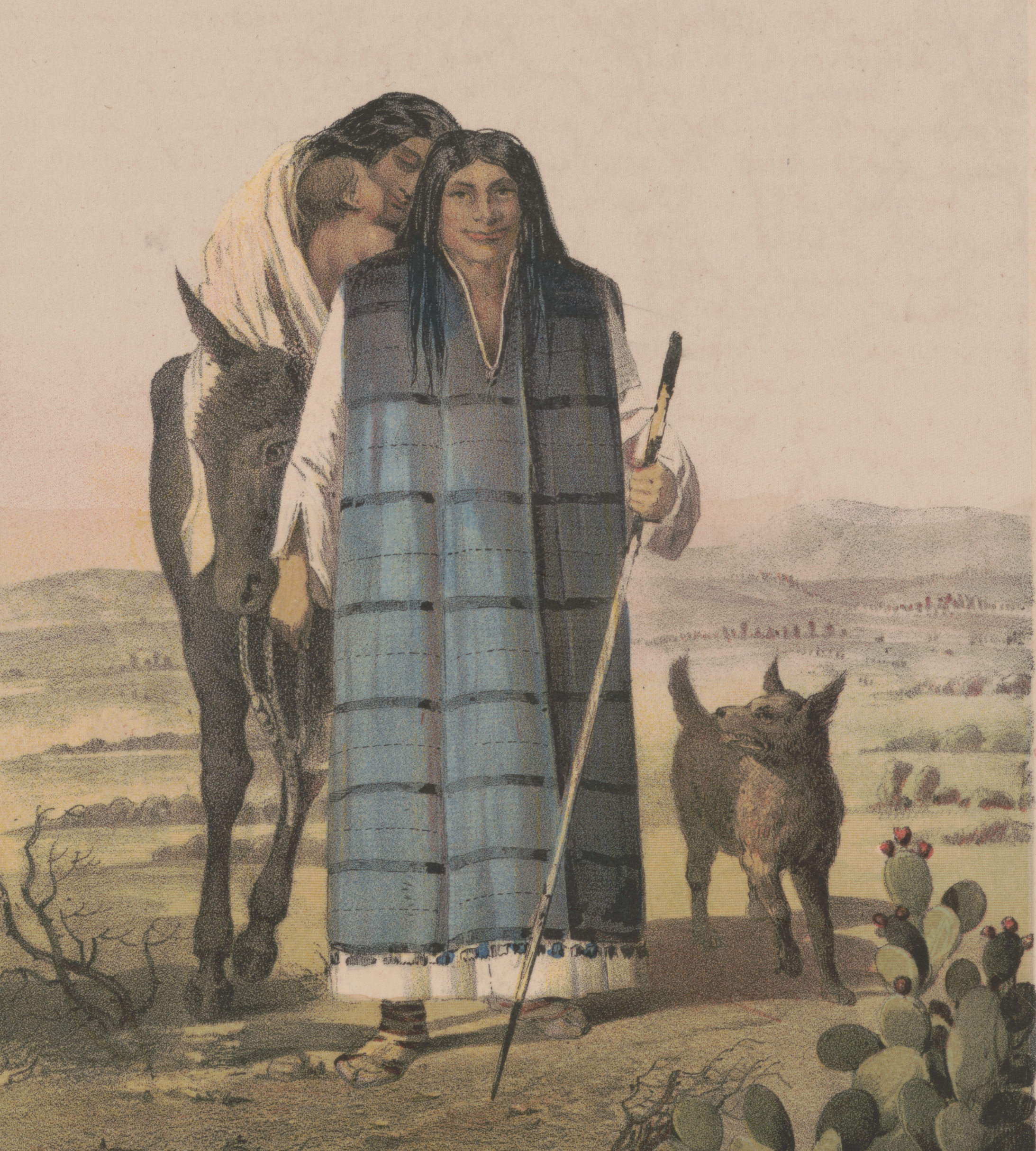
The Kumeyaay, referred to by the Spanish as Diegueños, have inhabited the area for thousands of years.

What has been referred to as the San Dieguito complex was established in the area at least 9,000 years ago. The Kumeyaay may have culturally evolved from this complex or migrated into the area around 1000 C.E. Archaeologist Malcolm Rogers hypothesized that the early cultures of San Diego were separate from the Kumeyaay, but this claim is disputed. Rogers later reevaluated his claims, yet they were influential in shaping historical tellings of early San Diego history.

The Kumeyaay established villages scattered across the region, including the village of Kosa'aay which was the Kumeyaay village that the future settlement of San Diego would stem from in today's Old Town. The village of Kosa'aay was made up of thirty to forty families living in pyramid-shaped housing structures and was supported by a freshwater spring from the hillsides.

=== Spanish period ===
Portuguese explorer Juan Rodríguez Cabrillo landing in San Diego Bay in 1542, claiming California for the Spanish Empire

The first European to visit the region was explorer Juan Rodríguez Cabrillo. Sailing his flagship San Salvador from Navidad, New Spain, Cabrillo claimed the bay for the Spanish Empire in 1542, and named the site "San Miguel". In November 1602, Sebastián Vizcaíno surveyed the harbor and what are now Mission Bay and Point Loma and named the area for the Catholic Saint Didacus, a Spaniard more commonly known as San Diego de Alcalá.

The permanent European colonization of both California and San Diego began in 1769 with the arrival of four contingents of Spaniards from New Spain and the Baja California peninsula. Two seaborne parties reached San Diego Bay: the San Carlos, under Vicente Vila and including as notable members the engineer and cartographer Miguel Costansó and the soldier and future governor Pedro Fages, and the San Antonio, under Juan Pérez. An initial overland expedition to San Diego from the south was led by the soldier Fernando Rivera and included the Franciscan missionary, explorer, and chronicler Juan Crespí, followed by a second party led by the designated governor Gaspar de Portolá and including the mission president Junípero Serra.

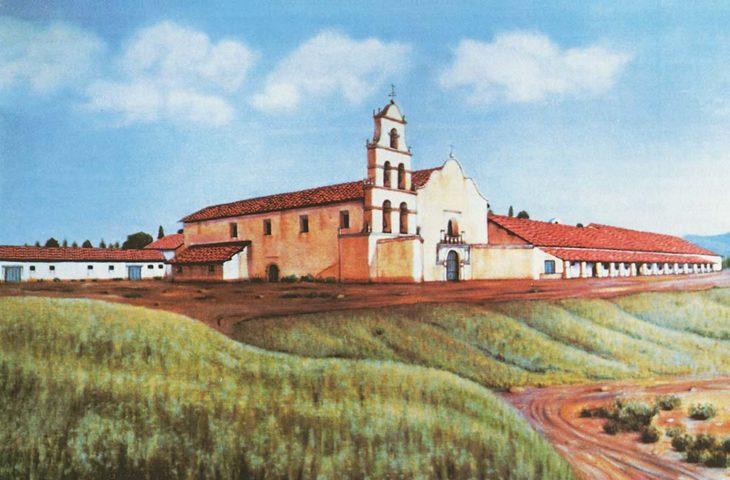
Mission San Diego de Alcalá was founded in 1769 by Saint Junípero Serra, making it the oldest of the Spanish missions in California.

In May 1769, Portolà established the Presidio of San Diego on a hill near the San Diego River above the Kumeyaay village of Cosoy, which would later become incorporated into the Spanish settlement, making it the first settlement by Europeans in what is now the state of California. In July of the same year, Mission San Diego de Alcalá was founded by Franciscan friars under Serra. The mission became a site for a Kumeyaay revolt in 1775, which forced the mission to relocate six miles (10 km) up the San Diego River. By 1797, the mission boasted the largest native population in Alta California, with over 1,400 neophytes living in and around the mission proper. Mission San Diego was the southern anchor in Alta California of the historic mission trail El Camino Real. Both the Presidio and the Mission are National Historic Landmarks.

=== Mexican period ===
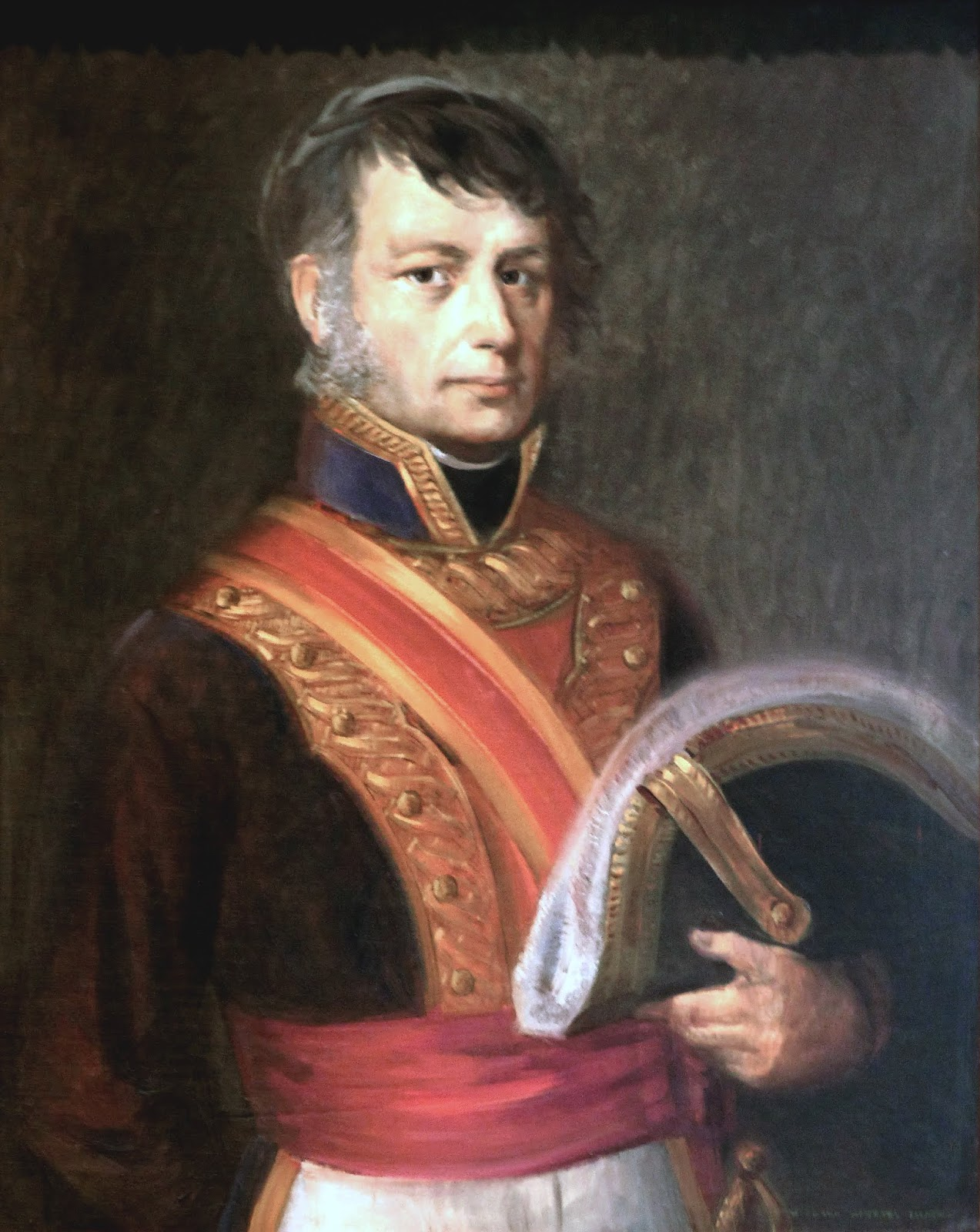
José María Estudillo served as commandant of the Presidio of San Diego and founded the Estudillo family, a powerful clan of Californios.

In 1821, Mexico won its independence from Spain, and San Diego became part of the Mexican territory of Alta California. In 1822, Mexico began its attempt to extend its authority over the coastal territory of Alta California. The fort on Presidio Hill was gradually abandoned, while the town of San Diego grew up on the level land below Presidio Hill. The Mission was secularized by the Mexican government in 1834, and most of the Mission lands were granted to former soldiers. The 432 residents of the town petitioned the governor to form a pueblo, and Juan María Osuna was elected the first alcalde ("municipal magistrate"). Beyond the town, Mexican land grants expanded the number of California ranchos that modestly added to the local economy.

However, San Diego had been losing population throughout the 1830s due to increasing tension between the settlers and the indigenous Kumeyaay. In 1838 the town lost its pueblo status because its size dropped to an estimated 100 to 150 residents. The ranchos in the San Diego region faced Kumeyaay raids in the late 1830s and the town itself faced raids in the 1840s.

Americans gained an increased awareness of California and its commercial possibilities from the writings of two countrymen involved in the hide and tallow trade, which was often officially forbidden to foreigners but economically significant, with San Diego serving as a major port and the only one with an adequate harbor: William Shaler's "Journal of a Voyage Between China and the North-Western Coast of America, Made in 1804" and Richard Henry Dana's more substantial and convincing account, of his 1834–36 voyage, Two Years Before the Mast.

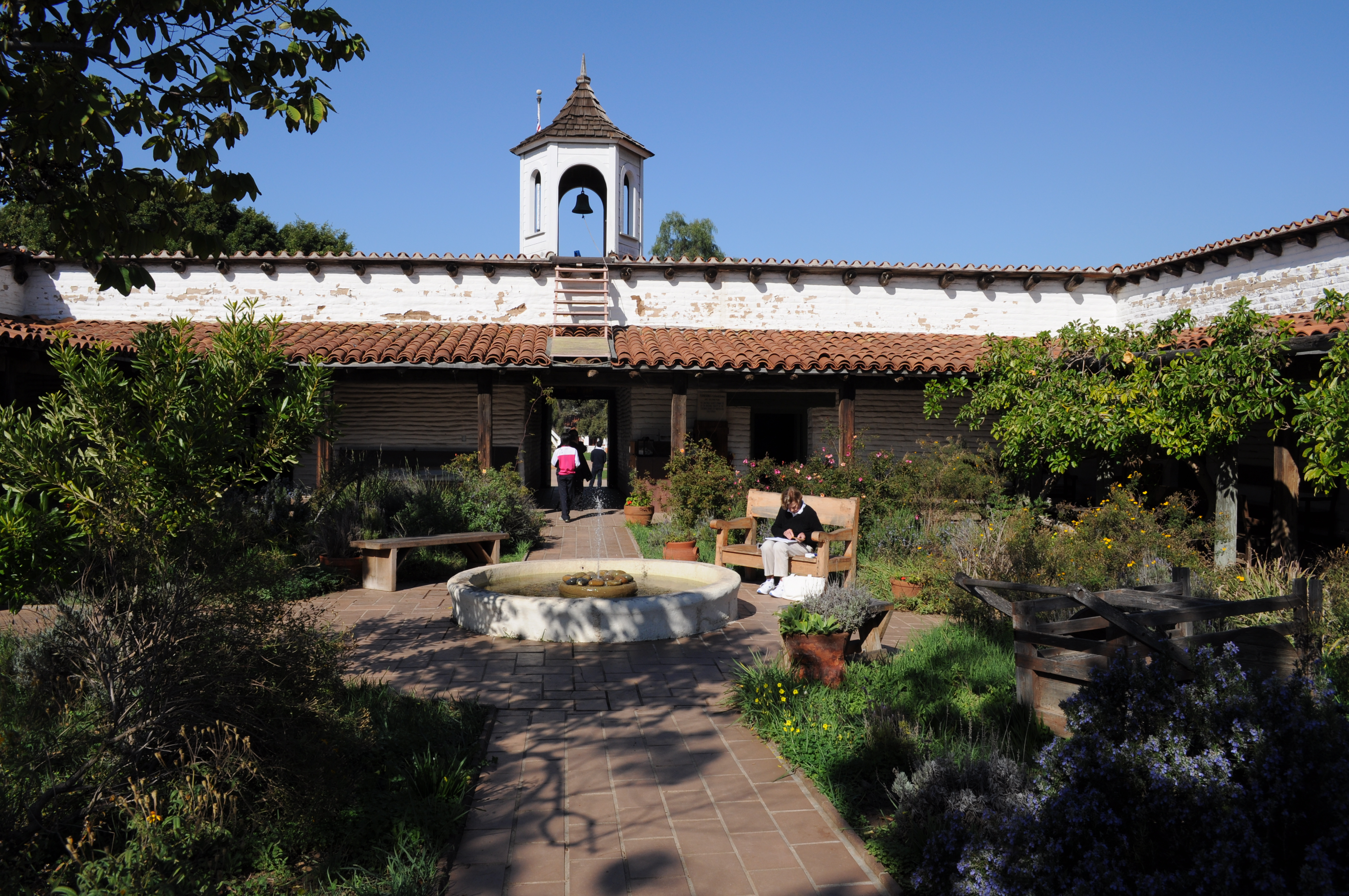
Casa de Estudillo, built 1827, is one of San Diego's oldest buildings and served as inspiration for Helen Hunt Jackson's 1884 novel Ramona.

In 1846, the United States went to war against Mexico and sent a naval and land expedition to conquer Alta California. At first, they had an easy time of it, capturing the major ports including San Diego, but the Californios in southern Alta California struck back. Following the successful revolt in Los Angeles, the American garrison at San Diego was driven out without firing a shot in early October 1846. Mexican partisans held San Diego for three weeks until October 24, 1846, when the Americans recaptured it. For the next several months the Americans were blockaded inside the pueblo. Skirmishes occurred daily and snipers shot into the town every night. The Californios drove cattle away from the pueblo hoping to starve the Americans and their Californio supporters out. On December 1, the American garrison learned that the dragoons of General Stephen W. Kearney were at Warner's Ranch. Commodore Robert F. Stockton sent a mounted force of fifty under Captain Archibald Gillespie to march north to meet him. Their joint command of 150 men, returning to San Diego, encountered about 93 Californios under Andrés Pico.

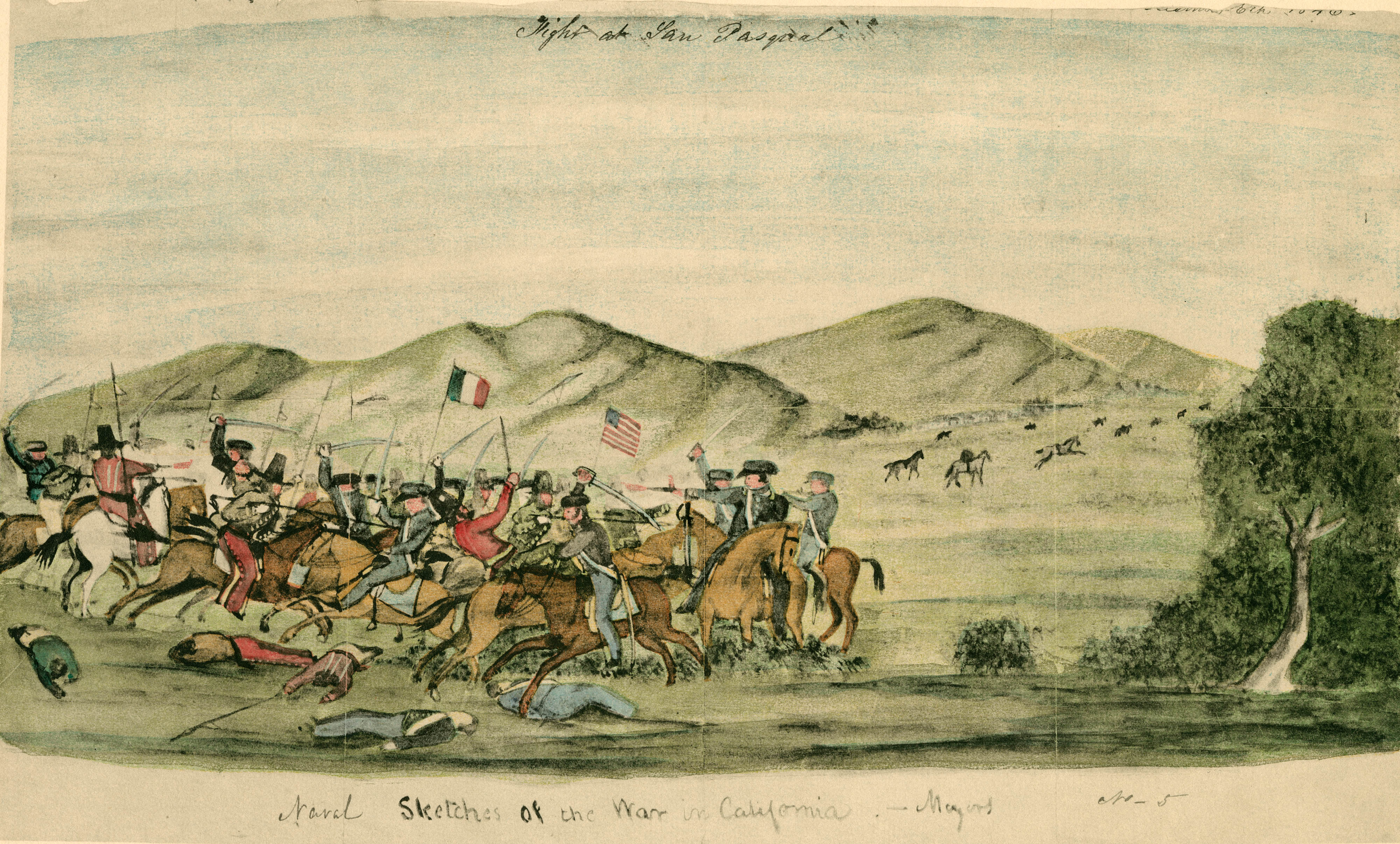
The 1846 Battle of San Pasqual was a decisive battle between American and Californio forces.

In the ensuing Battle of San Pasqual, fought in the San Pasqual Valley which is now part of the city of San Diego, the Americans suffered their worst losses in the campaign. Subsequently, a column led by Lieutenant Gray arrived from San Diego, rescuing Kearny's command. Stockton and Kearny went on to recover Los Angeles and force the capitulation of Alta California with the "Treaty of Cahuenga" on January 13, 1847. As a result of the Mexican–American War of 1846–48, the territory of Alta California, including San Diego, was ceded to the United States by Mexico, under the terms of the Treaty of Guadalupe Hidalgo in 1848. The Mexican negotiators of that treaty tried to retain San Diego as part of Mexico, but the Americans insisted that San Diego was "for every commercial purpose of nearly equal importance to us with that of San Francisco", and the Mexican–American border was eventually established to be one league south of the southernmost point of San Diego Bay.

=== American period ===
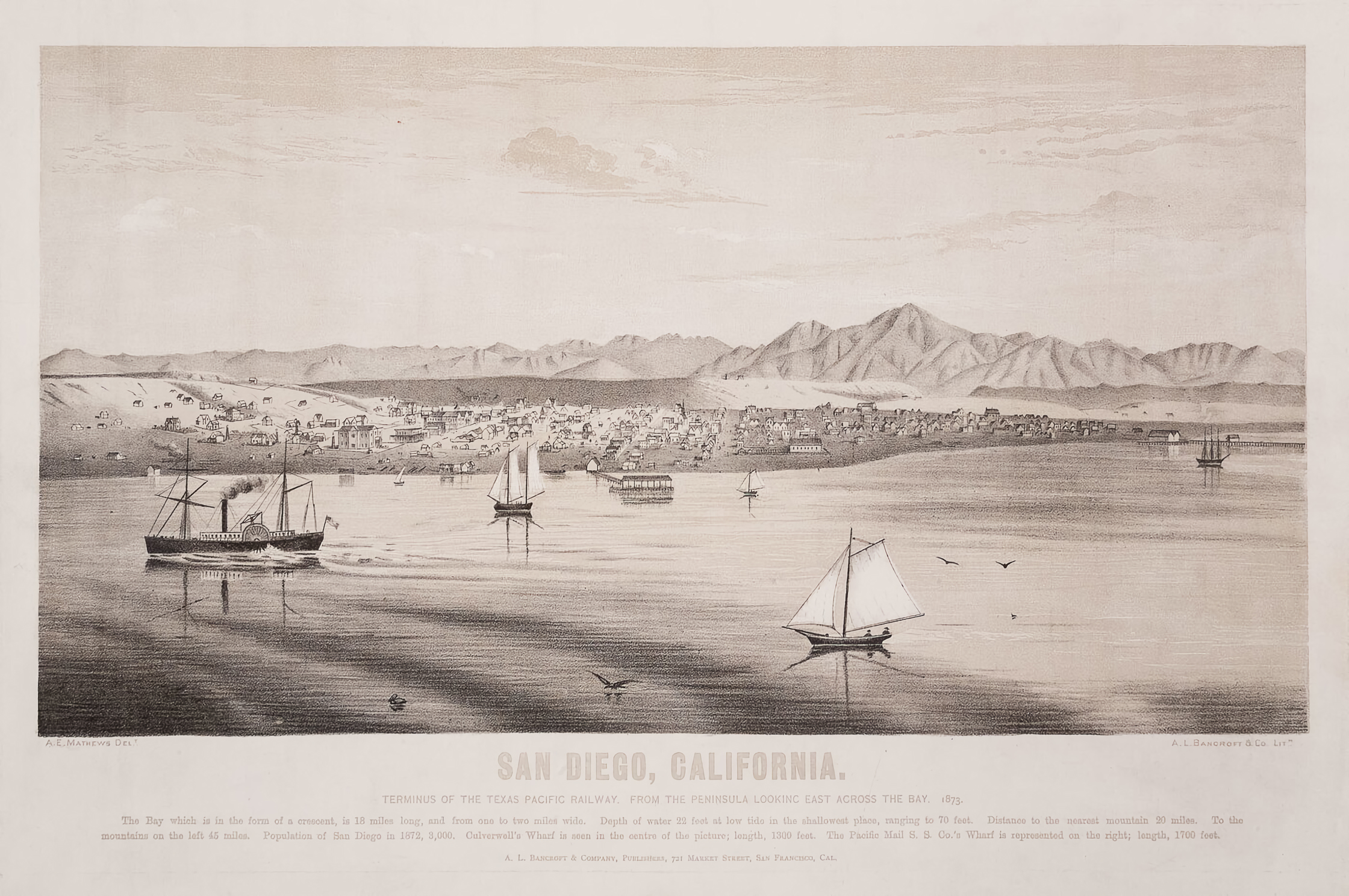
View of San Diego Bay in 1873 following the U.S. conquest of California

The state of California was admitted to the United States in 1850. That same year San Diego was designated the seat of the newly established County of San Diego and was incorporated as a city. Joshua H. Bean, the last alcalde of San Diego, was elected the first mayor. Two years later the city was bankrupt; the California legislature revoked the city's charter and placed it under control of a board of trustees, where it remained until 1889. A city charter was reestablished in 1889, and today's city charter was adopted in 1931.

The original town of San Diego was located at the foot of Presidio Hill, in the area which is now Old Town San Diego State Historic Park. The location was not ideal, being several miles away from navigable water at its port at La Playa. In 1850, William Heath Davis promoted a new development by the bay shore called "New San Diego", several miles south of the original settlement; however, for several decades the new development consisted only of a pier, a few houses and an Army depot for the support of Fort Yuma. After 1854, the fort became supplied by sea and by steamboats on the Colorado River and the depot fell into disuse. From 1857 to 1860, San Diego became the western terminus of the San Antonio-San Diego Mail Line, the earliest overland stagecoach and mail operation from the Eastern United States to California, coming from Texas through New Mexico Territory in less than 30 days.

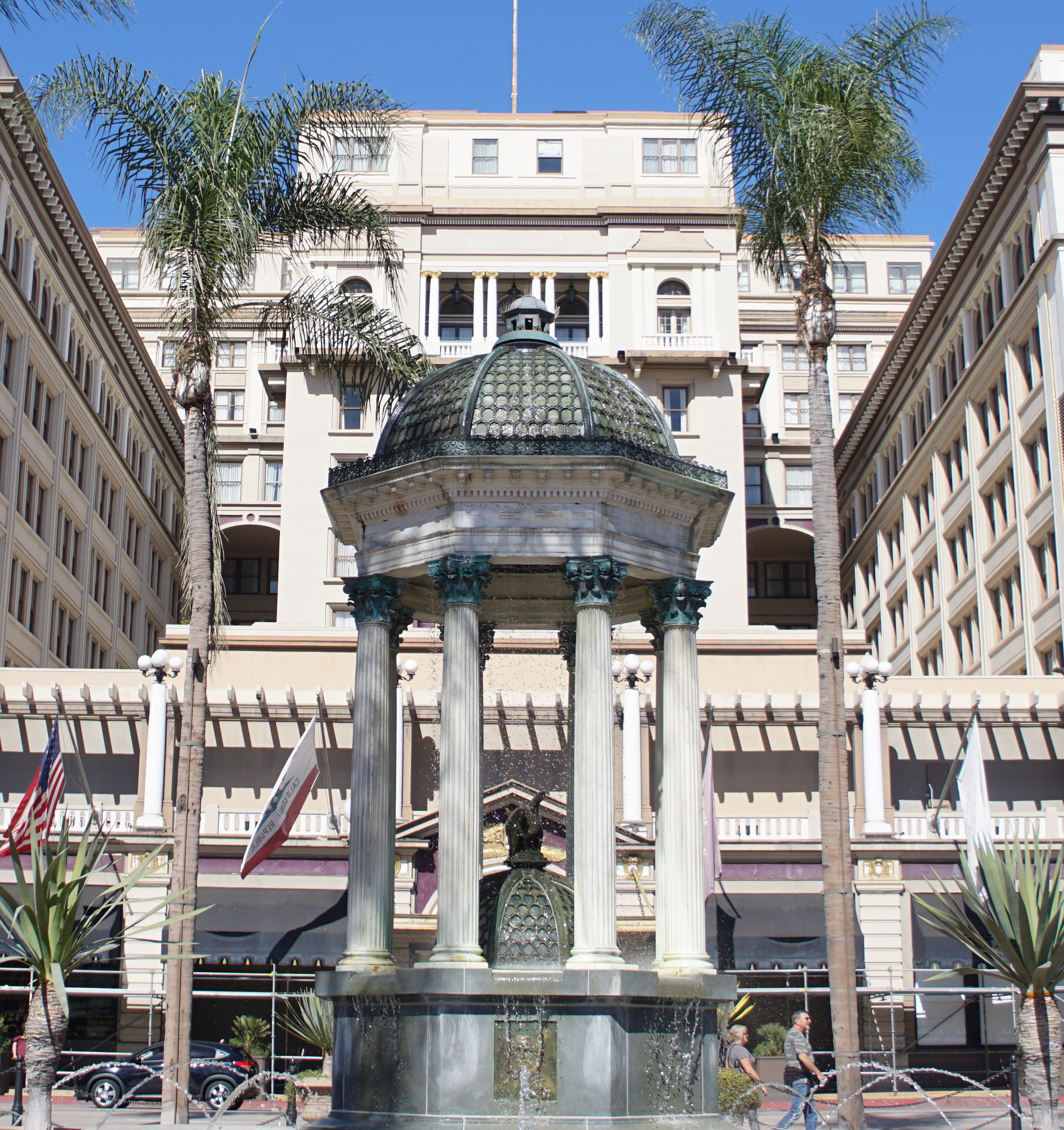
Horton Plaza honors Alonzo Horton, who helped develop Downtown.

In the late 1860s, Alonzo Horton promoted a move to the bayside area, which he called "New Town" and which became downtown San Diego. Horton promoted the area heavily, and people and businesses began to relocate to New Town because its location on San Diego Bay was convenient to shipping. New Town soon eclipsed the original settlement, known to this day as Old Town, and became the economic and governmental heart of the city. Still, San Diego remained a relatively backwater town until the arrival of a railroad connection in 1878.

In 1912, San Diego was the site of a free speech fight between the Industrial Workers of the World and the city government who passed an ordinance forbidding the freedom of speech along an area of "Soapbox Row" that led to civil disobedience, vigilantism, police violence, the abduction of Emma Goldman's husband Ben Reitman and multiple riots. San Diego's proximity to Tijuana during the Mexican Revolution made this one of the most significant free speech fights during the Wobbly era.

In 1916, the neighborhood of Stingaree, the original home of San Diego's first Chinatown and "Soapbox Row", was demolished by anti-vice campaigners to make way for the Gaslamp Quarter.

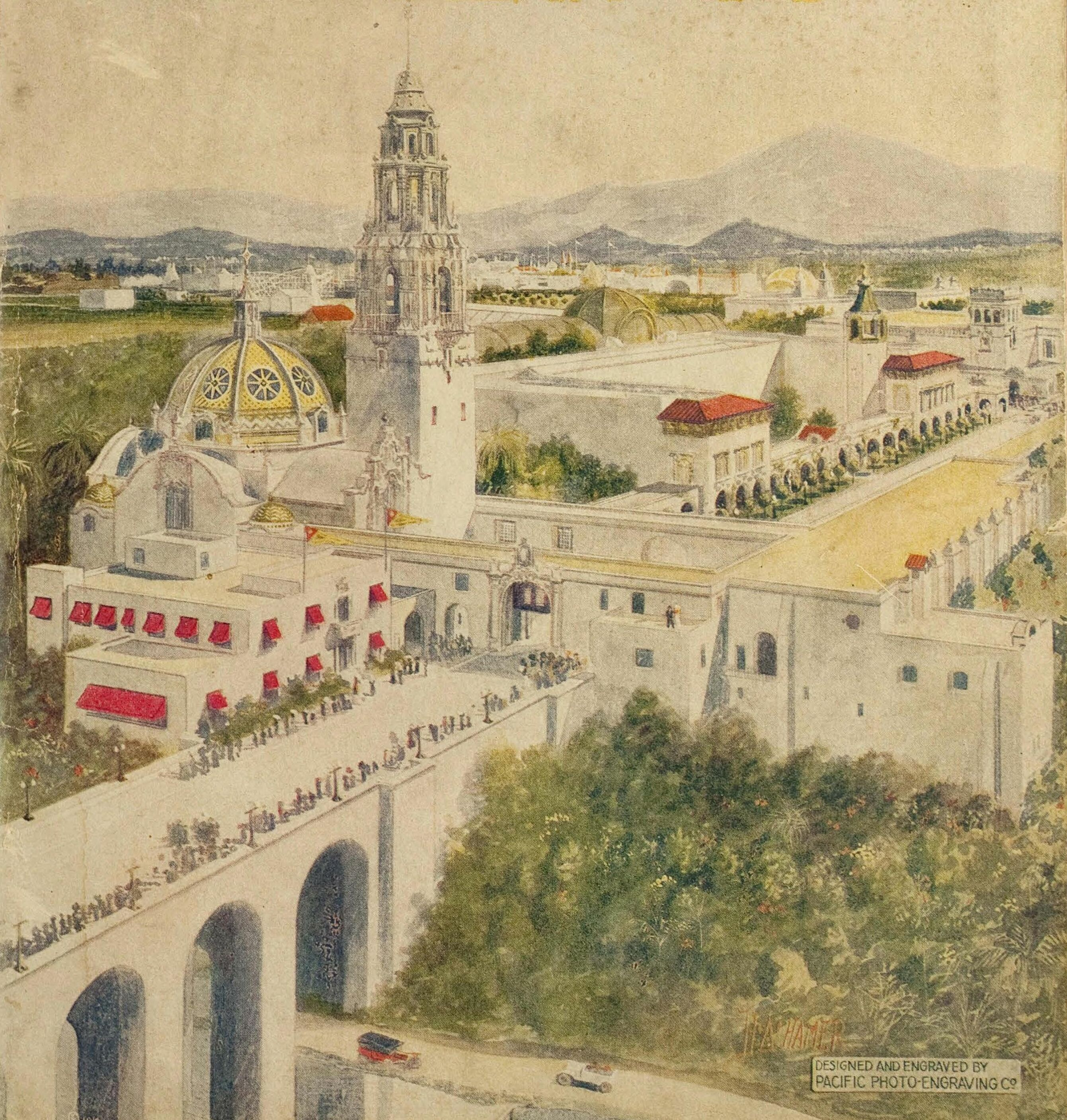
Balboa Park was built for the Panama-California Exposition of 1915.

In the early part of the 20th century, San Diego hosted the World's Fair twice: the Panama–California Exposition in 1915 and the California Pacific International Exposition in 1935. Both expositions were held in Balboa Park, and many of the Spanish/Baroque-style buildings that were built for those expositions remain to this day as central features of the park. The menagerie of exotic animals featured at the 1915 exposition provided the basis for the San Diego Zoo. During the 1950s there was a citywide festival called Fiesta del Pacifico highlighting the area's Spanish and Mexican past.

The southern portion of the Point Loma peninsula was set aside for military purposes as early as 1852. Over the next several decades the Army set up a series of coastal artillery batteries and named the area Fort Rosecrans. Significant U.S. Navy presence began in 1901 with the establishment of the Navy Coaling Station in Point Loma, and expanded greatly during the 1920s. By 1930, the city was host to Naval Base San Diego, Naval Training Center San Diego, San Diego Naval Hospital, Camp Matthews, and Camp Kearny (now Marine Corps Air Station Miramar). The city was also an early center for aviation: as early as World War I, San Diego was proclaiming itself "The Air Capital of the West". The city was home to important airplane developers and manufacturers like Ryan Airlines (later Ryan Aeronautical), founded in 1925, and Consolidated Aircraft (later Convair), founded in 1923. Charles A. Lindbergh's plane, the Spirit of St. Louis, was built in San Diego in 1927 by Ryan Airlines.

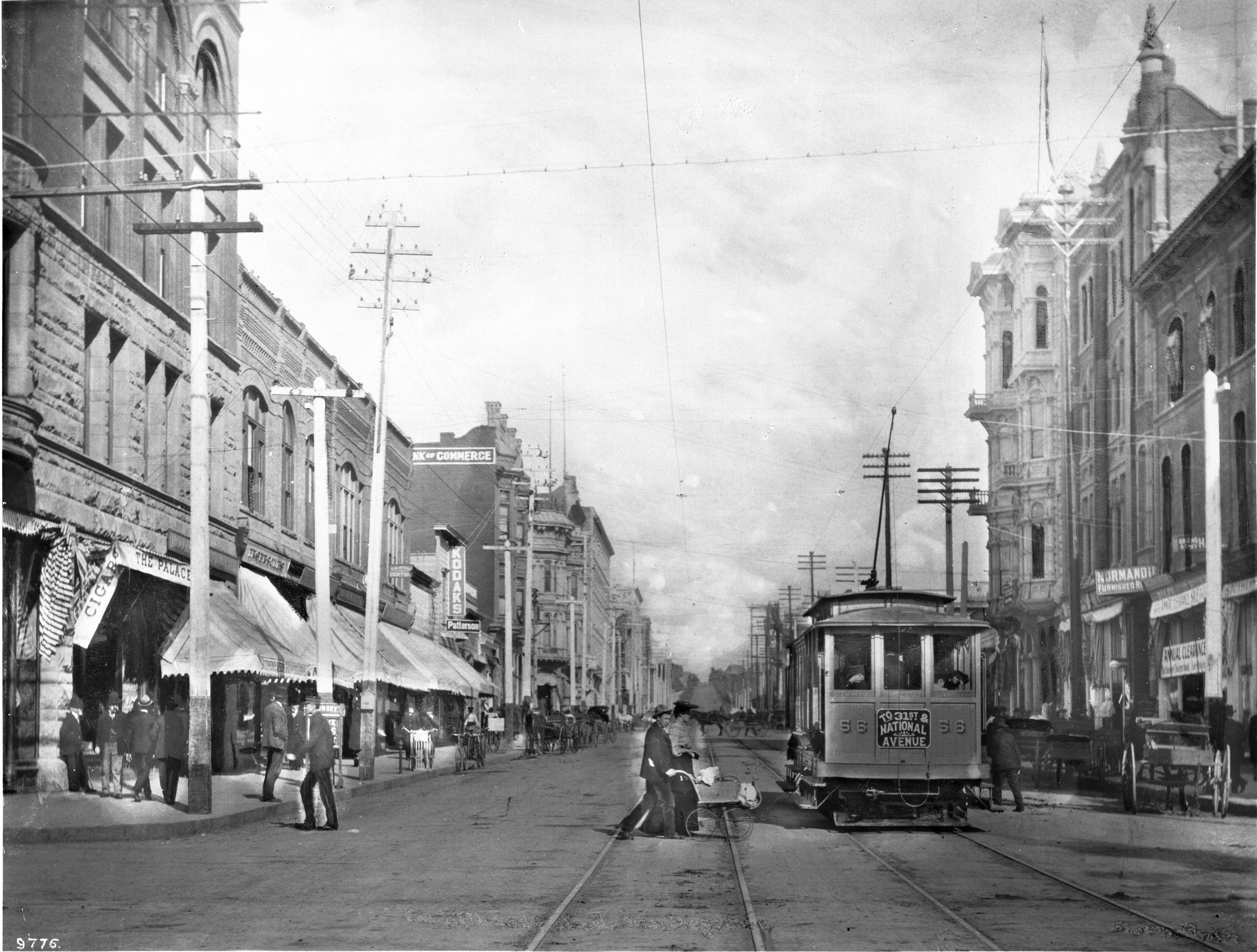
Downtown San Diego, c. 1903

During World War II, San Diego became a major hub of military and defense activity, due to the presence of so many military installations and defense manufacturers. The city's population grew rapidly during and after World War II, more than doubling between 1930 (147,995) and 1950 (333,865). During the final months of the war, the Japanese had a plan to target multiple U.S. cities for biological attack, starting with San Diego. The plan was called "Operation Cherry Blossoms at Night" and called for kamikaze planes filled with fleas infected with plague (Yersinia pestis) to crash into civilian population centers in the city, hoping to spread plague in the city and effectively kill tens of thousands of civilians. The plan was ultimately cancelled by the Japanese months before the end of the war by officials who feared it would lead to unacceptable condemnation or retaliation.

After World War II, the military continued to play a major role in the local economy, but post–Cold War cutbacks took a heavy toll on the local defense and aerospace industries. The resulting downturn led San Diego leaders to seek to diversify the city's economy by focusing on research and science, as well as tourism.

In the early 1960s, Tom Hom would become the first Asian American member of the San Diego City Council. He would be succeeded by Leon Williams, the first Black member of the city council.

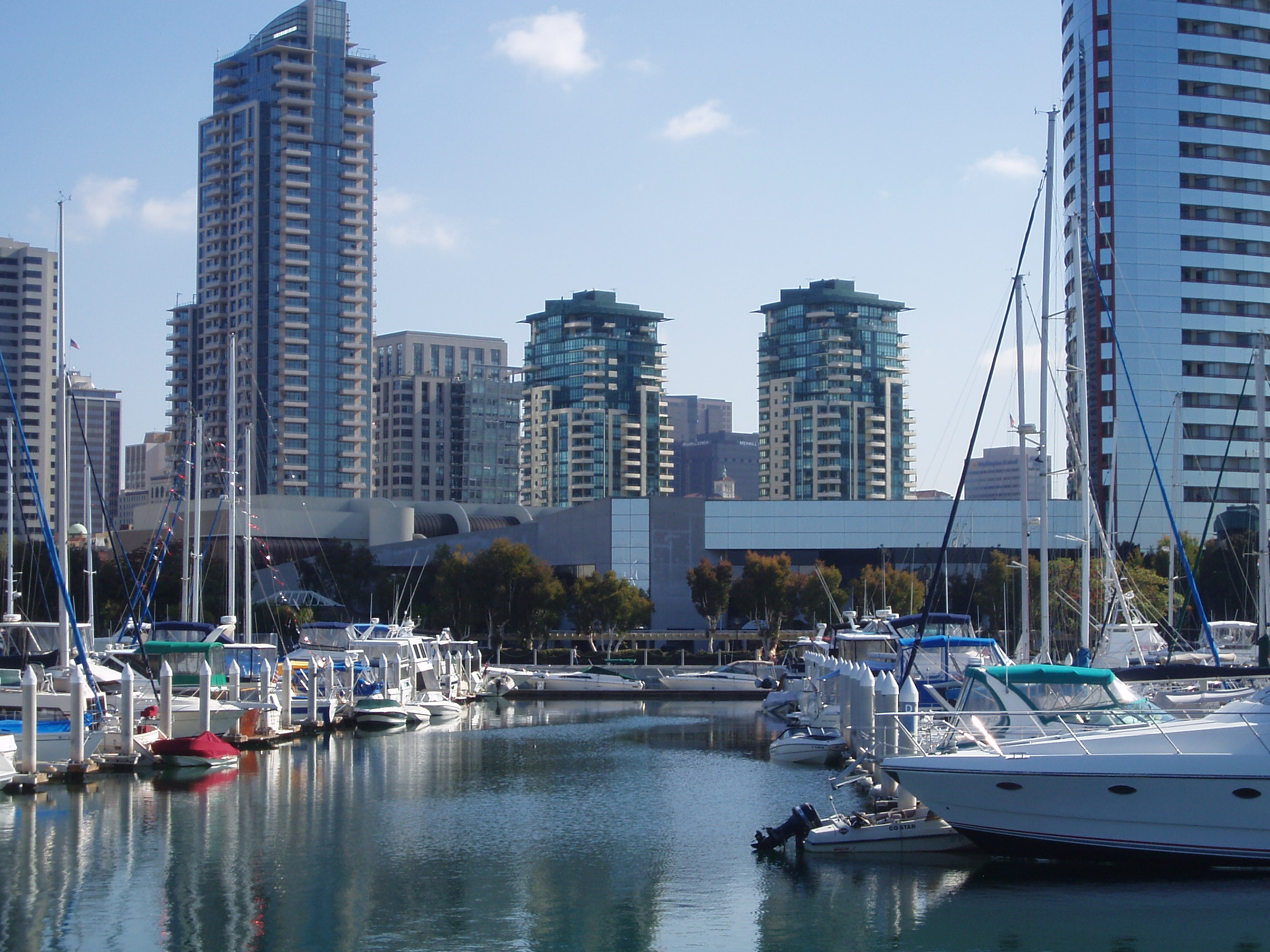
Starting in the 1980s, many areas of Downtown, such as the Marina District, underwent redevelopment.

From the start of the 20th century through the 1970s, the American tuna fishing fleet and tuna canning industry were based in San Diego, "the tuna capital of the world". San Diego's first tuna cannery was founded in 1911, and by the mid-1930s the canneries employed more than 1,000 people. A large fishing fleet supported the canneries, mostly staffed by immigrant fishermen from Japan, and later from the Azores and Italy whose influence is still felt in neighborhoods like Little Italy and Point Loma. Due to rising costs and foreign competition, the last of the canneries closed in the early 1980s.

Downtown San Diego was in decline in the 1960s and 1970s, but experienced some urban renewal since the early 1980s, including the opening of Horton Plaza, the revival of the Gaslamp Quarter, and the construction of the San Diego Convention Center; Petco Park opened in 2004. Outside of downtown, San Diego annexed large swaths of land for suburban expansion to the north and control of the San Ysidro Port of Entry.

As the Cold War ended, the military shrank and so did defense spending. San Diego has since become a center of the emerging biotech industry and is home to telecommunications giant Qualcomm. San Diego had also grown in the tourism industry with the popularity of attractions such as the San Diego Zoo, SeaWorld San Diego, and Legoland California in Carlsbad.

== Geography ==
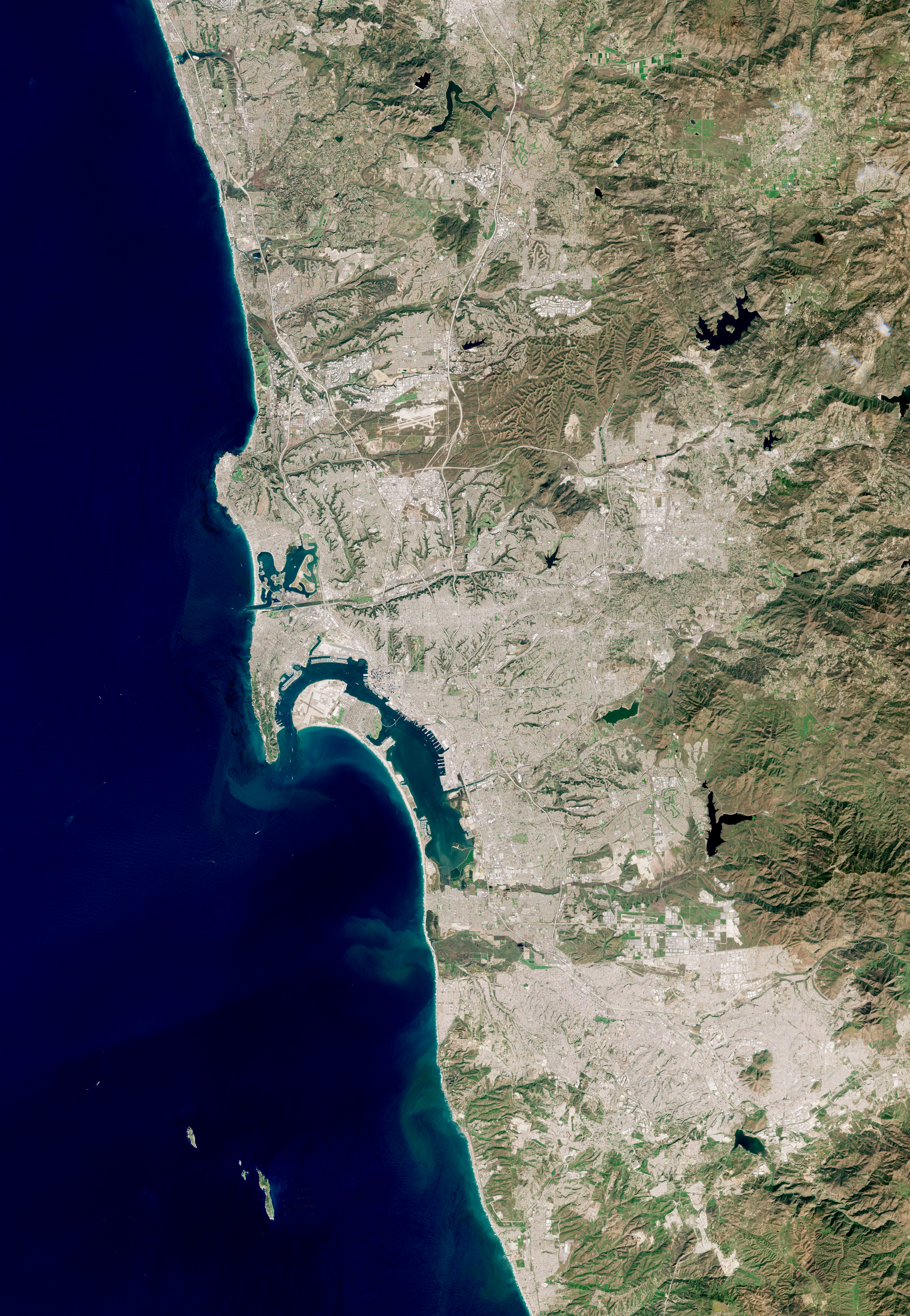
Satellite view of the San Diego–Tijuana area, a transborder agglomeration straddling the Mexico–United States border in the Californias

According to SDSU professor emeritus Monte Marshall, San Diego Bay is "the surface expression of a north-south-trending, nested graben". The Rose Canyon and Point Loma fault zones are part of the San Andreas Fault system. About 40 miles (64 km) east of the bay are the Laguna Mountains in the Peninsular Ranges, which are part of the American Cordillera.

The city lies on approximately 200 deep canyons and hills separating its mesas, creating small pockets of natural open space scattered throughout the city and giving it a hilly geography. Traditionally, San Diegans have built their homes and businesses on the mesas, while leaving the urban canyons relatively wild. Thus, the canyons give parts of the city a segmented feel, creating gaps between otherwise proximate neighborhoods and contributing to a low-density, car-centered environment. The San Diego River runs through the middle of San Diego from east to west, creating a river valley that serves to divide the city into northern and southern segments. Several reservoirs and Mission Trails Regional Park also lie between and separate developed areas of the city.

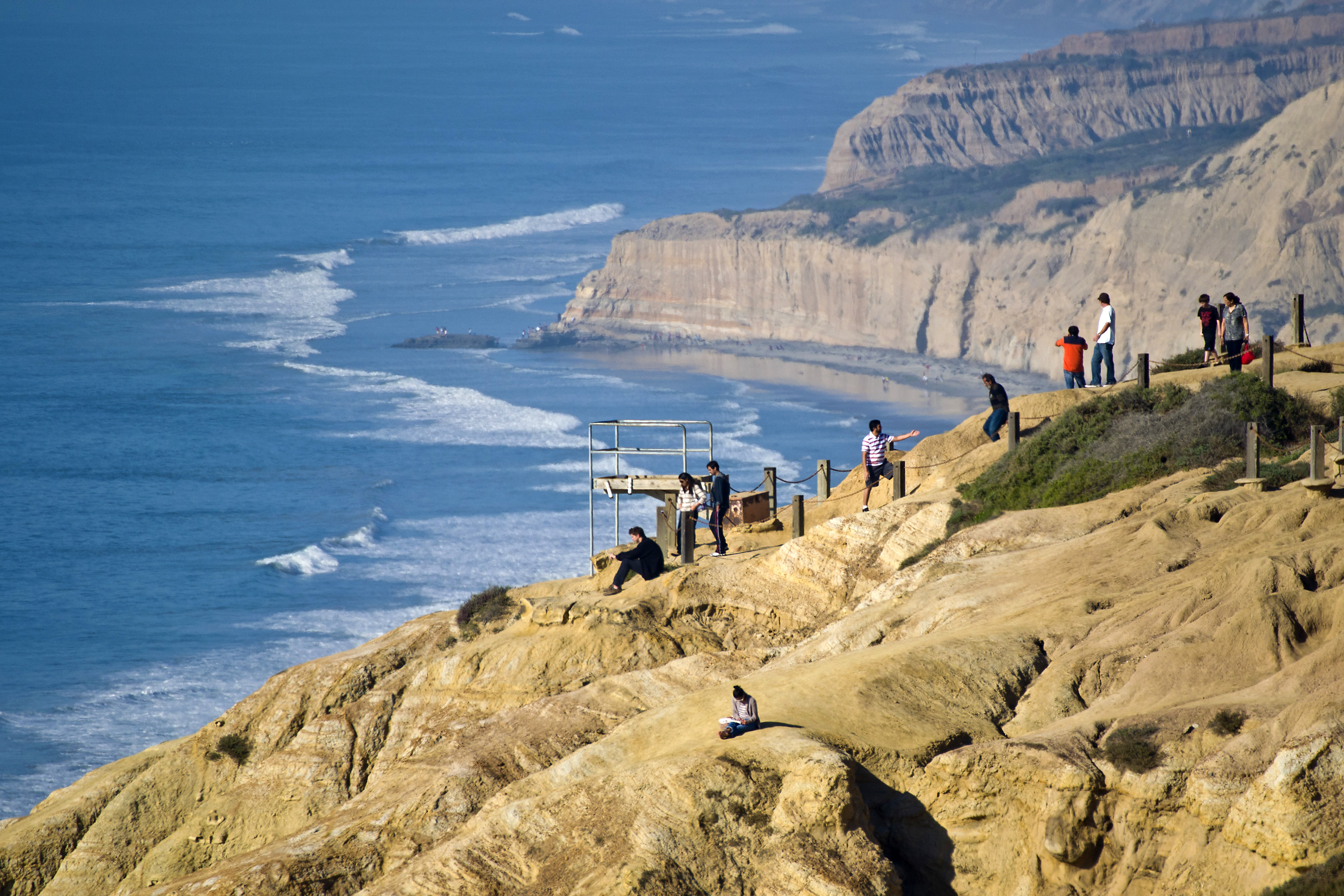
Torrey Pines State Natural Reserve

Notable peaks within the city limits include Cowles Mountain, the highest point in the city at 1,591 feet (485 m); Black Mountain at 1,558 feet (475 m); and Mount Soledad at 824 feet (251 m). The Cuyamaca Mountains and Laguna Mountains rise to the east of the city, and beyond the mountains are desert areas. Cleveland National Forest is a half-hour drive from downtown San Diego. Numerous farms are found in the valleys northeast and southeast of the city.

=== Climate ===
San Diego

Climate chart (precipitation, max. and min. temperature)
J	F	M	A	M	J	J	A	S	O	N	D
2 66 50	2.2 66 52	1.5 67 55	0.7 69 57	0.3 70 60	0.1 72 63	0.1 75 66	0 77 68	0.1 77 66	0.5 75 62	0.8 71 55	1.7 66 50
- █ Average max. and min. temperatures in °F
- █ Precipitation totals in inches
- Source: NOAA
Metric conversion
J	F	M	A	M	J	J	A	S	O	N	D
50 19 10	56 19 11	37 19 13	17 20 14	7.1 21 16	1.3 22 17	2 24 19	0.3 25 20	3 25 19	13 24 16	20 22 13	42 19 10
- █ Average max. and min. temperatures in °C
- █ Precipitation totals in mm

Under the Köppen–Geiger climate classification system, the San Diego area has been variously categorized as having either a hot semi-arid climate (BSh in the original classification and BSkn in modified Köppen classification with the n denoting summer fog) or a hot-summer Mediterranean climate (Csa). San Diego's climate is characterized by warm, dry summers and mild winters, with most of the annual precipitation falling between December and March. The city has a mild climate year-round, with an average of 201 days above 70 °F (21 °C) and low rainfall (9–13 inches [230–330 mm] annually).

The climate in San Diego, like most of Southern California, often varies significantly over short geographical distances, resulting in microclimates. In San Diego, this is mostly because of the city's topography (the Bay, and the numerous hills, mountains, and canyons). Frequently, particularly during the "May gray/June gloom" period, a thick "marine layer" cloud cover keeps the air cool and damp within a few miles of the coast, but yields to bright cloudless sunshine approximately 5–10 miles (8–16 km) inland. Sometimes the June gloom lasts into July, causing cloudy skies over most of San Diego for the entire day. Even in the absence of June gloom, inland areas experience much more significant temperature variations than coastal areas, where the ocean serves as a moderating influence. Thus, for example, downtown San Diego averages January lows of 50 °F (10 °C) and August highs of 78 °F (26 °C). The city of El Cajon, just 12 miles (19 km) inland from downtown San Diego, averages January lows of 42 °F (6 °C) and August highs of 88 °F (31 °C).

The average surface temperature of the water at Scripps Pier in the California Current has increased by almost 3 °F (1.7 °C) since 1950, according to scientists at Scripps Institution of Oceanography. Additionally, the mean minimum is now above 40 °F (4 °C), putting San Diego in hardiness zone 11, with the last freeze having occurred many decades ago.

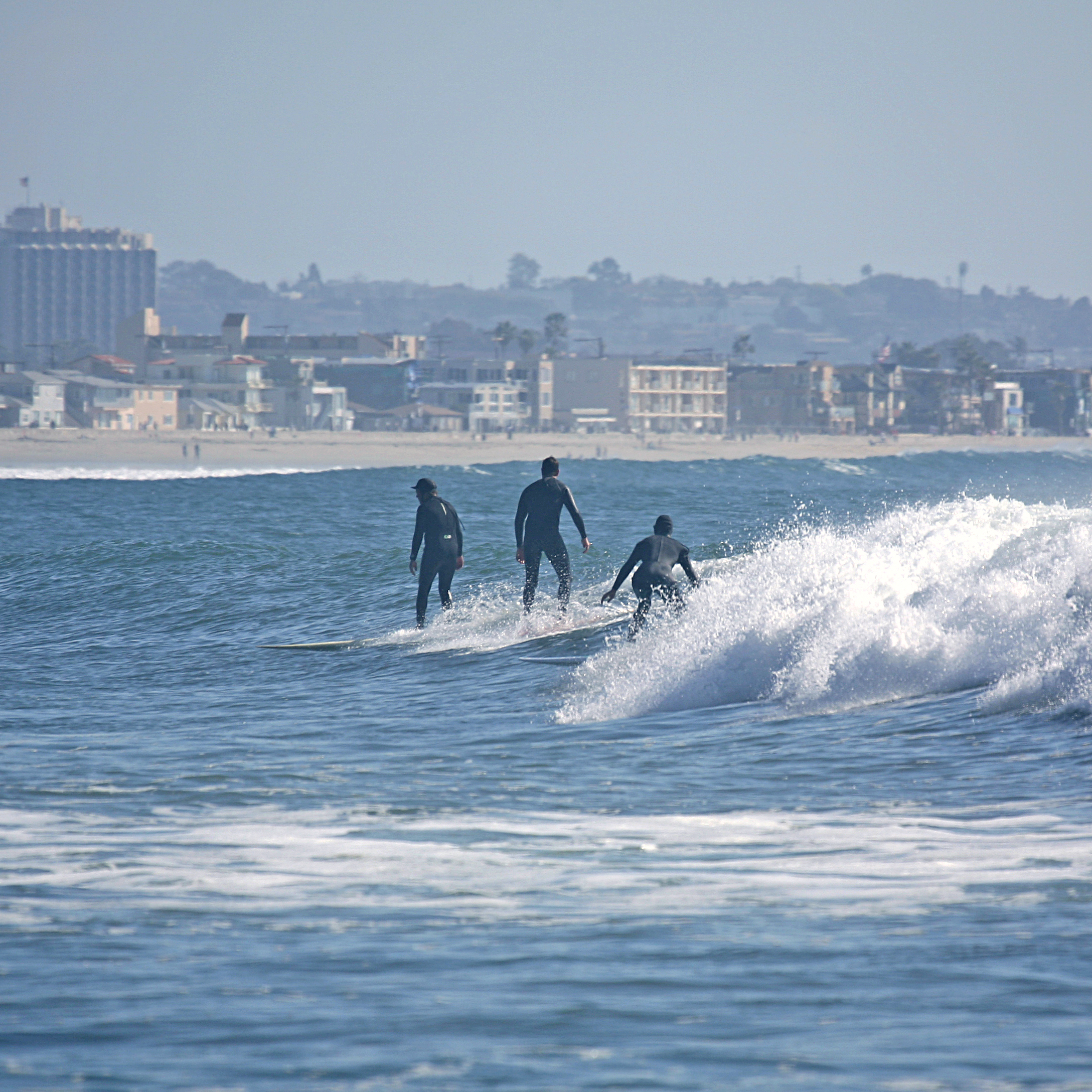
Surfers at Pacific Beach

Annual rainfall along the coast averages 10.65 inches (271 mm) and the median is 9.6 inches (240 mm). The months of December through March supply most of the rain, with February the only month averaging 2 inches (51 mm) or more. The months of May through September tend to be almost completely dry. Although there are few wet days per month during the rainy period, rainfall can be heavy when it does fall. Rainfall is usually greater in the higher elevations of San Diego; some of the higher areas can receive 11–15 inches (280–380 mm) per year. Variability from year to year can be dramatic: in the wettest years of 1883/1884 and 1940/1941, more than 24 inches (610 mm) fell, whilst in the driest years there was as little as 3.2 inches (80 mm). The wettest month on record is December 1921 with 9.21 inches (234 mm).

Snow in the city is rare, having been observed only six times in the century and a half that records have been kept. On February 21, 2019, snow fell and accumulated in residential areas of the city, but none fell in the downtown area.

Climate data for San Diego Int'l Airport (1991–2020 normals, (Note: Mean monthly maxima and minima (i.e. the highest and lowest temperature readings during an entire month or year) calculated based on data at said location from 1991 to 2020.) extremes 1874–present) (Note: Official precipitation records for San Diego were kept at the Weather Bureau Office in downtown from October 1850 to December 1859 at the Mission San Diego and from November 1871 to June 1939 and a variety of buildings at downtown, and at San Diego Int'l (Lindbergh Field) since July 1939. Temperature records, however, only date from October 1874. For more information on data coverage, see ThreadEx)
Month	Jan	Feb	Mar	Apr	May	Jun	Jul	Aug	Sep	Oct	Nov	Dec	Year
Record high °F (°C)	88 (31)	91 (33)	99 (37)	98 (37)	98 (37)	101 (38)	100 (38)	98 (37)	111 (44)	107 (42)	100 (38)	88 (31)	111 (44)
Mean maximum °F (°C)	78.8 (26.0)	78.6 (25.9)	80.2 (26.8)	82.1 (27.8)	79.3 (26.3)	79.6 (26.4)	82.9 (28.3)	85.2 (29.6)	90.6 (32.6)	87.8 (31.0)	85.4 (29.7)	77.0 (25.0)	94.0 (34.4)
Mean daily maximum °F (°C)	66.4 (19.1)	66.2 (19.0)	67.0 (19.4)	68.8 (20.4)	69.5 (20.8)	71.7 (22.1)	75.3 (24.1)	77.3 (25.2)	77.2 (25.1)	74.6 (23.7)	70.7 (21.5)	66.0 (18.9)	70.9 (21.6)
Daily mean °F (°C)	58.4 (14.7)	59.0 (15.0)	60.7 (15.9)	62.9 (17.2)	64.8 (18.2)	67.2 (19.6)	70.7 (21.5)	72.4 (22.4)	71.7 (22.1)	68.1 (20.1)	62.7 (17.1)	57.9 (14.4)	64.7 (18.2)
Mean daily minimum °F (°C)	50.3 (10.2)	51.8 (11.0)	54.5 (12.5)	57.1 (13.9)	60.0 (15.6)	62.6 (17.0)	66.1 (18.9)	67.5 (19.7)	66.2 (19.0)	61.5 (16.4)	54.8 (12.7)	49.8 (9.9)	58.5 (14.7)
Mean minimum °F (°C)	43.7 (6.5)	46.1 (7.8)	48.7 (9.3)	51.9 (11.1)	55.8 (13.2)	59.3 (15.2)	63.0 (17.2)	63.9 (17.7)	61.8 (16.6)	55.5 (13.1)	48.2 (9.0)	43.0 (6.1)	42.6 (5.9)
Record low °F (°C)	25 (−4)	34 (1)	36 (2)	39 (4)	45 (7)	50 (10)	54 (12)	54 (12)	50 (10)	43 (6)	36 (2)	32 (0)	25 (−4)
Average precipitation inches (mm)	1.98 (50)	2.20 (56)	1.46 (37)	0.65 (17)	0.28 (7.1)	0.05 (1.3)	0.08 (2.0)	0.01 (0.25)	0.12 (3.0)	0.50 (13)	0.79 (20)	1.67 (42)	9.79 (249)
Average precipitation days (≥ 0.01 in)	6.5	7.1	6.2	3.8	2.2	0.7	0.7	0.3	0.9	2.4	3.7	5.8	40.3
Average relative humidity (%)	63.1	65.7	67.3	67.0	70.6	74.0	74.6	74.1	72.7	69.4	66.3	63.7	69.0
Average dew point °F (°C)	42.8 (6.0)	45.3 (7.4)	47.3 (8.5)	49.5 (9.7)	53.1 (11.7)	57.0 (13.9)	61.2 (16.2)	62.4 (16.9)	60.6 (15.9)	55.6 (13.1)	48.6 (9.2)	43.2 (6.2)	52.2 (11.2)
Mean monthly sunshine hours	239.3	227.4	261.0	276.2	250.5	242.4	304.7	295.0	253.3	243.4	230.1	231.3	3,054.6
Percentage possible sunshine	75	74	70	71	58	57	70	71	68	69	73	74	69
Source: NOAA (sun, relative humidity, and dew point 1961–1990)

=== Ecology ===
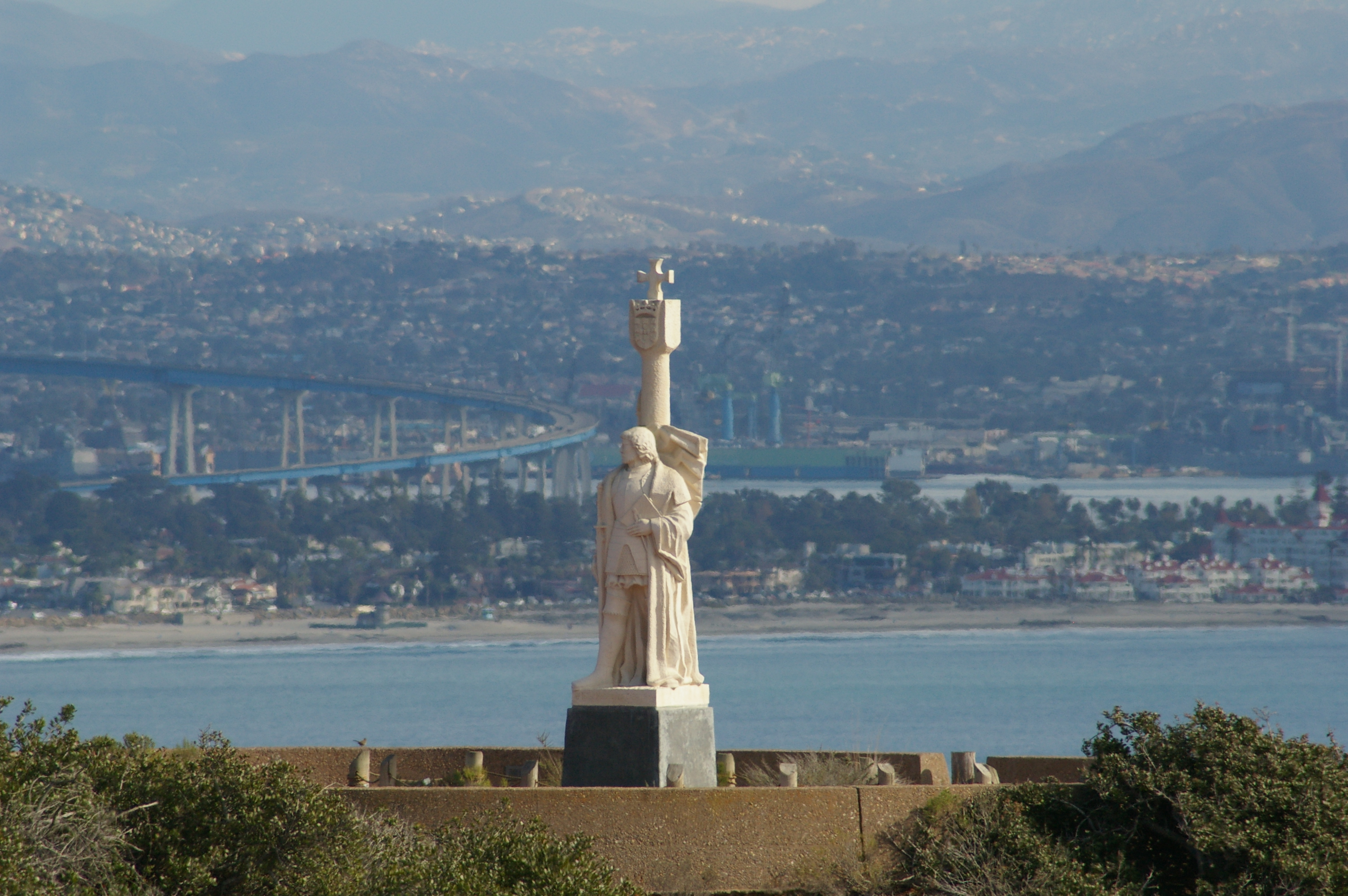
View of Coronado from Cabrillo National Monument

Like much of Southern California, the majority of San Diego's current area was originally occupied on the west by coastal sage scrub and on the east by chaparral, plant communities made up mostly of drought-resistant shrubs. The steep and varied topography and proximity to the ocean create a number of different habitats within the city limits, including tidal marsh and canyons. The chaparral and coastal sage scrub habitats in low elevations along the coast are prone to wildfire, and the rates of fire increased in the 20th century, due primarily to fires starting near the borders of urban and wild areas.

San Diego's broad city limits encompass a number of large nature preserves, including Torrey Pines State Natural Reserve, Los Peñasquitos Canyon Preserve, and Mission Trails Regional Park. Torrey Pines State Natural Reserve and a coastal strip continuing to the north constitute one of only two locations where the rare species of Torrey Pine, Pinus torreyana, is found. Due to the steep topography that prevents or discourages building, along with some efforts for preservation, there are also a large number of canyons within the city limits that serve as nature preserves, including Switzer Canyon, Tecolote Canyon Natural Park, and Marian Bear Memorial Park in San Clemente Canyon, as well as a number of small parks and preserves.

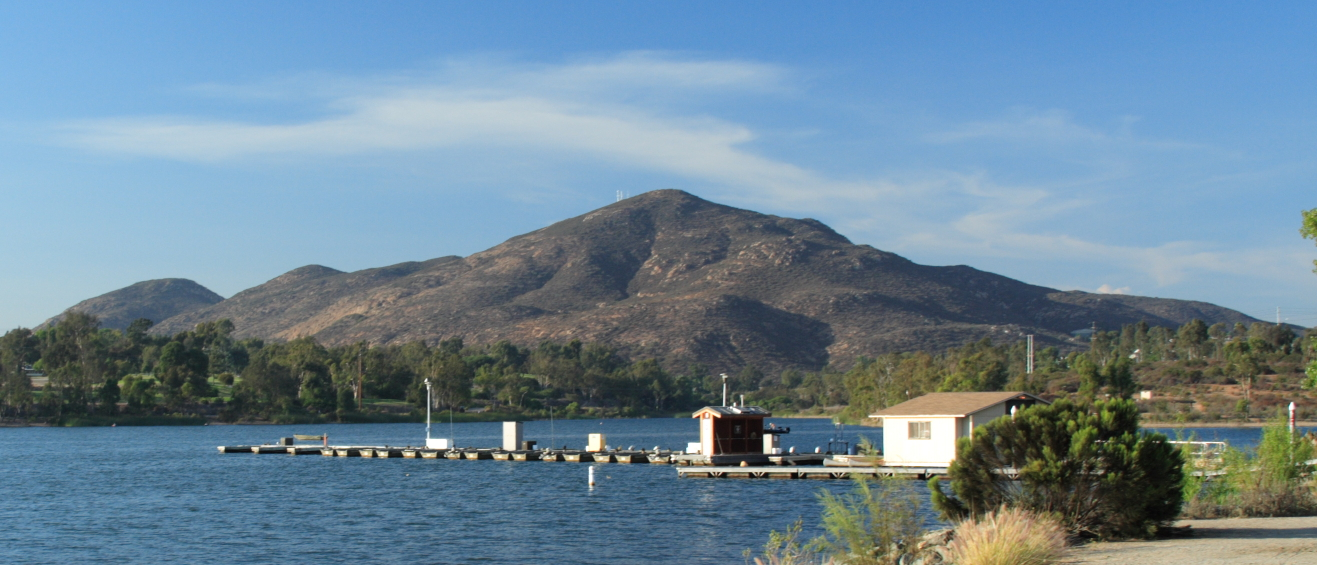
Cowles Mountain from Lake Murray

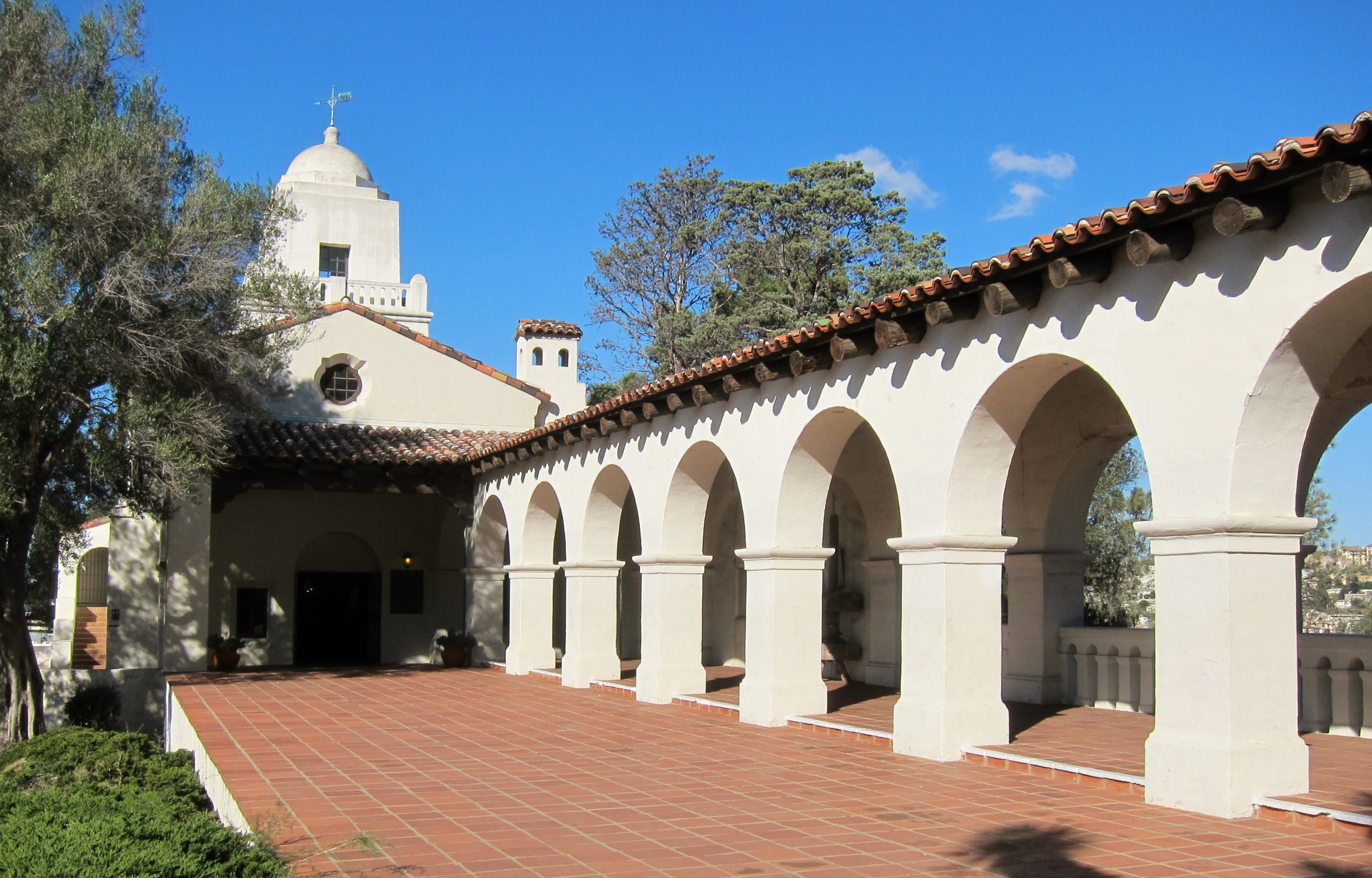
Serra Museum at Presidio Park

San Diego County has one of the highest counts of animal and plant species that appear on the endangered list of counties in the United States. Because of its diversity of habitat and its position on the Pacific Flyway, San Diego County has recorded 492 different bird species, more than any other region in the country. San Diego always scores high in the number of bird species observed in the annual Christmas Bird Count, sponsored by the Audubon Society, and it is known as one of the "birdiest" areas in the United States.

San Diego and its backcountry suffer from periodic wildfires. In October 2003, San Diego was the site of the Cedar Fire, at that time the largest wildfire in California over the past century. The fire burned 280,000 acres (1,100 km^{2}), killed 15 people, and destroyed more than 2,200 homes. In addition to damage caused by the fire, smoke resulted in a significant increase in emergency room visits; the poor air quality caused San Diego County schools to close for a week. The October 2007 California wildfires destroyed some areas, particularly within Rancho Bernardo, as well as the nearby communities of Rancho Santa Fe and Ramona.

=== Neighborhoods ===
The City of San Diego recognizes 52 individual areas as Community Planning Areas. Within a given planning area there may be several distinct neighborhoods. Altogether the city contains more than 100 identified neighborhoods.

Downtown San Diego is located on San Diego Bay. Balboa Park encompasses several mesas and canyons to the northeast, surrounded by older, dense urban communities including Hillcrest and North Park. To the east and southeast lie City Heights, the College Area, and Southeast San Diego. To the north lies Mission Valley and Interstate 8. The communities north of the valley and freeway, and south of Marine Corps Air Station Miramar, include Clairemont, Kearny Mesa, Tierrasanta, and Navajo. Stretching north from Miramar are the northern suburbs of Mira Mesa, Scripps Ranch, Rancho Peñasquitos, and Rancho Bernardo. The far northeast portion of the city encompasses Lake Hodges and the San Pasqual Valley, which holds an agricultural preserve. Carmel Valley and Del Mar Heights occupy the northwest corner of the city. To their south are Torrey Pines State Natural Reserve and the business center of the Golden Triangle. Further south are the beach and coastal communities of La Jolla, Pacific Beach, Mission Beach, and Ocean Beach. Point Loma occupies the peninsula across San Diego Bay from downtown. The communities of South San Diego (an Exclave), such as San Ysidro and Otay Mesa, are located next to the Mexico–United States border, and are physically separated from the rest of the city by the cities of National City and Chula Vista. A narrow strip of land at the bottom of San Diego Bay connects these southern neighborhoods with the rest of the city.

Selection of neighborhoods in San Diego

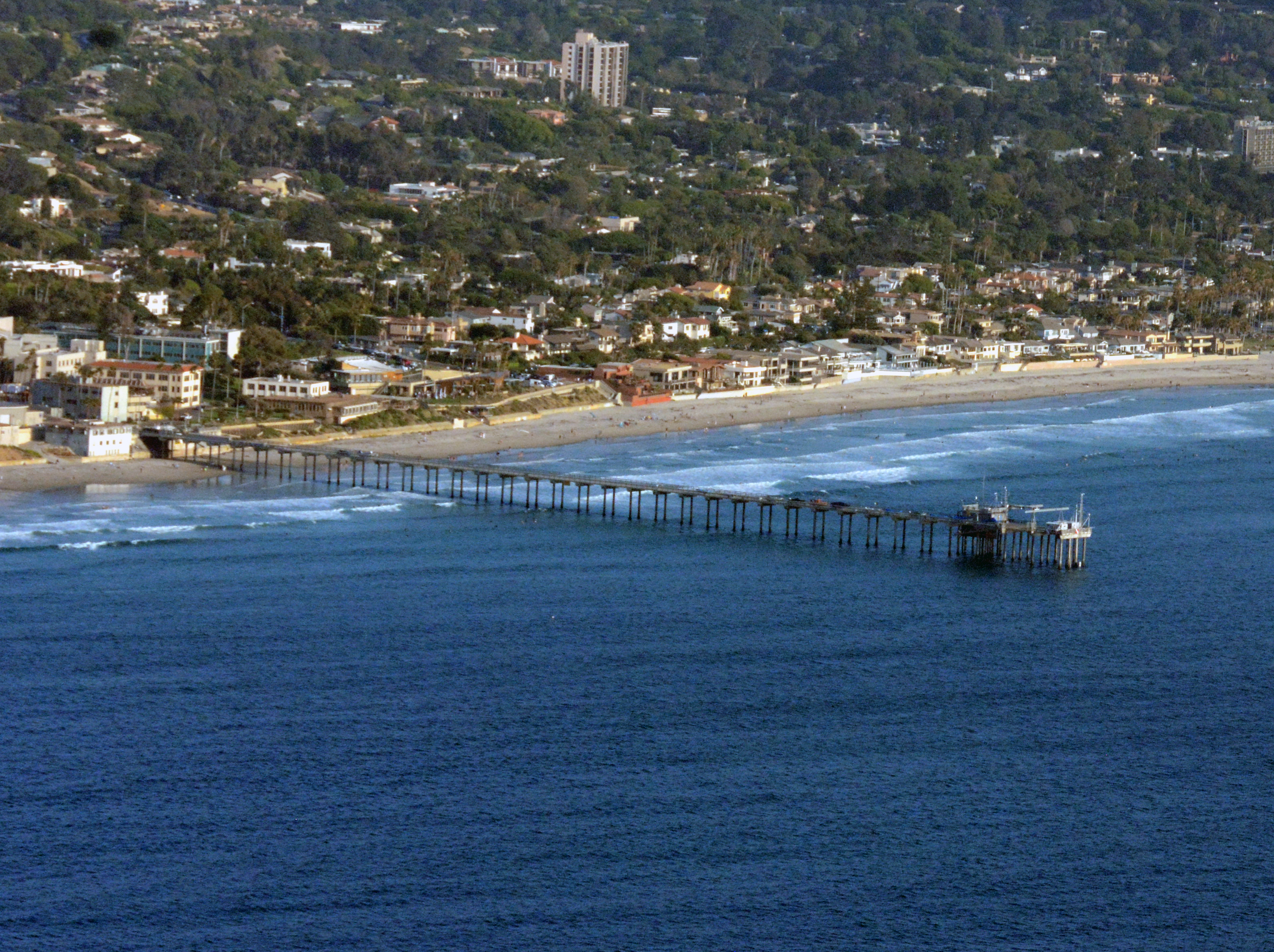
La Jolla

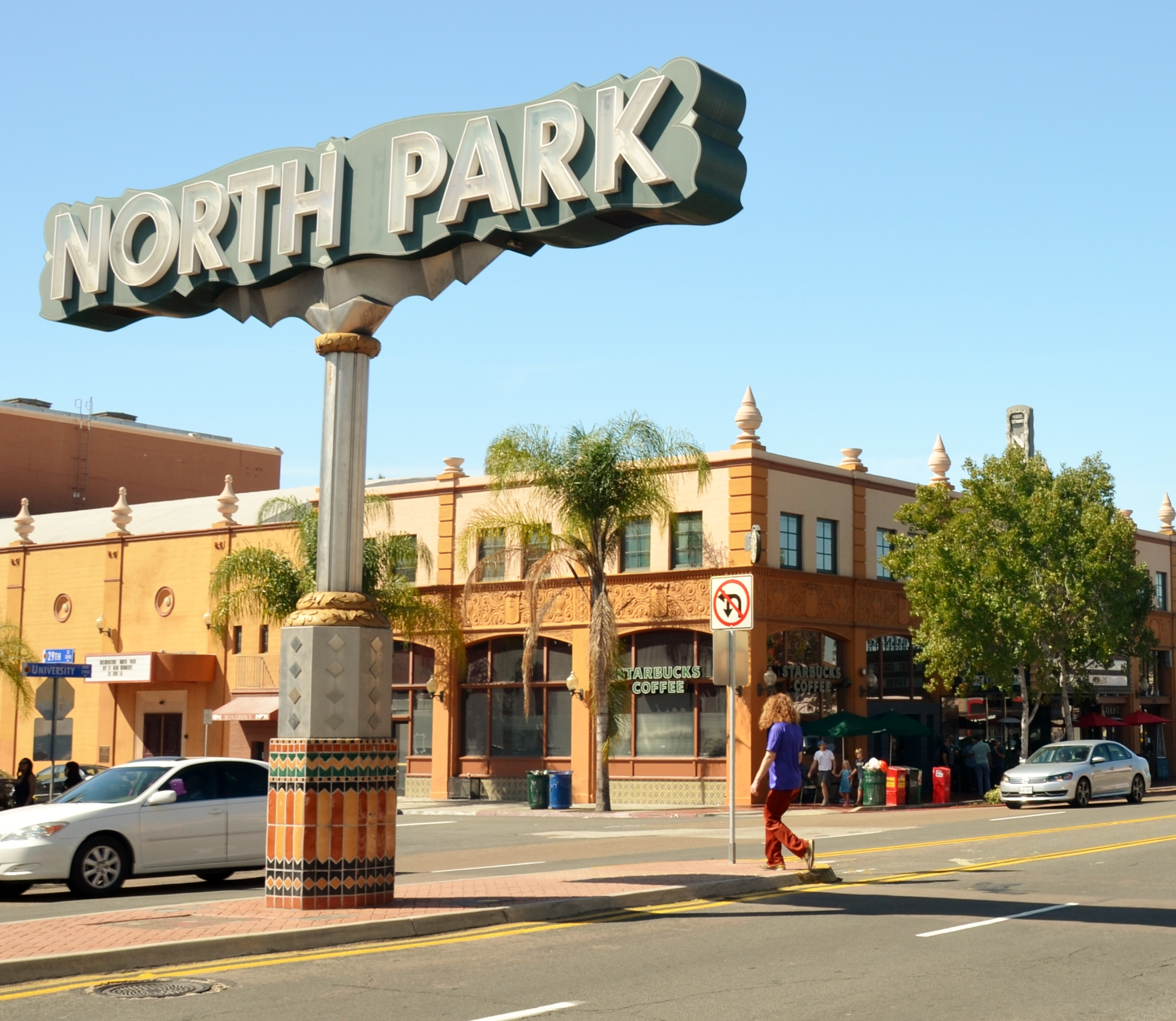
North Park

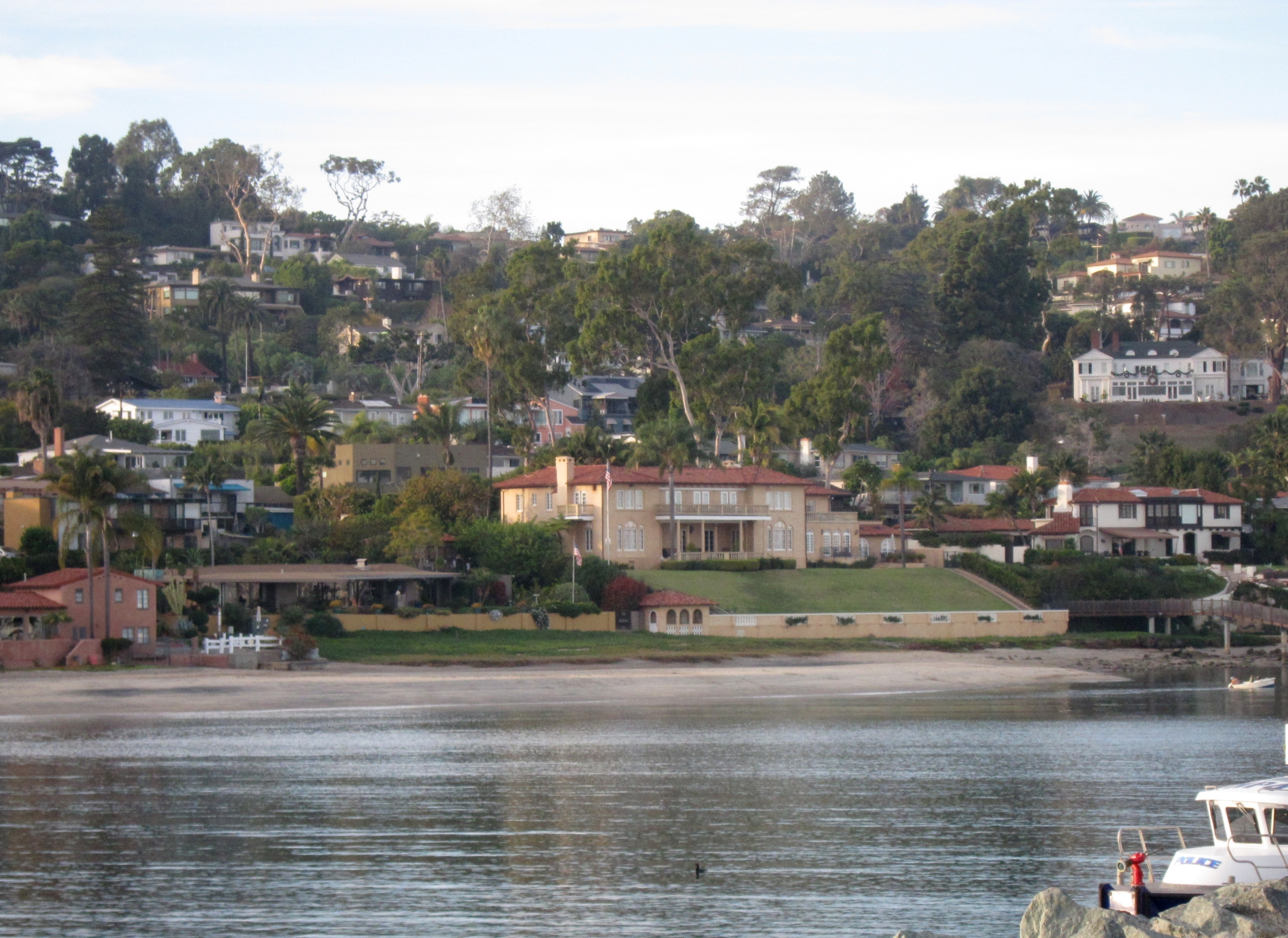
Point Loma

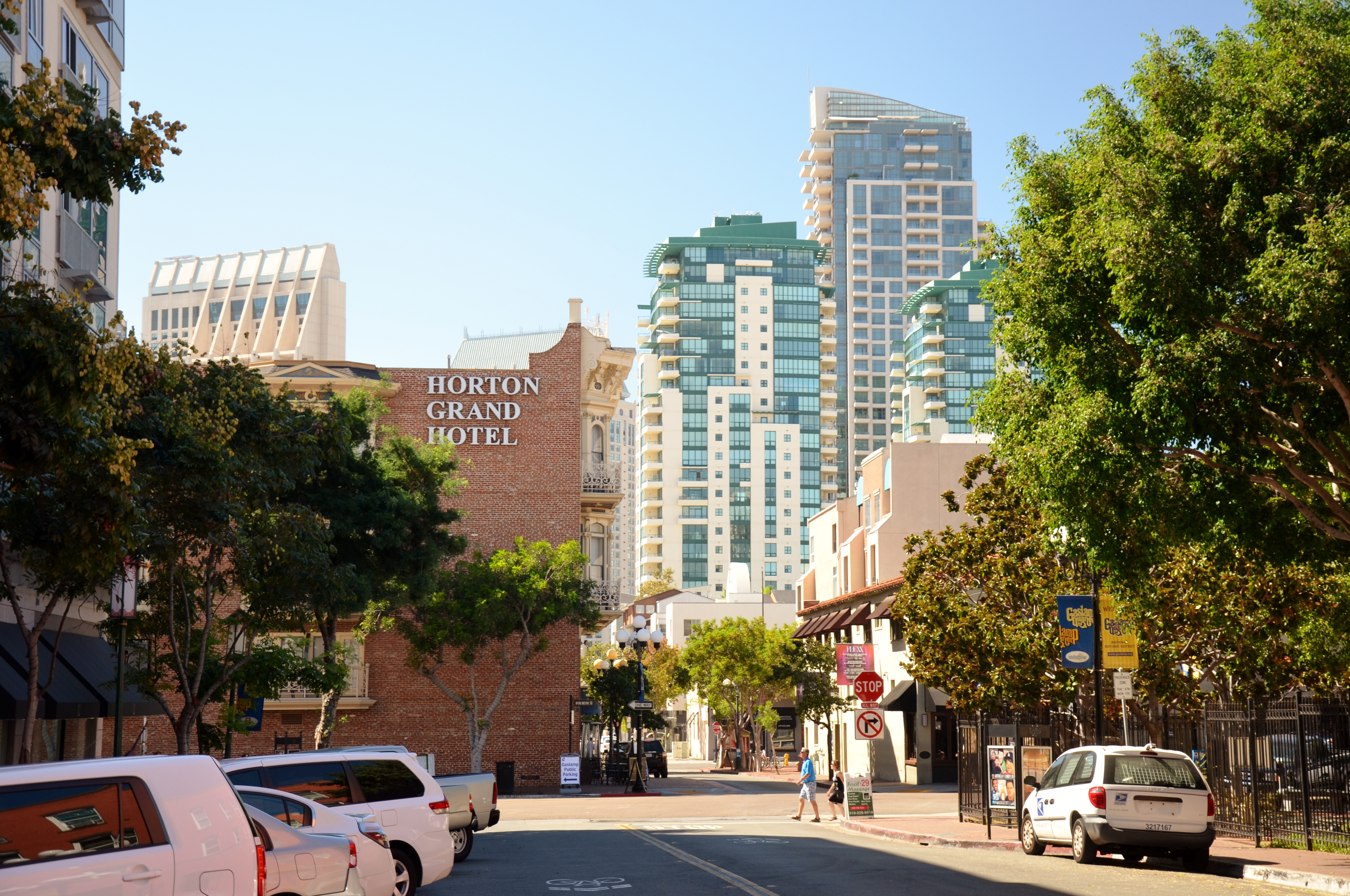
East Village

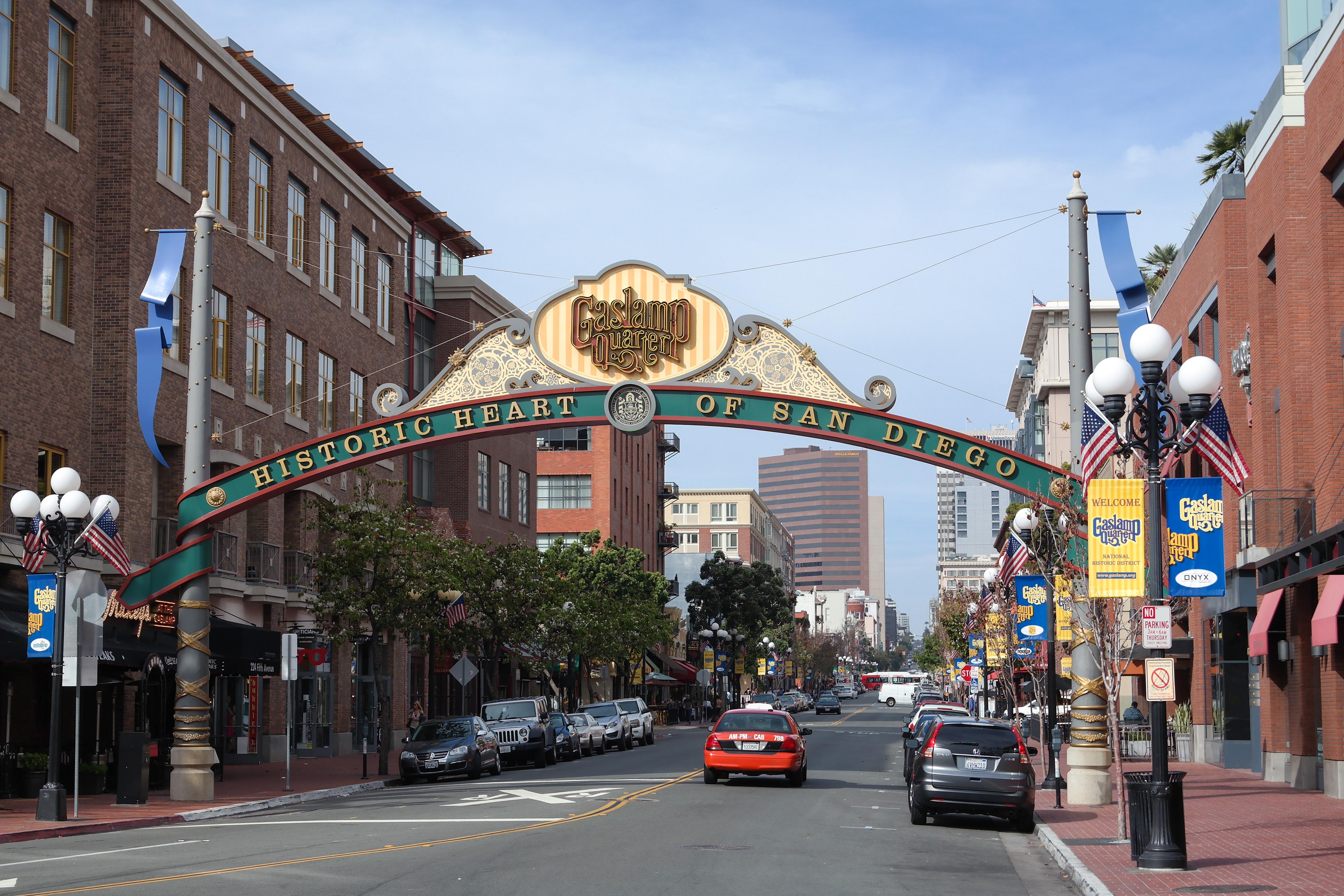
Gaslamp Quarter

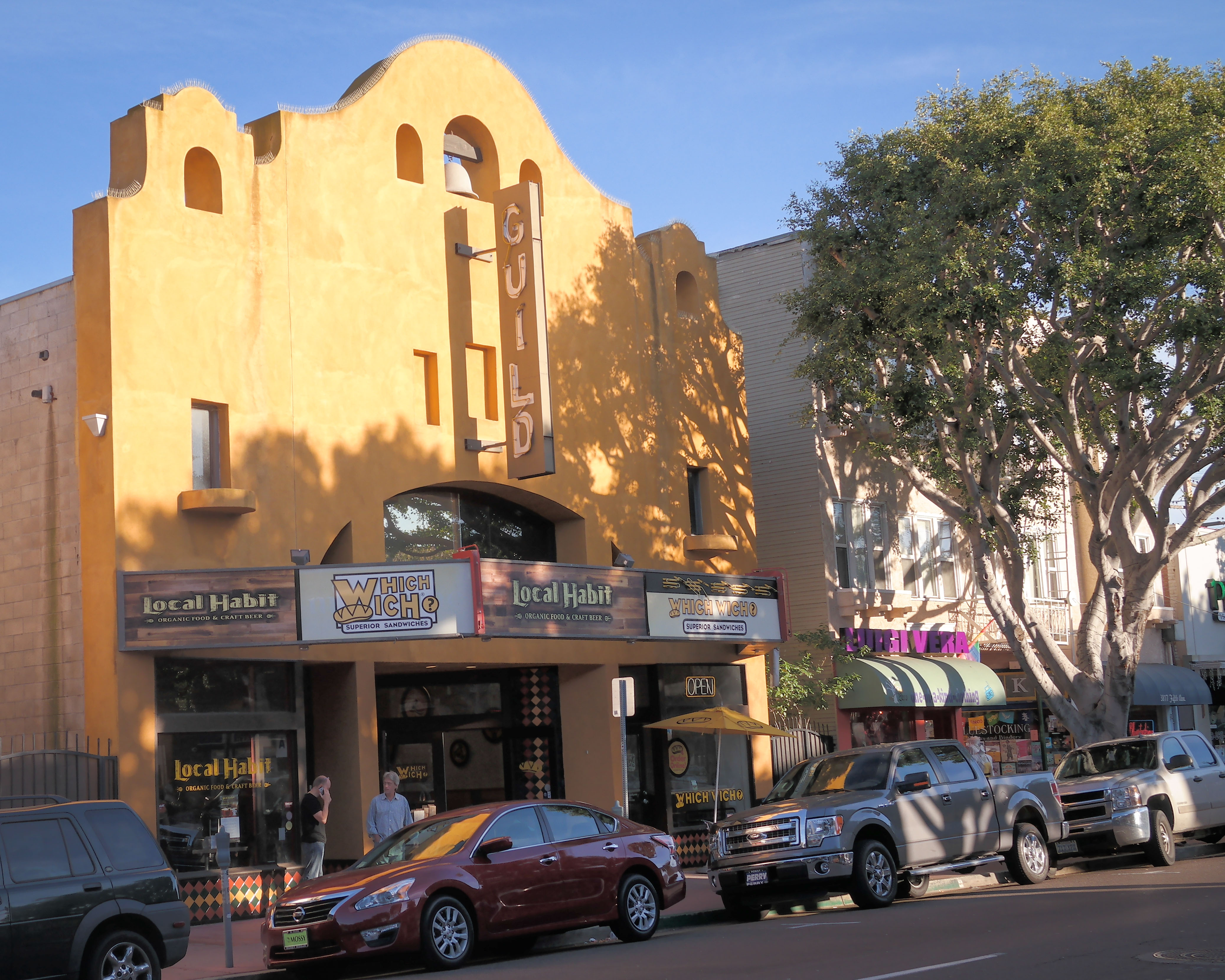
Hillcrest

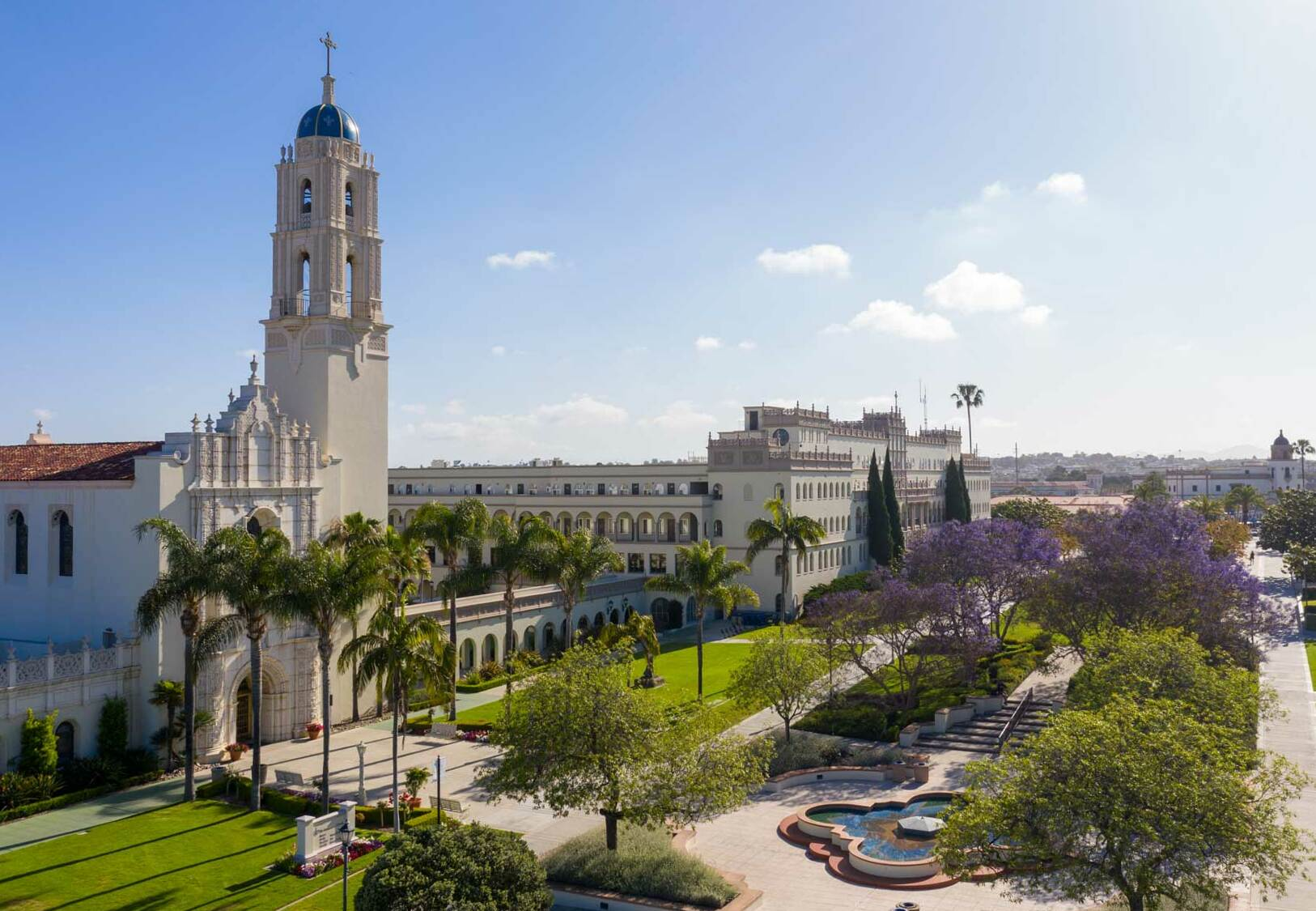
Linda Vista

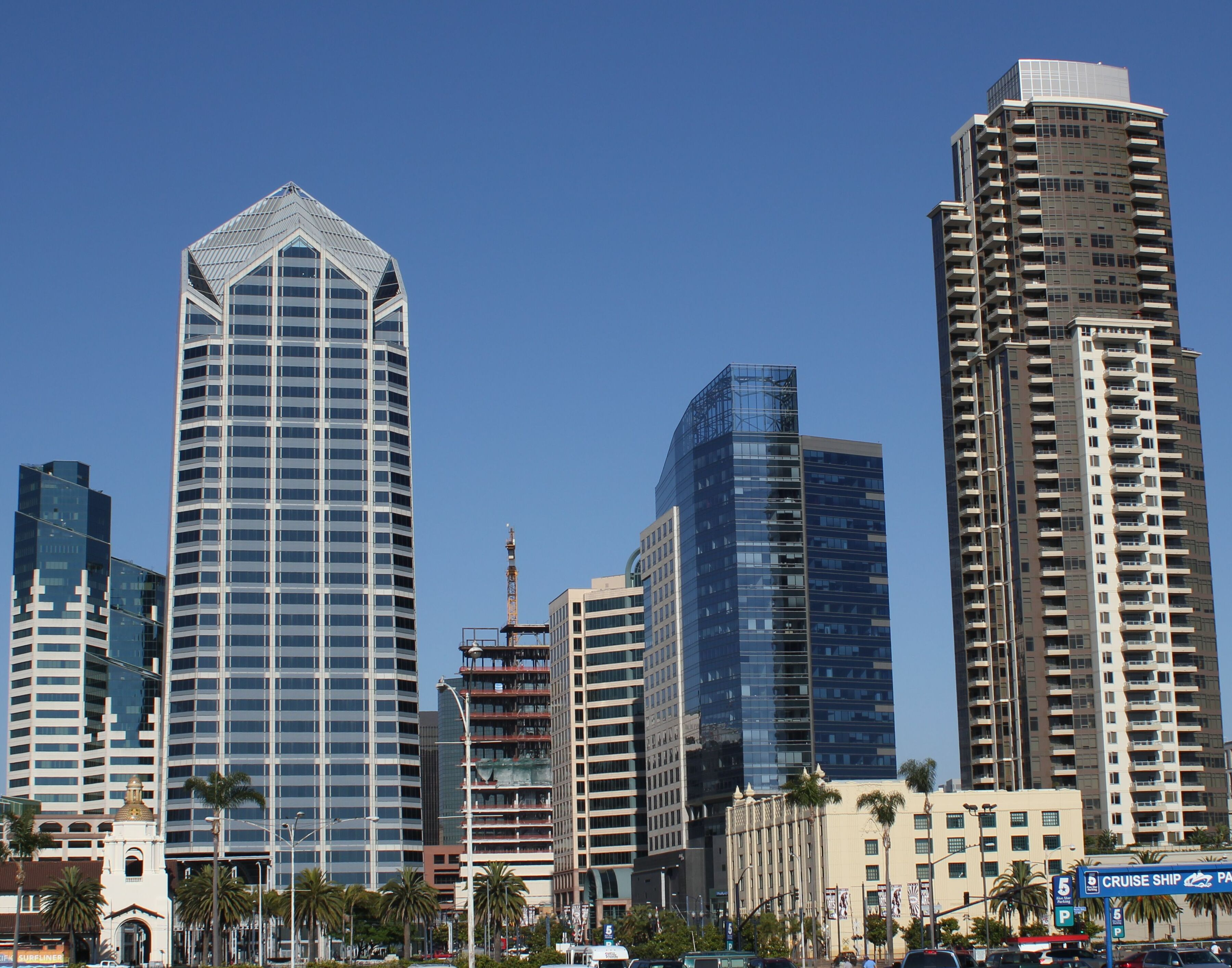
Columbia

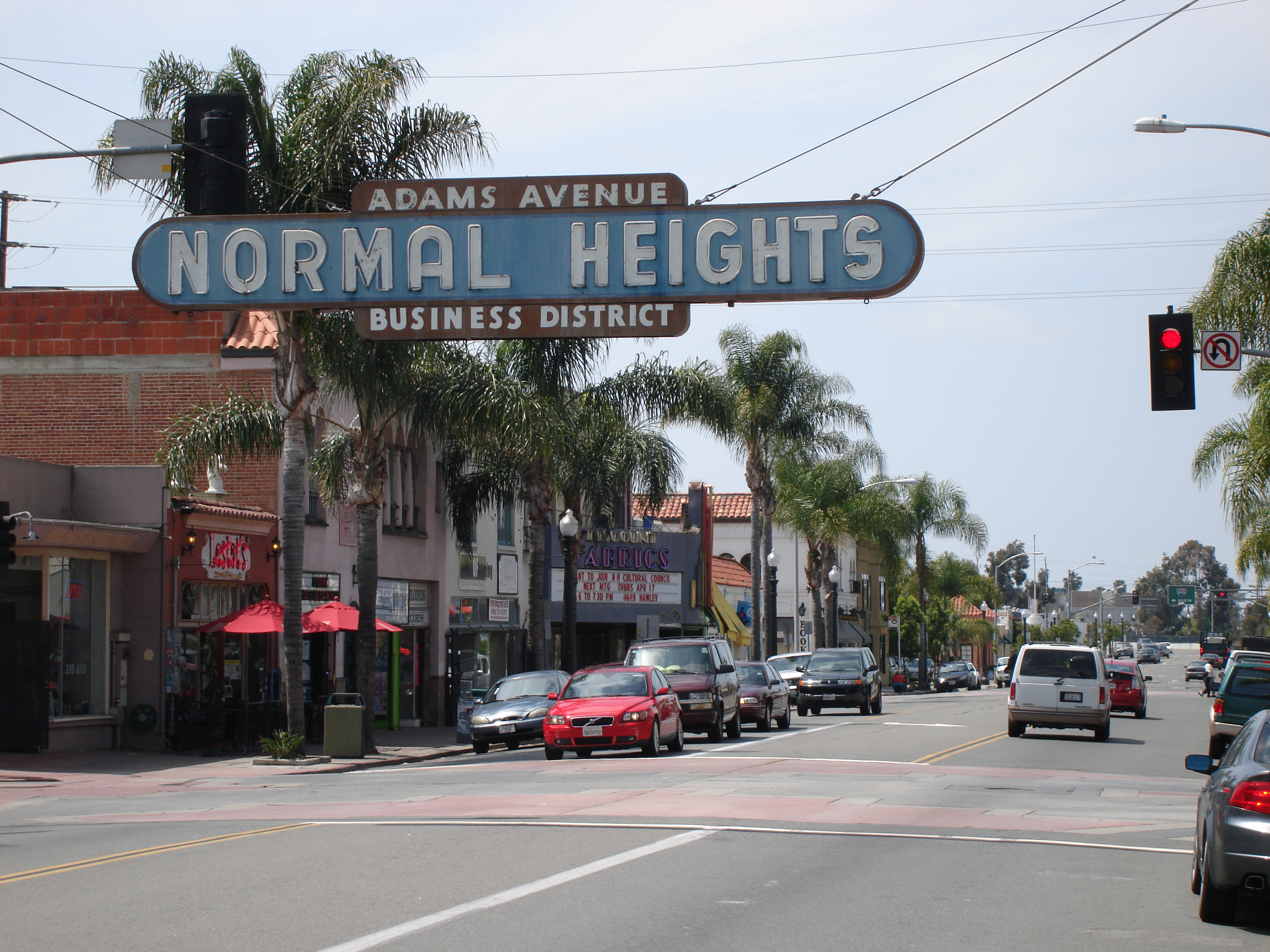
Normal Heights

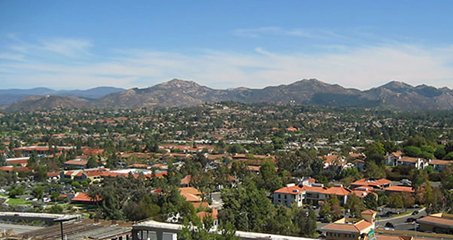
Rancho Bernardo

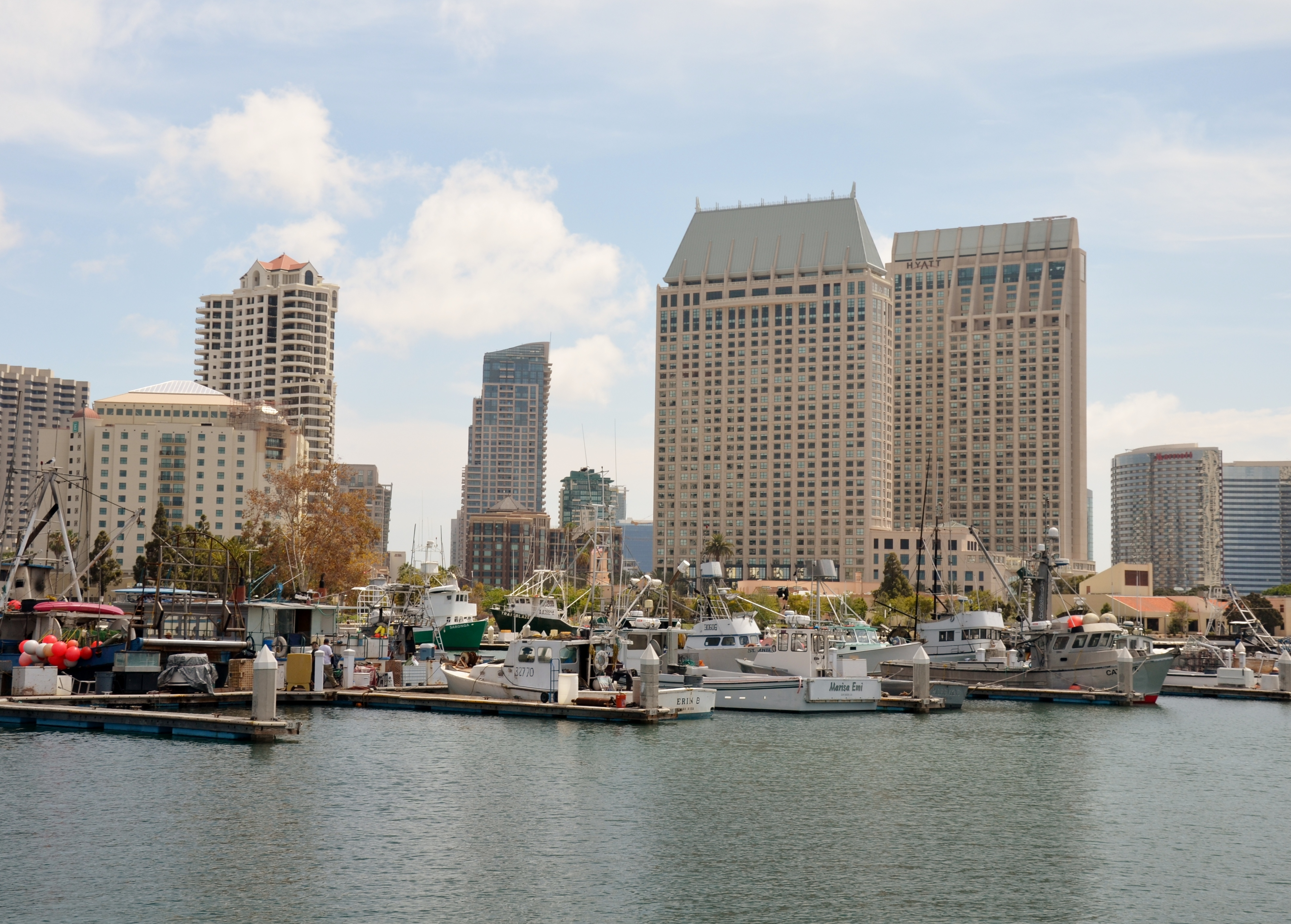
Marina district

For the most part, San Diego neighborhood boundaries tend to be understood by its residents based on geographical boundaries like canyons and street patterns. The city recognized the importance of its neighborhoods when it organized its 2008 General Plan around the concept of a "City of Villages".

=== Cityscape ===
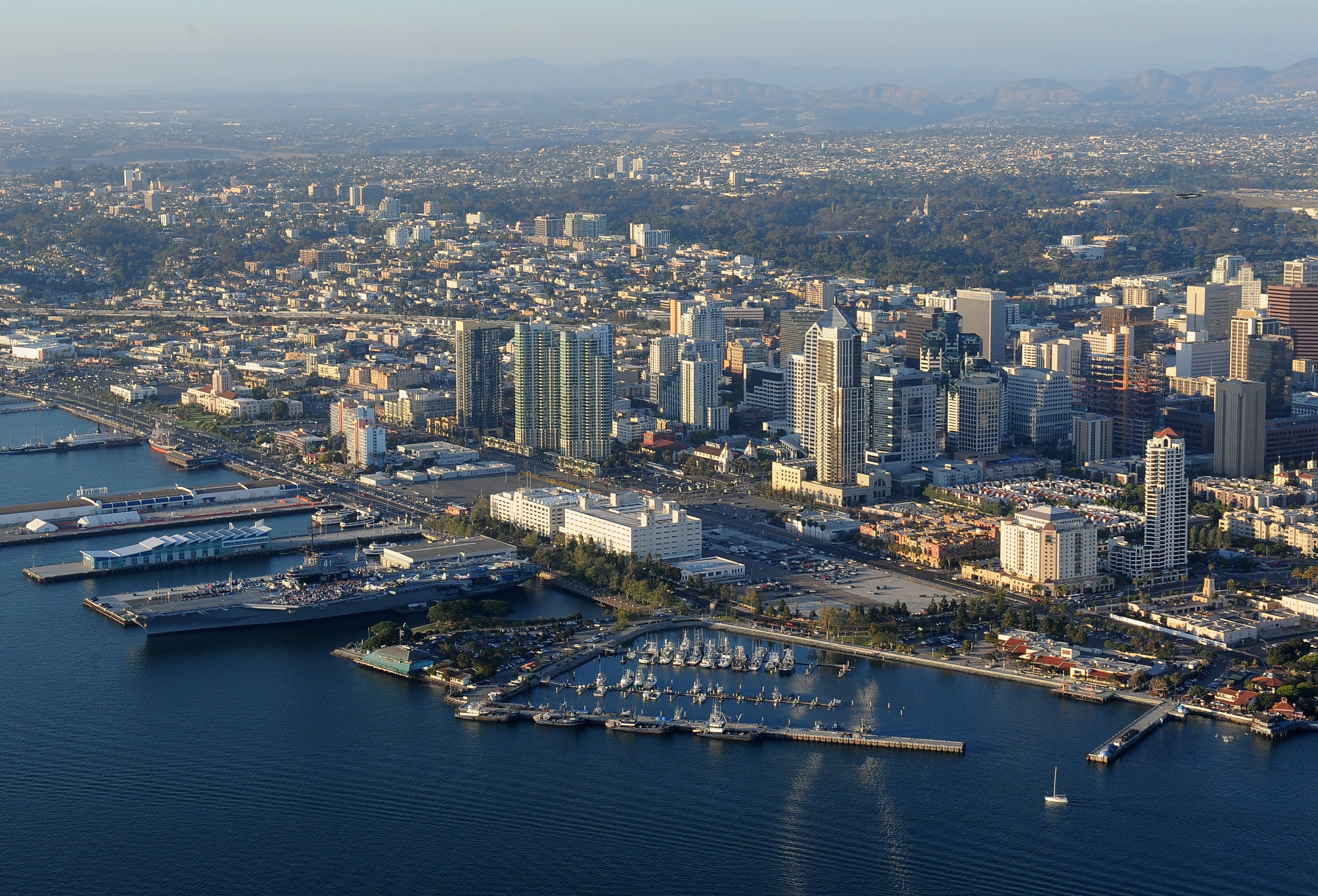
Aerial view of central San Diego

San Diego was originally centered on the Old Town district, but by the late 1860s the focus had shifted to the bayfront, in the belief that this new location would increase trade. As the "New Town" – present-day Downtown – waterfront location quickly developed, it eclipsed Old Town as the center of San Diego.

The first skyscraper over 300 feet (91 m) in San Diego was the El Cortez Hotel, built in 1927; it was the tallest building in the city until 1963. As time went on, multiple buildings claimed the title of San Diego's tallest skyscraper, including the 530 B Street and Symphony Towers. Currently the tallest building in San Diego is One America Plaza, standing 500 feet (150 m) tall, which was completed in 1991. The downtown skyline contains no supertall buildings due to a regulation put in place by the Federal Aviation Administration (FAA) in the 1970s, which set a 500 feet (152 m) limit on the height of buildings within a one-mile (1.6 km) radius of San Diego International Airport. An iconic description of the skyline includes its skyscrapers being compared to the tools of a toolbox.

There are several new high-rises under construction, including two that exceed 400 feet (122 m) in height.

== Demographics ==
Historical population
Census	Pop.	Note	%±
1850	500		—
1860	731		46.2%
1870	2,300		214.6%
1880	2,637		14.7%
1890	16,159		512.8%
1900	17,700		9.5%
1910	39,578		123.6%
1920	74,361		87.9%
1930	147,995		99.0%
1940	203,341		37.4%
1950	334,387		64.4%
1960	573,224		71.4%
1970	696,769		21.6%
1980	875,538		25.7%
1990	1,110,549		26.8%
2000	1,223,400		10.2%
2010	1,307,402		6.9%
2020	1,386,932		6.1%
2025 (est.)	1,406,106	▲	1.4%
Population History of Western; U.S. Cities & Towns, 1850–1990; U.S. Decennial Census; 1860–1870 1880-1890; 1900 1910 1920; 1930 1940 1950; 1960 1970 1980; 1990 2000 2010; 2020

Historical racial composition	2020	2010	1990	1970	1940
White (non-Hispanic)	40.7%	45.1%	58.7%	78.9% (Note: From 15% sample)	87.0%
Hispanic or Latino	29.7%	28.8%	20.7%	10.7%	10.0%
Asian (non-Hispanic)	17.6%	15.9%	11.8%	2.2%	1.0%
Black (non-Hispanic)	6.6%	6.7%	9.4%	7.6%	2.0%

=== 2020 ===
San Diego, California – Racial and ethnic composition Note: the US Census treats Hispanic/Latino as an ethnic category. This table excludes Latinos from the racial categories and assigns them to a separate category. Hispanics/Latinos may be of any race.
Race / Ethnicity (NH = Non-Hispanic)	Pop 2000	Pop 2010	Pop 2020	% 2000	% 2010	% 2020
White alone (NH)	603,892	589,702	565,128	49.36%	45.10%	40.75%
Black or African American alone (NH)	92,830	82,497	77,542	7.59%	6.31%	5.59%
Native American or Alaska Native alone (NH)	4,267	3,545	3,200	0.35%	0.27%	0.23%
Asian alone (NH)	164,895	204,347	243,428	13.48%	15.63%	17.55%
Native Hawaiian or Pacific Islander alone (NH)	5,311	5,178	4,887	0.43%	0.40%	0.35%
Other race alone (NH)	3,065	3,293	8,208	0.25%	0.25%	0.59%
Mixed race or Multiracial (NH)	38,388	42,820	73,243	3.14%	3.28%	5.28%
Hispanic or Latino (any race)	310,752	376,020	411,286	25.40%	28.76%	29.65%
Total	1,223,400	1,307,402	1,386,932	100.00%	100.00%	100.00%

=== 2010 ===
The city had a population of 1,307,402 according to the 2010 census, distributed over a land area of 372.1 square miles (963.7 km^{2}). The urban area of San Diego had a total population of 2,956,746, making it the third-largest in the state, after those of Los Angeles and San Francisco.

The 2010 population represented an increase of just under 7% from the 1,223,400 people reported in 2000. The population density was 3,771.9 inhabitants per square mile (1,456.3/km^{2}). The racial makeup of San Diego was 58.9% White, 6.7% Black, 0.6% Native American, 15.9% Asian (5.9% Filipino, 2.7% Chinese, 2.5% Vietnamese, 1.3% Indian, 1.0% Korean, 0.7% Japanese, 0.4% Laotian, 0.3% Cambodian, 0.1% Thai). 0.5% Pacific Islander (0.2% Guamanian, 0.1% Samoan, 0.1% Native Hawaiian), 12.3% from other races, and 5.1% from two or more races. 28.8% of the population was Hispanic or Latino (of any race); 24.9% of the total population was of Mexican heritage, 1.4% Spanish and 0.6% Puerto Rican. The median age of Hispanic residents was 27.5 years, compared to 35.1 years overall and 41.6 years among non-Hispanic whites; Hispanic San Diegans were the largest group under the age of 18, while non-Hispanic whites constituted 63.1% of population 55 and older.

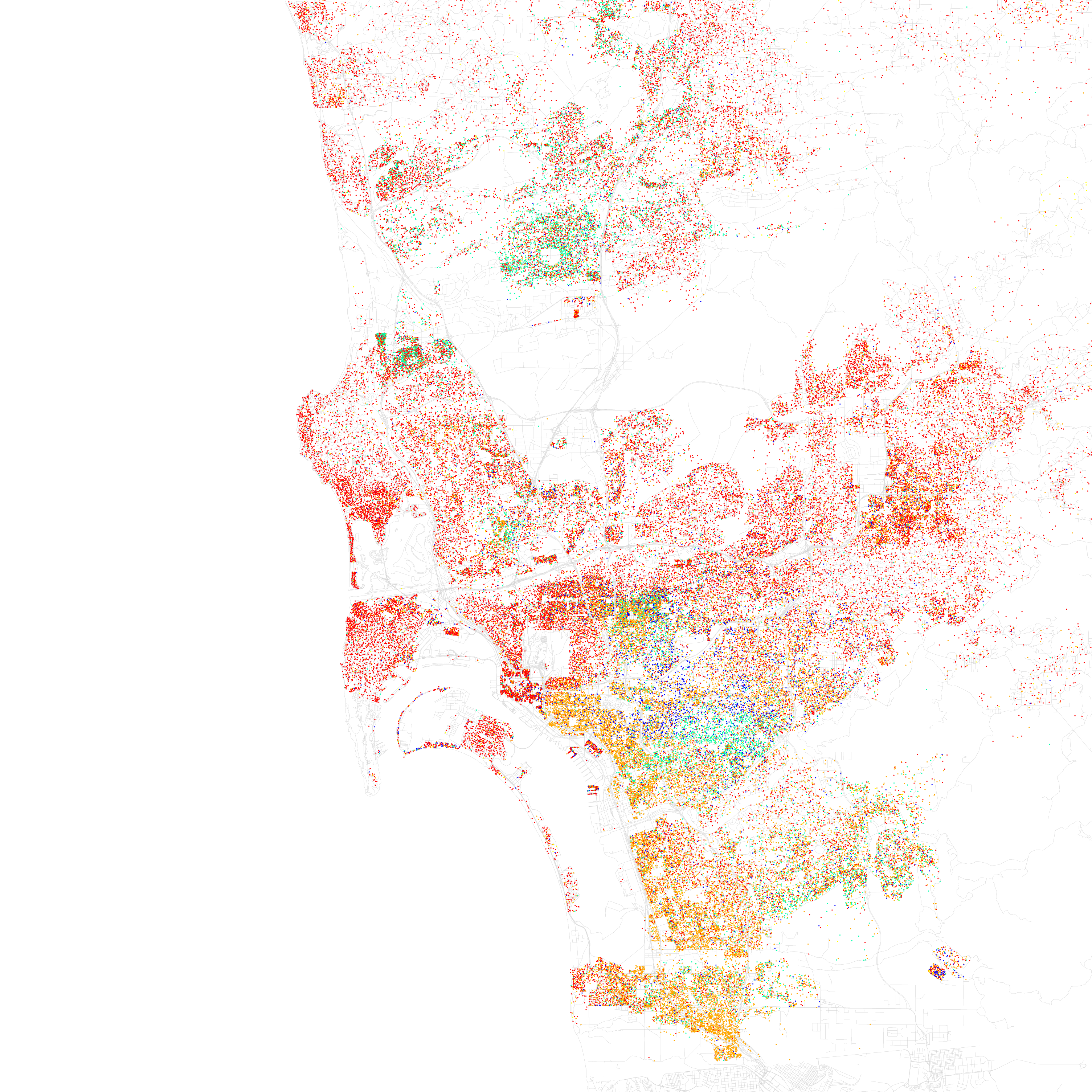
Map of racial distribution in San Diego, 2010 U.S. Census. Each dot is 25 people: ⬤ Non-Hispanic White ⬤ Black ⬤ Asian ⬤ Hispanic ⬤ Other

As of January 2019, the San Diego City and County had the fifth-largest homeless population among major cities in the United States, with 8,102 people experiencing homelessness. In the city of San Diego, 4,887 individuals were experiencing homelessness according to the 2020 count. A December 11, 2023, article in The San Diego Union-Tribune by Blake Nelson reports a notable decline in the homeless population in downtown San Diego, specifically in the urban core. According to data from the Downtown San Diego Partnership, the number of individuals living outside or in vehicles has reached a two-year low, standing at approximately 1,200 as of last month. The decrease is attributed to the implementation of the city's camping ban and the concerted efforts to establish new shelters. While enforcement has led to relatively few individuals being punished, the threat of legal consequences appears to have played a role in the reduction.

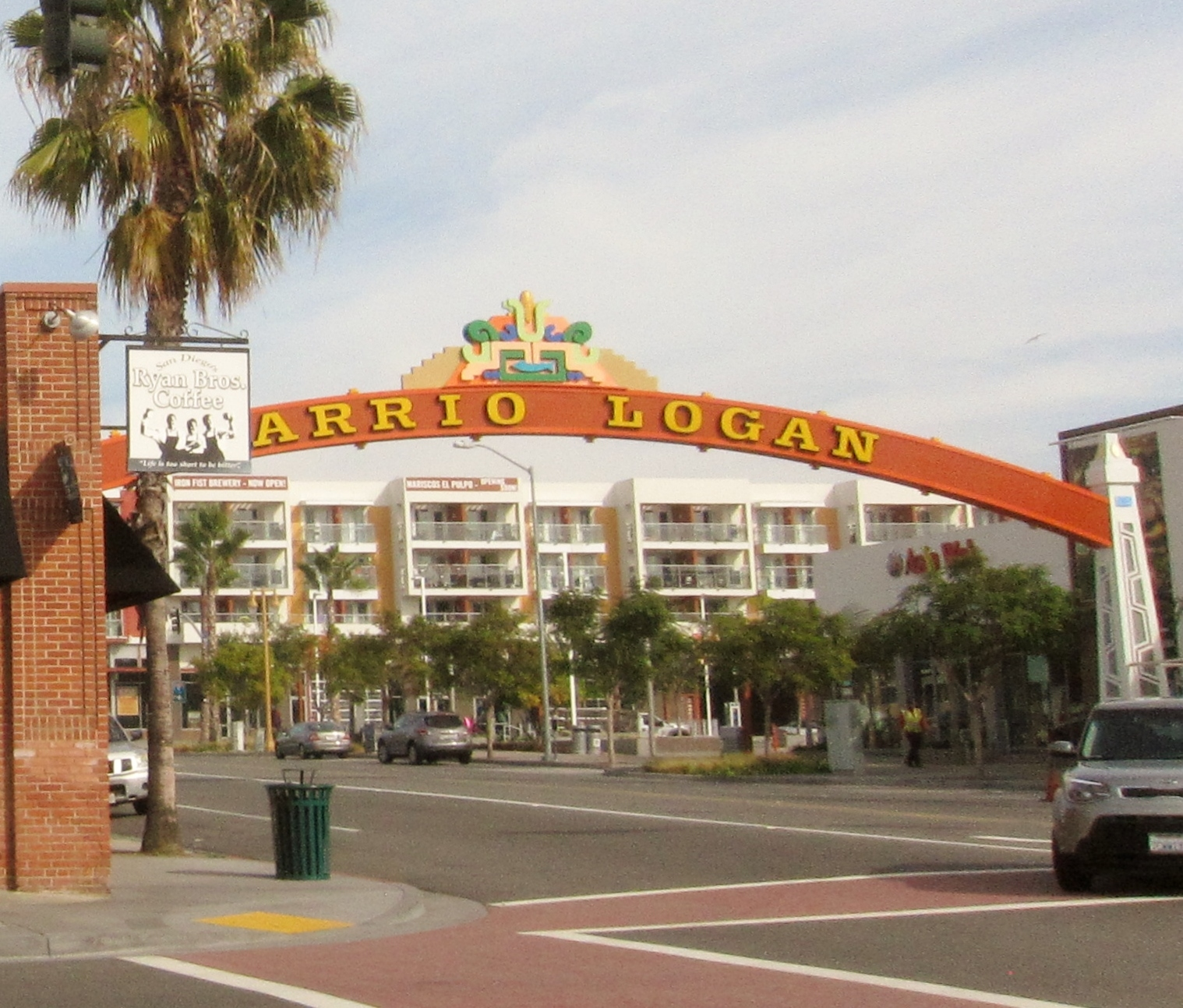
Barrio Logan is a Chicano cultural hub and ethnic enclave.

In 2000 there were 451,126 households, out of which 30.2% had children under the age of 18 living with them, 44.6% were married couples living together, 11.4% had a female householder with no husband present, and 39.8% were non-families. Households made up of individuals account for 28.0%, and 7.4% had someone living alone who was 65 years of age or older. The average household size was 2.61, and the average family size was 3.30.

The U.S. Census Bureau reported that in 2000, 24.0% of San Diego residents were under 18, and 10.5% were 65 and over. As of 2011 the median age was 35.6; more than a quarter of residents were under age 20 and 11% were over age 65. Millennials (ages 26 through 42) constitute 27.1% of San Diego's population, the second-highest percentage in a major U.S. city. The San Diego County regional planning agency, SANDAG, provides tables and graphs breaking down the city population into five-year age groups.

In 2000, the median income for a household in the city was $45,733, and the median income for a family was $53,060. Males had a median income of $36,984 versus $31,076 for females. The per capita income for the city was $35,199. According to Forbes in 2005, San Diego was the fifth wealthiest U.S. city, but about 10.6% of families and 14.6% of the population were below the poverty line, including 20.0% of those under age 18 and 7.6% of those age 65 or over. As of January 1, 2008, estimates by the San Diego Association of Governments revealed that the household median income for San Diego rose to $66,715, up from $45,733 in 2000.

San Diego was named the ninth-most LGBT-friendly city in the U.S. in 2013. The city also has the seventh-highest population of gay residents in the U.S. Additionally in 2013, San Diego State University (SDSU), one of the city's prominent universities, was named one of the top LGBT-friendly campuses in the nation.

=== Religion ===
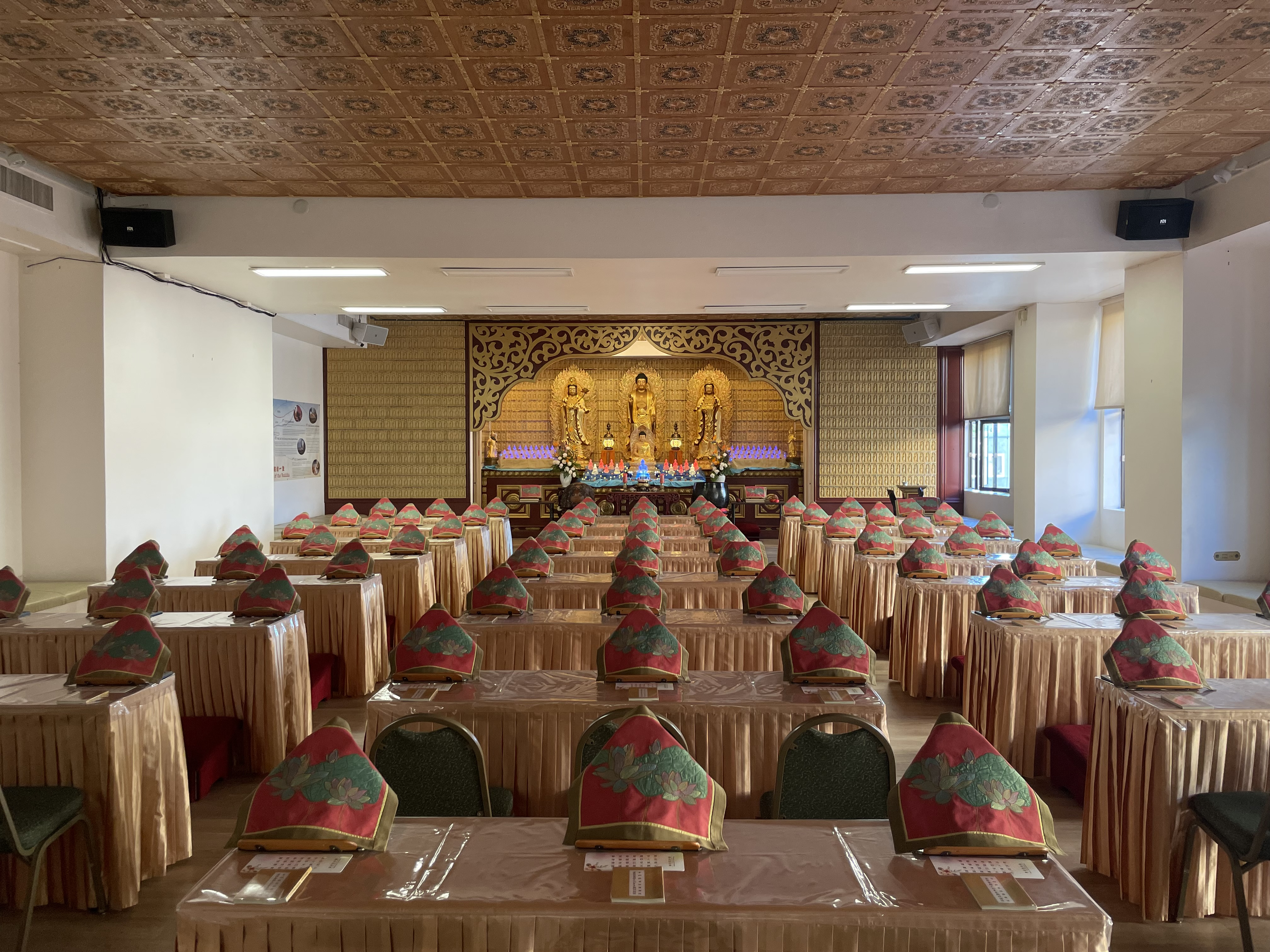
Hsi Fang Buddhist temple in University Heights.

According to a 2023-24 study by the Pew Research Center, 53 percent of the city identified themselves as Christians. Among Christians, 25% professed adherence to various Protestant churches, 21% professed Roman Catholic beliefs, and 3% identified as Latter-day Saint (Mormon) In the same study, 40% of San Diegans claimed no religious affiliation. The same study found that followers of other religions (including Islam, Judaism, Hinduism, and Buddhism) collectively made up about 6% of the population.

=== Foreign-born population ===
The majority of San Diego's foreign-born population were born in Mexico, the Philippines, China and Vietnam.

== Economy ==
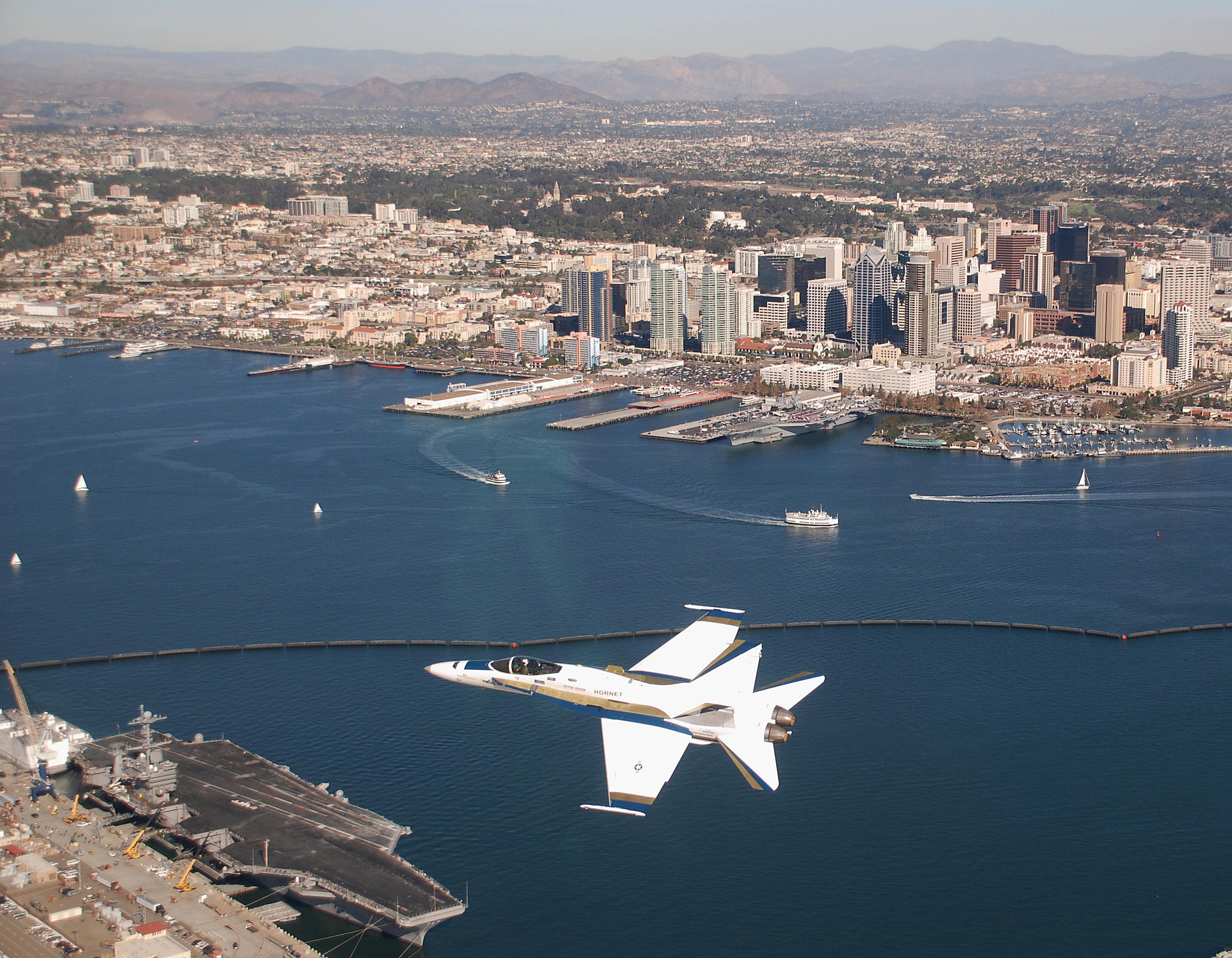
An F/A-18 Hornet flying over San Diego. The city serves as a major hub for the defense industry and U.S. military.

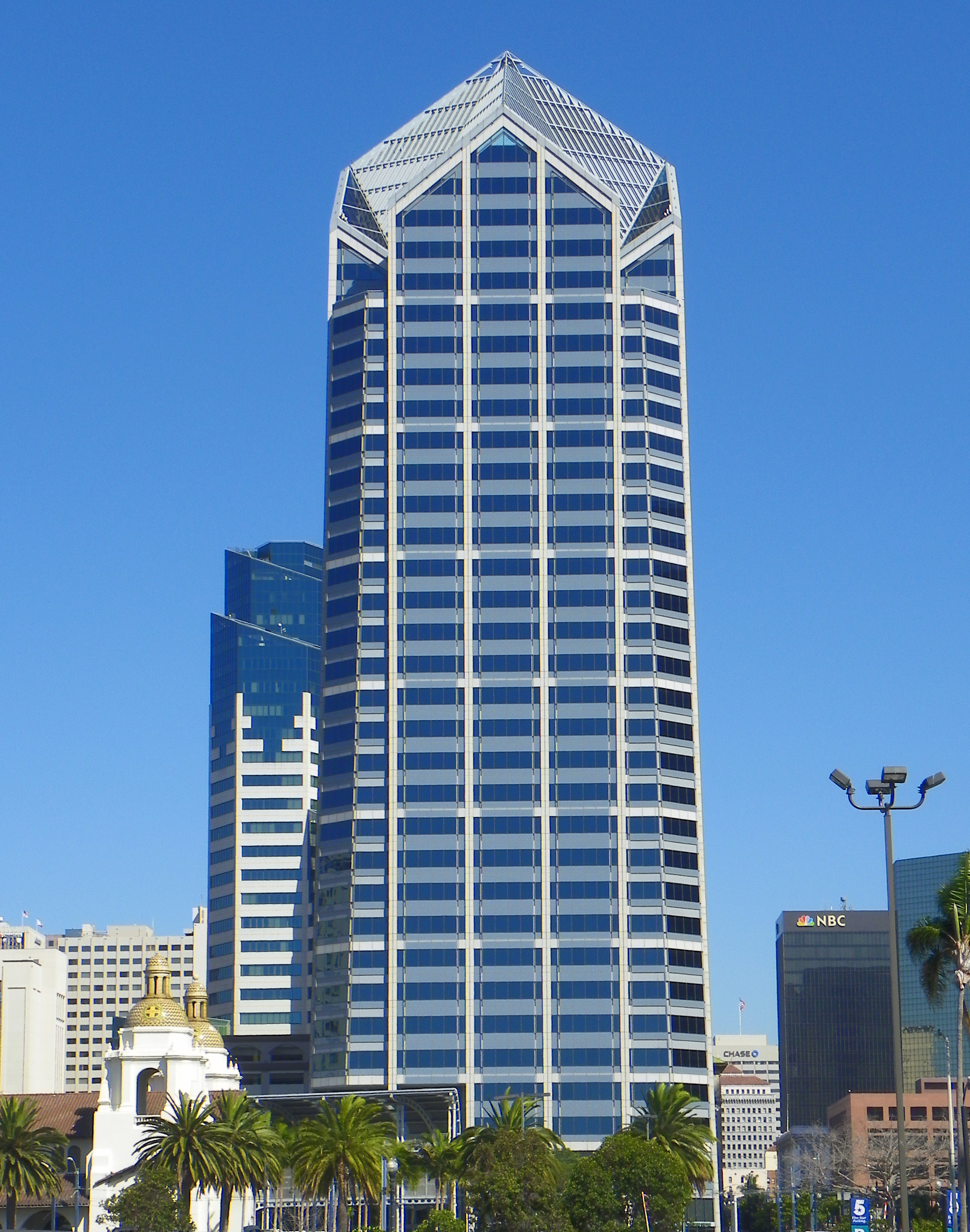
One America Plaza is the tallest building in San Diego.

The largest sectors of San Diego's economy are defense/military, tourism, international trade, and research/manufacturing. San Diego recorded a median household income of $79,646 in 2018, an increase of 3.89% from $76,662 in 2017. The median property value in San Diego in 2018 was $654,700, and the average home has two cars per household.

=== Top employers ===
According to the city's 2025 Annual Comprehensive Financial Report, the top employers in the city are:

Employer	No. of Employees
Naval Base San Diego	38,852
University of California, San Diego	32,465
Sharp HealthCare	20,105
County of San Diego	18,197
Scripps Health	13,572
San Diego Unified School District	12,794
City of San Diego	13,078
Qualcomm	10,073
Kaiser Permanente	8,566
Rady Children's Hospital	6,539

=== Defense and military ===
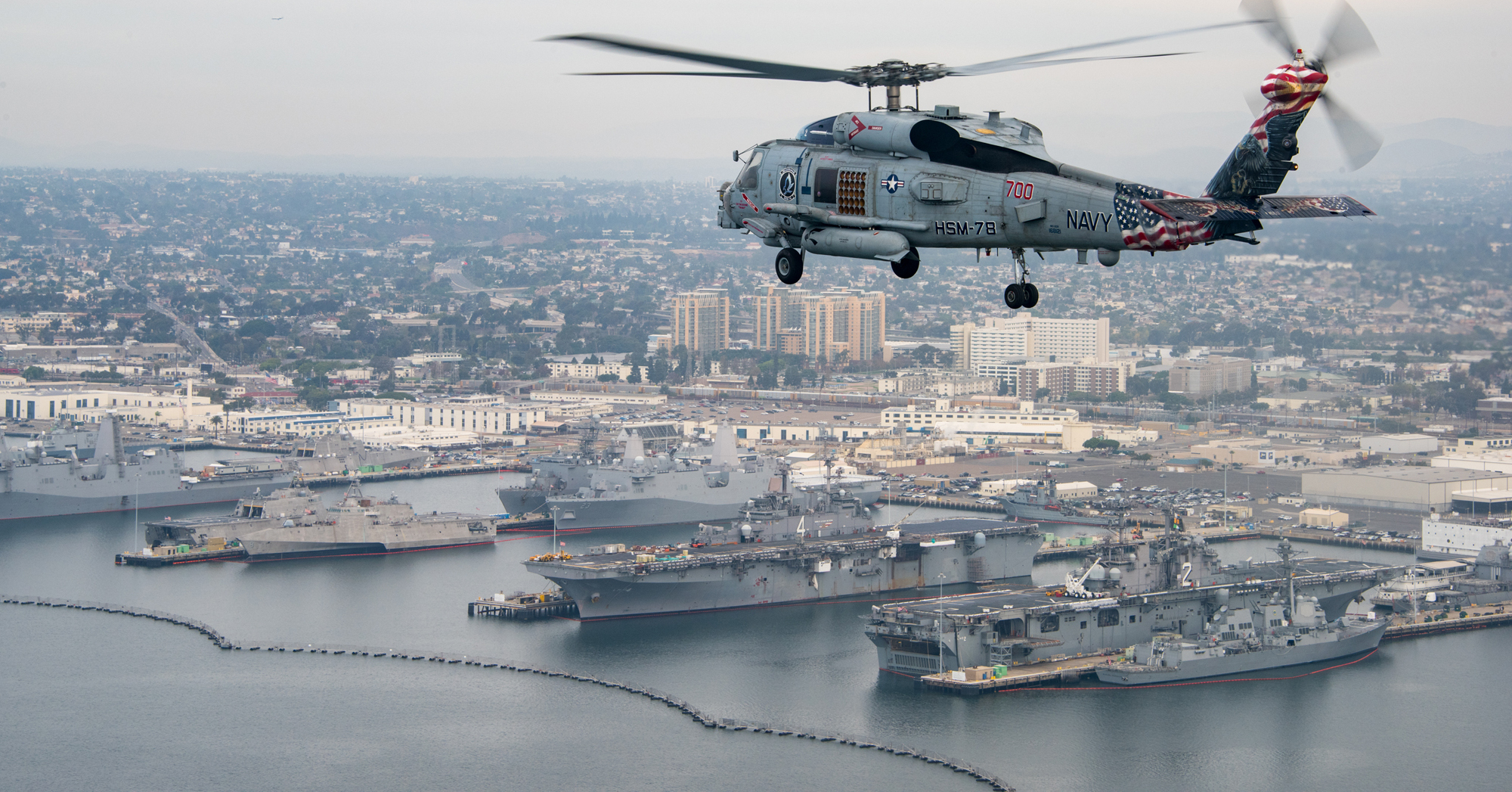
View of Naval Base San Diego

The economy of San Diego is influenced by its deepwater port, which includes the only major submarine and shipbuilding yards on the West Coast. Several major national defense contractors were started and are headquartered in San Diego, including General Atomics, Cubic, and NASSCO.

San Diego hosts the largest naval fleet in the world: In 2008 it was home to 53 ships, over 120 tenant commands, and more than 35,000 sailors, marines, Department of Defense civilian employees and contractors. About 5 percent of all civilian jobs in the county are military-related, and 15,000 businesses in San Diego County rely on Department of Defense contracts.

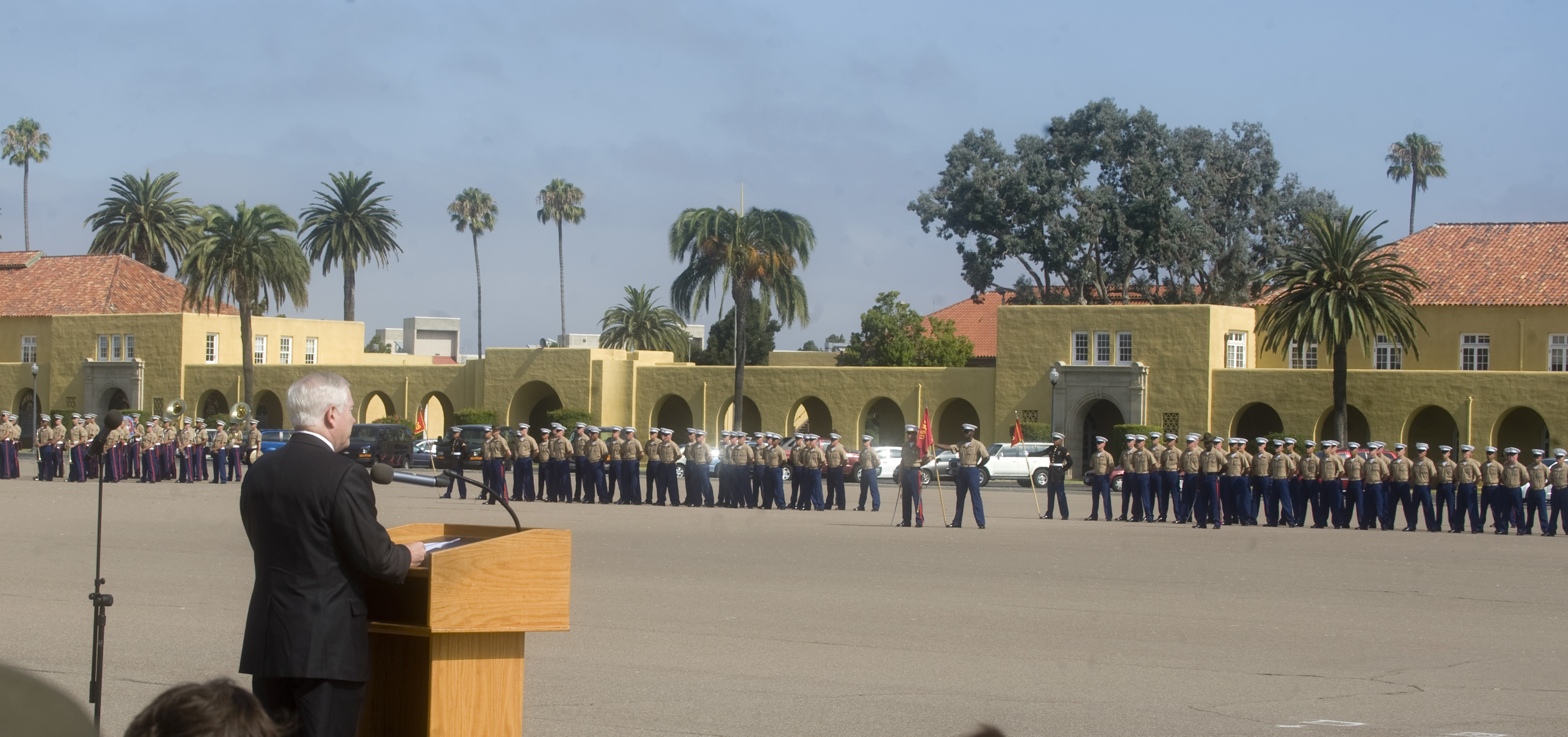
Marine Corps Recruit Depot

Military bases in San Diego include US Navy facilities, Marine Corps bases, and Coast Guard stations. The city is "home to the majority of the U.S. Pacific Fleet's surface combatants, all of the Navy's West Coast amphibious ships and a variety of Coast Guard and Military Sealift Command vessels".

The military infrastructure in San Diego is still growing and developing, with numerous military personnel stationed there, numbers of which are expected to rise. This plays a significant role in the city's economy, as of 2020, it provides roughly 25% of the GDP and provides 23% of the total jobs in San Diego.

=== Tourism ===
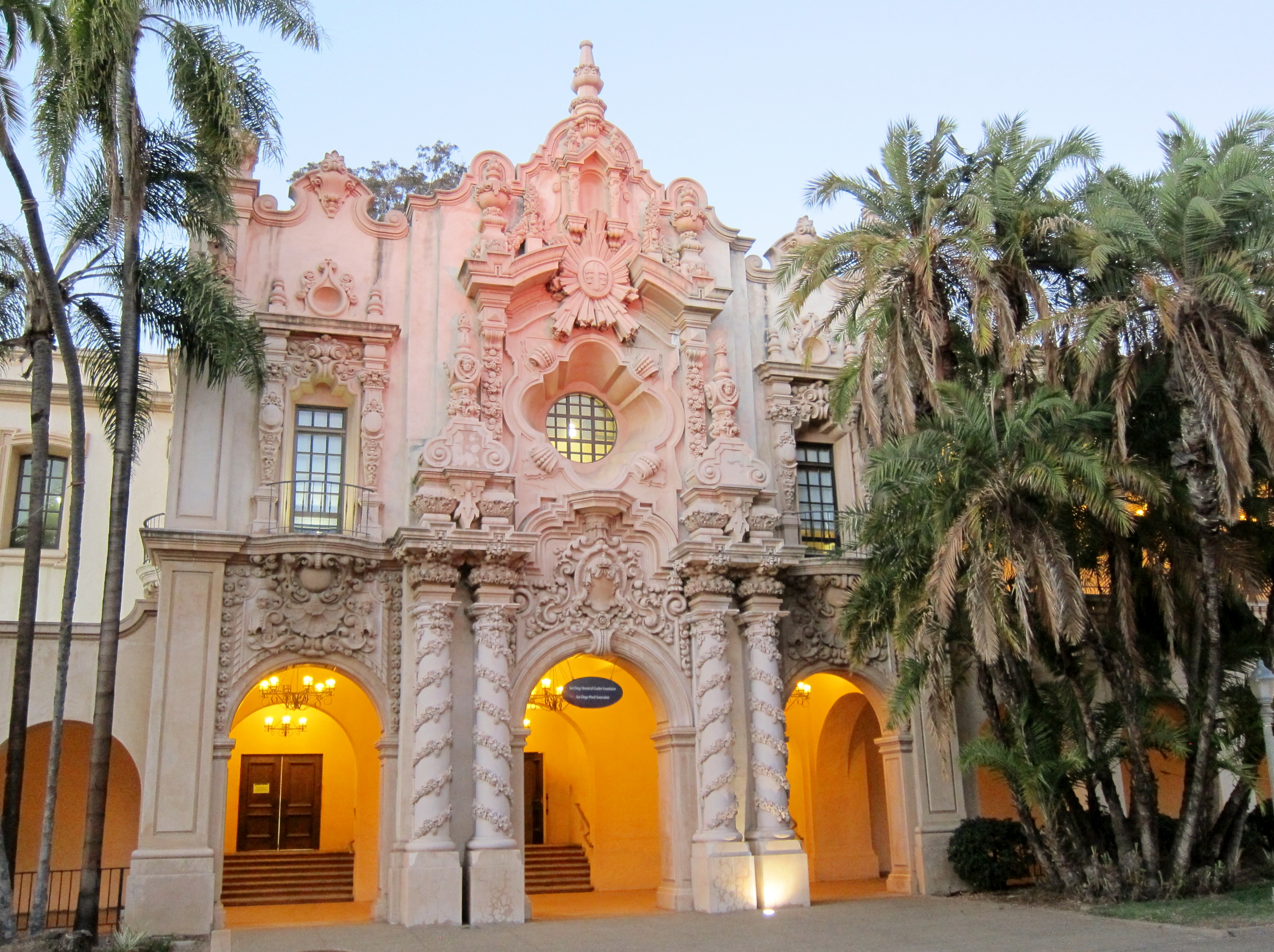
Casa de Balboa at Balboa Park is home to the San Diego History Center.

Tourism is a major industry owing to the city's climate, beaches, and tourist attractions such as Balboa Park, Belmont Park, San Diego Zoo, San Diego Zoo Safari Park, and SeaWorld San Diego. San Diego's Spanish and Mexican heritage is reflected in many historic sites across the city, such as Mission San Diego de Alcalá and Old Town San Diego State Historic Park. Also, the local craft brewing industry attracts an increasing number of visitors for "beer tours" and the annual San Diego Beer Week in November; San Diego has been called "America's Craft Beer Capital".

San Diego County hosted more than 32 million visitors in 2012; collectively they spent an estimated $8 billion. The visitor industry provides employment for more than 160,000 people.

San Diego's cruise ship industry used to be the second-largest in California. Numerous cruise lines operate out of San Diego. However, cruise ship business has been in decline since 2008, when the Port hosted over 250 ship calls and more than 900,000 passengers. By 2016–2017, the number of ship calls had fallen to 90.

Local sightseeing cruises are offered in San Diego Bay and Mission Bay, as well as whale-watching cruises to observe the migration of gray whales, peaking in mid-January. Sport fishing is another popular tourist attraction; San Diego is home to southern California's biggest sport fishing fleet.

=== International trade ===
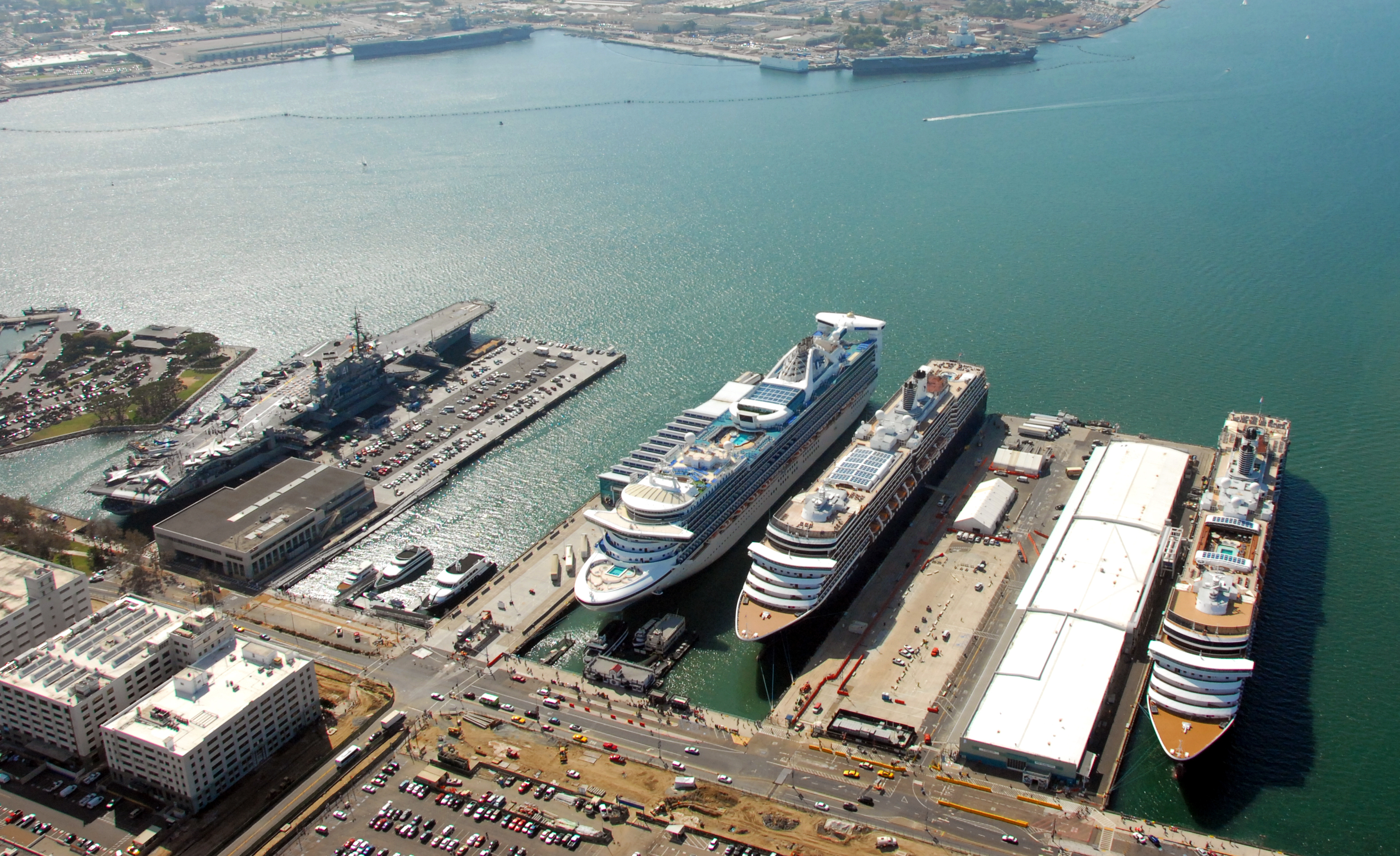
The Port of San Diego is the third-busiest port in California.

San Diego's commercial port and its location on the United States–Mexico border make international trade an important factor in the city's economy. The city is authorized by the United States government to operate as a foreign-trade zone.

The city shares a 15-mile (24 km) border with Mexico that includes two border crossings. San Diego hosts the busiest international land border crossing outside of Asia in the San Ysidro neighborhood at the San Ysidro Port of Entry. A second, primarily commercial border crossing operates in the Otay Mesa area; it is the largest commercial crossing on the California–Baja California border and handles the third-highest volume of trucks and dollar value of trade among all United States-Mexico land crossings.

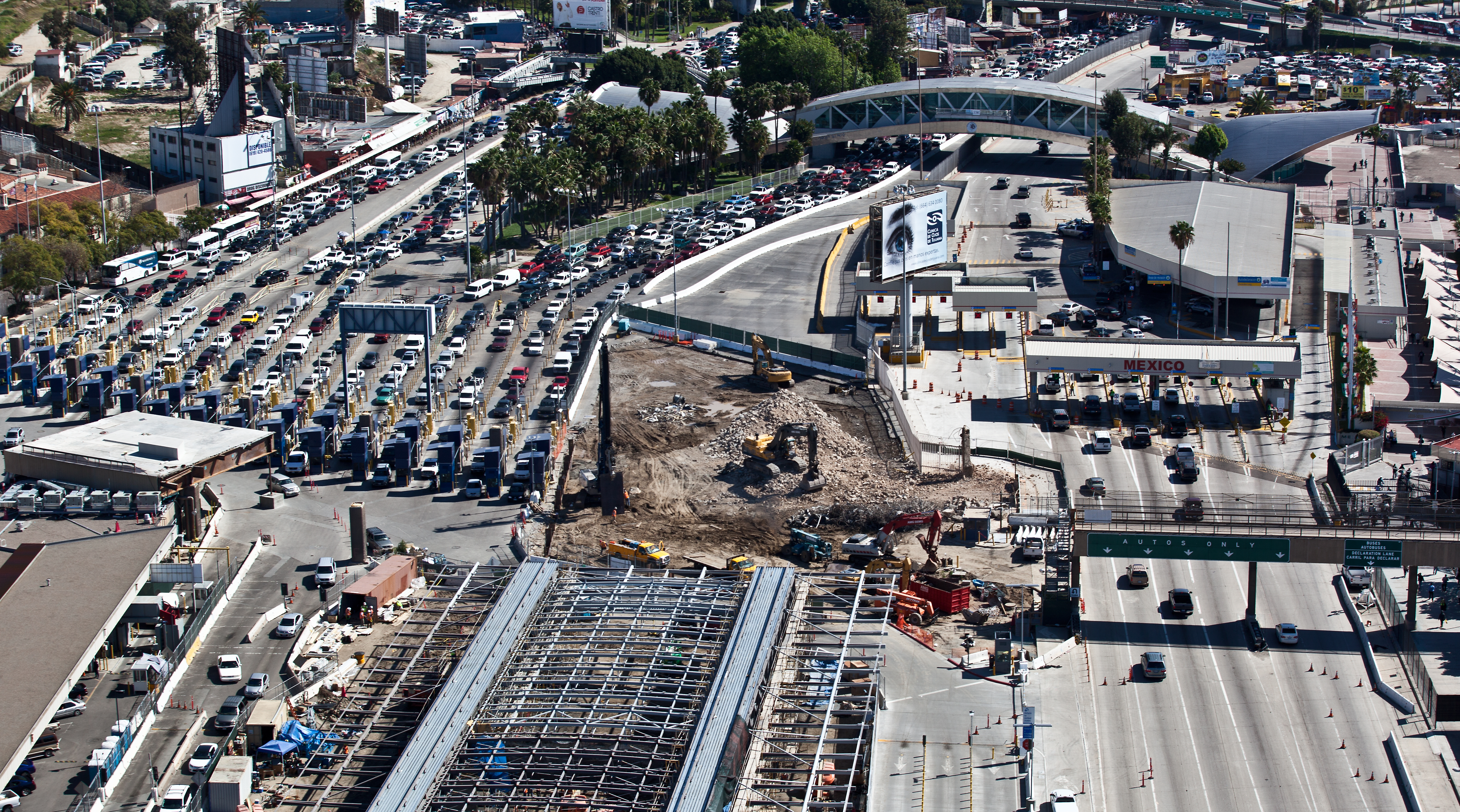
San Ysidro Port of Entry is the 4th-busiest border crossing in the world and the busiest in the Western Hemisphere.

The Port of San Diego is the third-busiest port in California and one of the busiest on the West Coast. One of the Port of San Diego's two cargo facilities is located in downtown San Diego at the Tenth Avenue Marine Terminal. This terminal has facilities for containers, bulk cargo, and refrigerated and frozen storage, so that it can handle the import and export of many commodities. In 2009 the Port of San Diego handled 1,137,054 short tons of total trade; foreign trade accounted for 956,637 short tons while domestic trade amounted to 180,417 short tons.

Historically tuna fishing and canning was one of San Diego's major industries, although the American tuna fishing fleet is no longer based in San Diego. Seafood company Bumble Bee Foods is headquartered in San Diego, as was Chicken of the Sea until 2018.

=== Companies ===
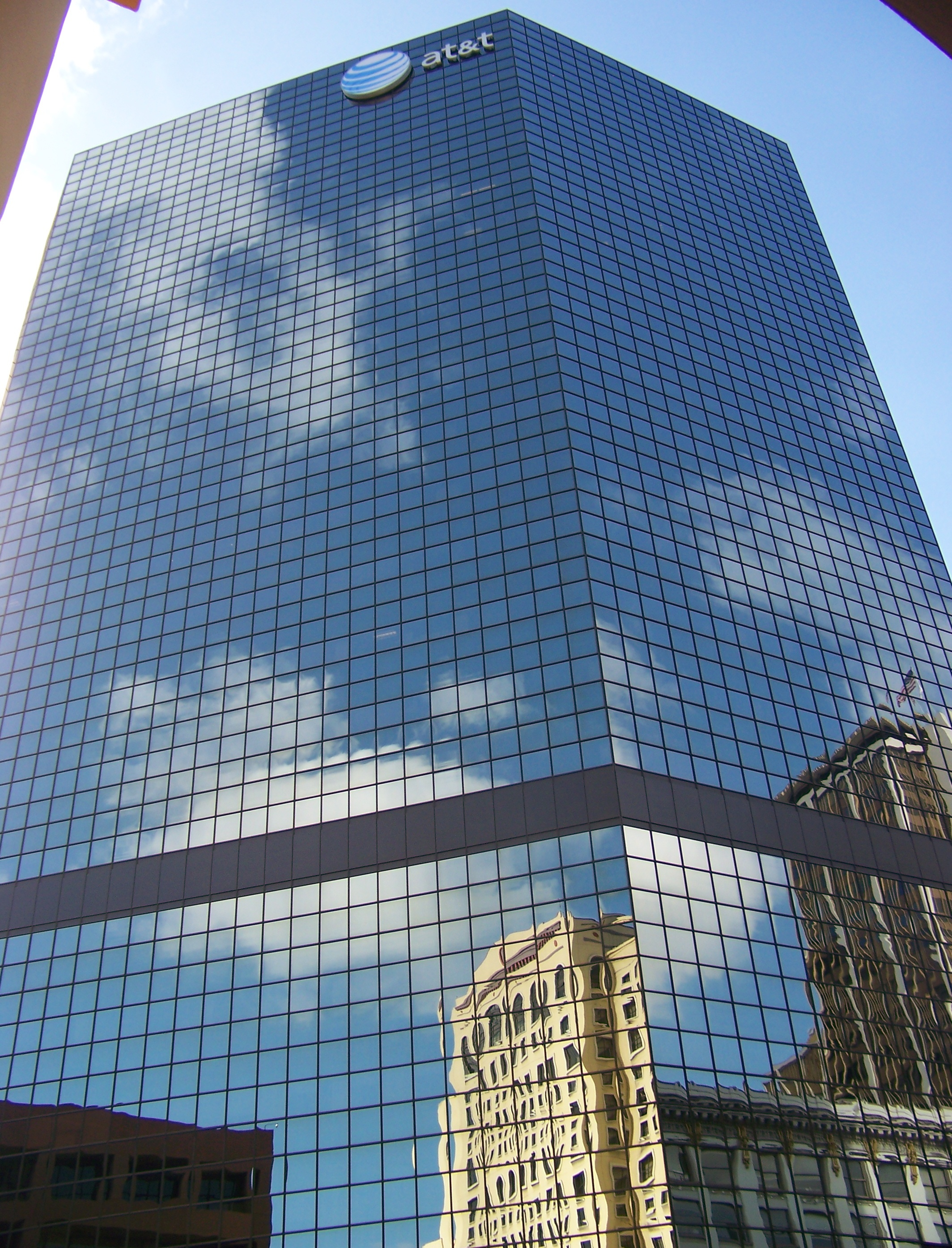
The AT&T Building

San Diego hosts several major producers of wireless cellular technology. Qualcomm was founded and is headquartered in San Diego, and is one of the largest private-sector employers in San Diego. Other wireless industry manufacturers with U.S. headquarters here include Nokia, LG Electronics, Kyocera International, Cricket Communications and Novatel Wireless. San Diego also has the U.S. headquarters for the Slovak security company ESET. San Diego has been designated as an iHub Innovation Center for potential collaboration between wireless and the life sciences.

The University of California, San Diego and other research institutions have helped to fuel the growth of biotechnology. In 2013, San Diego had the second-largest biotech cluster in the United States, below Greater Boston and above the San Francisco Bay Area. There are more than 400 biotechnology companies in the area. In particular, the La Jolla and nearby Sorrento Valley areas are home to offices and research facilities for numerous biotechnology companies. Major biotechnology companies like Illumina and Neurocrine Biosciences are headquartered in San Diego, while many other biotech and pharmaceutical companies have offices or research facilities in San Diego. San Diego is also home to more than 140 contract research organizations (CROs) that provide contract services for pharmaceutical and biotechnology companies.

=== Real estate ===
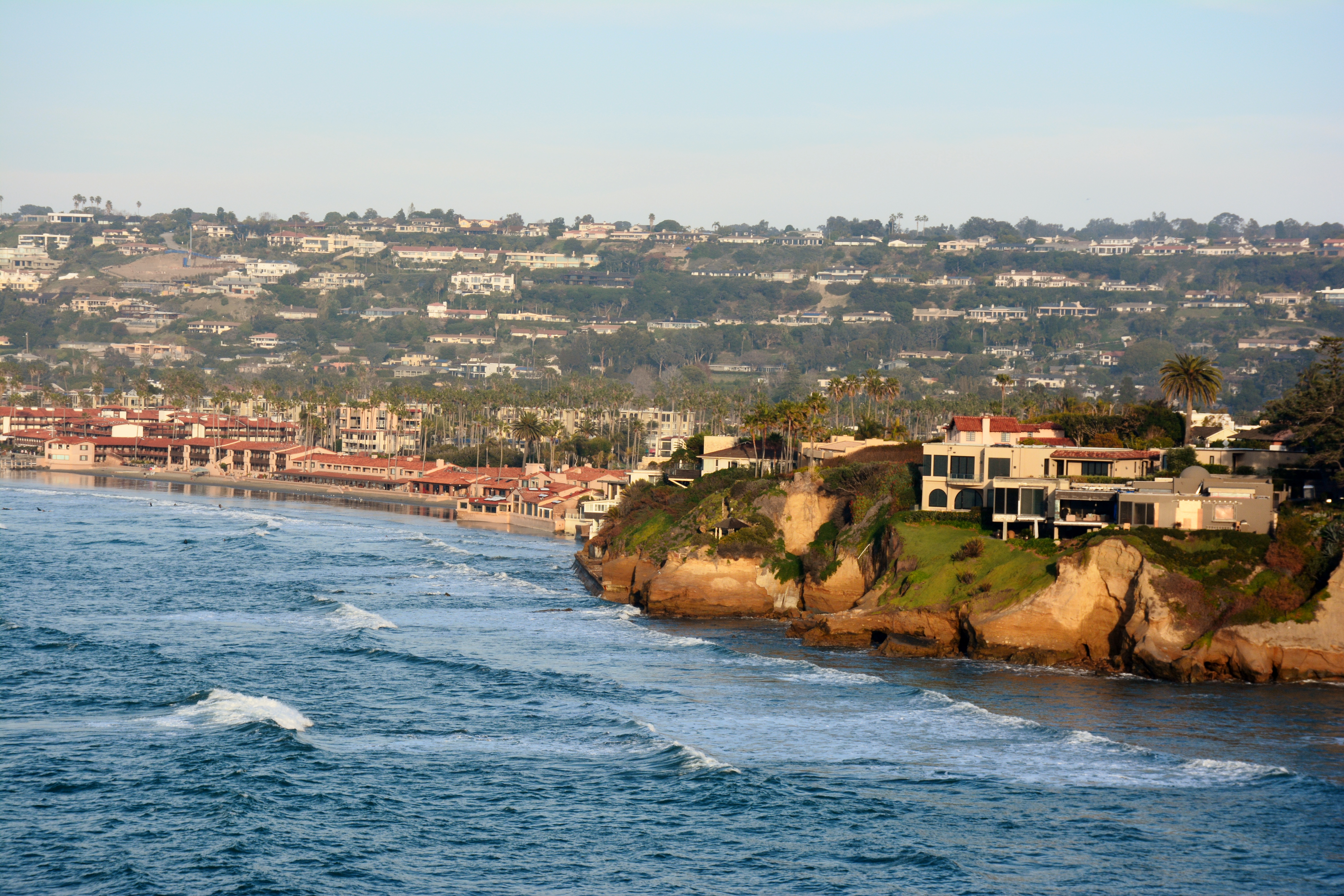
La Jolla is a highly valued real estate market in San Diego.

San Diego has high real estate prices. San Diego home prices peaked in 2005, and then declined along with the national trend. As of December 2010, prices were down 36 percent from the peak, median price of homes having declined by more than $200,000 between 2005 and 2010. As of May 2015, the median price of a house was $520,000. In November 2018 the median home price was $558,000. The San Diego metropolitan area had one of the worst housing affordability rankings of all metropolitan areas in the United States in 2009. The San Diego Housing Market experienced a decline in the median sold price of existing single-family homes between December 2022 and January 2023, with a 2.9% decrease from $850,000 to $824,950. As of 2023, the majority of homes (nearly 60%) in San Diego are listed above $1 million, with the city's median home price at $910,000, ranking it fourth highest among the 30 largest U.S. cities.

Consequently, San Diego has experienced negative net migration since 2004. A significant number of people have moved to adjacent Riverside County, commuting daily to jobs in San Diego, while others are leaving the area altogether and moving to more affordable regions.

== Government ==
=== Local government ===
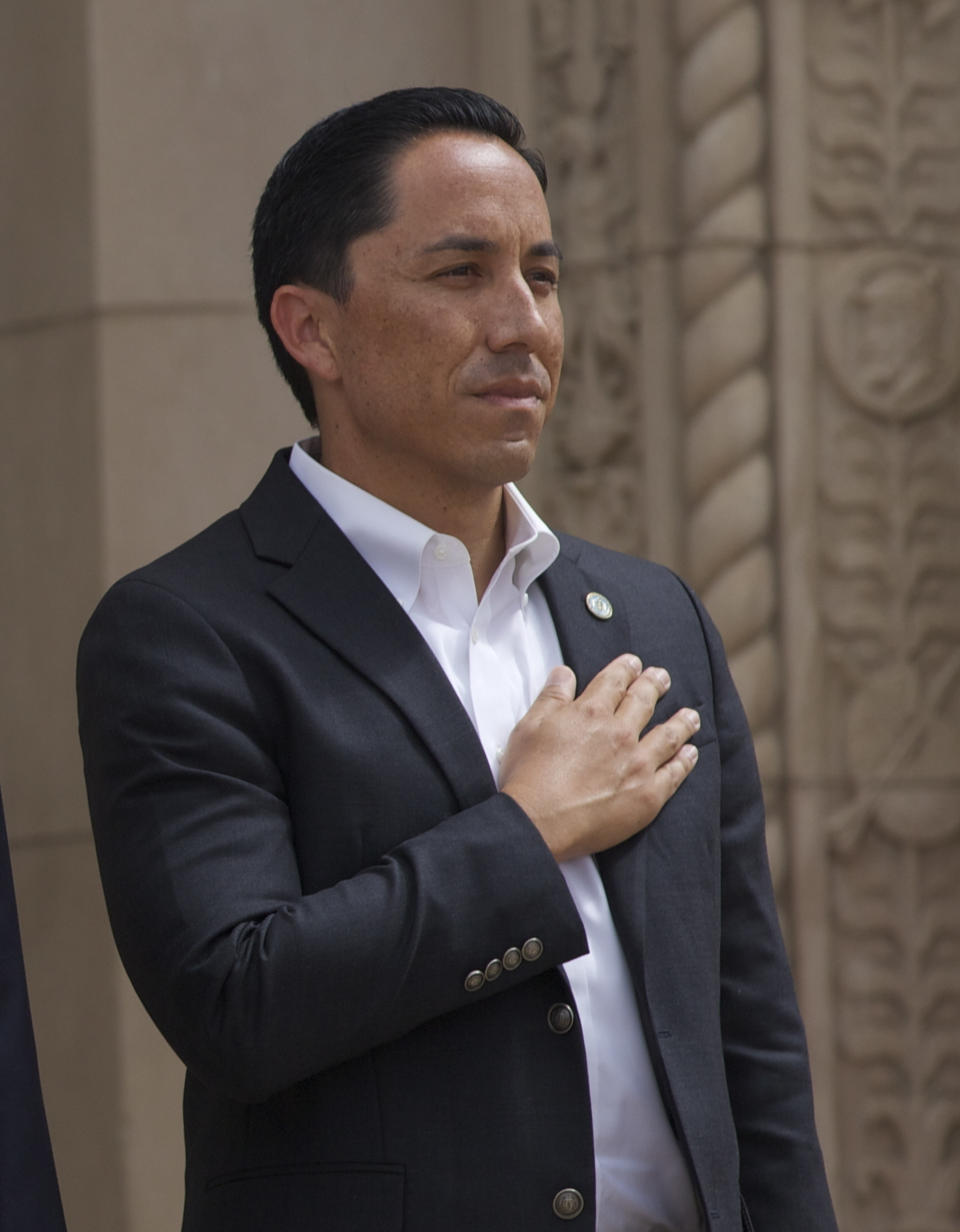
Todd Gloria is the current mayor of San Diego.

The city is governed by a mayor and a nine-member city council. In 2006, its government changed from a council–manager government to a strong mayor government, as decided by a citywide vote in 2004. The mayor is in effect the chief executive officer of the city, while the council is the legislative body. The City of San Diego is responsible for police, public safety, streets, water and sewer service, planning and zoning, and similar services within its borders. San Diego is a sanctuary city, however, San Diego County is a participant of the Secure Communities program. As of 2011, the city had one employee for every 137 residents, with a payroll greater than $733 million.

The members of the city council are each elected from single-member districts within the city. The mayor and city attorney are elected directly by the voters of the entire city. The mayor, city attorney, and council members are elected to four-year terms, with a two-term limit. Elections are held on a non-partisan basis per California state law; nevertheless, most officeholders do identify themselves as either Democrats or Republicans. In 2007, registered Democrats outnumbered Republicans by about 7 to 6 in the city, and Democrats currently (as of 2025) hold all nine seats on the city council. The current mayor, Todd Gloria, is a member of the Democratic Party.

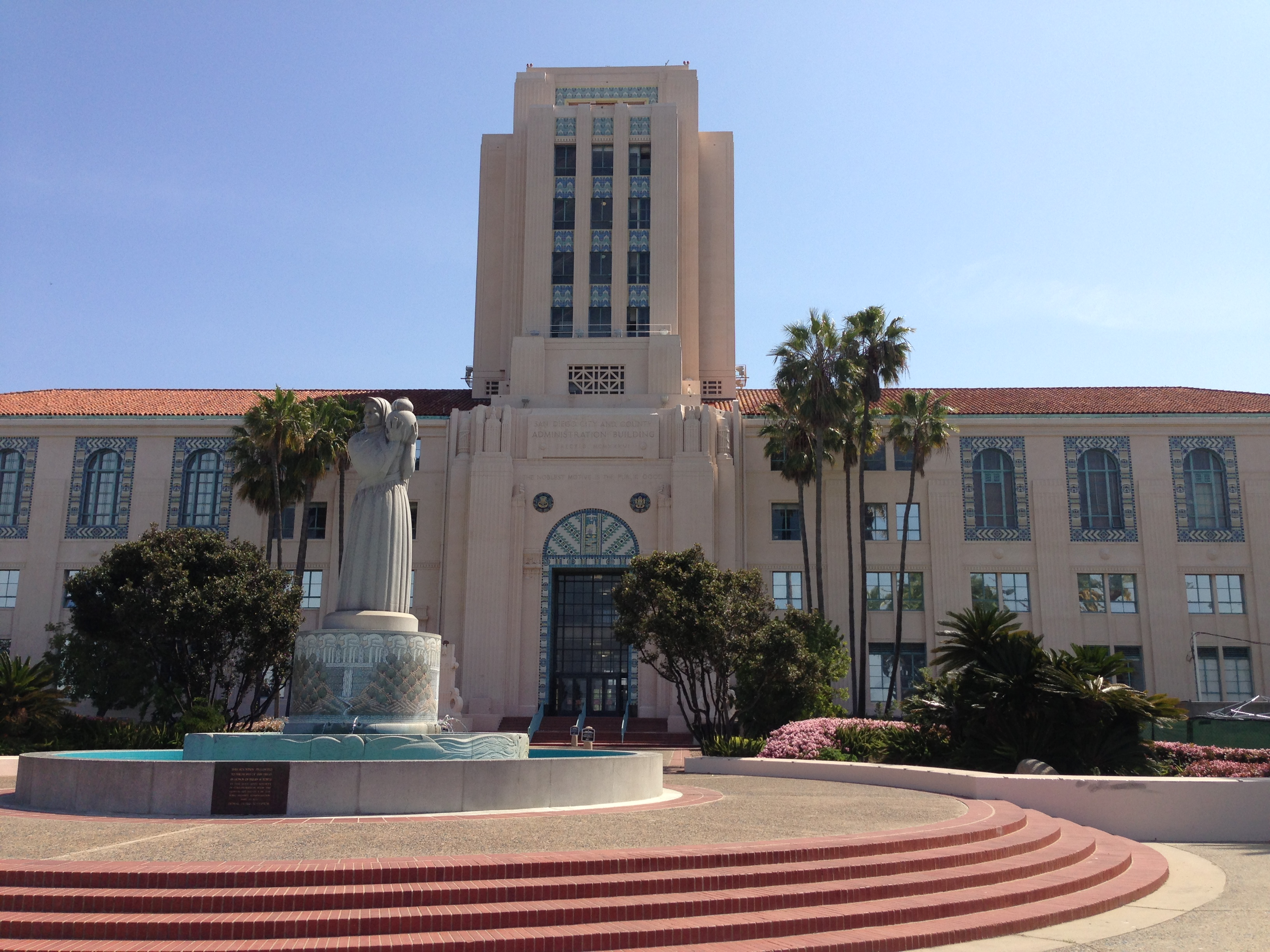
County Administration Center, seat of San Diego County Government

San Diego is part of San Diego County, and includes all or part of the 1st, 2nd, 3rd and 4th supervisorial districts of the San Diego County Board of Supervisors, Other county officers elected in part by city residents include the Sheriff, District Attorney, Assessor/Recorder/County Clerk, and Treasurer/Tax Collector.

Areas of the city immediately adjacent to San Diego Bay ("tidelands") are administered by the Port of San Diego, a quasi-governmental agency which owns all the property in the tidelands and is responsible for its land use planning, policing, and similar functions. San Diego is a member of the regional planning agency San Diego Association of Governments (SANDAG). Public schools within the city are managed and funded by independent school districts (see below).

After narrowly supporting Lyndon B. Johnson in 1964, San Diego provided majorities to all six Republican presidential candidates from 1968 to 1988. However, in more recent decades, San Diego has trended in favor of Democratic presidential candidates for president. George H. W. Bush in 1988 is the last Republican candidate to carry San Diego in a presidential election.

=== State and federal representation ===
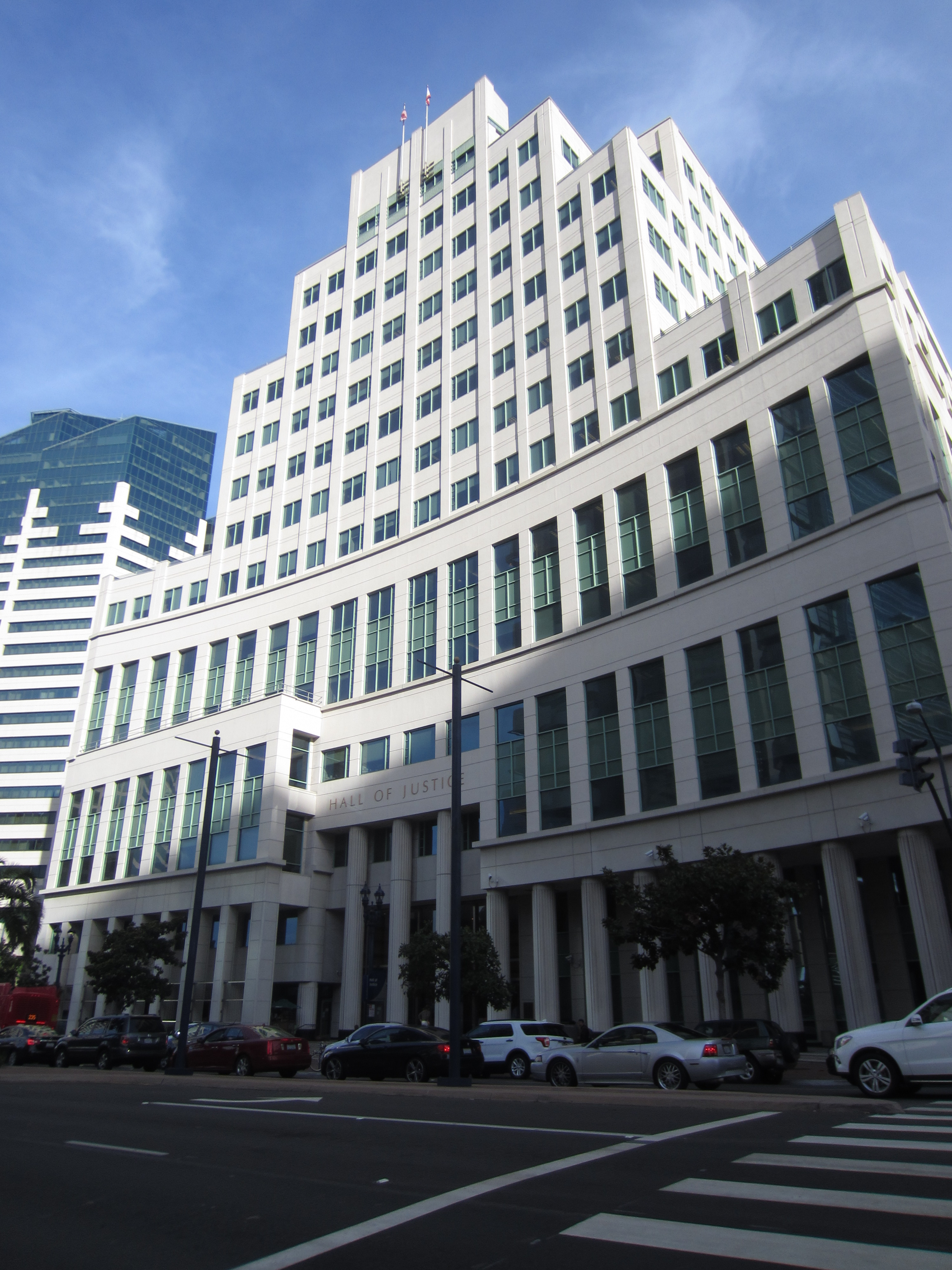
San Diego Hall of Justice

In the California State Senate, San Diego County encompasses the 38th, 39th and 40th districts, represented by Catherine Blakespear (D), Akilah Weber Pierson (D), and Brian Jones (R), respectively.

In the California State Assembly, lying partially within the city of San Diego are the 77th, 78th, 79th, and 80th districts, represented by Tasha Boerner (D), Chris Ward (D), LaShae Sharp-Collins (D), and David Alvarez (D), respectively.

In the United States House of Representatives, San Diego County includes parts or all of California's 48th, 49th, 50th, 51st, and 52nd congressional districts, represented by Darrell Issa (R), Mike Levin (D), Scott Peters (D), Sara Jacobs (D), and Juan Vargas (D) respectively.

=== Scandals ===
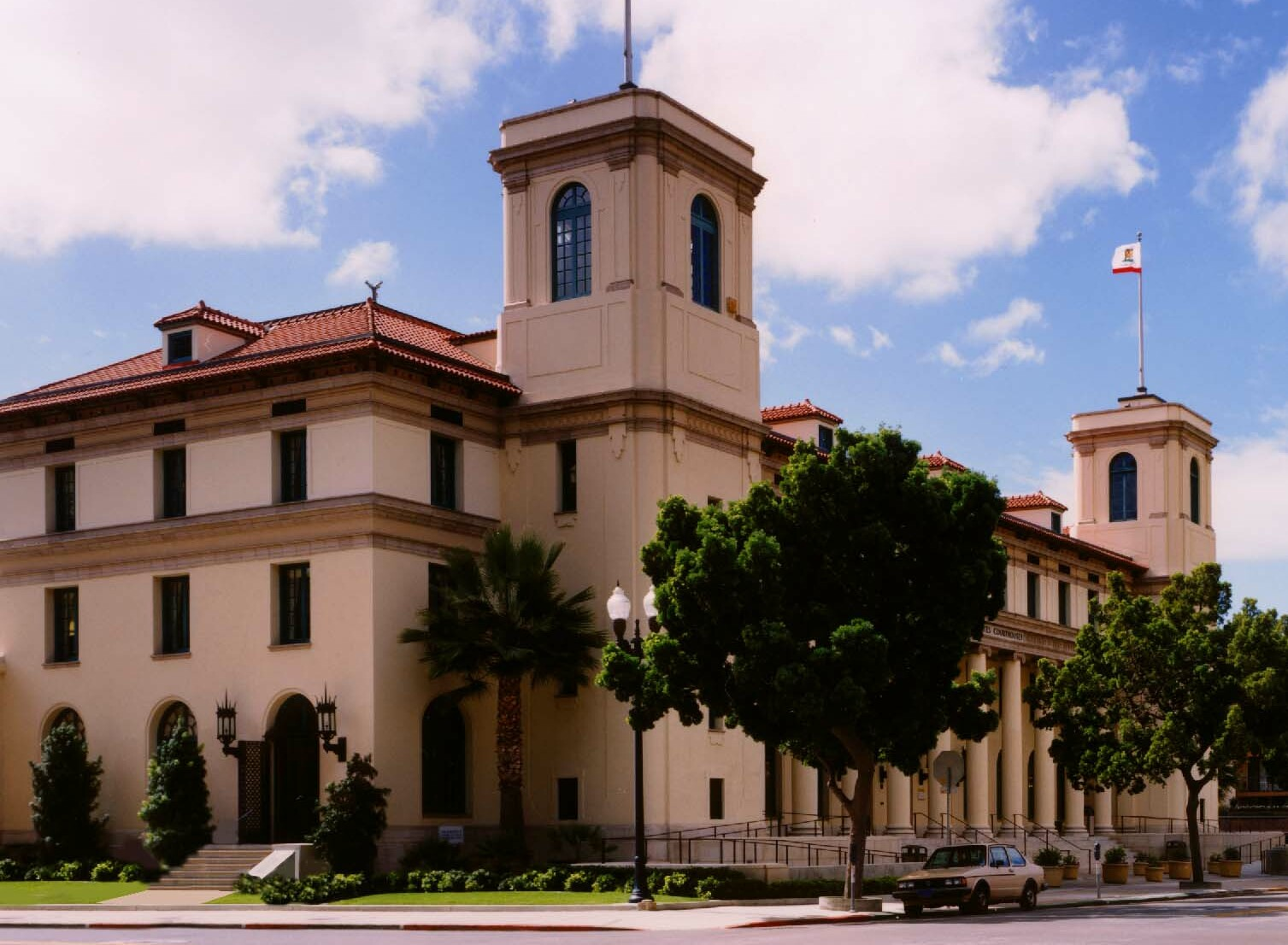
Weinberger U.S. Courthouse

San Diego was the site of the 1912 San Diego free speech fight, in which the city restricted speech, vigilantes brutalized and tortured anarchists, and the San Diego Police Department killed a member of the Industrial Workers of the World (IWW).

In 1916, rainmaker Charles Hatfield was blamed for $4 million in damages and accused of causing San Diego's worst flood, during which about 20 Japanese American farmers died.

Then-mayor Roger Hedgecock was forced to resign his post in 1985, after he was found guilty of one count of conspiracy and 12 counts of perjury, related to the alleged failure to report all campaign contributions. After a series of appeals, the 12 perjury counts were dismissed in 1990 based on claims of juror misconduct; the remaining conspiracy count was reduced to a misdemeanor and then dismissed.

A 2002 scheme to underfund pensions for city employees led to the San Diego pension scandal. This resulted in the resignation of newly re-elected Mayor Dick Murphy and the criminal indictment of six pension board members. Those charges were finally dismissed by a federal judge in 2010.

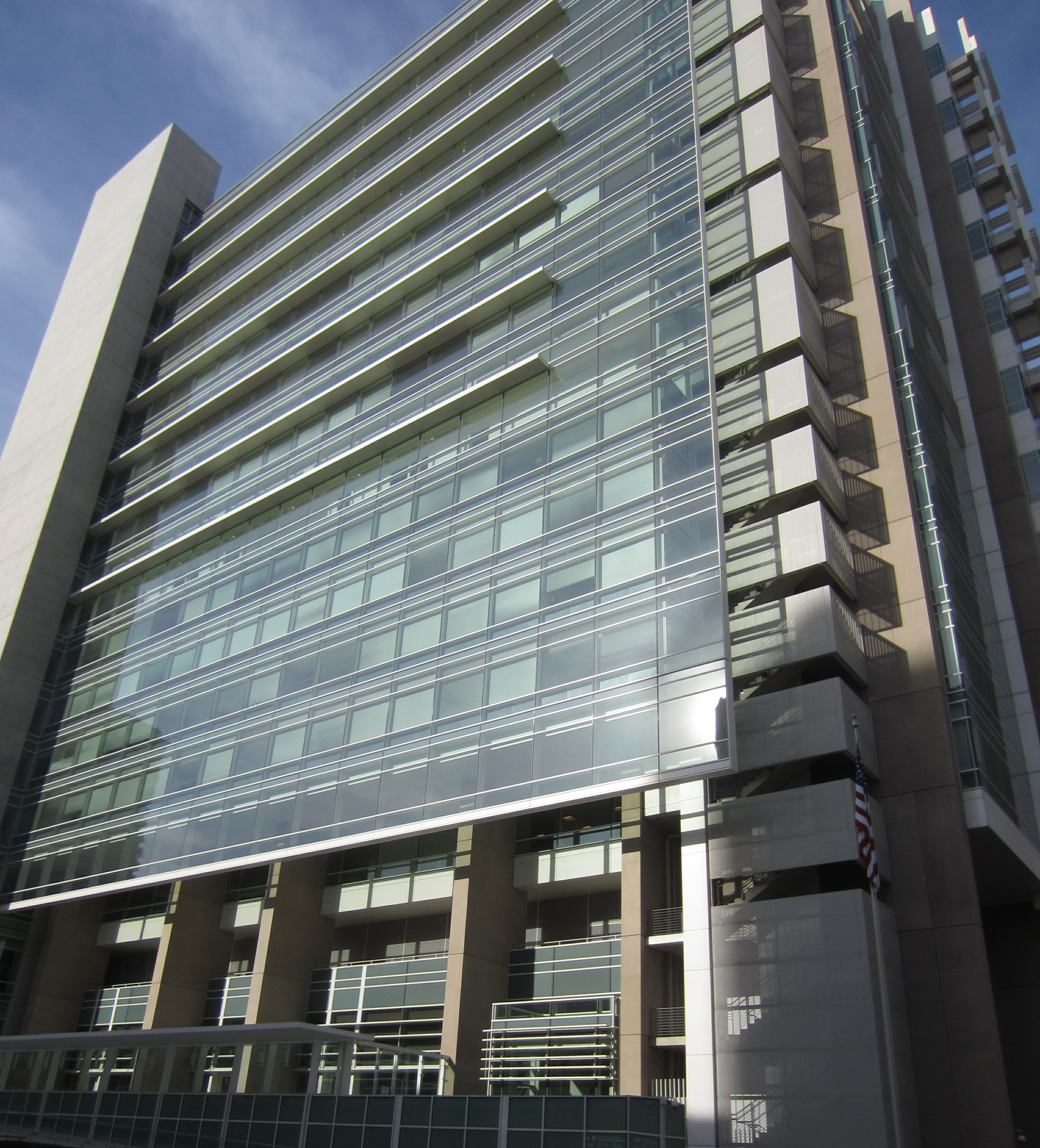
Carter-Keep U.S. Courthouse

On November 28, 2005, U.S. Congressman Randy "Duke" Cunningham resigned after being convicted on federal bribery charges. He had represented California's 50th congressional district, which includes much of the northern portion of the city of San Diego. In 2006, Cunningham was sentenced to a 100-month prison sentence.

In 2005 two city council members, Ralph Inzunza and Deputy Mayor Michael Zucchet, were convicted of extortion, wire fraud, and conspiracy to commit wire fraud for taking campaign contributions from a strip club owner and his associates, allegedly in exchange for trying to repeal the city's "no touch" laws at strip clubs. Both subsequently resigned. Inzunza was sentenced to 21 months in prison. In 2009, a judge acquitted Zucchet on seven out of the nine counts against him, and granted his petition for a new trial on the other two charges; the remaining charges were eventually dropped.

In July 2013, three former supporters of Mayor Bob Filner asked him to resign because of allegations of repeated sexual harassment. Over the ensuing six weeks, 18 women came forward to publicly claim that Filner had sexually harassed them, and multiple individuals and groups called for him to resign. Filner agreed to resign effective August 30, 2013, subsequently pleading guilty to one felony count of false imprisonment and two misdemeanor battery charges.

=== Crime ===
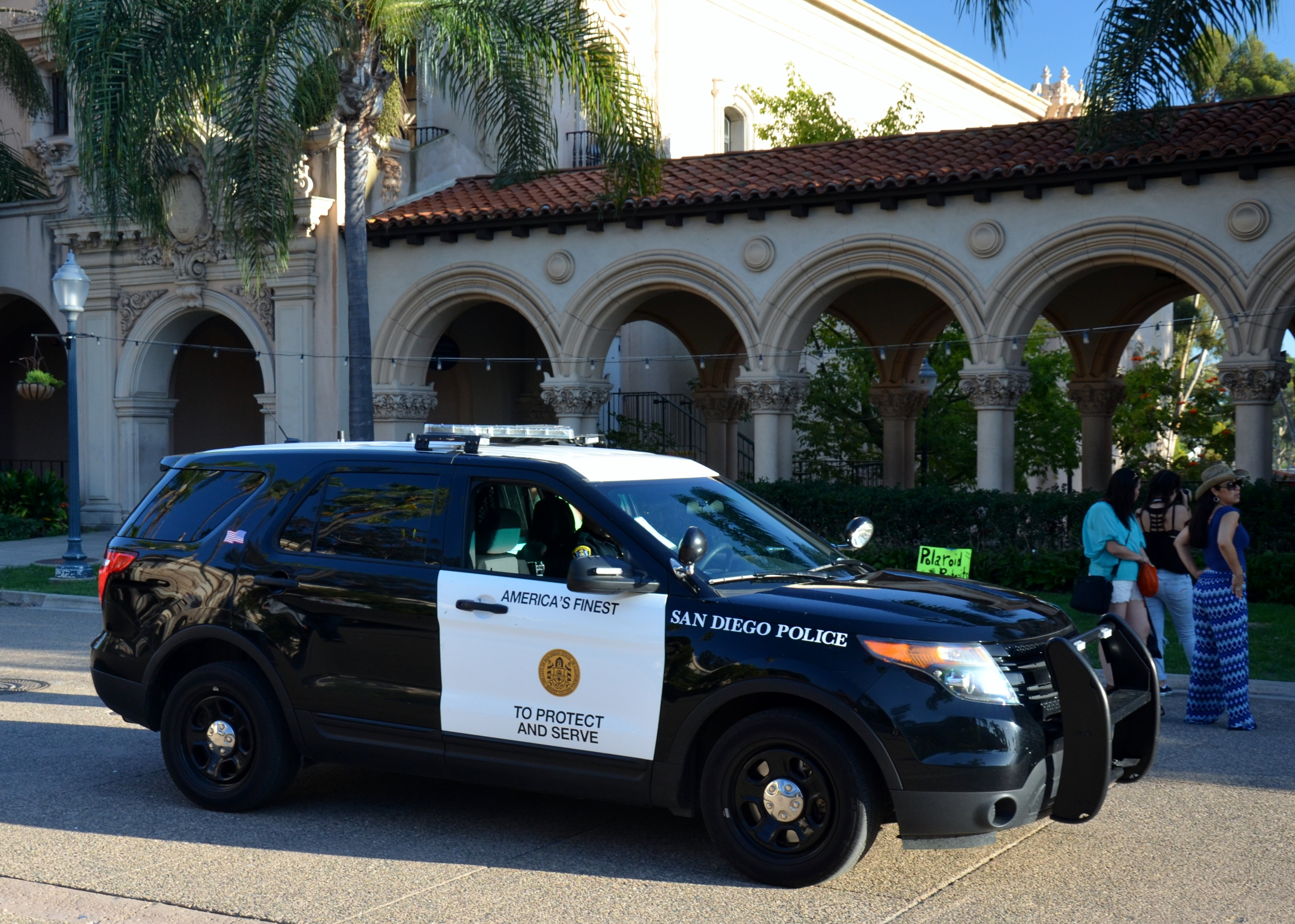
San Diego Police Department

Like most major cities, San Diego had a declining crime rate from 1990 to 2000. 1991 would mark the city's deadliest year, registering 179 homicides within city limits (while the region as a whole peaked at 278 homicides), capping off an unabated, eight-year climb in murders, rapes, robberies, and assault dating back to 1983. At the time, the city was ranked last among the 10 most populous U.S. cities in homicides per 1,000 population, and ninth in crimes per 1,000. From 1980 to 1994, San Diego surpassed 100 murders ten times before tapering off to 91 homicides in 1995. That number would not exceed 79 for the next 15 years. Crime in San Diego increased in the early 2000s. In 2004, San Diego had the sixth lowest crime rate of any U.S. city with over half a million residents. From 2002 to 2006, the crime rate overall dropped 0.8%, though not evenly by category. While violent crime decreased 12.4% during this period, property crime increased 1.1%. Total property crimes per 100,000 people were lower than the national average in 2008.

According to Uniform Crime Report statistics compiled by the Federal Bureau of Investigation (FBI) in 2010, there were 5,616 violent crimes and 30,753 property crimes. Of these, the violent crimes consisted of forcible rapes, 73 robberies and 170 aggravated assaults, while 6,387 burglaries, 17,977 larceny-thefts, 6,389 motor vehicle thefts and 155 acts of arson defined the property offenses. In 2013, San Diego had the lowest murder rate of the ten largest cities in the United States.

== Education ==
=== Primary and secondary schools ===
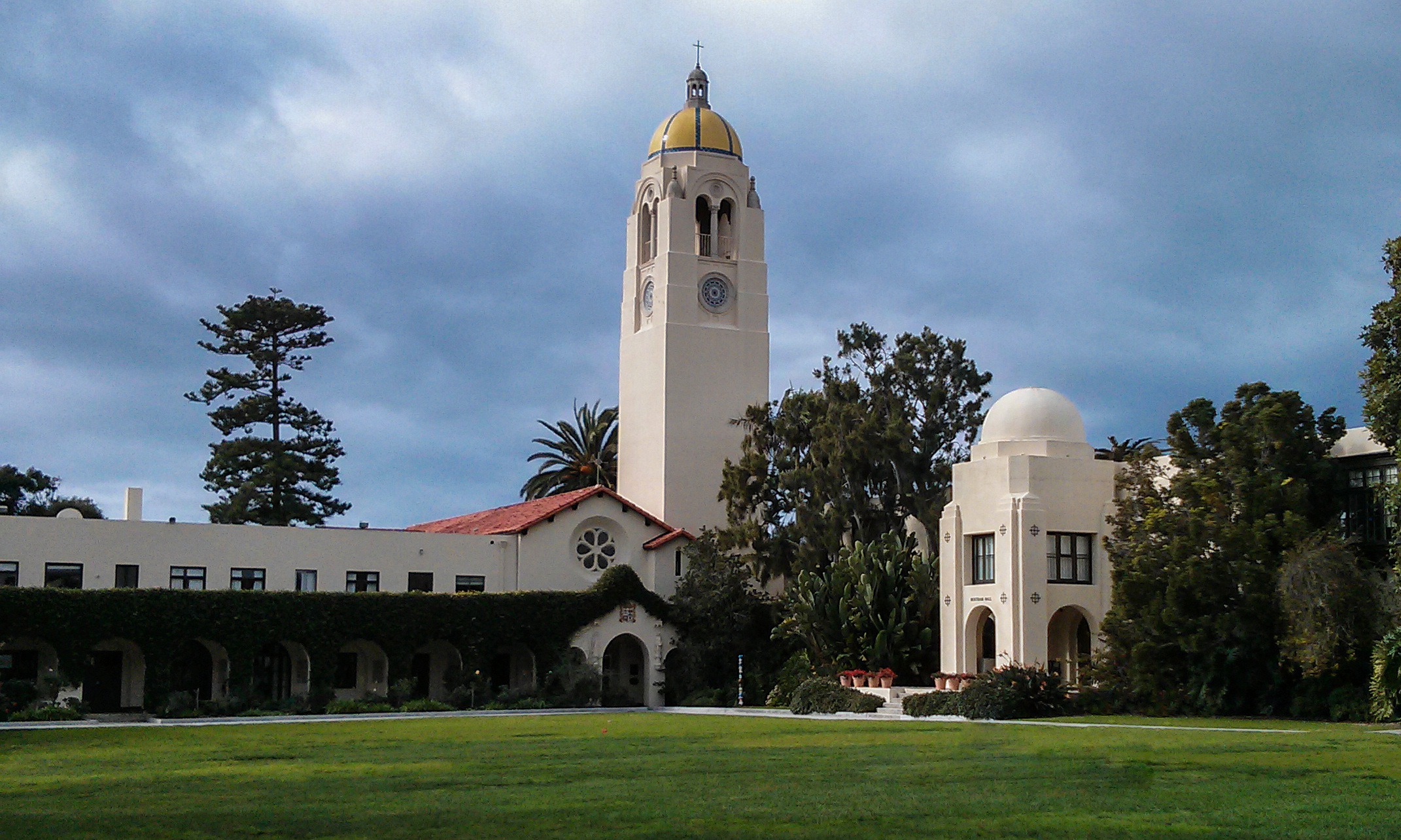
The Bishop's School in La Jolla

Public schools in San Diego are operated by independent school districts. The majority of the public schools in the city are served by San Diego Unified School District, the second-largest school district in California, which includes 11 K–8 schools, 107 elementary schools, 24 middle schools, 13 atypical and alternative schools, 28 high schools, and 45 charter schools.

Several adjacent school districts which are headquartered outside the city limits serve some schools within the city; these include Poway Unified School District, Del Mar Union School District, San Dieguito Union High School District, and Sweetwater Union High School District. In addition, there are a number of private schools in the city.

=== Colleges and universities ===
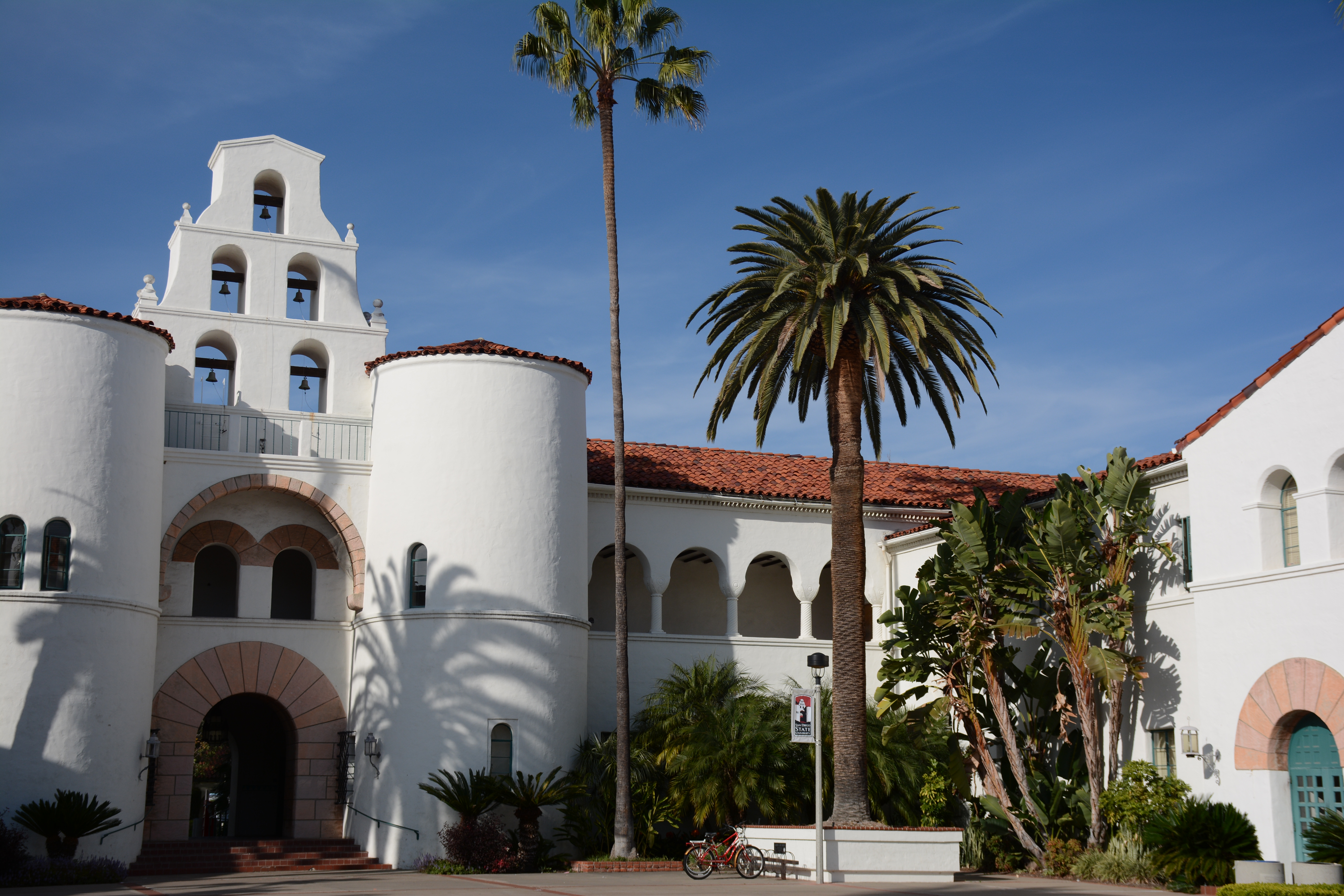
San Diego State University

According to education rankings released by the U.S. Census Bureau in 2017, 44.4% of San Diegans (city, not county) ages 25 and older hold bachelor's degrees, compared to 30.9% in the United States as a whole.

The largest university in the area is the University of California, San Diego (UC San Diego). The university is the southernmost campus of the University of California system and is the second-largest employer in the city. It has the seventh largest research expenditure in the country.

Other public colleges and universities in the city include San Diego State University (SDSU) and the San Diego Community College District, which includes San Diego City College, San Diego Mesa College, and San Diego Miramar College.

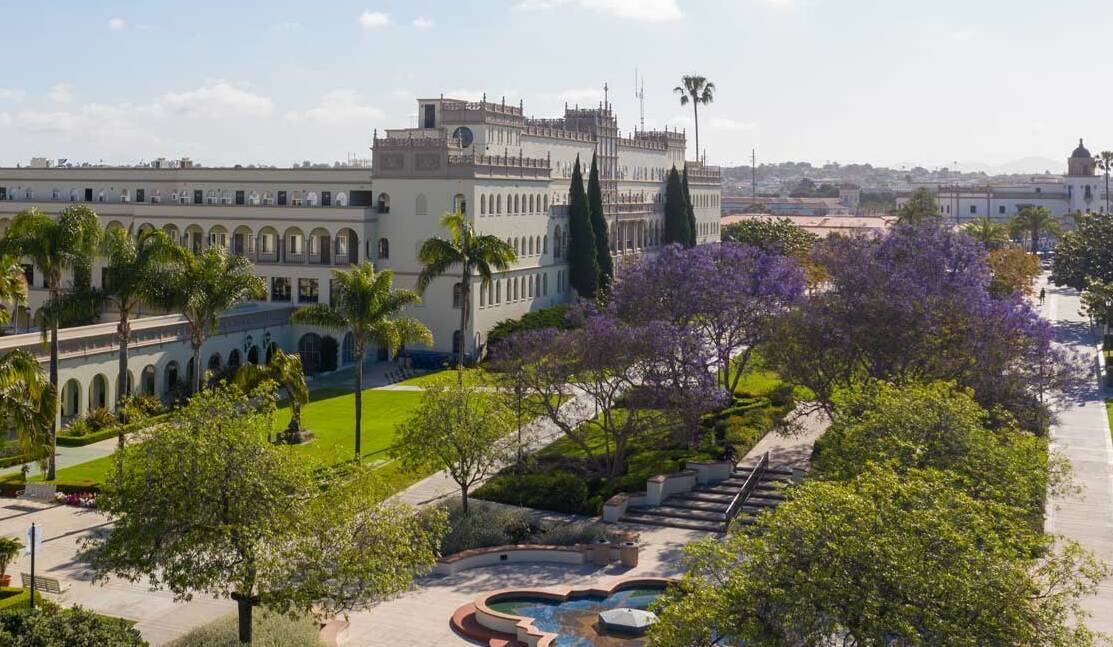
University of San Diego

Private non-profit colleges and universities in the city include the University of San Diego (USD), Point Loma Nazarene University (PLNU), National University's San Diego campus, University of Redlands' School of Business San Diego campus, and Brandman University's San Diego campus. For-profit institutions include Alliant International University (AIU), Fashion Institute of Design & Merchandising's San Diego campus, NewSchool of Architecture and Design, Southern States University (SSU), UEI College, and Woodbury University School of Architecture's satellite campus.

There is one medical school in the city, the UC San Diego School of Medicine. There are two ABA accredited law schools in the city, which include California Western School of Law and University of San Diego School of Law. There are also two law schools, Thomas Jefferson School of Law and Western Sierra Law School, not accredited by the ABA.

=== Libraries ===
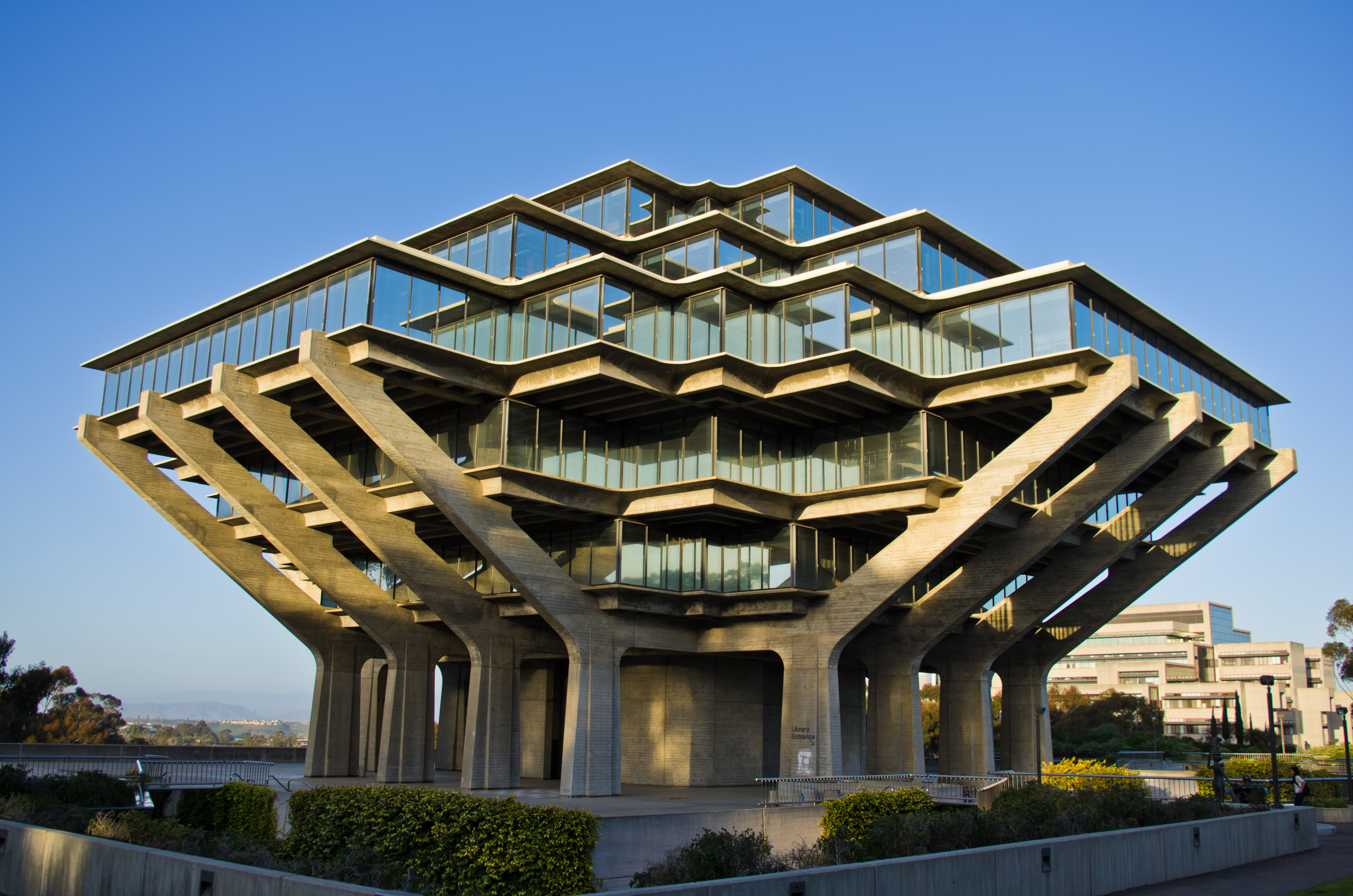
Geisel Library at UC San Diego

The city-run San Diego Public Library system is headquartered downtown and has 36 branches throughout the city. The newest location is in Skyline Hills, which broke ground in 2015. The libraries have had reduced operating hours since 2003 due to the city's financial problems. In 2006 the city increased spending on libraries by $2.1 million. A new nine-story Central Library on Park Boulevard at J Street opened on September 30, 2013.

In addition to the municipal public library system, there are nearly two dozen libraries open to the public run by other governmental agencies, and by schools, colleges, and universities. Noteworthy are Malcolm A. Love Library at San Diego State University, and Geisel Library at the University of California, San Diego.

== Culture ==
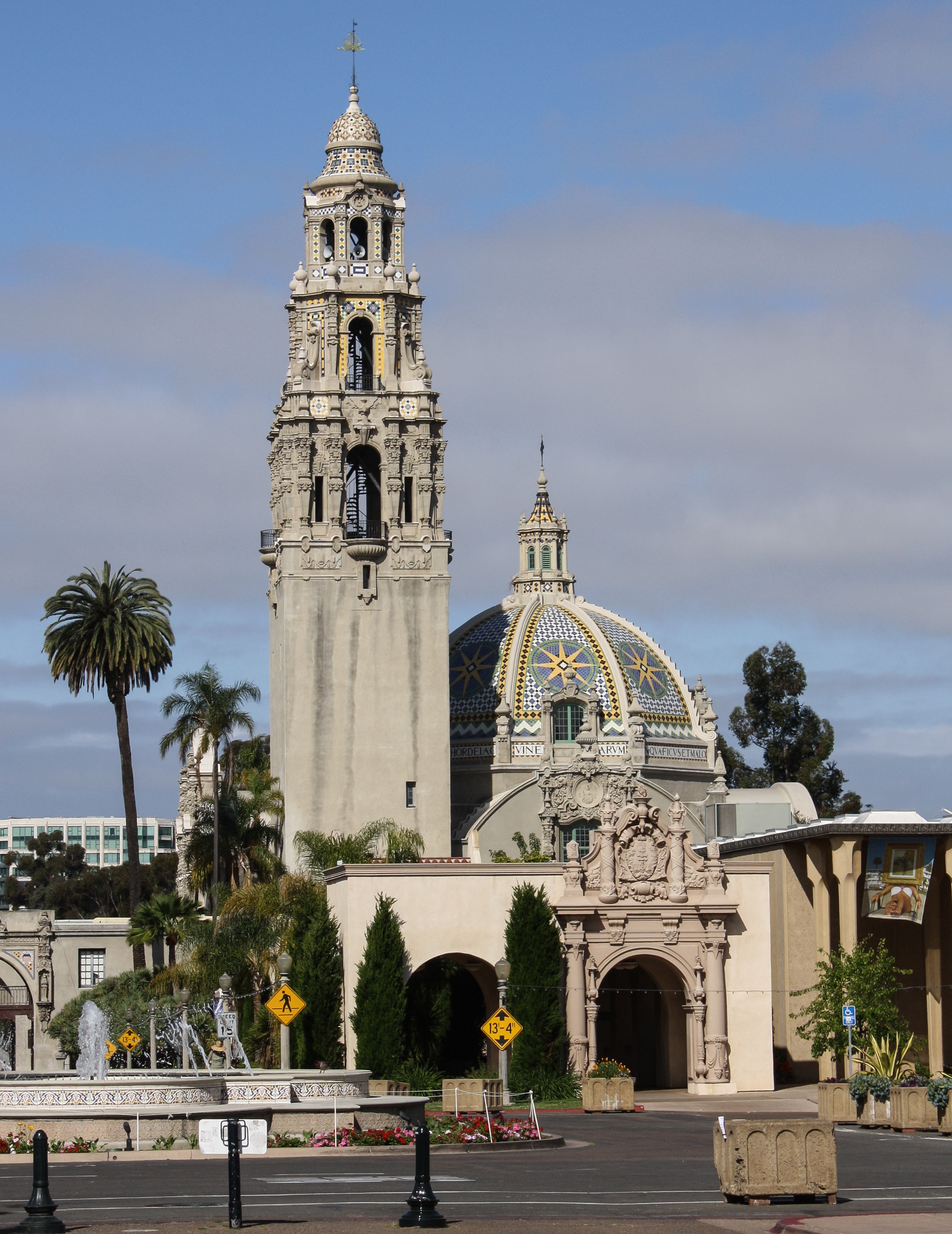
The Museum of Us

The culture of San Diego is influenced heavily by the mixing of American and Mexican cultures, due to the city's position on the Mexico–United States border, its large Chicano population, and its history as part of Hispanic America and Mexico. San Diego's longtime association with the U.S. military also contributes to its culture. There are many Greek and Mediterranean restaurants in San Diego.

Many popular museums, such as the San Diego Museum of Art, the San Diego Natural History Museum, the Museum of Us, the Museum of Photographic Arts, and the San Diego Air & Space Museum, are located in Balboa Park, which is also the location of the San Diego Zoo. The Museum of Contemporary Art San Diego (MCASD) is located in La Jolla and has a branch located at Santa Fe Depot downtown.

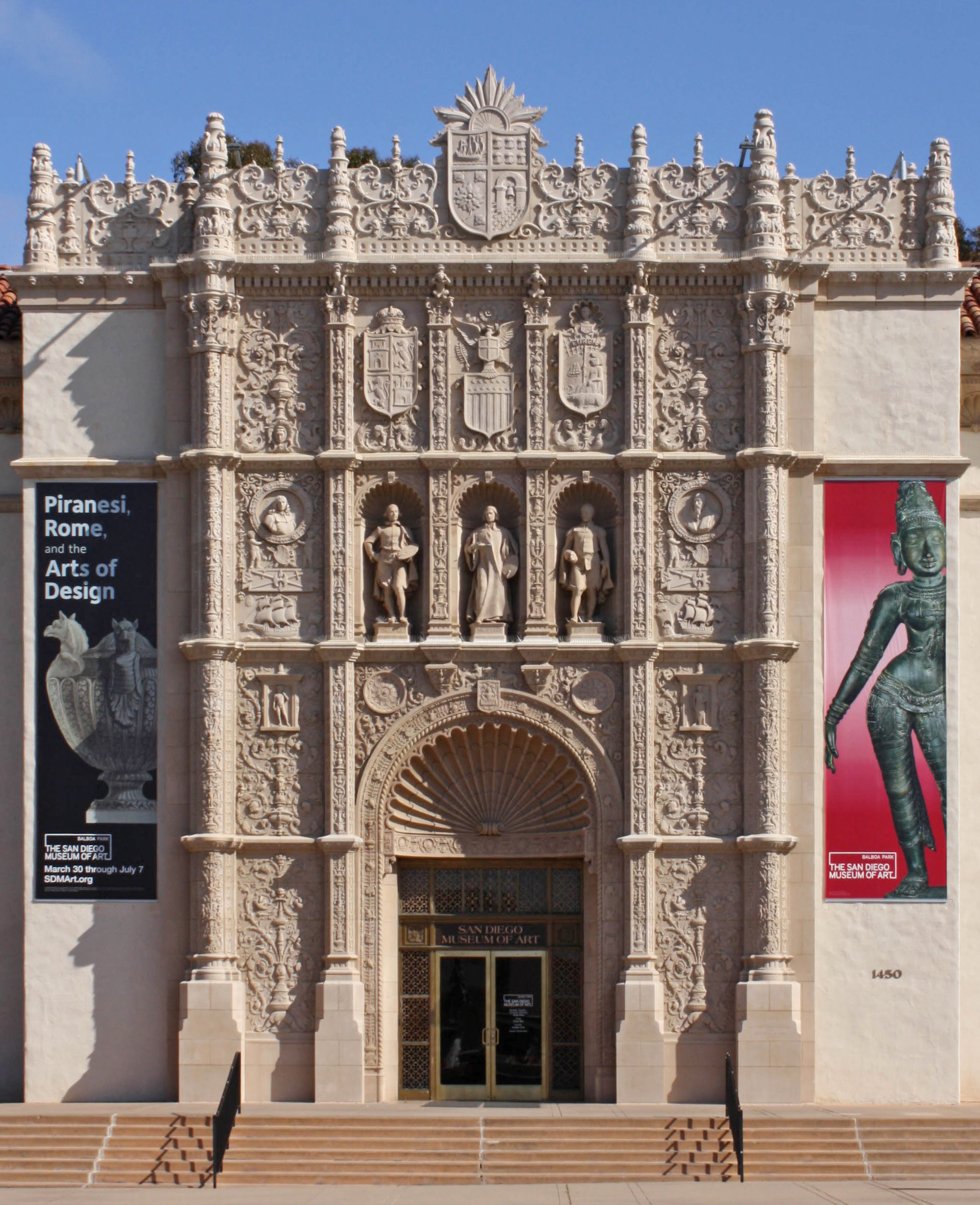
The San Diego Museum of Art

The Columbia district downtown is home to historic ship exhibits belonging to the Maritime Museum of San Diego, headlined by Star of India, as well as the unrelated USS Midway Museum featuring the USS Midway aircraft carrier.

The San Diego Symphony at Symphony Towers performs on a regular basis; from 2004 to 2017, its director was Jahja Ling. The San Diego Opera at Civic Center Plaza, directed by David Bennett. Old Globe Theatre at Balboa Park produces about 15 plays and musicals annually. La Jolla Playhouse at UC San Diego is directed by Christopher Ashley. Both the Old Globe Theatre and La Jolla Playhouse have produced the world premieres of plays and musicals that have gone on to win Tony Awards or nominations on Broadway. The Joan B. Kroc Theatre at Kroc Center's Performing Arts Center is a 600-seat state-of-the-art theater that hosts music, dance, and theater performances. Hundreds of movies have been filmed in the county and a dozen TV shows have been set in San Diego, a tradition going back as far as 1898.

=== LGBT community ===
According to a 2021 report by the UCLA School of Law, San Diego has the 16th largest LGBT population amongst U.S. Metropolitan areas. San Diego's Hillcrest neighborhood has long served as the city's gay village and is home to The San Diego LGBT Community Center, as well as many gay bars, clubs, and queer-owned businesses. The restaurant and nightclub Gossip Grill, located in Hillcrest, is San Diego's only queer and women-focused venue and is notable as one of the country's last remaining "lesbian bars". The nearby neighborhood of Northpark is the location of Lips, a drag club and home base of RuPaul's Drag Race All Stars (Season 1) winner Chad Michaels.

The Hillcrest neighborhood is also home to the Lambda Archives of San Diego, a non-profit, publicly accessible archive that collects, preserves, and shares the history of lesbian, gay, bisexual, transgender and all queer people in the region.

The city hosts a Pride Parade and Pride Festival each year. Unlike most other cities, San Diego celebrates Pride in July, a tradition dating back to the early 1990s, when the city's "June gloom" weather led to the 1990 parade getting rained out.

== Sports ==
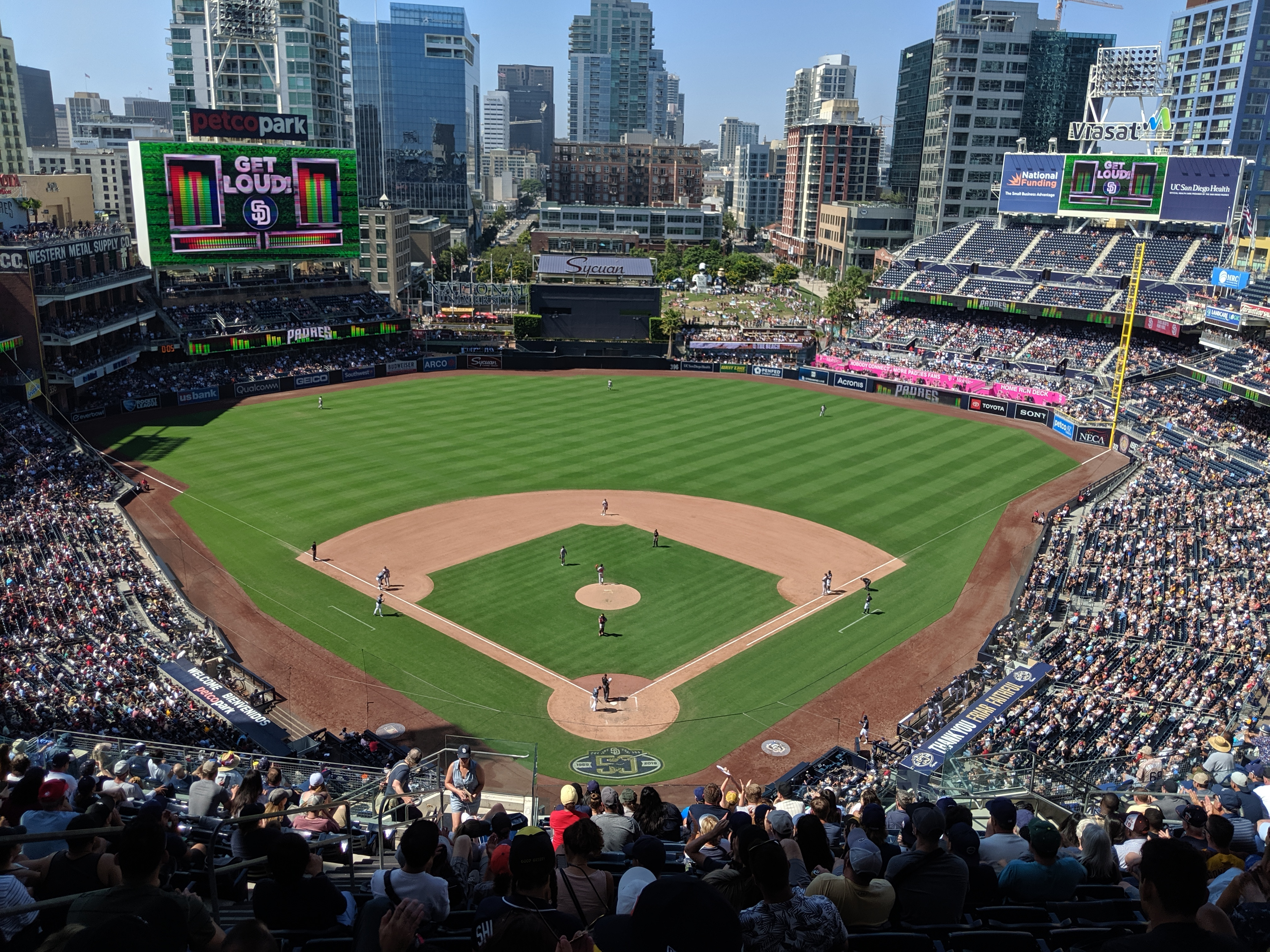
Petco Park, home of the San Diego Padres (MLB)

Sports in San Diego includes major professional league teams, other highest-level professional league teams, minor league teams, and college athletics. San Diego hosts two teams of the major professional leagues, the San Diego Padres of Major League Baseball (MLB), San Diego FC of Major League Soccer (MLS). The city is home to three universities whose teams compete in the National Collegiate Athletic Association's (NCAA) Division I. The Sentry, a professional golf tournament on the PGA Tour, is played annually at Torrey Pines Golf Course.

San Diego hosted the National Football League's (NFL) San Diego Chargers from 1961 to 2017, when the team relocated to the Greater Los Angeles area (now the Los Angeles Chargers). The city also hosted the National Basketball Association's (NBA) San Diego Rockets from 1967 to 1971 (now the Houston Rockets) and San Diego Clippers from 1978 to 1984 (now the Los Angeles Clippers). San Diego has never hosted a National Hockey League (NHL) franchise, though it hosted the San Diego Mariners of the now-defunct World Hockey Association (WHA) from 1974 to 1977.

Currently, there is no NBA, NFL, or NHL team in the city. San Diego is the largest American city not to have won a championship in a major professional league. The city does have one major league title to its name: the 1963 American Football League (AFL) Championship won by the San Diego Chargers, when the AFL was an independent entity prior to the AFL–NFL merger in 1970. Some San Diego sports fans believe there is a curse on professional sports in the city.

The San Diego Clippers of the NBA G League and the San Diego Seals of the National Lacrosse League play at Frontwave Arena in the suburb of Oceanside. Pechanga Arena hosts the San Diego Gulls of the American Hockey League.

In March 2026, it was announced that San Diego's Snapdragon Stadium will host 11 matches during the LA28 Olympic Football (Soccer) Tournament in July 2028.

== Media ==
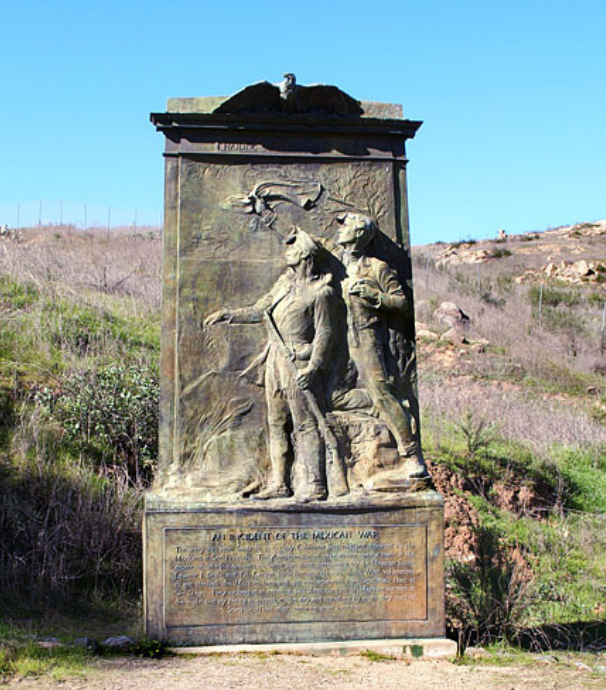
The San Pasqual Battlefield Monument commemorates the 1846 Battle of San Pasqual.

Published within the city are the daily newspaper, The San Diego Union-Tribune and its online portal of the same name, and the alternative newsweeklies, San Diego CityBeat and the San Diego Reader. The Times of San Diego is a free online newspaper covering news in the metropolitan area. Voice of San Diego is a non-profit online news outlet covering government, politics, education, neighborhoods, and the arts. The San Diego Daily Transcript is a business-oriented online newspaper. San Diego is also the headquarters of the national far-right cable TV channel One America News Network (OANN).

San Diego led U.S. local markets with 69.6 percent broadband penetration in 2004 according to Nielsen//NetRatings.

San Diego's first television station was KFMB, which began broadcasting on May 16, 1949. Since the Federal Communications Commission (FCC) licensed seven television stations in Los Angeles, two VHF channels were available for San Diego because of its relative proximity to the larger city. In 1952, however, the FCC began licensing UHF channels, making it possible for cities such as San Diego to acquire more stations. Stations based in Mexico (with ITU prefixes of XE and XH) also serve the San Diego market. Television stations today include XHJK-TDT 1 (Azteca Uno), XETV-TDT 6 (Canal 5/Nueve), KFMB 8 (CBS, with MNTV on DT2), KGTV 10 (ABC), XHCPDE 11 (Once), XEWT 12 (Televisa Regional), KPBS 15 (PBS), KBNT-CD 17 (Univision), XHTIT-TDT 21 (Azteca 7), XHAS-TDT 33 (Canal 66), KDTF-LD 36 (Unimás), KNSD 39 (NBC), KSKT-CD 43 (Estrella TV), XHBJ-TDT 45 (Canal 45 PSN), KUAN-LD 48 (Telemundo), XHDTV-TDT 49 (Milenio Televisión), KUSI 51 (The CW), XHUAA-TDT 57 (El Canal de las Estrellas), and KSWB-TV 69 (Fox). San Diego has an 80.6 percent cable penetration rate.

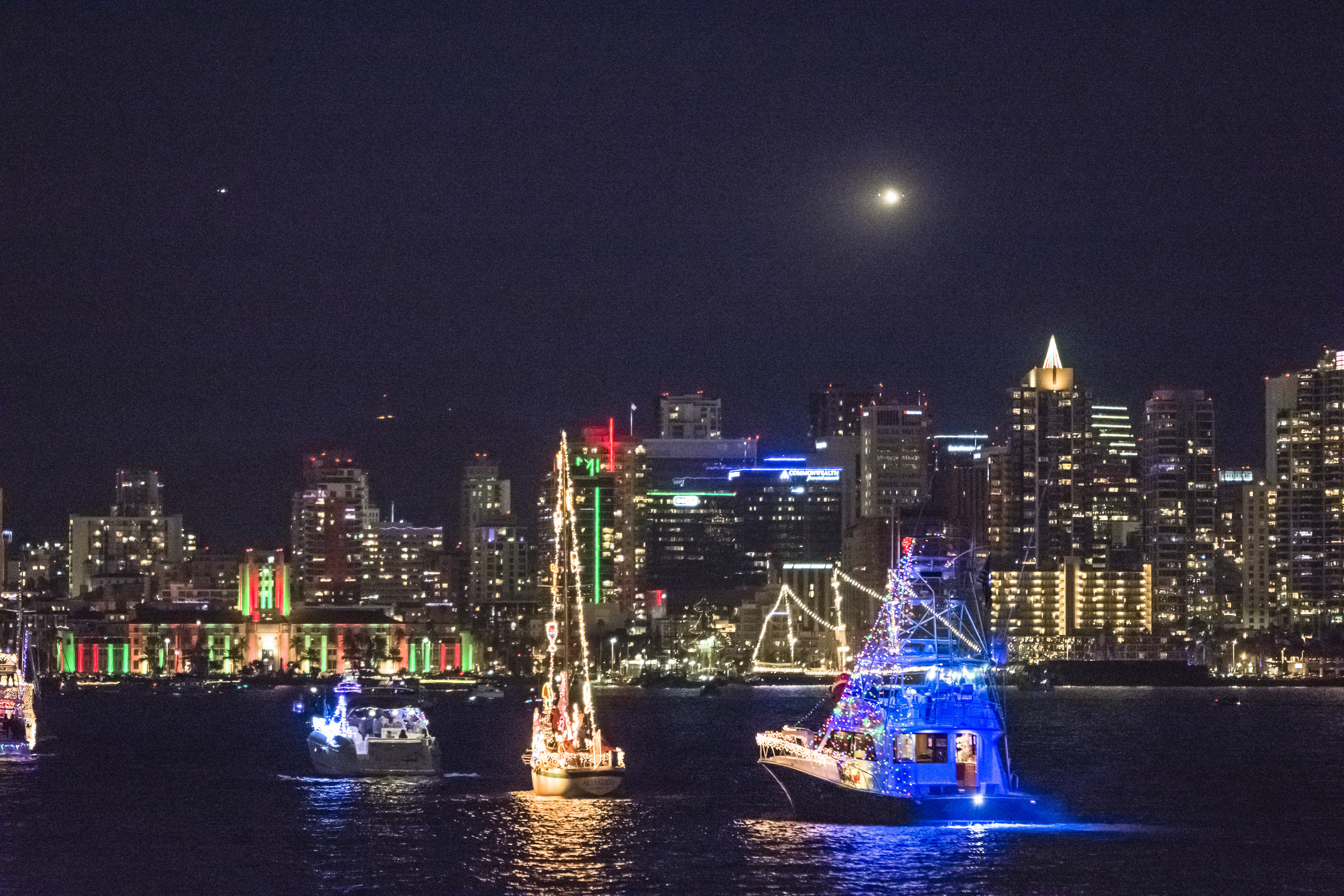
San Diego Parade of Lights

Due to the ratio of U.S. and Mexican-licensed stations, San Diego is the largest media market in the United States that is legally unable to support a television station duopoly between two full-power stations under FCC regulations, which disallow duopolies in metropolitan areas with fewer than nine full-power television stations and require that there would be eight unique station owners that remain once a duopoly is formed (there are only seven full-power stations on the California side of the San Diego-Tijuana market). As a whole, the Mexico side of the San Diego-Tijuana market has two duopolies and one triopoly (Entravision Communications owns XHDTV-TV, Azteca owns XHJK-TV and XHTIT-TV, and Grupo Televisa owns XETV-TV, XHUAA-TV and XEWT-TV.

San Diego's television market is limited to only San Diego County. As a result, San Diego is the largest single-county media market in the United States.

The radio stations in San Diego include nationwide broadcaster iHeartMedia, Audacy, Inc., Local Media San Diego, and many other smaller stations and networks. Stations include: KOGO AM 600, KGB AM 760, KCEO AM 1000, KCBQ AM 1170, K-Praise, KLSD AM 1360, KFSD 1450 AM, KPBS-FM 89.5, Channel 933, Star 94.1, FM 94/9, FM News and Talk 95.7, Q96 96.1, KyXy 96.5, Free Radio San Diego (AKA Pirate Radio San Diego) 96.9FM FRSD, KWFN 97.3, KXSN 98.1, Frontera FM 100.7, 101.5 KGB-FM, KLVJ 102.1, KSON 103.7, Rock 105.3, and another Pirate Radio station at 106.9FM, as well as a number of local Spanish-language radio stations.

== Infrastructure ==
=== Transportation ===
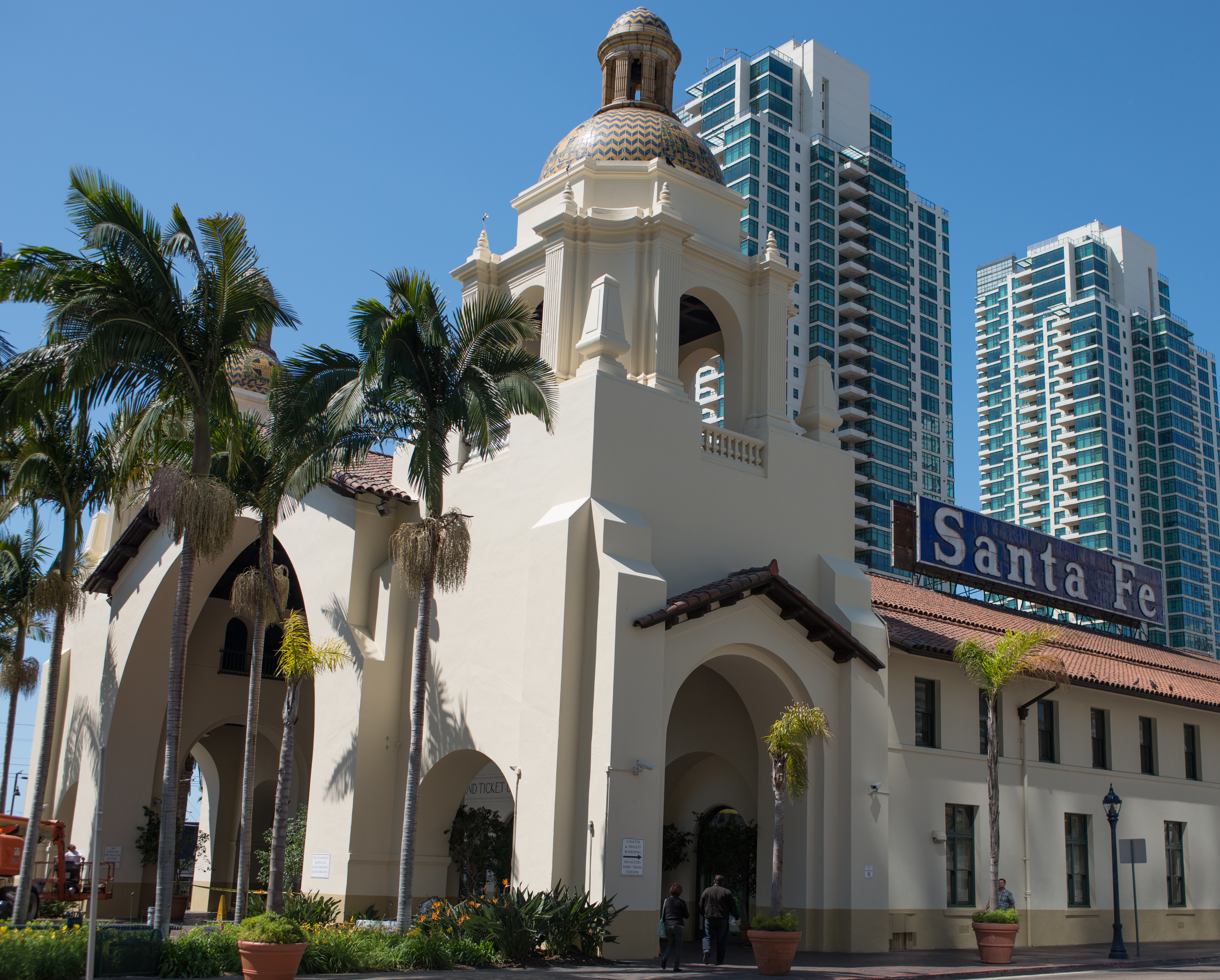
Santa Fe Depot is served by Amtrak California and Coaster trains.

With the automobile being the primary means of transportation for over 80 percent of residents, San Diego is served by a network of freeways and highways. This includes I-5, which runs south to Tijuana and north to Los Angeles; Interstate 8, which runs east to Imperial County and the Arizona Sun Corridor; Interstate 15, which runs northeast through the Inland Empire to Las Vegas and Salt Lake City; and I-805, which splits from I-5 near the Mexican border and rejoins I-5 at Sorrento Valley.

Major state highways include SR 94, which connects downtown with I-805, I-15 and East County; SR 163, which connects downtown with the northeast part of the city, intersects I-805 and merges with I-15 at Miramar; SR 52, which connects La Jolla with East County through Santee and SR 125; SR 56, which connects I-5 with I-15 through Carmel Valley and Rancho Peñasquitos; SR 75, which spans San Diego Bay as the San Diego–Coronado Bridge, and also passes through South San Diego as Palm Avenue; and SR 905, which connects I-5 and I-805 to the Otay Mesa Port of Entry.

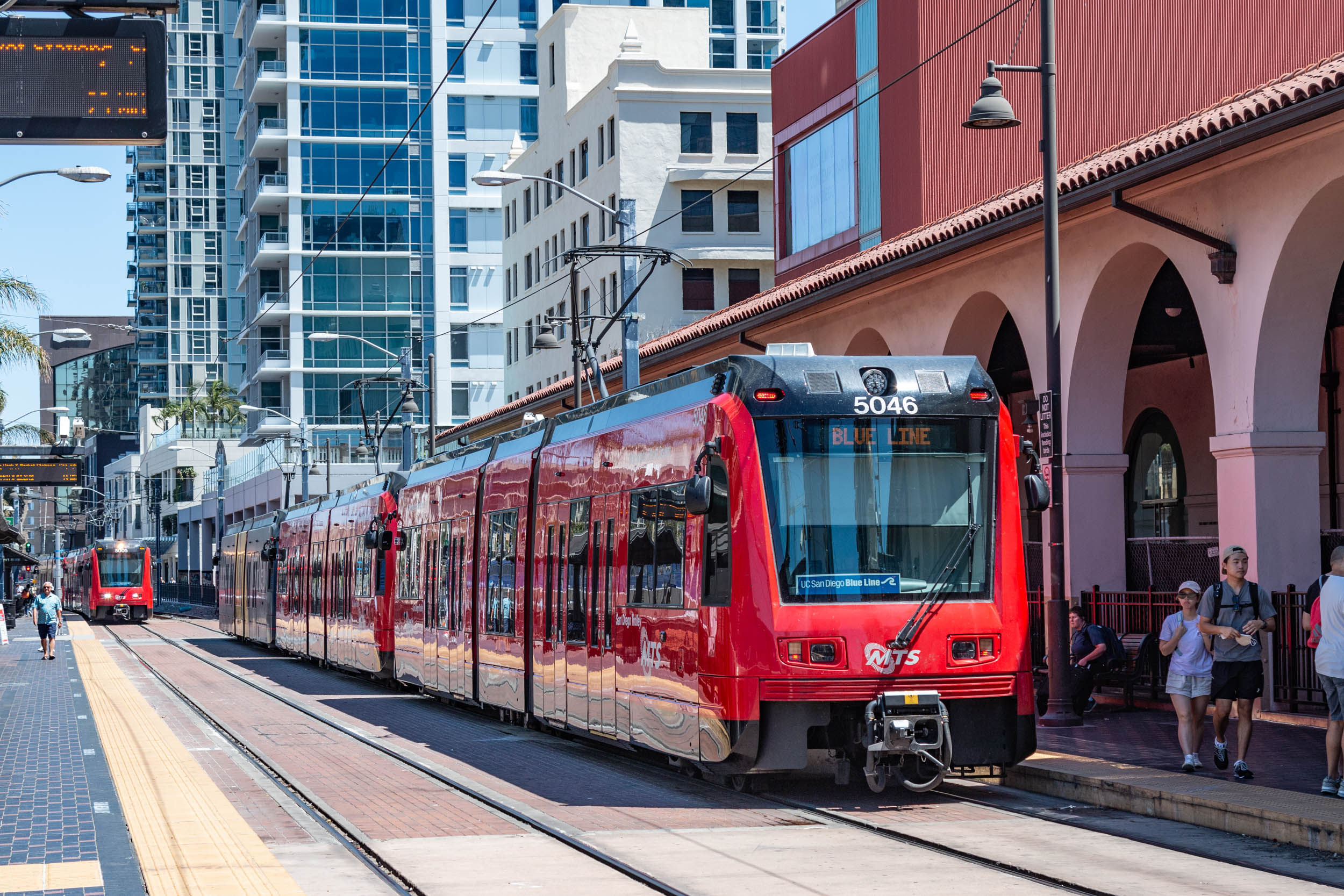
San Diego Trolley is operated by the S.D. Metropolitan Transit System.

The stretch of SR 163 that passes through Balboa Park is San Diego's oldest freeway, dating back to 1948 when it was part of US 80 and US 395. It has been called one of America's most beautiful parkways.

San Diego's roadway system provides an extensive network of cycle routes. Its dry and mild climate makes cycling a convenient year-round option; however, the city's hilly terrain and long average trip distances make cycling less practicable. Older and denser neighborhoods around the downtown tend to be oriented to utility cycling. This is partly because the grid street patterns are now absent in newer developments farther from the urban core, where suburban-style arterial roads are much more common. As a result, the majority of cycling is recreational.

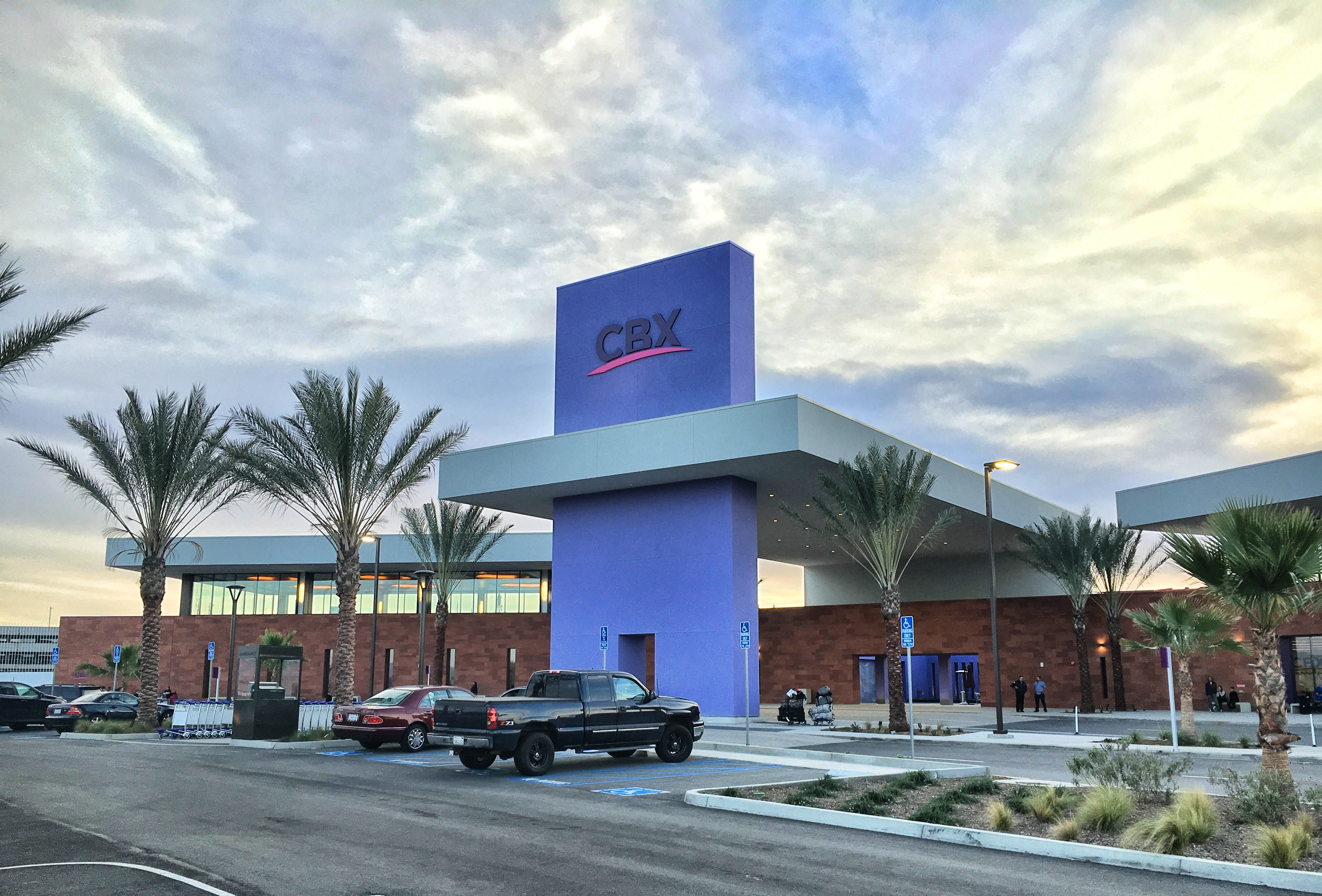
The Cross Border Xpress, also known as the Puerta de las Californias, connects San Diego to Tijuana International Airport in Baja California.

San Diego is served by the San Diego Trolley light rail system, by the MTS bus system, the bus rapid transit system Rapid, private jitneys in some neighborhoods, and by Coaster and Pacific Surfliner commuter rail; northern San Diego County is also served by the Sprinter hybrid rail service. The trolley primarily serves downtown and surrounding urban communities, Mission Valley, east county, and coastal south bay. A mid-coast extension of the trolley operates from Old Town to University City and the University of California, San Diego along Interstate 5 since November 2021. The Amtrak and Coaster trains currently run along the coastline and connect San Diego with Los Angeles, Orange County, Riverside, San Bernardino, and Ventura via Metrolink and the Pacific Surfliner. There are two Amtrak stations in San Diego, in Old Town and Santa Fe Depot downtown. San Diego transit information about public transportation and commuting is available on the Web and by dialing "511" from any phone in the area.

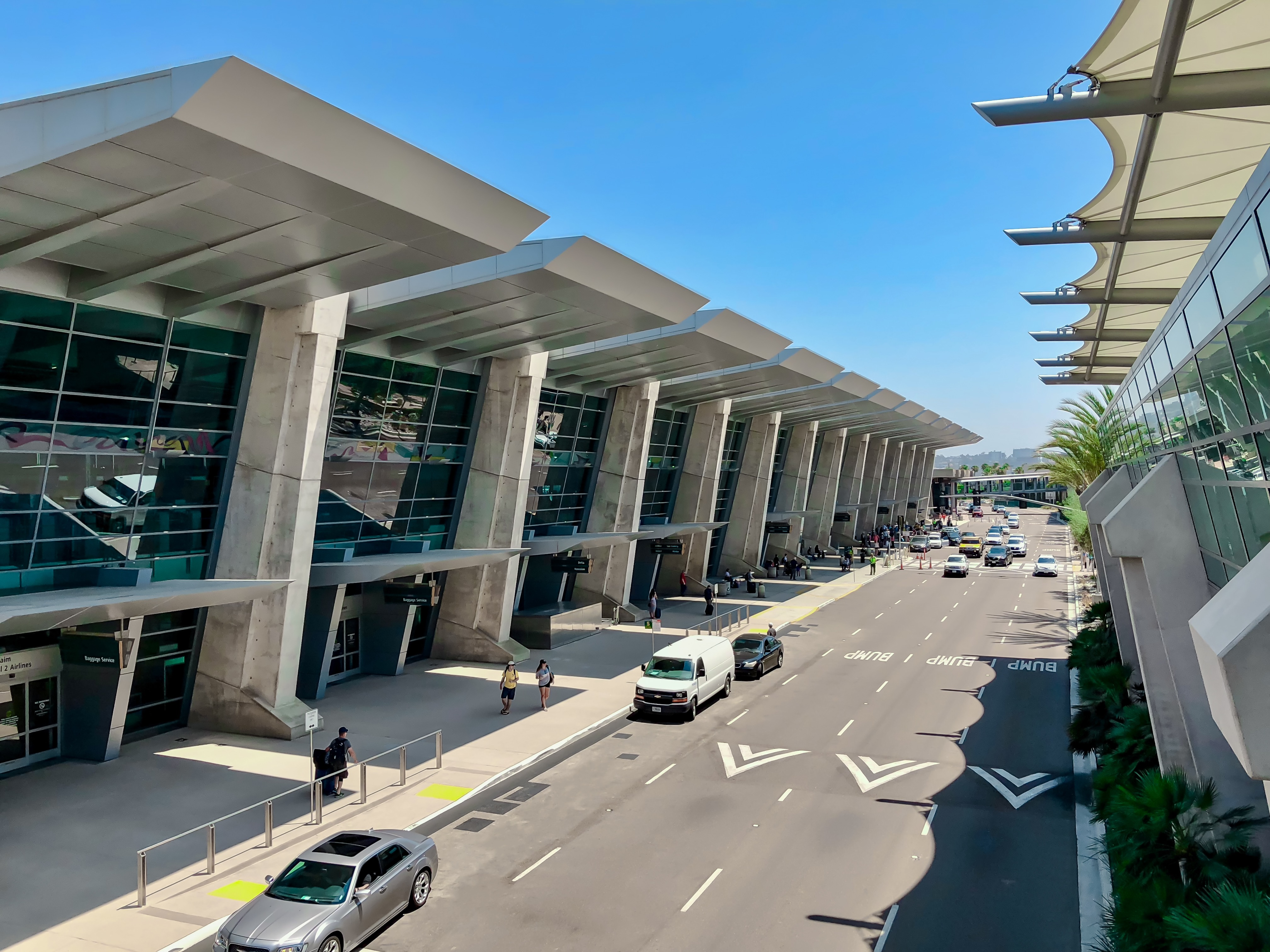
San Diego International Airport

The city has two major commercial airports within or near its city limits. San Diego International Airport is the busiest single-runway airport in the United States. It served over 24 million passengers in 2018 and is dealing with larger numbers every year. Tijuana International Airport has a terminal within the city limits in the Otay Mesa district connected to the rest of the airport in Tijuana, via the Cross Border Xpress cross-border footbridge. In addition, the city has two general-aviation airports, Montgomery-Gibbs Executive Airport and Brown Field Municipal Airport.

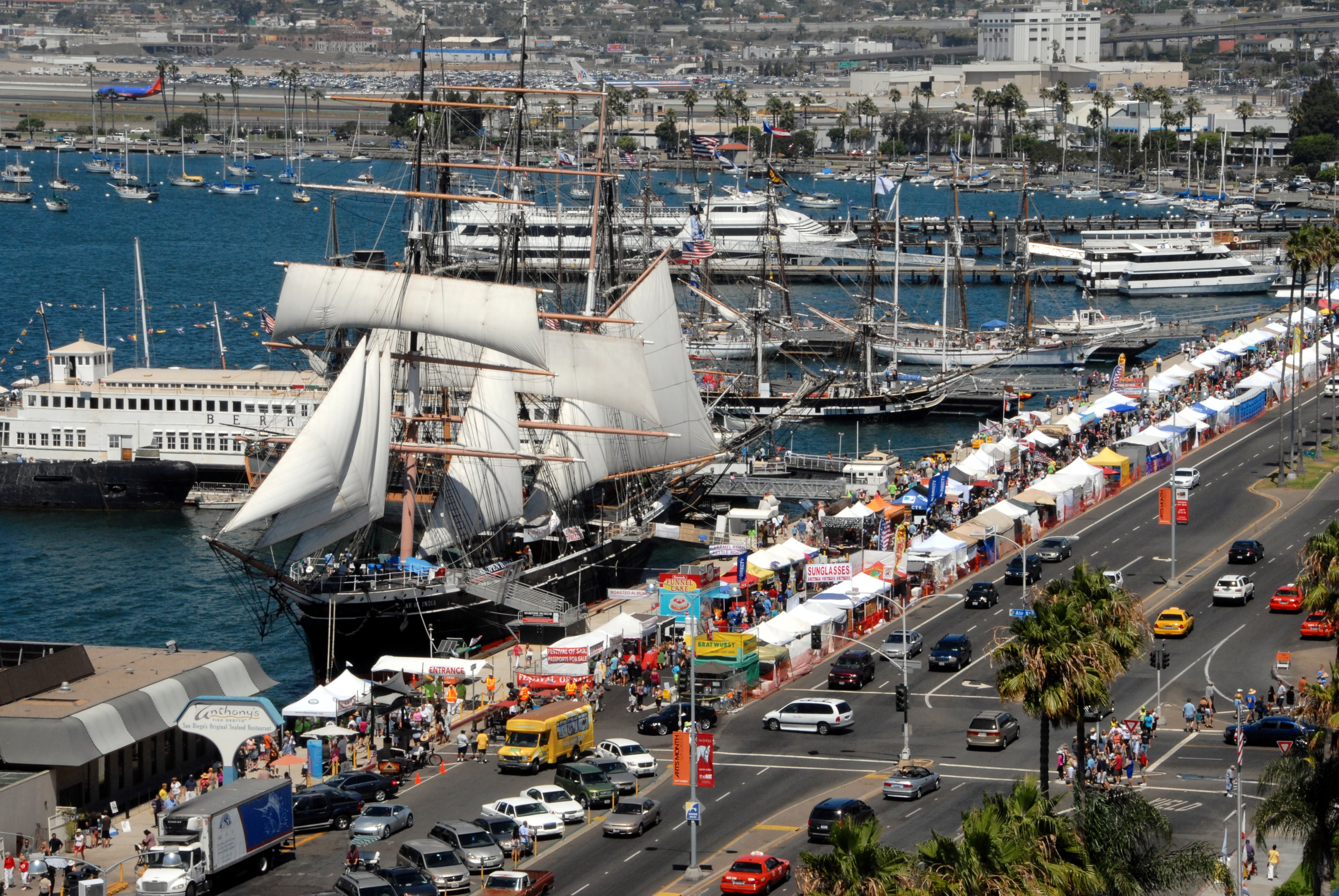
San Diego Bay Festival of Sail

Recent regional transportation projects have sought to mitigate congestion, including improvements to local freeways, expansion of San Diego Airport, and doubling the capacity of the cruise ship terminal. Freeway projects included expansion of Interstates 5 and 805 around "The Merge" where these two freeways meet, as well as expansion of Interstate 15 through North County, which includes new HOV "managed lanes". A tollway (the southern portion of SR 125, known as the South Bay Expressway) connects SR 54 and Otay Mesa, near the Mexican border. According to an assessment in 2007, 37 percent of city streets were in acceptable condition. However, the proposed budget fell $84.6 million short of bringing streets up to an acceptable level. Expansion at the port has included a second cruise terminal on Broadway Pier, opened in 2010. Airport projects include the expansion of Terminal Two.

=== Utilities ===
Water is supplied to residents by the Water Department of the City of San Diego. The city receives most of its water from the Metropolitan Water District of Southern California, which brings water to the region from the Sacramento and San Joaquin rivers, via the state project and the Colorado River, via the Colorado Aqueduct. 80–90% of the water supply is imported.

Gas and electric utilities are provided by San Diego Gas & Electric, a division of Sempra Energy. The company provides energy service to 3.7 million people through 1.5 million electric meters and 900,000 natural gas meters in San Diego and southern Orange counties.

==== Street lights ====
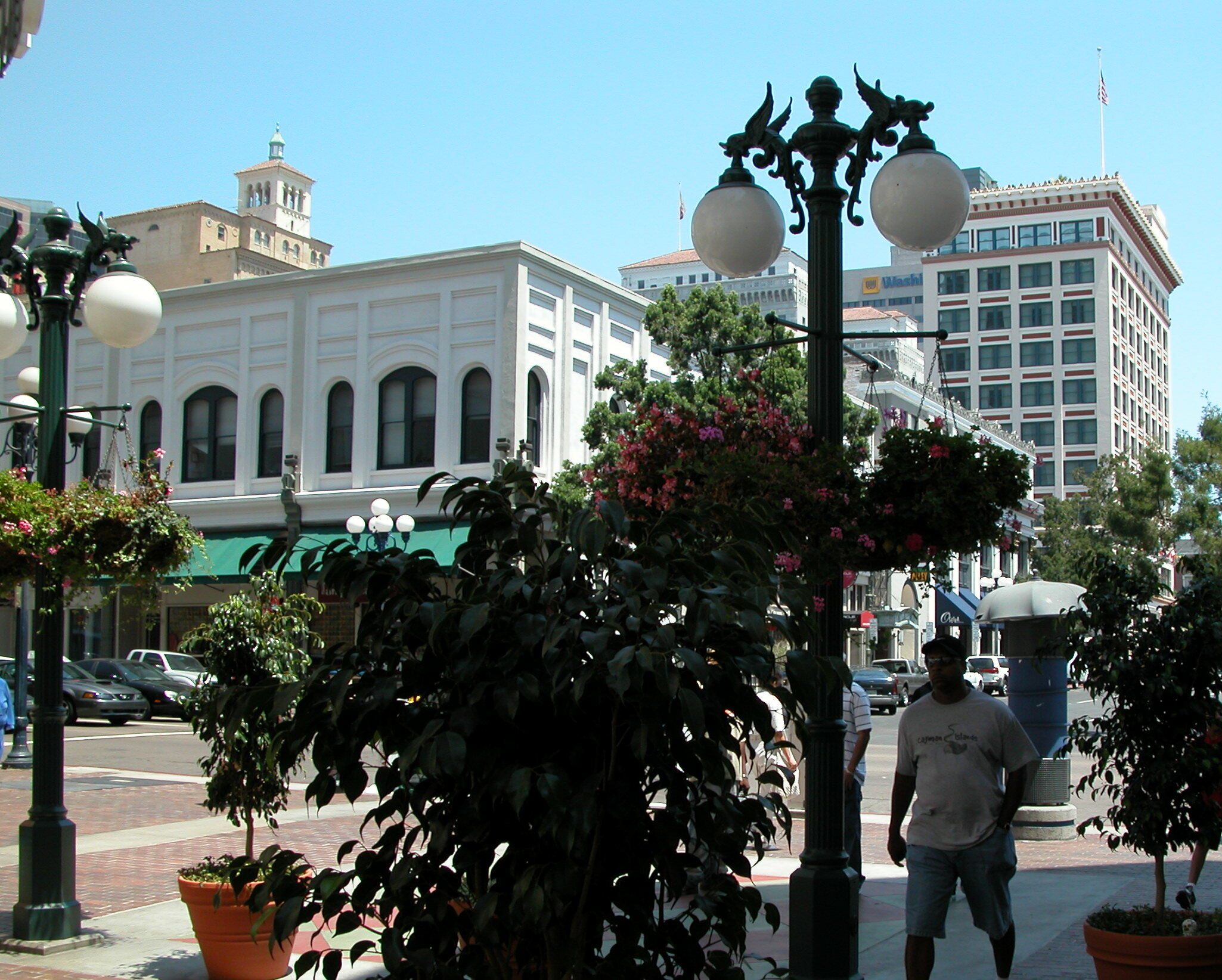
Street lights in the Gaslamp Quarter

In the mid-20th century the city had mercury vapor street lamps. In 1978, the city decided to replace them with more efficient sodium vapor lamps. This triggered an outcry from astronomers at Palomar Observatory 60 miles (100 km) north of the city, concerned that the new lamps would increase light pollution and hinder astronomical observation. The city altered its lighting regulations to limit light pollution within 30 miles (50 km) of Palomar.

In 2011, the city announced plans to upgrade 80% of its street lighting to new energy-efficient lights that use induction technology, a modified form of fluorescent lamp producing a broader spectrum than sodium vapor lamps. The new system is predicted to save $2.2 million per year in energy and maintenance. In 2014, San Diego announced plans to become the first U.S. city to install cyber-controlled street lighting.

== Sister cities ==

San Diego's sister cities are:

- Alcalá de Henares, Spain (est. 1982)
- Campinas, Brazil (est. 1995)
- Cavite City, Philippines (est. 1969)
- Edinburgh, Scotland (est. 1977)
- Jalalabad, Afghanistan (est. 2004)
- Jeonju, South Korea (est. 1983)
- León, Mexico (est. 1969)
- Marseille, France (est. 2025)
- Panama City, Panama (est. 2015)
- Perth, Australia (est. 1986)
- Taichung, Taiwan (est. 1983)
- Tema, Ghana (est. 1976)
- Tijuana, Mexico (est. 1993)
- Vladivostok, Russia (est. 1991)
- Warsaw, Poland (est. 1996)
- Yantai, China (est. 1985)
- Yokohama, Japan (est. 1957)

== See also ==
- Largest cities in Southern California
- List of communities and neighborhoods of San Diego
- List of tallest buildings in San Diego
- List of San Diego Historic Landmarks
- List of people from San Diego
- National Register of Historic Places listings in San Diego County, California
- USS San Diego, 4 ships
