= XEX-TDT =

Canal 5 transmitter on Altzomoni, State of Mexico

Altzomoni, State of Mexico Puebla, Puebla; Mexico
- Channels: Digital: 14 (UHF); Virtual: 5
- Branding: Canal 5

Programming
- Affiliations: Canal 5

Ownership
- Owner: Grupo Televisa; (Radio Televisión, S.A. de C.V.)

History
- First air date: 1955
- Former call signs: XEX-TV (1955-2015)
- Former channel numbers: Analog: 7 (VHF, 1951-85), 8 (VHF, 1985-2015)
- Call sign meaning: Derived from XEW

Technical information
- Licensing authority: CRT
- ERP: (Altzomoni) 236 kW
- Transmitter coordinates: 19°07′10″N 98°39′13″W

XEX-TDT is a television station licensed to and broadcasting from Altzomoni, State of Mexico, on virtual channel 5. In 1951 it started as a relayer of XHTV before joining Canal 5 likely in the early 70s. From 1987 to 1995 it aired a TV Matutina, a separate network, later renamed Supercadena 8, to fill airtime that was reserved in Mexico City for educational television.

XEX, along with Canal 5 transmitter XHTM, serves one of Mexico's largest television service areas with transmitters stretching from Taxco de Alarcón, Guerrero, to Tlaxcala, Tlaxcala, including transmitters in Pachuca, Hidalgo, Cuernavaca, Morelos and San Martín Texmelucan, Puebla. XEX and XHTM's digital transmitter was initially located at Televisa's Puebla transmitter site along with the digital operations of its Altzomoni sister stations and analog and digital signals of Televisa's Puebla independent XHP-TV. In 2015, final digital facilities were built on Altzomoni, coinciding with a power increase from 45 kW to 236.

== History ==
XEX was, alongside stations like XEQ-TV, XELD-TV and the cross-border XETV, among the first Mexican television stations outside of Mexico City. Before establishing a television station, XEX was owned by Rómulo O'Farrill, who was the founder of XHTV (channel 4) in the capital, the first to commence regular operations in Mexico, in 1950. Its license was awarded on November 26, 1951, while regular broadcasts started in 1955 (the same year of the formation of Telesistema Mexicano and broadcast on VHF channel 7, relaying XHTV. At some point XEX replaced the XETV relay with an XHGC one.

The establishment of XHIMT-TV for Imevisión's new Red Nacional 7 network implied a relocation of the VHF frequencies for Mexico City and Altzomoni. XEQ and XHTM exchanged callsigns, with XHTM (channel 8) moving to channel 9 in Mexico City and taking the callsign used by XEQ-TV in Puebla. The station moved to channel 10 and adopted the XHTM callsign, while XEX's callsign remained unchanged, and the station moved from channel 7 (which was to be claimed by XHIMT) to channel 8.

In 1987, XEX and adjacent relay station XHAJ in Las Lajas, Veracruz, began airing a locally-originated network known as TV Matutina (Morning TV), which, despite its name, broadcast into the afternoon. This was possible because XHGC-TV was airing Telesecundaria classes, which were mainly reserved for Mexico City. XEX was also receivable in Mexico City, meaning that Televisa could not broadcast these classes on two transmitters of the same network at the same time, leading to the creation of the morning network. Programming included cartoons, telenovelas and movies, as well as reruns of news bulletins from the previous evening. In 1990, this block was renamed Supercadena 8 and added a late night block. When Televisa reformatted XEQ from a cultural channel into a commercial outlet with a similar format, the block was replaced by home shopping and was completely withdrawn in 1995. After that, the station became a full-time Canal 5 transmitter.

Digital operations for Televisa's Altzomoni stations—XEX, XHTM and XHATZ—were based in Puebla proper until 2015.
