= XHTM-TDT =

Las Estrellas transmitter on Altzomoni, State of Mexico

- Altzomoni, State of Mexico Puebla, Puebla; Mexico
- Channels: Digital: 36 (UHF); Virtual: 2
- Branding: Las Estrellas (The Stars)

Programming
- Affiliations: 2.1 Las Estrellas; 2.2 N+ Foro

Ownership
- Owner: Grupo Televisa; (Televimex, S.A. de C.V.)

History
- First air date: 1952
- Former call signs: XEQ-TV (1952-1985); XHTM-TV (1985-2015)
- Former channel numbers: Analog: 9 (VHF, 1952-85); 10 (VHF, 1985-2015)
- Call sign meaning: From Televisión Independiente de México

Technical information
- Licensing authority: CRT
- ERP: (Altzomoni) 236 kW
- Transmitter coordinates: 19°07′10″N 98°39′13″W

XHTM-TDT is a television station licensed to and broadcasting from Altzomoni, State of Mexico on virtual channel 2. Founded in 1952, it was the second television station built outside of Mexico City and the first relayer of Las Estrellas.

XHTM, along with Canal 5 transmitter XEX, serves one of Mexico's largest television service areas with a string of transmitters stretching from Taxco de Alarcón, Guerrero to Tlaxcala, Tlaxcala, including transmitters in Pachuca, Hidalgo, Cuernavaca, Morelos and San Martín Texmelucan, Puebla. XHTM's digital transmitter was initially located at Televisa's Puebla transmitter site along with the digital operations of its Altzomoni sister stations and both analog and digital signals of Televisa's Puebla independent XHP-TV; in 2015, final digital facilities were built on Altzomoni, coinciding with a power increase from 45 kW to 236.

== History ==
XHTM channel 10 started life with a different callsign and channel number. In late 1952, XEQ-TV channel 9 took to the air; owned by Emilio Azcárraga and bearing the callsign of his XEQ AM radio in Mexico City, it was the second television station outside of the nation's capital (preceded only by XELD-TV in Matamoros) and the nation's fourth. The original concessionaire was Radio Panamericana, S.A., making it a direct sister station to XEQ radio. The transmission from Paso de Cortés (Cortez Pass), 13,405 feet (4,086 m) high, was said to make channel 9 the world's highest television station. The sign-on of XEQ-TV was the first step in the development of a national relay network, reaching an additional three million people. Not long after, Romulo O'Farrill built his own relay station on the mountain, XEX-TV. The establishment of XEQ thus led to Televisa's massive system of relay stations covering most of Mexico.

In 1985, XEX-TV and XEQ-TV were affected by a series of moves that added a VHF channel to the Mexico City area. Mexico City had channel 8, then known as XHTM-TV. XHTM moved to channel 9, taking on the XEQ-TV callsign. A new television station was placed on channel 7, Imevisión's XHIMT-TV. To accomplish this move, XEX-TV was relocated to channel 8 and XEQ-TV to channel 10, picking up the XHTM callsign discarded in Mexico City.

In 1994, XEX and XHTM were joined on the mountain by a third Televisa station, XHATZ-TV (channel 32), as part of a 62-station concession used to help take XEQ-TV's signal national.

Digital operations for Televisa's Altzomoni stations—XEX, XHTM and XHATZ—were based in Puebla proper until 2015.

== Repeaters ==
XHTM operates one of Mexico's most extensive networks of repeaters:

RF	Location	ERP
36	Ixtapan de la Sal	.700 kW
36	Tejupilco de Hidalgo	20 kW
36	Tonatico	.700 kW
36	Taxco, Gro.	21 kW
39	Pachuca, Hgo.	8 kW
36	Cuernavaca, Mor.	45 kW
17	Ciudad Serdán, Pue.	0.096 kW
36	Huaquechula, Pue.	2 kW
36	San Martín Alchichica, Pue.	2 kW
36	San Martín Texmelucan, Pue.	20 kW
36	Tlaxcala, Tlax.	30 kW
