= XHGC-TDT =

Television station in Mexico City

- Mexico City; Mexico
- Channels: Digital: 31 (UHF); Virtual: 5
- Branding: Canal 5

Programming
- Affiliations: Canal 5

Ownership
- Owner: Grupo Televisa; (Radio Televisión, S.A. de C.V.)
- Sister stations: XEW-TDT, XHTV-TDT, XEQ-TDT

History
- First air date: May 10, 1952
- Former call signs: XHGC-TV (1952-2015)
- Former channel numbers: Analog: 5 (VHF, 1952–2015); Digital: 50 (UHF, 2005–2017)
- Call sign meaning: Guillermo González Camarena (founder)

Technical information
- Licensing authority: CRT
- ERP: 270 kW
- HAAT: 612.7 m (2,010 ft)
- Transmitter coordinates: 19°35′22.50″N 99°06′55.54″W

Links
- Website: www.televisa.com/canal5

XHGC-TDT (channel 5) is a television station in Mexico City, Mexico. Owned and operated by Grupo Televisa, it is the flagship of the Canal 5 network.

== History ==
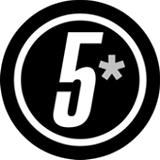
Logo used from 2000 to 2006

XHGC was one of the first television stations in Mexico to receive a license, having received a concession by August 1950. During 1951, the station conducted test transmissions, mostly for color tests, using a system he developed similar to the one devised by CBS.

XHGC signed on May 10, 1952, broadcasting a Mother's Day event organized by the Excélsior newspaper, but regular programming began on September 18, 1952. The station was established by Guillermo González Camarena, a Mexican engineer who was one of the inventors of modern color television; the station's calls reflect his surnames. González Camarena was director and general manager of XHGC until his death in 1965, and XHGC's concessionaire remained Televisión González Camarena, S.A., until November 30, 1994.

In 1954, XHGC was one of the first stations in the world to broadcast an early version of 3D television, in which two of the same picture appear side by side on the screen, combined into a single 3-dimensional image using special glasses. This version of 3D television was developed by an American inventor, James Butterfield, and tested in Mexico on XHGC. Around this time, the station started receiving financing from Othon Vélez, close aide of Telesistema Mexicano, in order to sustain itself, causing a rapprochement with XEW-TV, which operated as Televimex. The station became a part of the TSM conglomerate on March 26, 1955. Even with the agreement, XHGC continued being managed separately, but was close to channels 2 and 4.

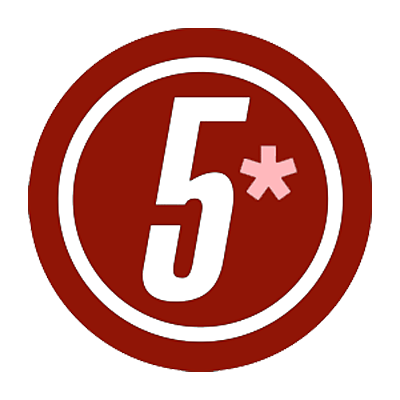
Logo used from 2007 to 2013

In 1963, XHGC became the first station in Mexico to broadcast in color. By request of Guillermo González Camarena, XHGC became oriented at an audience of children and youth. The first color program broadcast was Paraíso infantil (Children's Paradise). Mexico was also likely the third country in North America and the fourth in the world, behind the United States, Cuba, and Japan, to introduce color television.

In the 1960s, XHGC also brought educational television to Mexico City viewers, with Telesecundaria, a pioneering educational program operated by the Secretary of Public Education. This was first conceived by González Camarena himself in 1965, and started in 1968.

At the end of the 1980s, the then-vice president of Televisa, Alejandro Burillo Azcárraga, spearheaded drastic changes in the branding of the company's television networks. While XHGC had branded as Canal 5 for years, using various logos with the number 5. However, as the network's various repeaters were not all on channel 5, the network began branding by the XHGC callsign. The landmark Energía Visual (Visual Energy) campaign, designed by Agustín Corona and Pablo Jato, featured idents with wildly varied logos and designs—a first for Mexican television. The campaign was designed to back the channel's youthful image.

The late 1980s also saw a unique split between XHGC and XEX-TV on Altzomoni, the other Canal 5 station receivable in Mexico City. The network began its broadcast day at 7 am in Mexico City, but at 4 pm in the rest of Mexico. The daytime hours on XEX (and some other Canal 5 repeaters) were filled by "TV Matutina" (later known as "Supercadena 8" or Super Channel 8), which offered repeats of Canal 5 and other Televisa programs.

In the 1990s, Canal 5 began branding with its channel number again. During this time period, Alejandro González Iñárritu, who had also been involved with Televisa's radio station XEW-FM (WFM), was involved in the creation of some of the network's promotional campaigns.

1999 saw the beginning of a shift in content providers for Canal 5, which had long been the exclusive Mexican rights holder to Disney programs such as Chip 'n Dale Rescue Rangers, DuckTales and a Mexican version of Disney Club. In 1999, these rights began to migrate to Televisión Azteca and Azteca 7. Instead, the network began relying more on WB, Cartoon Network, Fox, and Nickelodeon programs.

Today, Canal 5 carries children's programs, films and international series, as well as sporting events including UEFA Champions League, UEFA Europa League and FIFA World Cup matches, a limited number of Liga MX fixtures and international matches involving the Mexico national team, and select NFL games. Canal 5 also features some of Televisa's own productions, such as El Chavo Animado and Mujeres Asesinas 3 by Pedro Torres.

In 2018, the concessions of all Canal 5 stations, including XHGC, were consolidated in the concessionaire Radio Televisión, S.A. de C.V., as part of a corporate reorganization of Televisa's concessionaires.

== Technical information ==
=== Subchannel ===
Subchannel of XHGC-TDT
Subchannel	Res.	Short name	Programming
5.1	1080i	XHGC	Canal 5

=== Analog-to-digital conversion ===
XHGC applied for a digital channel in September 2005 and received channel 50. In 2015, it was authorized to increase power on its digital channel, from 80 to 300 kW.

XHGC-TV shut off its analog signal, on VHF channel 5, on December 17, 2015, at 12:00 a.m., as part of the federally mandated transition from analog to digital television.

In 2016, in order to facilitate the repacking of TV services out of the 600 MHz band (channels 38–51), XHGC was allowed to move from channel 50 to channel 31. The change occurred in April 2017, including a brief period in which both facilities operated at the same time.

=== Repeaters ===
Aside from the Canal 5 network, XHGC maintains two of its own repeaters that account for terrain masking and gaps in coverage within the licensed coverage area:

RF	Location	ERP
31	Col. El Tenayo/Tlalnepantla, State of Mexico	.04 kW
31	Col. Ticomán, Mexico City	0.06 kW
31	Ixtapaluca, Mex.	0.826 kW
