= Azteca 7 =

Mexican national TV network

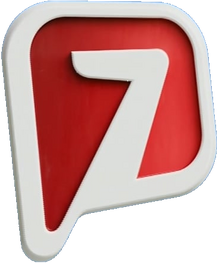
- Logo used since 2024
- Type: Terrestrial television network
- Country: Mexico
- Transmitters: see below
- Headquarters: Mexico City

Programming
- Language: Spanish
- Picture format: 1080i HDTV

Ownership
- Owner: TV Azteca
- Sister channels: Azteca Uno; ADN Noticias; A Más

History
- Launched: May 18, 1985
- Former names: Canal 7 (1985–1993); Tu Vision Canal Siete (1993–1994); TV7 (1994–1998); Azteca Siete (1998–2011); Azteca 24 HD (digital feed, 2006–2008)

Links
- Website: www.tvazteca.com/azteca7/index

Availability

Terrestrial
- Digital terrestrial television (except Tijuana, Mexicali and Ciudad Juárez): Channel 7
- Digital terrestrial television (Mexicali and Ciudad Juárez): Channel 20
- Digital terrestrial television (Tijuana): Channel 21

Azteca 7 (also called El Siete) is a Mexican network owned by TV Azteca, with more than 100 main transmitters all over Mexico.

Azteca 7 is available on all cable and satellite systems. Azteca 7 broadcasts entertainment series, movies, and sporting events targeting a general audience, and programs for children during the daytime. In programming, its main national competitor in open television has historically been Canal 5 of TelevisaUnivision.

== History ==
=== Imevisión's channel 7 ===
To bring a channel 7 to Mexico City, which had channels 2, 4, 5, 8, 11 and 13, a channel shuffle had to be made. This channel shuffle converted Televisa's station XHTM-TV channel 8 to channel 9. Two Puebla stations, XEX-TV channel 7 and XEQ-TV channel 9, moved to channels 8 and 10; XEQ took on the XHTM callsign that was discontinued in Mexico City. In Toluca, channel 7 (XHGEM-TV) was moved to channel 12, and XHTOL-TV moved from channel 9 to 10. XHIMT-TV took to the air on 15 May 1985, as the third of three Mexico City stations operated by public broadcaster Imevisión, sister to XHDF-TV channel 13 and XEIMT-TV channel 22, and the flagship station of a second Imevisión national network which featured 99 repeater stations, larger than any commercial network of the time, serving 72% of the population. The new Red Nacional 7 (7 National Network) was positioned as targeting the working class and rural areas, whose programming would reflect "the national identity", while Red Nacional 13, based from XHDF, targeted a more middle- and upper-class audience. Because the new network lacked its own building, initial operating costs were estimated to be of over US$1 million. Initial programming included educational programs during daytime hours, primetime entertainment and news updates every 30 minutes.

=== TV Azteca's channel 7 ===
However, financial mismanagement, economic troubles and other issues quickly signaled trouble for Imevisión. The network had become a mere frequency with a limited transmitter farm, with seven hours of its programming on weekdays in 1990 (half of its weekday airtime) was still dedicated to high school educational programming (Telesecundaria). There were even talks of Multivisión owner Joaquín Vargas buying the network. In 1990, XEIMT and XHIMT were converted into relays of XHDF, and the next year, the government of Mexico announced it was selling XHIMT and XHDF to the private sector. The sale of these two networks in 1993 formed the new TV Azteca network.

On 15 October 1993, XHIMT was operating independently under Azteca as Tú Visión. The programming of Azteca 7 since then has largely consisted of children's programs, sports, foreign series and movies, serving as a competitor to Televisa's Canal 5.

On 21 January 1999, The children's programming block Disney Club premiered on 10 February. Produced by TV Azteca, will broadcast the new animated series in this country for the first time Recess, Pepper Ann, Timon & Pumbaa, 101 Dalmatians: The Series, as well as cartoons Doug, Chip 'n Dale: Rescue Rangers and Goof Troop, after acquiring the rights previously held by Televisa in 1997, the program became a milestone in Mexican television for the millennial generation.

In September 2013, the network was added to Dish México.

On 12 July 2018, TV Azteca and Turner formed a partnership to broadcast Cartoon Network programs at the following schedule: Ben 10, The Powerpuff Girls, The Amazing World of Gumball and We Bare Bears.

On 17 July 2022, Azteca 7 officially announced the acquisition and premiere of the legendary series Dragon Ball Z on 1 August, moving on from its historic run on Televisa's Canal 5.

== Programming ==
=== Sports ===
After its privatization, Azteca 7 began carrying NBA basketball, though Televisa now holds these rights. Soccer rights on Azteca 7 include the Liga MX, as well as all official and friendly matches of the Mexico national soccer team. Azteca 7 also carries NFL games, boxing (Box Azteca) and lucha libre (Lucha Azteca).

== Transmitters ==
Azteca 7 has 89 full-power transmitters that broadcast its programming; it also is carried, albeit in SD, as a subchannel of 14 additional Azteca Uno transmitters. Except in the border cities of Tijuana, Mexicali and Ciudad Juárez, Azteca 7 is exclusively mapped to virtual channel 7 nationwide.

RF	VC	Call sign	Location	ERP
29	7	XHLGA-TDT	Aguascalientes, Ags.	15.91 kW
38	7	XHCVO-TDT	Calvillo, Ags.	4.23 kW
20	7	XHENT-TDT	Ensenada, BC	29.14 kW
23	7	XHIDC-TDT	Isla de Cedros, BC	0.94 kW
21	7	XHFEC-TDT	San Felipe, BC	1.798 kW
25	20	XHEXT-TDT	Mexicali, BC	66.22 kW
29	21	XHTIT-TDT	Tijuana, BC	148.08 kW
27	7	XHBAB-TDT	Bahía Asunción, BCS	1.06 kW
21	7	XHBTB-TDT	Bahía Tortugas, BCS	0.92 kW
26	7	XHSJC-TDT	San José del Cabo, BCS	13.5 kW
27	7	XHCCB-TDT	Cd. Constitución, BCS	7.29 kW
24	7	XHGNB-TDT	Guerrero Negro, BCS	0.89 kW
25	7	XHPBC-TDT	La Paz, BCS	29.63 kW
22	7	XHSIB-TDT	San Ignacio, BCS	1.08 kW
21	7	XHSIS-TDT	San Isidro, BCS	0.92 kW
24	7	XHSRB-TDT	Santa Rosalía, BCS	1.13 kW
24	7	XHCAM-TDT	Campeche, Camp.	20.46 kW
31	7	XHCCT-TDT	Ciudad del Carmen, Camp.	8.2 kW
27	7	XHECA-TDT	Escárcega, Camp.	7.27 kW
36	20	XHCJH-TDT	Cd. Juárez, Chih.	52 kW
21	7	XHECH-TDT	Chihuahua, Chih.	44.43 kW
21	7	XHECH-TDT	Delicias, Chih.	44.43 kW
21	7	XHJCH-TDT	Jimenez, Chih.	1.3 kW
22	7	XHHDP-TDT	Hidalgo del Parral, Chih.	9.03 kW
24	7	XHCGC-TDT	Nuevo Casas Grandes, Chihuahua	1.014 kW
16	7	XHHR-TDT	Ojinaga, Chihuahua	
30	7	XHCOM-TDT	Comitán de Dominguez, Chis.	4.55 kW
25	7	XHMCH-TDT	Motozintla, Chis.	5.35 kW
39	7	XHCSA-TDT	San Cristóbal de las Casas, Chis. Tuxtla Gutiérrez	46.29 kW; 58.47 kW
36	7	XHJU-TDT	Tapachula, Chis.	51.08 kW
30	7	XHTON-TDT	Tonalá, Chis.	4.21 kW
42	7	XHSBC-TDT	Nueva Rosita, Coah.	9.04 kW
27	7	XHMLA-TDT	Monclova, Coah.	11.66 kW
28	7	XHPFE-TDT	Parras de la Fuente, Coah.	10.93 kW
32	7	XHPNG-TDT	Piedras Negras, Coah.	16.33 kW
33	7	XHLLO-TDT	Saltillo, Coah.	8.74 kW
43	7	XHGZP-TDT	Torreón, Coah.	187.38 kW
40	7	XHCOL-TDT	Colima, Col.	24.25 kW
39	7	XHNCI-TDT	Manzanillo, Col.	10.12 kW
50	7	XHTCO-TDT	Tecomán, Col.	4.29 kW
24	7	XHIMT-TDT	Mexico City	464.42 kW
22	7	XHVEL-TDT	Cuencame, Durango	1.014 kW
32	7	XHDRG-TDT	Durango, Dgo.	12.7 kW
25	7	XHSPC-TDT	San Pedro, Dgo.	5.09 kW
41	7	XHCCG-TDT	Celaya, Gto.	99.33 kW
45	7	XHACC-TDT	Acapulco, Gro.	36.6 kW
28	7	XHCHL-TDT	Chilpancingo, Gro.	17.58 kW
44	7	XHTUX-TDT	Iguala, Gro.	6.16 kW
25	7	XHIXZ-TDT	Zihuatanejo, Gro.	42.59 kW
36	7	XHPHG-TDT	Pachuca, Hgo.	3.97 kW
24	7	XHTGN-TDT	Tulancingo, Hidalgo	
23	7	XHAFC-TDT	San Nicolas Jacala/ Agua Fria Chica, Hgo.	1.07 kW
31	7	XHSFJ-TDT	Guadalajara, Jal.	109.44 kW
23	7	XHPVJ-TDT	Puerto Vallarta, Jal.	18.42 kW
35	7	XHLUC-TDT	Toluca/Jocotitlán, Mex.	92.02 kW
24	1.2	XHCBM-TDT	Pátzcuaro, Mich. (Cerro Burro)	64.42 kW
32	7	XHBUR-TDT	Morelia, Mich.	257.89 kW
23	7	XHRAM-TDT	Zamora, Mich.	30.85 kW
46	7	XHTCM-TDT	Zitácuaro, Mich.	16.21 kW
43	7	XHCUV-TDT	Cuernavaca, Mor.	238.21 kW
31	7	XHLBN-TDT	Tepic, Nay.	23.970 kW
17	7	XHFN-TDT	Monterrey, NL	342.070 kW
29	7	XHHDL-TDT	Huajuapan de León, Oax.	5.37 kW
30	7	XHPSO-TDT	Matías Romero, Oax. (Cerro Palma Sola)	47.63 kW
27	7	XHDG-TDT	Oaxaca, Oax.	57.91 kW
24	7	XHINC-TDT	Pinotepa Nacional, Oax.	
24	7	XHCGC-TDT	Nuevo Casas Grandes, Chihuahua	1.014 kW
33	1.2	XHPCE-TDT	Puerto Escondido, Oax.	
23	7	XHJP-TDT	Puerto Escondido, Oax.	8.39 kW
48	7	XHSMT-TDT	San Miguel Tlacotepec, Oax.	1.09 kW
27	7	XHTEM-TDT	Puebla, Pue.	53.32 kW
40	7	XHTHP-TDT	Tehuacán, Pue.	17.08 kW
34	7	XHQUE-TDT	Querétaro, Qro.	298.85 kW
28	7	XHCCQ-TDT	Cancún, Q. Roo	38.74 kW
26	7	XHCQO-TDT	Chetumal, Q. Roo	8.52 kW
25	7	XHPVC-TDT	Felipe Carrillo, Q. Roo	
27	7	XHKD-TDT	Ciudad Valles, SLP; Ciudad Mante, Tamp.	
22	7	XHCDI-TDT	Matehuala, SLP	4.48 kW
22	7	XHCLP-TDT	San Luis Potosí, SLP	44.39 kW
35	7	XHDO-TDT	Culiacán, Sin.	36.52 kW
31	7	XHMIS-TDT	Los Mochis, Sin.	45.21 kW
31	7	XHDL-TDT	Mazatlán, Sin.	38.52 kW
25	7	XHCAN-TDT	Cananea, Son.	5.11 kW
35	7	XHBK-TDT	Cd. Obregón, Son.	45.75 kW
30	7	XHHO-TDT	Hermosillo, Son.	39.43 kW
24	7	XHNOA-TDT	Nogales, Son.	76.82 kW
21	7	XHPPS-TDT	Puerto Peñasco, Son.	1.82 kW
33	7	XHLAV-TDT	La Venta, Tab.	.97 kW
41	7	XHVIH-TDT	Villahermosa, Tab.	18.88 kW
29	7	XHCDT-TDT	Cd. Victoria, Tamps.	16.92 kW
33	7	XHOR-TDT	Matamoros, Tamps. Reynosa, Tamps.	116.96 kW; 61.447 kW
33	7	XHLAT-TDT	Nuevo Laredo, Tamps.	119 kW
21	7	XHTAU-TDT	Tampico, Tamps.	30.54 kW
45	7	XHCTZ-TDT	Coatzacoalcos, Ver.	50.4 kW
33	7	XHCPE-TDT	Cofre de Perote, Ver.	239.16 kW
32	7	XHSTE-TDT	Santiago Tuxtla	15.18 kW
33	7	XHMEY-TDT	Mérida, Yuc.	97.708 kW
24	7	XHVAD-TDT	Valladolid/Kahua, Yuc.	4.75 kW
48	7	XHIV-TDT	Zacatecas, Zac.	40.76 kW

== Network logos ==
1985-1990

1991-1993

1993-1994

June-November 1994

1994-1998

1998-2007

2007-2011

2011-2014

2014-2015

2015-2016

2016-2024

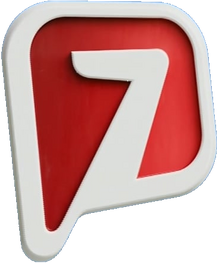
2024-present
