= Imevisión =

Former Mexican state broadcaster

Instituto Mexicano de la Televisión
- Trade name: Imevisión
- Company type: State-owned corporation
- Predecessor: Televisión de la República Mexicana
- Founded: 23 March 1983; 43 years ago
- Defunct: 2 August 1993; 32 years ago
- Fate: Licenses for the channels, except channel 22 liquidated to Televisión Azteca
- Headquarters: Mexico City, Mexico
- Services: Television
- Owner: Mexican Federal government

The Instituto Mexicano de la Televisión (Mexican Television Institute), known commercially as Imevisión after 1985, was a state broadcaster and federal government agency of Mexico. At its height, Imevisión programmed two national networks and additional local stations in Mexico City, Chihuahua, Ciudad Juárez, Guadalajara, Mexicali, Tijuana and Monterrey.

As the Mexican government moved toward privatization, and in light of financial sustainability issues, most of Imevisión was sold in 1992 to Grupo Salinas, which came to be known as Televisión Azteca. The government retained one of Imevisión's local stations, in Mexico City, and converted it into a cultural channel under the auspices of Conaculta.

== History ==
=== 1972–83: The government getting into television ===
On March 15, 1972, the federal government expropriated the assets of Mexico City television station XHDF-TV, channel 13, as payment for debts the station held to state financier SOMEX. This marked the first direct entry of the Mexican state into the business of public television. In 1976, the government built new facilities for XHDF in Ajusco, south of Mexico City.

In April 1972, the Mexican government embarked on another television project, the creation of Televisión Rural Mexicana (Mexican Rural Television). TRM was a new television system with low-power repeaters placed across Mexico, initially 80 and ultimately numbering 110 by 1976. TRM had received station allocations as early as 1969, for a batch of about 35 stations. In 1981, Televisión Rural Mexicana became Televisión de la República Mexicana (Television of the Mexican Republic), and on April 15, 1982, TRM placed a television station on the air in Mexico City: XHTRM-TV, channel 22. XHTRM was the first UHF television station in the Mexico City area.

On March 23, 1983, the Mexican government created three new federal corporations for mass media: IMER (Instituto Mexicano de la Radio) for radio, IMCINE (Film Institute of Mexico) for film, and the Instituto Mexicano de la Televisión (Mexican Television Institute, or IMT), for television nationwide. IMT combined the existing television assets of the state, including channels 13 and 22 and their associated repeater networks nationwide. XHTRM-TV changed call signs to XEIMT-TV to correspond with the new ownership.

=== 1983–89: Building a competitor ===
IMT promptly set out to further expand its broadcasting holdings. In 1985, two important events in the history of the institute took place. IMT picked up the name Imevisión as its commercial identity, including a refined logo and branding.

That same year, on May 15, it signed on a new television station in Mexico City, XHIMT-TV channel 7. To give Mexico City an additional VHF channel, a frequency shuffle ensued between the Televisa channel 8 in Mexico City and two Televisa stations transmitting from Altzomoni, whose signals were targeted toward Puebla. As a result, the existing channel 8 in Mexico City, XHTM-TV, moved to channel 9 and became XEQ-TV. At the same time, XEX-TV channel 7 in Puebla relocated to channel 8, and XEQ-TV channel 9 in Puebla moved to channel 10 and took on the XHTM-TV callsign.

The old TRM repeater network, still linked to channel 22, was shifted to rebroadcast channel 7, whose programming was geared toward a working-class audience in contrast to that of channel 13. Imevisión thus reached its zenith; it now controlled two national television networks, known as Red Nacional 13 (13 National Network, initially with 44 repeaters) and Red Nacional 7 (7 National Network, with 99 repeaters), as well as being the owner and operator of the following local television stations:

- XHFN-TV, channel 8 in Monterrey;
- XHSFJ-TV, canal 11 in Guadalajara;
- XHJK-TV, canal 27 in Tijuana
- XHAQ-TV, canal 5 in Mexicali
- XHCH-TV, channel 2 in Chihuahua, and its satellite station, XHCJE-TV, channel 11 in Ciudad Juárez (which signed on in 1980);
- XEIMT-TV, channel 22 in Mexico City

Each of these stations drew from Imevisión's programming but had many of their local programs. XHFN, which in 1974 had taken to the air broadcasting secondary education telecourses, had a local newscast known as Telenoticias. XHCH carried two local newscasts, one for the municipality and one with a regional aim. XEIMT was dedicated to movies and was known as Cine Canal 22.

There were also local opt-outs on Imevisión stations in certain areas, often from producers owned by the state governments. Many of these, inherited from the TRM days, sowed the seeds for the eventual establishment of state-owned television networks in states such as Chiapas, Guanajuato and San Luis Potosí. While many were displaced after the privatization of Imevisión, a few remain active public TV channels.

The Imevision network was the only national channel that remained on the air moments after the 1985 Mexico City earthquake interrupted broadcasts of Televisa, which has studios and offices in the capital. It was also the first to air live videos of the damages in the capital city and around the country.

On a national level, Imevisión began building itself into a competitor to Televisa, which dominated Mexican television. Imevisión's newscasts were recognized as being more impartial than those of Televisa, and while total ratings share was very low, its programs attracted decent ratings (but had an uphill climb securing the same national advertisers as Televisa). When the Mexican Football Federation broke Televisa's decades-old monopoly on national soccer in 1990, Imevisión was the big winner, broadcasting several times more games than Televisa in the 1991–92 season. Additionally, Imevisión and Televisa competed in coverage of the 1992 Summer Olympics, as well as covering the World Cup and Formula One racing. Imevisión had 5,000 employees. From 1986 to 1992, it became responsible for the production of the television broadcast of the Mexico Grand Prix. Imevisión largely produced documentary output to counter Televisa, which was seen by the network as serving North American interests, however it started airing more foreign commercial fare such as American series Moonlighting and Brazilian telenovelas, which were against the plans made for a network with a unique Mexican identity. By the late 1980s, Imevisión was already exporting telenovelas to the United States, with one such outlet being KBUENAvisión, a local cable station on the Comcast head-end in Orange County.

However, at the same time, embezzlement and inconsistent management dogged Imevisión. In September 1990, Imevisión consolidated its national networks into one, with Mexico City channels 7 and 22 relaying channel 13, in an attempt to mount a stronger challenge to Televisa. The National Network 13's affiliates and retransmitter channels grew when the National Network 7 channels were merged with its local stations at the same time.

=== 1989–93: Dismantling and privatization of the company ===
In December 1990, the government announced its plan to split off channels 7 and 22 from the Imevisión system and keep only channel 13; as such, channels 7 and 22 began to simulcast XHDF directly. This sparked concern among actors in Mexico's cultural sphere, who wanted to see one of the stations reserved to become a station centered around cultural programming. On January 26, 1991, they wrote a letter to President Carlos Salinas de Gortari, asking that one of the stations be reserved for a new cultural television entity. Salinas responded the next month, agreeing with their proposal. Channel 22 was chosen for this project, and it went off the air late in 1991. On June 23, 1993, XEIMT returned to the air from a more powerful transmitter located on Cerro del Chiquihuite, under the auspices of Conaculta and with its new cultural format.

In 1991, the first auction was held in an attempt to privatize the remainder of Imevisión; meeting with few bidders, the auction was declared void.

To sell most of the Imevisión stations, a legal hurdle had to be resolved. Many of the stations, especially those that relayed XHIMT, operated under non-commercial licenses, known as permits (permisos) in Mexican parlance. These had to be converted into commercial licenses, or concessions, to allow their sale, with the concessionaires being a series of state-owned businesses, the largest of which was called Televisión Azteca. Eventually, two national networks were put on the auction block: a network headed by XHDF, with 90 repeaters, and a network led by XHIMT, with 78. The latter network was sold in regional blocks. In addition, separate transmissions were intermittently mounted for XHIMT, breaking from XHDF. Four proposals were received for the auction.

On July 18, 1993, the winner was announced: Radio Televisión del Centro, a group headed by Ricardo Salinas Pliego, owner of the Elektra electronics chain. The final bid came in at US$650 million ($1.45 billion in 2025 dollars), and the networks adopted the Televisión Azteca name. Channels 7 and 13 had adopted the Televisión Azteca name in April, before the sale. As a private business, Azteca began operations on August 2, 1993, and on October 15, channels 7 and 13 were split; Tu Visión was the new branding for channel 7, while channel 13 broadcast under the name Mi Tele.
