= XELD-TV =

Television station in Matamoros, Tamaulipas (1951–1954)

Coordinates: 25.901007°N 97.499308°W

- Matamoros, Tamaulipas; Mexico
- Channels: Analog: 7 (VHF)

Programming
- Languages: English; Spanish
- Affiliations: Defunct

Ownership
- Owner: Romulo O'Farrill/Emilio Azcárraga; (Televisión de Matamoros, S.A.)

History
- First air date: September 15, 1951
- Last air date: April 29, 1954 (2 years, 226 days)
- Former affiliations: CBS (primary); ABC, DuMont, NBC (secondary)

Technical information
- Licensing authority: SCT
- ERP: 2.8 kW

XELD-TV (channel 7) was a television station located in Matamoros, Tamaulipas, Mexico, whose over-the-air signal also covered the Rio Grande Valley across the international border in the United States. The station broadcast in English and Spanish from September 15, 1951, to April 29, 1954.

== History ==
=== Opening ===
The 1948 freeze on new television station licenses placed by the Federal Communications Commission (FCC) in the United States stalled any development of television on the American side of the Río Grande, which was allotted VHF channels 4 and 5. Meanwhile, per international agreement, Matamoros had received the allotments for channels 2, 7, and 11, along with channel 9 in Reynosa (which also received channel 12 in 1952).

Meanwhile, channel 7 in Matamoros was being built out by XESE-TV. XESE was owned by Compañía Mexicana de Televisión, S.A., whose owner, Manuel D. Leal, was vice president and general manager of KIWW radio in San Antonio. Other partners included Pedro de Lille, W.B. Miller, and Noel Alrich Solano. However, new partners entered into the picture.

Romulo O'Farrill, a television pioneer who signed on Mexico's first television station, XHTV, in 1950, saw the need for a television station in this market and realized that it could be filled using the Mexican channel 7 allocation. A $300,000 investment was made in facilities and a 170-metre-high (560 ft) transmitter tower. The station, under the new call sign XELD-TV, signed on September 15, 1951, from its Mexican transmitter and studio, with a sales office in downtown Brownsville, Texas. The station was groundbreaking: not only was it the first television station in the state of Tamaulipas (and the third in the nation), it was the first Mexican television border blaster and the first Mexican station to obtain affiliation with an American network. Eventually, XELD boasted affiliations with all four American networks, though its primary affiliation was with CBS. The station was run much like an American station; it even had an American television representative, Blair TV.

Emilio Azcárraga, owner of XEW radio and TV in Mexico City, was a half-owner of XELD.

=== Closure ===
When the FCC freeze was lifted in April 1952, channels 4 and 5 remained in the Brownsville–Harlingen–Weslaco area, and prospective station owners in the United States got their chance. In September 1953, KGBT-TV, licensed to Harlingen, took to the air, taking with it the primary CBS and NBC affiliations. This began the decline of XELD. By January 1954, O'Farrill had sought and won approval to move channel 7 to Monterrey or Guadalajara, both large Mexican markets without television stations at the time.

On April 10, 1954, KRGV-TV signed on from Weslaco, becoming a secondary affiliate of ABC and primary NBC outlet. Later that month, on April 29, XELD "temporarily suspended" operations; a spokesman cited a devalued peso and a major breakdown in the station's generator as the main reasons for this move, which included the dismissal of all employees and the closure of the station's offices. Two months after, Hurricane Alice struck the region and destroyed XELD's facilities, putting a permanent end to the station. However, the station still led to the development of a new television market, with some 18,000 television sets in place. O'Farril and Azcarraga, along with XHGC-TV owner Guillermo Gonzalez Camarena, went on to form what is now Televisa the next year.

Channel 7 in Matamoros would remain vacant for almost 15 years, until a new television station, XHAB-TDT, began operating on it in 1968.
