= XHDF-TDT =

Television station in Mexico City

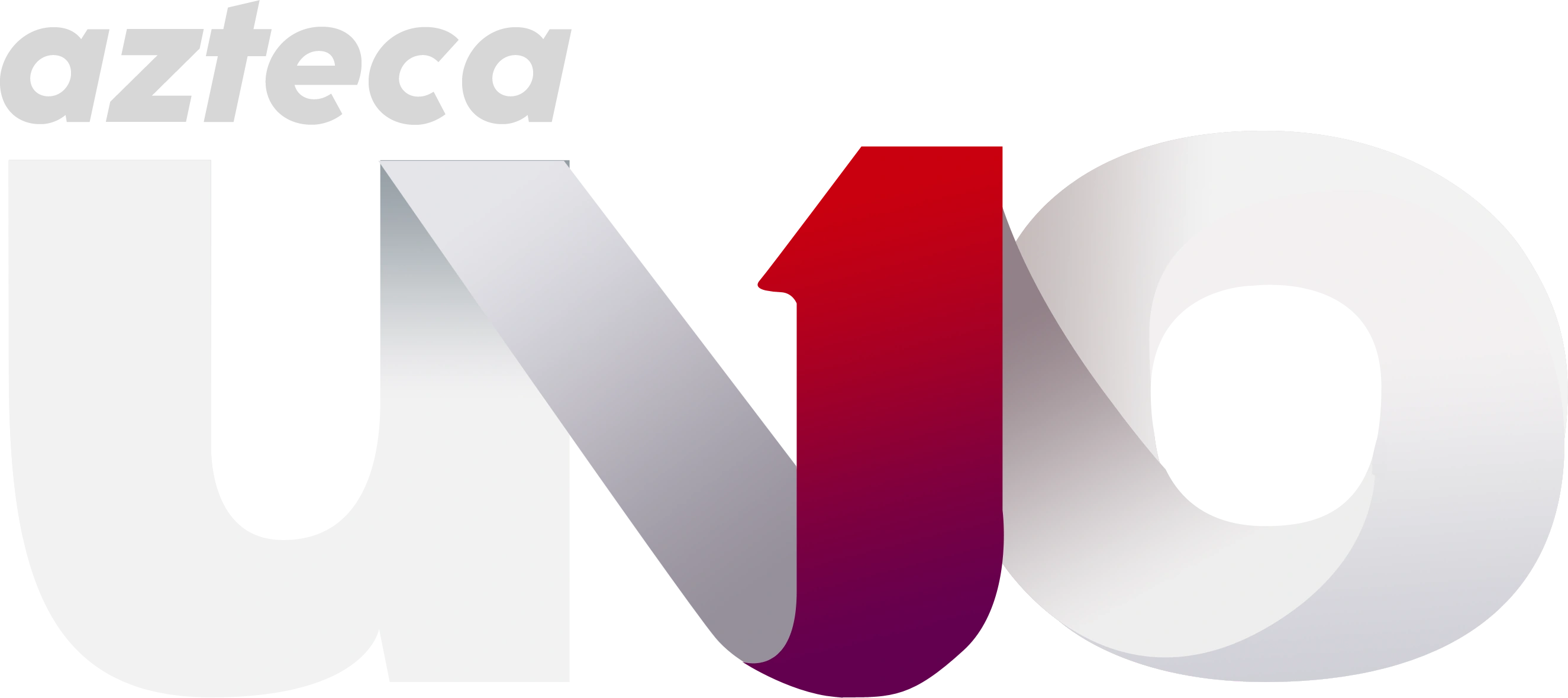
- Logo used since 2023
- Mexico City; Mexico
- Channels: Digital: 25 (UHF); Virtual: 1
- Branding: Azteca Uno; Azteca Uno Metropolitano

Programming
- Affiliations: 1.1: Azteca Uno; 1.2: Azteca Uno -1 hour

Ownership
- Owner: TV Azteca; (Televisión Azteca, S.A. de C.V.)
- Sister stations: XHIMT-TDT, XHTVM-TDT

History
- Founded: September 1, 1968
- Former call signs: XHDF-TV (1968–2015)
- Former channel numbers: Analog: 13 (VHF, 1968–2015); Virtual: 13 (2005–2016)
- Former affiliations: Independent (1968–1983)
- Call sign meaning: XH Distrito Federal (former name for administrative division containing Mexico City before 2016 unification into an autonomous entity)

Technical information
- Licensing authority: CRT
- ERP: 468.030 kW
- HAAT: 546 m (1,791 ft)
- Transmitter coordinates: 19°31′57.50″N 99°07′49.70″W
- Translator(s): see § Repeaters

Links
- Website: www.tvazteca.com/aztecauno/

XHDF-TDT (channel 1) is the flagship station of Mexico's Azteca Uno television network in Mexico City, Mexico. Azteca Uno can be seen in most major cities in Mexico through TV Azteca's owned-and-operated transmitter network. XHDF provides HD programming to other transmitters and cable and satellite viewers.

== History ==
=== Initial years of operation ===
The concession for XHDF-TV was awarded in 1968 alongside that of XHTM-TV channel 8. The two stations were intended to come on in time for the 1968 Summer Olympics. While the first programs were broadcast on September 1 with the transmission of the fourth government report of President Gustavo Díaz Ordaz, full programs began with the opening of the Olympic Games on October 12. XHDF was owned by Organización Radio Centro through concessionaire Corporación Mexicana de Radio y Televisión, S.A. de C.V. The station had studios and a transmitter at the Torre Latinoamericana along with a second facility on Calle Mina in the historic center of Mexico City, but XHDF primarily broadcast filmed series with fewer resources than its Mexico City competitors.

=== Nationalization ===
In 1972, due to debts owed to the state-owned Sociedad Mexicana de Crédito Industrial (Mexican Industrial Credit Society or SOMEX), XHDF and Corporación Mexicana de Radio y Televisión was nationalized.

The first director of the government-owned Canal 13 was Antonio Menéndez González, and after his death, he was succeeded by Enrique González Pedrero, senator of the state of Tabasco from the PRI. Corporación Mexicana de Radio y Televisión, along with another state-owned enterprise, Tele-Radio Nacional, began receiving new television concessions as part of a national expansion of the Mexico City station into a national television network.

One of the first orders of business for Canal 13 was a relocation. On July 14, 1976, Canal 13's new facilities in the Ajusco area of Mexico City were formally inaugurated by President Luis Echeverría. The event was attended by various figures from the political and business sectors of the country, including Secretary of the Interior Mario Moya Palencia and Secretary of Communications and Transportation Eugenio Méndez Docurro, as well as Emilio Azcárraga Milmo, Romulo O'Farrill and Miguel Alemán Velasco, who served as directors of Televisa.

In 1983, the Mexican government reorganized its broadcast holdings. The result was the creation of the Mexican Television Institute, which changed its name to Imevisión in 1985. Imevisión comprised not only Canal 13, now known as Red Nacional 13, but the former Televisión de la República Mexicana, with its channel 22 station, and a new network known as Red Nacional 7 and broadcast in Mexico City by the brand-new XHIMT-TV (channel 7).

During the Imevisión years, Red Nacional 13 continued to broadcast commercial programming, although it featured some programs with a cultural focus, such as Temas de Garibay, Entre Amigos with Alejandro Aura, and several programs with the journalist Jorge Saldaña.

=== Privatization ===
In 1993, the administration of Carlos Salinas de Gortari auctioned off Imevisión and some other government-owned media ventures in various packages. Radio Televisión del Centro, headed by electronics store owner Ricardo Salinas Pliego, bought all of the TV stations. The result was the creation of Televisión Azteca, which took its name from the holding company created for the largest of the packages: the Red Nacional 13, including XHDF.

== Technical information ==
=== Subchannels ===
The station's signal is multiplexed:

Subchannels of XHDF-TDT
Subchannel	Res.	Short name	Programming
1.1	1080i	XHDF	Azteca Uno
1.2	480i	XHDF	Azteca Uno -1Hr

=== Repeaters ===
XHDF-TDT has eight direct repeaters:

RF	Location	ERP
25	Pachuca, Hgo.	1.22 kW
25	Tepeji del Río, Hgo.	4 kW
25	Coacalco, Mex.	.820 kW
25	Iztapalapa	.770 kW
25	Topilejo	.064 kW
25	Chimalhuacán, Mex.	.220 kW
25	Ixtapaluca, Mex.	.515 kW
25	Amecameca, Mex.	.122 kW

=== Analog-to-digital conversion ===
XHDF was among the first stations in the country to obtain approval to build a digital television station, doing so in May 2005. The initial digital facility broadcast with just 37.6 kW, though its power was significantly raised ahead of the end of analog television. At midnight on December 17, 2015, XHDF analog on VHF channel 13 was shut off part of the IFT mandated transition from analog to digital television. In October 2016, the Azteca 13 network nationwide moved from virtual channel 13 to 1, with even the Mexico City station abandoning its longtime channel 13 designation. Ultimately, on January 1, 2018, the entire network was rebranded from Azteca Trece to Azteca Uno.
