= XHFN-TDT =

Azteca 7 transmitter in Monterrey, Nuevo León, Mexico

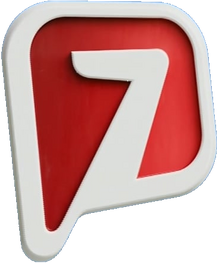
- Monterrey, Nuevo León; Mexico
- Channels: Digital: 17 (UHF); Virtual: 7
- Branding: Azteca 7

Programming
- Affiliations: Azteca 7

Ownership
- Owner: TV Azteca; (Televisión Azteca, S.A. de C.V.)
- Sister stations: XHWX-TDT

History
- Founded: February 1974
- Former call signs: XHFN-TV (1974-2015)
- Former channel numbers: Analog: 8 (VHF; 1974-1994); 7 (VHF; 1994-2015); Digital: 43 (UHF; to 2018)

Technical information
- Licensing authority: CRT
- ERP: 342.070 kW
- HAAT: −97.7 m (−321 ft) (XHLLO-TDT)
- Transmitter coordinates: 25°37′37.7″N 100°19′16.2″W
- Translator(s): XHLLO-TDT (Saltillo, Coahuila)

Links
- Website: TV Azteca Noreste

XHFN-TDT is a television station in Monterrey, Nuevo León, Mexico. The station carries the Azteca 7 network and also serves as the key station of the Azteca Noreste regional network, serving the northeastern states of Mexico with regional news and programming.

== History ==
XHFN signed on in February 1974 on channel 8, under the auspices of CEMPAE (Centro para el Estudio de Medios y Procedimientos Avanzados de la Educación, or "Center for the Study of Advanced Media and Education Processes"). It primarily broadcast educational programs and telecourses.

CEMPAE was shuttered on January 20, 1983, with the Secretariat of Public Education absorbing its assets. Two months later, upon the creation of the Instituto Mexicano de la Televisión (abbreviated Imevisión), XHFN became part of the new federal agency. As an Imevisión station, XHFN broadcast programs from its two networks as well as local Monterrey productions, including local news. In 1992, XHFN was part of the media package that became Televisión Azteca. Also in the 1990s, it moved from channel 8 to channel 7.

== Digital television ==
Channel	Video	Ratio	Callsign	Network	Programming
7.1	1080i	16:9	XHFN	Azteca 7-HD	Main XHFN-TDT Programming
7.2	480i	16:9	XHFN	A+ Noreste	Alternative and TV Azteca's rerun Programming

== Repeaters ==
XHFN-TDT is repeated on eight transmitters in Nuevo León:

RF	Location	ERP
17	China	.100 kW
17	Escobedo	.028 kW
17	Galeana	.081 kW
17	García	.120 kW
11	Guadalupe	9.292 kW
17	Linares	.100 kW
17	Montemorelos	.101 kW
17	Sabinas Hidalgo	8.588 kW
