= XHP-TDT =

- Puebla City, Puebla; Mexico
- Channels: Digital: 29 (VHF); Virtual: 4
- Branding: Televisa Puebla

Programming
- Subchannels: 4.1: Televisa Puebla
- Affiliations: Televisa Regional; Univision

Ownership
- Owner: TelevisaUnivision; (Televisora del Occidence S.A. de C.V.)

History
- First air date: May 5, 1966
- Former call signs: XHP-TV (1966-2015)
- Former channel numbers: 3 (analog VHF, 1966-2015)

Technical information
- Licensing authority: CRT

Links
- Website: televisa.com

XHP-TDT (channel 4), branded as Televisa Puebla, is a Puebla commercial television station. It is licensed to Puebla. The station is part of the Televisa Regional network; its concessionaire is Televisora de Puebla, SA de CV. The station carries Univision programs.

== History ==
The station was founded in 1961 as Canal 3 Televisora de Puebla and started broadcasting on May 5, 1966 (anniversary of the Battle of Puebla) with a live event from the Municipal Theatre.

In 1969, when XHTM-TV in Mexico City went live, it became a part of Televisión Independiente de México's network. From its inception to May 31, 1984, it aired a newscast, Día a Día. Following the merger of Telesistema Mexicano and TIM to create Televisa, the station continued relaying XHTM.

Noteworthy past children's programs included El club de la Buena Suerte and Tan Amigos. By 2003, it was carrying limited local programs and a variety of imports.

In March 2002, XHP was added to Sky México, enabling nationwide coverage for the station. On September 21, 2004, the station renewed its license to operate until December 31, 2021.

On March 14, 2015, the station was given approval from IFT to change its name from TV3 to Televisa Puebla. Its analog signal was switched off on December 17, 2015.
