= XEW-TDT =

Television station in Mexico City

- Mexico City; Mexico
- Channels: Digital: 32 (UHF); Virtual: 2
- Branding: Las Estrellas (The Stars)

Programming
- Affiliations: Las Estrellas

Ownership
- Owner: Grupo Televisa; (Televimex, S.A. de C.V.)
- Sister stations: XHTV-TDT, XHGC-TDT, XEQ-TDT, Televisa Regional

History
- First air date: March 21, 1951
- Former call signs: XEW-TV (1951–2015)
- Former channel numbers: Analog: 2 (VHF, 1951-2015); Digital: 48 (UHF, 2004–2017)
- Call sign meaning: From XEW-AM — the W was originally chosen as it was more commonly used in American callsigns

Technical information
- Licensing authority: CRT
- ERP: 270 kW
- HAAT: 621.7 m (2,040 ft)
- Transmitter coordinates: 19°35′22.5″N 99°06′55.54″W

Links
- Website: Las Estrellas

XEW-TDT (channel 2) is a television station in Mexico City, Mexico. Owned and operated by Grupo Televisa, it is the flagship station of the Las Estrellas network. XEW is the second-oldest Televisa station and Mexico City's second-oldest station, founded in 1951.

== History ==
XEW-TV received its license in 1950 and came on air March 21, 1951. It was the second television station to come to air in Mexico and built on the tradition of the successful and influential XEW-AM 900. The concession was and remains held by Televimex, S.A. de C.V. The first transmission was a baseball game from Delta Park. The station came on air with its studios, known as Televicentro, still under development; these did not open formally until January 1952. XEW's initial programming was an improvement over XHTV's amateur output.

It was not until 1982 that XEW, now the keystone of a national network, took on the name Canal de las Estrellas (Channel of the Stars). In 2016, the name was shortened to Las Estrellas as part of a branding refresh.

== Technical information ==
=== Subchannel ===
Subchannel of XEW-TDT
Subchannel	Res.	Short name	Programming
2.1	1080i	XEW	Las Estrellas

=== Analog-to-digital conversion ===
XEW-TV, alongside other television stations in Mexico City, ended regular programming on its analog signal, over VHF channel 2, at midnight on December 17, 2015, as part of the federally mandated transition from analog to digital television.

In 2016, in order to facilitate the repacking of TV services out of the 600 MHz band (channels 38–51), XEW was allowed to move from channel 48 to channel 32. The change occurred in April 2017, including a brief period in which both facilities operated at the same time.

=== Repeaters ===
XEW-TDT maintains two of its own repeaters that account for terrain masking and gaps in coverage within the licensed coverage area:

RF	Location	ERP
32	Col. El Tenayo/Tlalnepantla, State of Mexico	0.04 kW
32	Col. Ticomán, Mexico City	0.06 kW
32	Ixtapaluca, Mex.	0.800 kW

== Logos ==
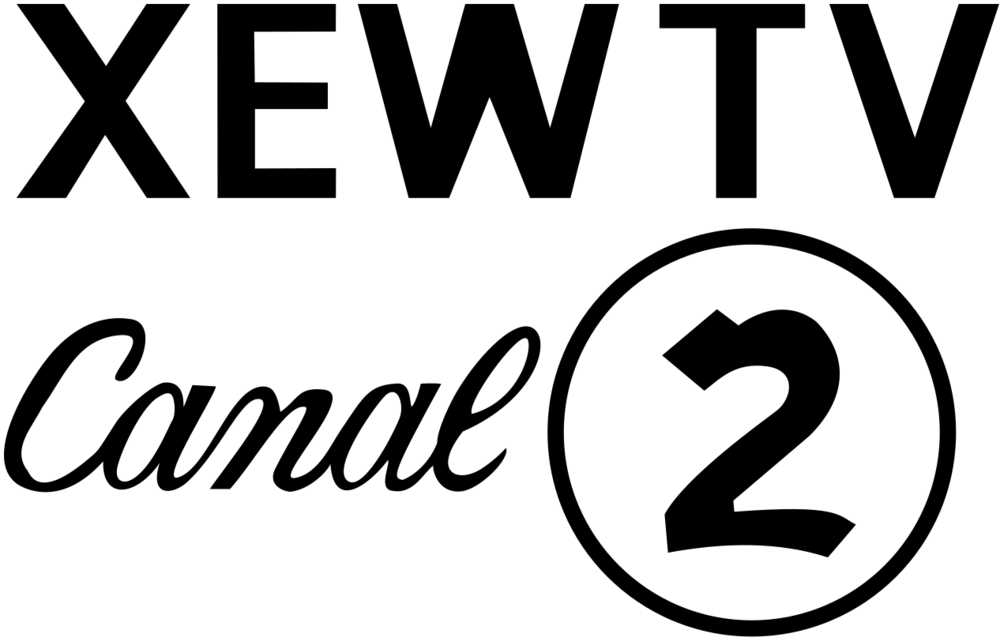
1951

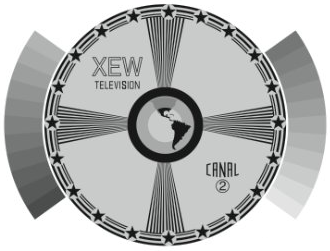
1952

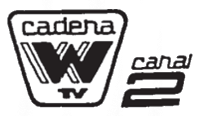
1966

1968

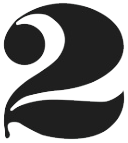
1970

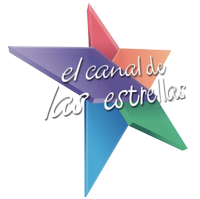
1993

1996

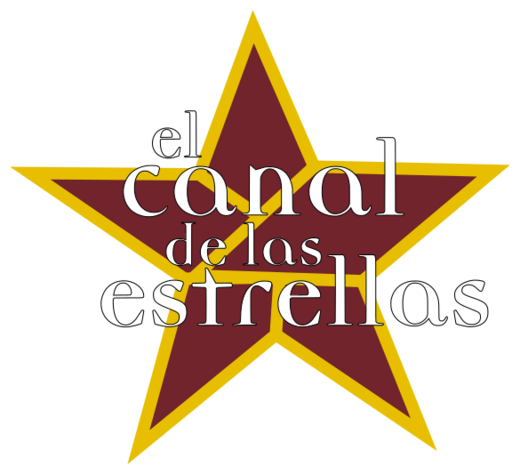
1997

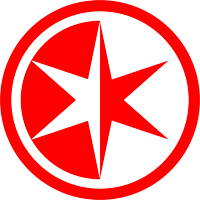
1997

2015

2016

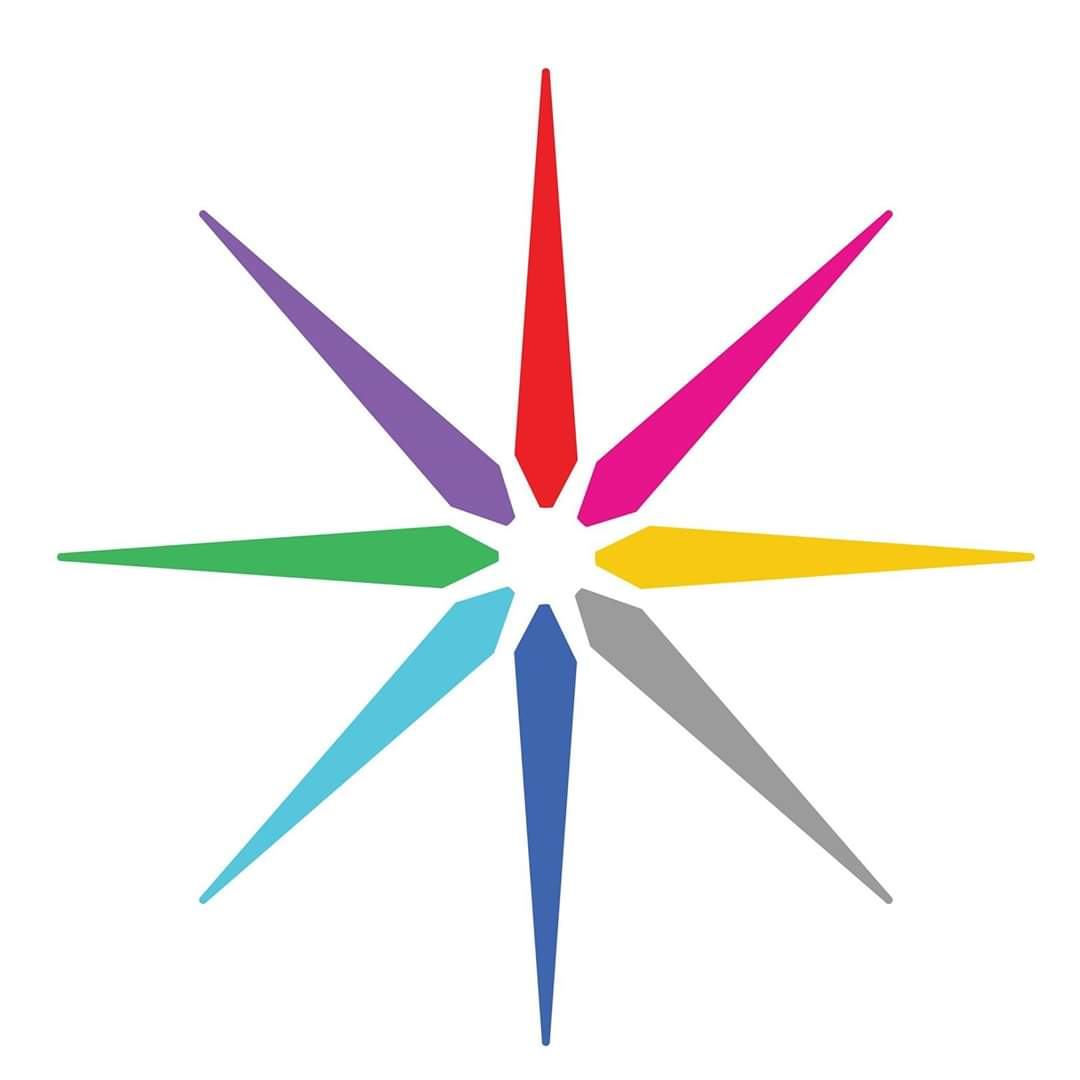
2017

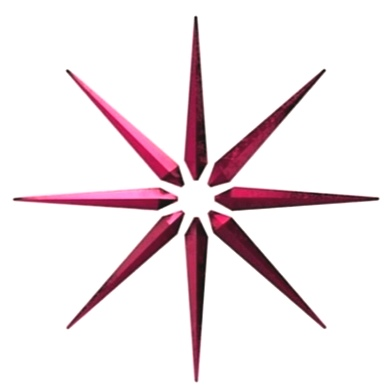
2023
