= XEQ-TDT =

Television station in Mexico City

- Mexico City; Mexico
- Channels: Digital: 22 (UHF); Virtual: 9

Programming
- Affiliations: Nu9ve

Ownership
- Owner: Grupo Televisa; (Teleimagen del Noroeste, S.A. de C.V.)
- Sister stations: XEW-TDT, XHTV-TDT, XHGC-TDT

History
- Founded: June 23, 1967
- First air date: January 25, 1969
- Former call signs: XHTM-TV (1968–1985); XEQ-TV (1985–2015)
- Former channel numbers: Analog: 8 (VHF, 1968-1985 in Mexico City; in Toluca, until 2016); 9 (VHF, 1985–2015); Digital: 44 (2005–2017)
- Call sign meaning: comes from radio station XEQ-AM

Technical information
- Licensing authority: CRT
- ERP: 270 kW
- HAAT: 621.7 m (2,040 ft)

XEQ-TDT (channel 9) is a television station in Mexico City, Mexico, serving as the flagship of the Nu9ve network. Unlike the other major networks in Mexico, Nu9ve is broadcast by a mix of full-time repeaters as well as local stations, operated by Televisa and its local partners, that also produce and air local programs.

== History ==
XEQ was founded in 1969, as XHTM-TV (channel 8), operated by Televisión Independiente de México (TIM). TIM was headquartered at Estudios San Angel from the time it signed on. In January 1973, TIM merged with Telesistema Mexicano, becoming Televisión Vía Satélite, better known as Televisa. TIM's Mexico City headquarters and production center became Televisa San Angel, which along with Televisa's original Chapultepec facility, is one of the network's two primary Mexico City studios.

In 1985, Imevisión desired to add a VHF station in Mexico City, which became XHIMT-TV channel 7. In order to accomplish this, a complex channel swap was conducted involving XHTM and Televisa's relay stations at Altzomoni in the State of Mexico. XEX-TV, then on channel 7, was moved to 8, and XEQ-TV, then on 9, was moved to channel 10. As part of the move, Televisa moved the XEQ-TV callsign to Mexico City, so the two repeaters on Puebla became XEX-TV and XHTM-TV.

For much of the 1980s, Televisa devoted channel 9 to noncommercial cultural and educational programming. This ended on November 19, 1990, when XEQ-TV returned to commercial programming.

In 2018, the concessions of all Televisa-owned Nu9ve stations were consolidated in the concessionaire Teleimagen del Noroeste, S.A. de C.V., as part of a corporate reorganization of Televisa's concessionaires.

== Technical information ==
=== Subchannel ===
Subchannel of XEQ-TDT
Subchannel	Res.	Short name	Programming
9.1	1080i	XEQ	Nu9ve

=== Analog-to-digital conversion ===
XEQ-TV and other television stations in Mexico City and Toluca discontinued regular programming on its analog signal, over VHF channel 9 (8 in Toluca), on December 17, 2015, at 12:00 a.m., as part of the IFT federally mandated transition from analog to digital television.

In 2016, in order to facilitate the repacking of TV services out of the 600 MHz band (channels 38-51), XEQ was allowed to move from channel 44 to channel 22. The change occurred in April 2017, including a brief period in which both facilities operated at the same time. The Toluca transmitter repacked in July 2018 at the same time as the other Televisa stations in Toluca.

=== Repeaters ===
RF	Location	ERP
22	Toluca, State of Mexico	200 kW
22	Ixtapaluca, State of Mexico	0.822 kW

The Toluca station carries certain local programs and is known as Nu9ve Estado de México. Local programming in Toluca began in 2002.
