= XHIMT-TDT =

Television station in Mexico City

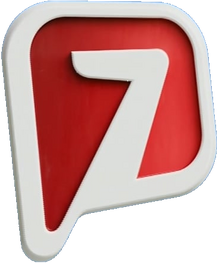
- Mexico City; Mexico
- Channels: Digital: 24 (UHF); Virtual: 7
- Branding: Azteca 7

Programming
- Affiliations: 7.1: Azteca 7; 7.2: A+

Ownership
- Owner: TV Azteca; (Televisión Azteca, S.A. de C.V.)
- Sister stations: XHDF-TDT, XHTVM-TDT

History
- Founded: May 15, 1985
- Former call signs: XHIMT-TV (1985–2015)
- Former channel numbers: Analog: 7 (VHF, 1985–2015)
- Call sign meaning: XH Instituto Mexicano de la Televisión (full name of Imevisión)

Technical information
- Licensing authority: CRT
- ERP: 464.42 kW
- HAAT: 547 m (1,795 ft)
- Transmitter coordinates: 19°31′57.50″N 99°07′49.70″W

Links
- Website: tvazteca.com/azteca7/

XHIMT-TDT (channel 7) is a television station in Mexico City, Mexico. It is the flagship station and namesake of the Azteca 7 television network.

== History ==
XHIMT came to air on May 15, 1985, as part of Imevisión's relaunch of the Televisión de la República Mexicana network into a full-fledged national network comparable to its existing Canal 13 network. It took over TRM's transmitter network, with 99 repeater stations serving 72% of the population. The new Red Nacional 7 (7 National Network) was positioned as targeting the working class and rural areas, while Red Nacional 13, based from XHDF, targeted a more middle- and upper-class audience.

The insertion of a channel 7 into Mexico City required a shuffle of frequencies in neighboring areas, with stations in Mexico City, Toluca and on Altzomoni moving to accommodate the last VHF station in the nation's capital.

From 1990 to 1993, Imevisión consolidated the programming of the channel 7 and 13 networks; this ended when both were privatized and Televisión Azteca was formed.

== Technical information ==
=== Subchannels ===
The station's signal is multiplexed:

Subchannels of XHIMT-TDT
Subchannel	Res.	Short name	Programming
7.1	1080i	XHIMT	Azteca 7
7.2	480i	XHIMT	A Más

On March 20, 2017, Azteca Noticias, an all-news channel, was replaced with the new A+ local service. Azteca Noticias moved to XHTVM-TDT 40.2.

=== Analog-to-digital conversion ===
In 2007, TV Azteca began testing its HD channel, but with different programming to analog. The HD channel had films, documentaries and some series, along with the news and a select few Azteca HD productions (such as soccer games). This, however, was not permitted under the digital television transition which required that digital companions carry the same programs as their analog counterparts.

In 2010, XHIMT-TDT began transmitting a direct Azteca 7 HD feed. 4:3 programs were stretched to fill the 16:9 space.

On December 17, 2015, at midnight, XHIMT analog channel 7 ceased broadcasts, as part of the federally mandated transition from analog to digital television.

=== Repeaters ===
XHIMT-TDT has eight direct repeaters:

RF	Location	ERP
24	Toluca, Mex.	59.046 kW
24	Tepeji del Río, Hgo.	4 kW
24	Cuautitlán, Mex.	.830 kW
24	Iztapalapa	.770 kW
24	Topilejo	.064 kW
24	Chimalhuacán, Mex.	.220 kW
24	Ixtapaluca, Mex.	0.506 kW
24	Amecameca, Mex.	.122 kW
