= Rómulo O'Farrill =

Mexican multi-millionaire businessman

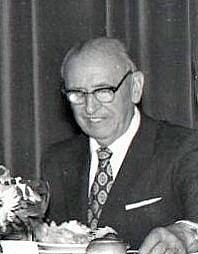
Romulo O'Farrill II in 1974

Rómulo O'Farrill II (15 December 1917 – 18 May 2006) was a Mexican multi-millionaire businessman.

His father, Rómulo O'Farrill, founded the Novedades newspaper and owned the first commercial TV station (XHTV, Canal 4) through his company Televisión de México.

With engineer Guillermo González Camarena and businessmen Emilio Azcárraga Vidaurreta, Ernesto Barrientos Reyes and Miguel Alemán Valdés as partners, they created the Telesistema Mexicano, S.A. company. Later on, in partnership with Emilio Azcárraga Milmo and Miguel Alemán Velasco and Televisión Independiente de México, he created TELEVISA. He was the honorary consul of Ireland in Mexico.

He learned English and graduated from Saint Anselm College in 1937.

== Family ==
Married to Hilda Ávila Camacho, daughter of General Maximino Ávila Camacho, for 60 years, he fathered six children, only four of whom survived. He has 10 grandchildren.

== Trivia ==
A bridge and a street in Mexico City are named after him.
