= Altzomoni =

Coordinates: 19.120°N 98.654°W

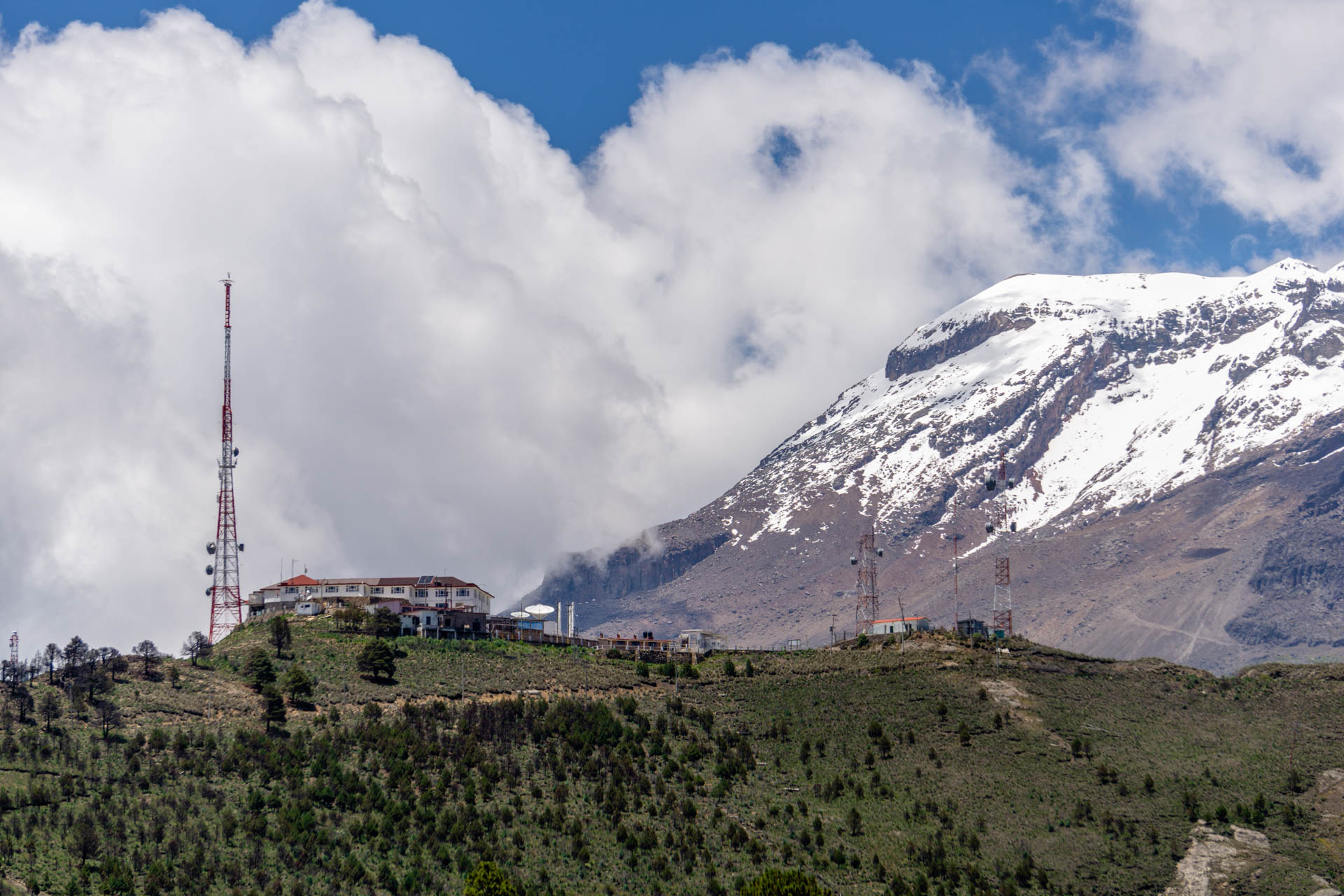
Radio stations located in Altzomoni, with the Iztaccihuatl in the background

Altzomoni is a volcanic peak located in the State of Mexico. Situated between the volcanoes Popocatépetl and Ixtaccíhuatl in the northern portion of the Paso de Cortés, Altzomoni rises 4,200 metres (13,800 ft) above sea level. It is located inside Izta-Popo Zoquiapan National Park.

The area is used as a base for those climbing Ixtaccíhuatl. It also is recognizable for its large television tower, used by Televisa for the transmission of analog television to Puebla and Cuernavaca.

The Universidad Nacional Autónoma de México also maintains an atmospheric observatory on the mountain.

== Television ==
Three digital television stations are based on the same tower. While each of them primarily serves Puebla, Cuernavaca and the state of Tlaxcala, they are licensed to Altzomoni:

- XEX-TDT (channel 42)
- XHTM-TDT (channel 36)
- XHATZ-TDT (channel 47)

Each of these stations has digital facilities which are on Televisa's tower in Puebla.
