= Televisa =

Mexican multimedia mass media company

Grupo Televisa, S.A.B.
- Trade name: Grupo Televisa
- Formerly: Televisión Vía Satélite S.A. (1973–1980s); Televisa S.A. (1980s–1991); Televisa S.A. de C.V. (1991–2021); Grupo Televisa, S.A. (1991–2006)
- Type: Public
- Traded as: BMV: TLEVISA; NYSE: TV (ADR)
- Industry: Mass media
- Predecessors: Telesistema Mexicano; Televisión Independiente de México
- Founded: 8 January 1973; 53 years ago
- Founder: Emilio Azcárraga Milmo
- Headquarters: Santa Fe, Mexico City, Mexico
- Area served: Worldwide
- Key people: Co-CEOs; Alfonso de Angoitia; Bernardo Gómez Martínez; José Bastón Patiño
- Products: Broadcasting, Cable, Satellite, TV, Radio, Publishing, Internet, Telecommunications
- Revenue: ▲US$7,561,872,519 (2018)
- Net income: ▼US$387,545,547 (2018)
- Members: Organización de Telecomunicaciones de Iberoamérica
- Number of employees: 42,900 approximate ▲
- Subsidiaries: Televisa Interactive; TelevisaUnivision (45%); Sky México (100%); Izzi; Bestel; AT&T Mexico (50%)
- Website: www.televisa.com (in Spanish) www.televisa.com/corporativo (Corporate)

Grupo Televisa, S.A.B., simply known as Televisa, is a Mexican telecommunications and broadcasting company and the largest in Hispanic America. A major Hispanic American mass media corporation, it often presents itself as the largest producer of Spanish-language content.

In April 2021, Televisa announced that they would sell the company's media and entertainment assets to Univision Communications, which would form a new company to be known as TelevisaUnivision. The transaction was completed on 31 January 2022, with Televisa owning a 45% stake of the company.

== Company ==
=== History ===
Since its beginning, the company has been owned by the Azcárraga family. The company has been led and owned by three generations of Azcárraga; each has marked an era for the company and, until October 2017, each had passed the ownership of the company to his son upon his death.

==== Emilio Azcárraga Vidaurreta (1955–1972) ====
Grupo Televisa was founded in 1955 as Telesistema Mexicano, linking Mexico's first three television stations: XHTV-TV (founded in 1950), XEW-TV (1951) and XHGC-TV (1952). Along with Emilio Azcárraga Vidaurreta, the O'Farril family and Ernesto Barrientos Reyes, who had signed on Mexico's first radio station, XEW-AM, in 1930, were co-owners of the firm. Its headquarters, known as Televicentro, were originally located on Avenida Chapultepec in downtown Mexico City. The building opened on 10 February 1952.

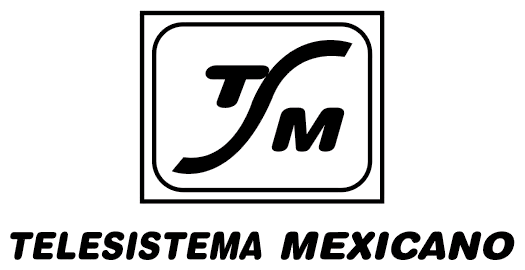
Logo of Telesistema Mexicano, one of the two networks that fused to become Televisa in 1973

The channel was the first national network to be broadcast in color in 1963. Before the launch, Telesistema began airing in color in the late 1950s in select cities along the U.S.-Mexico border, given the fact that color signals were already present since the start of US color television in the decade starting from 1954.

In 1968, Telesistema's main competitor, Televisión Independiente de México (TIM), entered Mexico City with XHTM-TV Canal 8. At the time, both Telesistema and TIM (which was based in Monterrey) competed with another new station, XHDF-TV channel 13, which also started transmissions in 1968. Over the next four years, both networks competed in content and image until they merged, taking on the name "Televisa" in 1973. In the merger deal, the owners of Telesistema had 75 percent of the stocks, while the owners of Televisión Independiente had the rest, which were sold to Telesistema later because of financial problems.

On 7 September 1970, 24 Horas debuted and became one of Mexico's most-watched news programs. The host, journalist Jacobo Zabludovsky, anchored the newscast for almost three decades.

The 1973 merger brought in another new face who would later help revolutionize television and pop music: Raúl Velasco and his Sunday program Siempre en Domingo, which was, from the start, being aired on Telesistema. Its successful run of 29 seasons (1969–98) not only featured the best pop artists from Spain and Latin America as well as from English-speaking countries, but also the most successful local singers, and its broadcast into many countries in both North and South America helped promote Latin pop to millions of television viewers.

==== Emilio Azcárraga Milmo (1972–1997) ====
On 17 August 1972, Emilio Azcárraga Vidaurreta died, and Emilio Azcárraga Milmo succeeded him as company president and owner. On 8 January 1973, both Telesistema Mexicano and Televisión Independiente de México merged, taking on the name Televisa, an acronym for Televisión Via Satélite in Spanish. In 1975, brothers Emilio Diez Barroso and Fernando Diez Barroso began working in the presidency offices of Televisa.

Televisa started to transmit several programs produced by the Universidad Nacional Autónoma de México in 1977. On 3 March 1983, Channel 8 was reformatted to become a cultural channel, offering informative programs, debates and cultural shows. In 1985, a frequency swap moved the station from channel 8 to 9, and Televisa also decided to swap its callsign for that of XEQ-TV, which had been on channel 9 and broadcast from Altzomoni; the XHTM callsign was moved to that station, which was moved to channel 10. Canal 9 eventually became Galavisión, now known as Gala TV.

On 19 September 1985, an earthquake measuring 8.1 on the Richter scale caused widespread damage in Mexico City and destroyed the south tower of Televisa's main building. Nonetheless, Televisa's transmissions were not seriously affected. However, several dubbed TV shows were lost.

In 1991, Televisa, with help from Japanese public television network NHK (Nippon Hōsō Kyōkai), began its first broadcast in HDTV, using the Japanese Multiple sub-Nyquist sampling Encoding MUSE system, the first in Latin America. Between 1993 and 1994 Televisa was about to buy Italian local TV station GBR, based in Rome, planning to import in Italy the network's mixed sport-telenovelas formula, but the transaction was ultimately aborted.

It was Azcárraga Milmo who presided over the launch of company owned Noticias ECO in 1988, which was the first Spanish language cable and satellite news network in Latin America. It was a financial and ratings failure, but set the stage for Milenio Television.

In 1994, Televisa gained 62 new television concessions for relay stations of its networks, a decision that was criticized for its lack of transparency.

==== Emilio Azcárraga Jean (1997–2017) ====
In April 1997, Milmo died and Emilio Azcárraga Jean succeeded him as the president of the company. Azcárraga Jean was 29 years old and he was one of the youngest executives in Mexico at that time. In December 1997, Televisa joined with other Mexican media companies to create a marathon known as Teletón, whose mission is to provide knowledge about physical disabilities, giving a strong message about respect, equality and support to people in these conditions. This movement from media, enterprises and Mexicans is reflected in the buildings created with the money from this Marathon, named Centros de Rehabilitación Infantil (CRIT). It is said that sponsors use it as a way to deduce taxes as the Teletón takes place at the end of the fiscal year and therefore allows companies to deduce their donations before declaring their incomes.

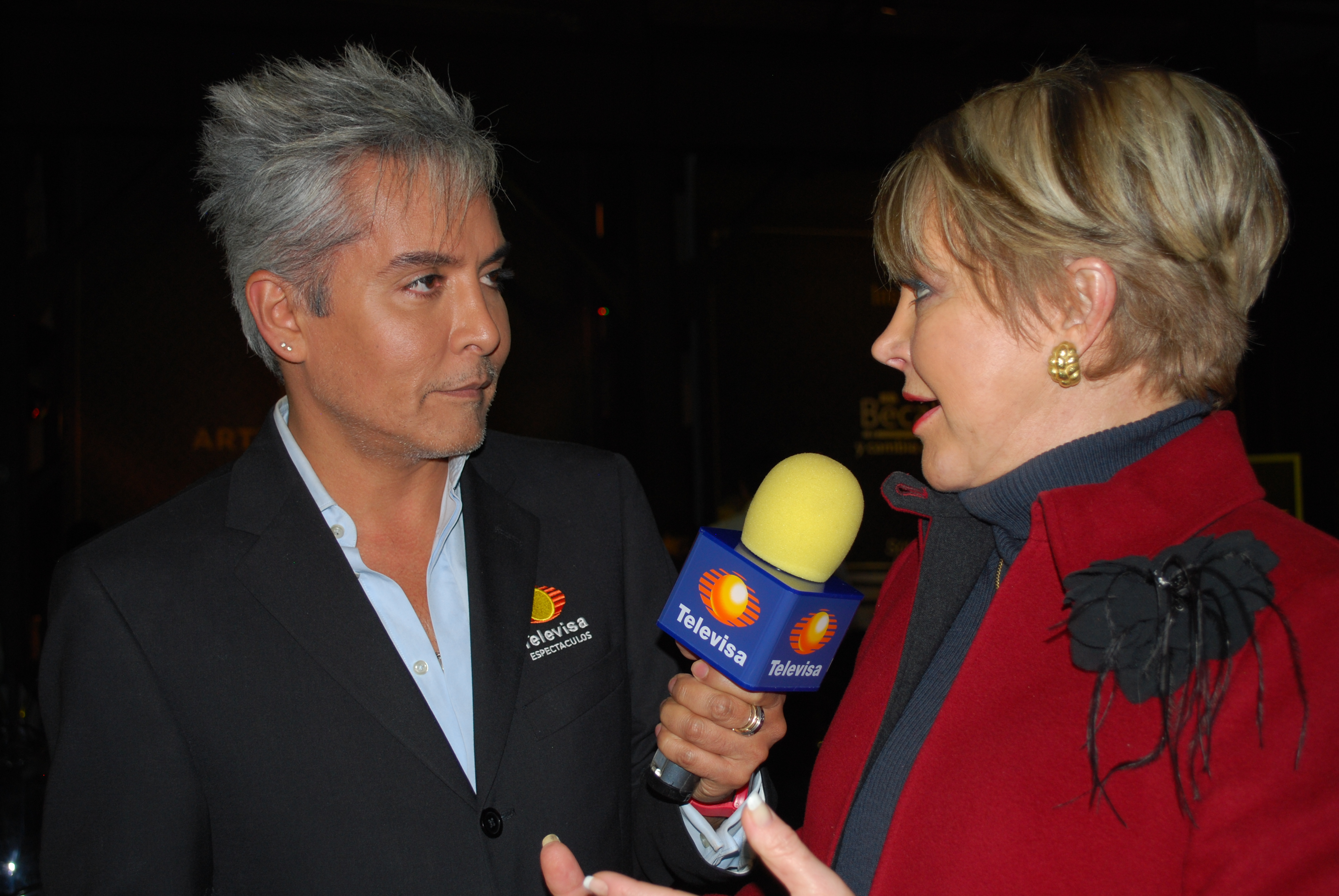
Interview with Lolita Ayala at the charity auction "Arte en Barricas" sponsored by Tequila Herradura in Mexico City

Televisa is the largest mass media company in Latin America, and it is owned by the Azcárraga family. Televisa controls 66% of the 465 television concessions. Also Televisa owns television programing and broadcasting, programing pay television, publishing distribution, cable television, radio production and broadcasting, football teams (Club Necaxa and Club America), stadiums, Televisa editorial (that makes books, newspapers and magazines), paging services, professional sports and business promotion, film production and distribution, dubbing, operation of horizontal internet portal, DVD distribution, EMI Televisa music, PlayCity casino, etc.

==== Political Coziness ====
There is complicity between Mexican media and government. Media and political power in México have a symbiotic relationship where the economic elites that control the media (Televisa and TV Azteca) are privileged in exchange for their support for the policies and actions of the government. In México the mass media owners are likely to have access to high levels of the Mexican government. On 3 May 2006, the community of San Salvador Atenco was violently repressed by the Mexican police who used excessive force and committed severe human rights violations. This event was one of the most violent repressions in the nation's history. This event is important because it shows how Televisa and TV Azteca were involved in inciting and supporting the repression of the people of Atenco by the government in México. The approval of the repression of Atenco by TV Azteca and Televisa can be seen as a clear example of the collaboration between mass media and government. Televisa and TV Azteca through their news programs support government policies without criticism and dismiss alternative voices to the dominant discourse. When this event occurred, mass media portrayed the farmers of Atenco as a radical social movement without reporting the reason behind the mobilization. In México the mass media are not there to provide objective information, México is under the shadow of authoritative journalism, in which they are only there to endorse an agenda that is aligned with the government.

In August 2014, Televisa announced it would acquire the remaining shares in Mexican cable firm Cablecom that it did not already own for a fee of around $653.96 million. In September 2014, it was announced that Grupo Salinas would acquire Grupo Televisa's 50 percent stake in Mexico's third largest wireless operator Iusacell for a fee of $717 million. In January 2016, Televisa introduced a new branding, including a new logo design: an updated version of the company's logo from 1973, and a new slogan "Tu companía, tu más".

==== Post-Azcárraga family leadership; sale of content assets to Univision and spin-off of gambling, publishing and sports assets (2017–present) ====
Emilio Azcárraga Jean renounced the leadership of Televisa in October 2017, although he remains chairman of the company's board of directors. The newly appointed leader of the company will be the first not to be part of the Azcarraga family. The move was made to combat the massive decline in Televisa's viewership created by the rise in popularity of Netflix and other video streaming services, becoming more popular than cable television, as well as the end of the duopoly of private channels caused by the arrival of new players in the 2010s.

On 13 April 2021, Televisa announced that it would sell its content assets to its longtime U.S. partner, Univision Communications which it would combine Televisa's four free-to-air television networks in Mexico, specialty channels, its Videocine film studio, and the Televisa trademark; with Univision's broadcast networks and specialty channels, radio, and digital assets. The merger was targeted to be completed by the end of that year, subject to U.S. and Mexican regulatory reviews, and the new company would be known as TelevisaUnivision. Televisa would own 45% of the combined company and would retain its shares in Club America football team, telecommunication company Izzi Telecom, satellite TV provider Sky Mexico, and publishing businesses, as well as the broadcast licenses for free-to-air TV stations within Mexico and other infrastructure for the company's four TV networks; the national and local TV news operations were spun off into Tritón Comunicaciones.

The sale was approved by Mexico's Federal Telecommunications Institute (IFT) on 15 September 2021. The merger was approved by American Federal Communications Commission (FCC) on 24 January 2022, while the sale was completed on 31 January of that same year.

In 2023, Televisa announced plans to spin off its gambling and sports operations as a separate company. The company was named Ollamani and the spin-off was completed on 20 February 2024.

In 2024, Televisa acquired AT&T's controlling stake in Sky México, pending regulatory approval. That same year, the company announced that Azcárraga would be taking an "administrative leave" pending the results of a United States Department of Justice investigation regarding the broadcasting rights to FIFA tournaments.

In 2023, U.S. investors accused the company of bribing FIFA officials to secure the rights to four World Cup tournaments. In October 2024, Grupo Televisa announced Mr. Emilio Azcárraga Jean, Executive Chairman of the Board, took a leave of absence, while the investigation conducted by the United States Department of Justice, related to FIFA, was resolved.

In August 2025, Televisa merged Izzi and Sky. In the 2Q25, Grupo Televisa also reported net profits of MX$474.5 million (US$25.3 million), reversing a loss-making trend that had persisted for over a year.

In 2026, JPMorgan Chase acquired a 5.5% stake in Grupo Televisa, according to a filing with the U.S. Securities and Exchange Commission (SEC). The New York-based firm now holds 140.9 million Ordinary Participation Certificates (CPOs).

== Properties and services ==
=== Properties or partial properties ===
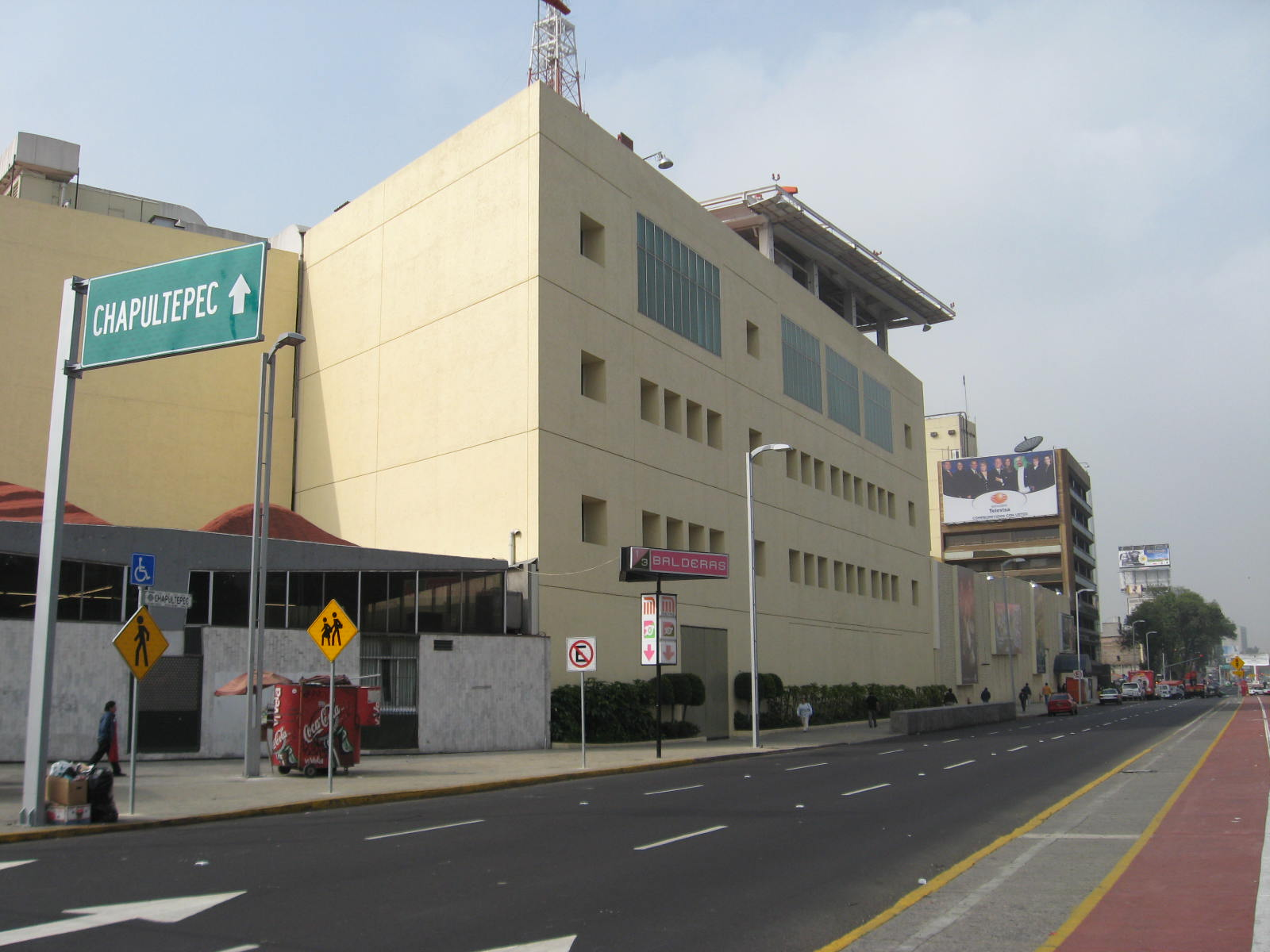
Televisa filming studio town in Chapultepec

Televisa is the second-largest media conglomerate in Latin America behind Grupo Globo, with interests in television broadcasting, programming for pay television, international distribution of television programming, direct-to-home satellite services, publishing and publishing distribution, cable television, radio production and broadcasting, professional sports and show business promotions, paging services, feature film production and distribution, dubbing, and the operation of a horizontal Internet portal. TelevisaUnivision Mexico's telenovelas generally run only one season and are broadcast internationally. The conglomerate has partially to complete interest in the following companies:

==== Telecommunications and pay-television industry ====
- Cable providers
  - Izzi Telecom (formerly known as Cablevisión México) is the internet, fixed telephony and cable TV provider of Grupo Televisa. The company is made of several formerly separate companies (Cablevisión DF, Cablemas, Cablevisión Monterrey, Cablecom and Telecable) combined to provide competition against Telmex.
  - Sky México

==== Publishing (books, magazines and newspapers) ====
- Editorial Televisa
  - Vanidades
  - TVyNovelas
  - Rolling Stone Mexico
  - Muy Interesante (Mexico)
- Intermex (Editorial house)

==== Websites ====
- Comercio Más (Internet EsMas.com)
- Televisa Digital (Internet)
- N+ LIVE

==== Studios ====
- Televisa Chapultepec
- Televisa San Ángel
- Televisa Santa Fe
- Televisa Guadalajara
- Televisa Monterrey
- Televisa Puebla

==== Other ====
- Fundación Televisa
- Más Fondos (Investment Group)
- Volaris (Airline) (Sold on 16 July 2010)
- PlayCity Casino (Gambling)
- Multijuegos (Lotto)

=== Media networks ===
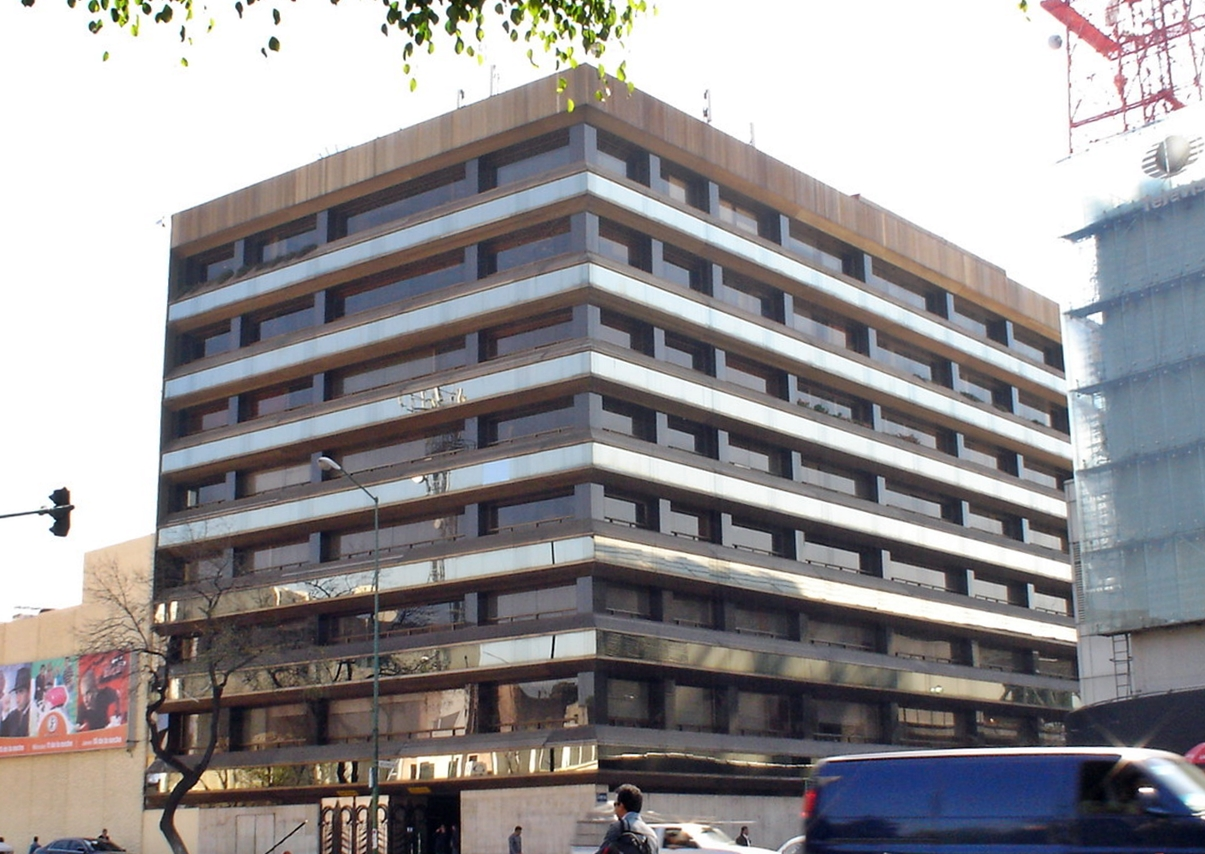
Exterior of Televisa building in Chapultepec.

Televisa is the largest shareholder of TelevisaUnivision, which provides programming throughout Mexico through four networks via Las Estrellas, Foro, Canal 5 and Nu9ve, and in the United States via Univision and UniMás through local affiliates. 253 Mexican local television stations (54.8% of the total commercial stations), and 59 US local television stations air programming from all six terrestrial networks.

TelevisaUnivision also operates a subsidiary called Televisa Networks (it's still often recognized within the entertainment industry by its previous moniker, Visat). This subsidiary is responsible for the distribution of Televisa programmes by satellite. The company also distributes the international feed of Las Estrellas via satellite to Latin America, Europe, Australia, and New Zealand.

== Criticisms and controversies ==
=== Political bias, defamation and impartial news coverage ===
Due to Televisa's multiple and diverse areas of business and political interests around the country, Latin America and the U.S., it has been often accused of airing misleading information about individuals or organizations in which may exist a conflict of interest. Many remember the famous phrase from the former owner of Televisa Emilio Azcarraga Milmo referring to himself as a "soldado del Partido Revolucionario Institucional (PRI)" (soldier of the Institutional Revolutionary Party), the longtime ruling political party in Mexico that held presidency of Mexico uninterruptedly for 71 years from 1929 to 2000, however, with his death and the arrival of his son Emilio Azcarraga Jean to the head of the network, there was the promise to cut all political ties with the PRI. However, if the relationship ended or not has been widely disputed, along with their impartiality when it comes to their economic interests in diverse business areas.

==== Francisco Ibarra and Emilio Maurer ====
Long before 1991, Televisa exercised strong control over the Mexican Football Federation (Federación Mexicana de Fútbol) in which they participated with the ownership of two teams (Club América and Necaxa). However, that year a rival group, Imevision (now TV Azteca) took control over the federation with Francisco Ibarra as the acting president and Emilio Maurer as Secretary, both of whom started a series of changes concerning mainly to the administration of a poll of money earned in sponsorships of the National Soccer Team; this fight resulted in a prosecution through several TV channels owned by the network resulting in Ibarra and Maurer being expelled from the Federation, even Maurer being incarcerated. Rumors of then President of Mexico Carlos Salinas de Gortari being involved in this prosecution began to circulate, however, this was never confirmed.

==== Santiago Creel Miranda ====
In 2008, the approval of a series of laws that would enable the Federal Institute of Elections (IFE) to buy in exclusive airtime for political campaigns on TV networks, radio and newspapers for all political parties, that would undermine the economical revenue of Televisa and TV Azteca in marketing political candidates to public election posts, led to the virtual "disappearance" in news shows and other programming of Televisa network (along with TV Azteca) in retaliation to Santiago Creel Miranda and other lawmakers (senadores) of all political parties involved in the approval of these laws.

==== Issac Saba Raffoul ====
In 2010, Televisa (along with competitor TV Azteca) began airing a series of reports in their news shows in which they claimed that businessman Isaac Saba Raffoul held a monopoly in the field of pharmaceuticals distribution along with the country with their enterprise Grupo Saba, those affirmations occurred as a consequence of the business partnership between Isaac Saba Raffoul and General Electric to become the third national television network. This partnership, in the potential case of becoming successful in acquiring rights from the Federal Government to transmit along the country, would have diminished the TV market share of Televisa and TV Azteca.

==== Grupo Reforma ====
In 2011, Televisa began airing a series of reports related to publication of classifieds on newspapers owned by Grupo Reforma (a large holding of businesses that includes newspapers, online news and others) of women offering sex service, often offered as massage service, escort service, etc. implying these could lead to various crimes like human trafficking, sexual slavery, kidnapping of women and others (prostitution laws in Mexico are very ambiguous). Although those classifieds are published in a wide range of newspapers around the country, Televisa specifically targeted Grupo Reforma's publications. Analysts say this was a retaliation against Grupo Reforma for their extense coverage of the affair of their star news anchor Carlos Loret de Mola, all of this, however, as a retaliation itself to the fact that Televisa obtained licenses to provide third and fourth generation wireless services in partnership with communications giant Nextel.

==== Carlos Slim Helu (Telmex) ====
In 2011, Televisa began airing reports concerning an allegedly monopoly of Telmex and America Movil (Telcel) on national cellular phone service and claiming that customers were being overcharged; also claiming that fees to interconnect to existing cellular grid and infrastructure to third parties were excessively high. This fight occurred when both companies were trying to obtain from the Federal Government the rights to offer to customers "Triple Play" which means that one carrier could provide cellular service, television and internet in one complete package. However, this matter resulted on interminable courtroom fights between both parties and the decision has been delayed so far.

==== Pablo Salazar Mendiguchia ====
In 2011 Televisa began airing an extense coverage on the arrest and incarceration of Chiapas ex-governor Pablo Salazar Mendiguchia, accused of several crimes, this coverage was prolonged and very extensive. In an interview with journalist Carmen Aristegui, famed writer and analyst Rafael Loret de Mola accepted to some degree that perhaps a political prosecution was occurring, but that his main concern was that he had (and showed on air) a legal document in which Adela Micha Zaga (a news anchor with Televisa) gives legal power to then ex-governor Pablo Salazar Mendiguchia (also a lawyer) to act as an inmobiliary agent to sell a condo she possessed a few years ago. His concern was about a "perverse" relation between Salazar and Televisa journalists.

==== May 2012 rallies ====
On 19 May 2012 a series of rallies "Marchas Anti-Peña" (Rallies Against-Peña) were held across the country (D.F., Guadalajara, Monterrey, Pachuca, Aguascalientes, Chihuahua, Tuxtla Gutierrez, Jalapa, Colima, and others). In addition to proclaiming dislike of Enrique Peña Nieto (the political candidate of the PRI), the protest was also aimed at the news coverage of Peña Nieto, principally by the program Tercer Grado. The rally organizers claimed that Televisa was actively assisting Peña Nieto to win the forecoming election and that their intense coverage of his activities as the Governor of Estado de Mexico, helped him position as the No. 1 in opinion polls. Rallies also occurred outside of Televisa San Angel (Televisa headquarters), where some of the protesters were permitted to air their points of view on a nationwide telecast.

As of 2011, its closest competitors are TV Azteca (also in Mexico) and TVE (Spain). In 2012, he was embroiled in controversy since the progressive movement, headed by leading left into Mexico Andrés Manuel López Obrador, was openly accused of sponsoring the PRI candidate Enrique Peña Nieto.

==== Money laundering ====
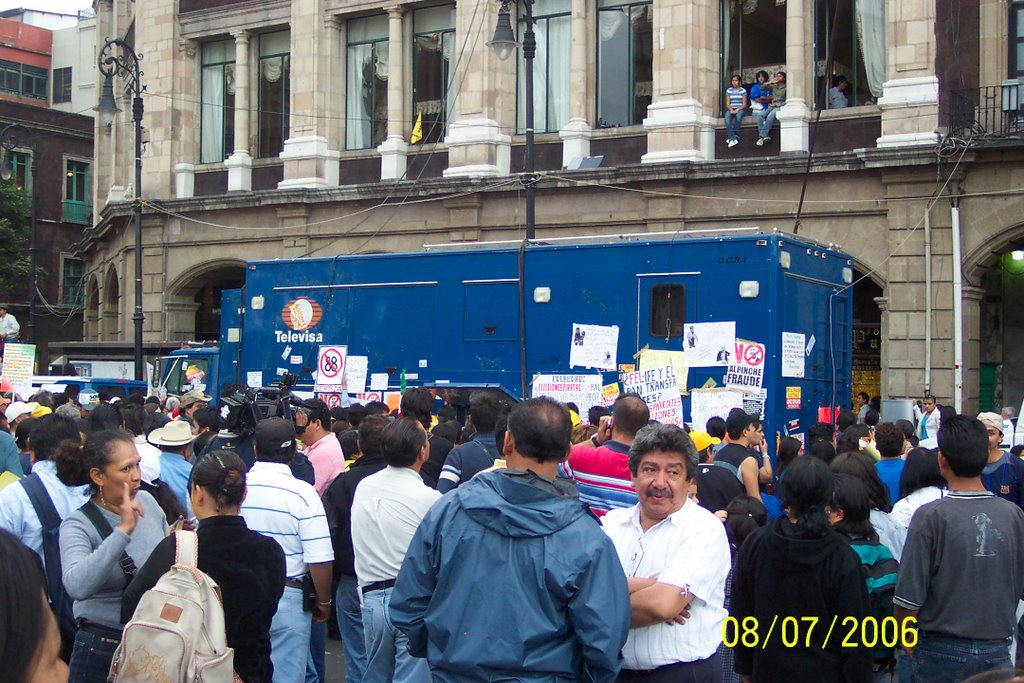
Protest before a Televisa truck in the Plaza de la Constitución, Mexico city, July 8, 2006.

On 23 August 2012, 18 alleged company employees were arrested in Nicaragua, accused of international drug trafficking, organized crime and money laundering; six vans that bore the logo of the media company also were seized which had professional production equipment for television transmission and registered in the name Televisa SA de CV, where drugs and $9.2 million in cash were transported. According to statements of the television itself, detainees do not belong to Televisa, and the vehicles were registered with false documents to the Ministry of Transport and Roads of the Federal District. Supposedly stationery used in these forgeries (especially some business cards and letterhead) involved Amador Narcia, a reporter who disappeared from Televisa News following this scandal.

==== Televisa political bias in favor of Margarita Zavala controversy ====
On 21 November 2016 Televisa released a telenovela (soap opera) titled La candidata starring Silvia Navarro as Regina Bárcenas (the speculated fictional stand-in for Margarita Zavala) and Rafael Sánchez Navarro as her husband Alonso San Roman (the speculated fictional stand-in for Felipe Calderón). It is heavily speculated this television program, was created in order to favor Zavala in the 2018 elections against MORENA's political candidate Andrés Manuel López Obrador whom Televisa supposedly didn't want as president due to his left-leaning political viewpoints.

==== Alleged under-coverage of Jaime "El Bronco" Rodriguez Calderon ====
Previous to the release of the telenovela, during the same year Televisa found in itself on another political bias controversy showing bias against Nuevo León's governor Jaime "El Bronco" Rodríguez Calderón who is a potential 2018 presidential candidate It happened on 11 September 2016, during a Live-Television News broadcast from "Monterrey al Dia" where Televisa news reporter, Karla Minaya, mistakenly said: "hay que tratar de que el gobernador... entre lo menos posible" ("we have to try to mention the governor as little as possible") which was perceived to show clear signs of political bias from the network. The Mexican newspaper El Universal published on social media a video of the event, which was covered by national news media although Televisa did not cover the story and declined to comment. El Bronco's predecessor Rodrigo Medina de la Cruz had spent 4000 millions of pesos on payments to television news media (Televisa included), supposedly to clean his image. Sick of what he considered to be the corruption in the Mexican media, El Bronco had previously vowed to not spend a single peso on purchasing favorable media coverage. So supposedly in retaliation, the Mexican Televisa news mentioned him the least possible, or with biased news coverage of unfair criticisms and defamation. In El Bronco's own words: "Hay 314 denuncias de carros robados y recuperamos 229, pero como no le pagamos a Televisa, Multimedios y TV Azteca, no lo sacan. Hemos logrado desintegrar bandas roba carros y roba traileres, y lo hemos hecho dicho en todas las ruedas de prensa, pero Televisa, Multimedios y TV Azteca no lo sacan." (There are 314 denouncements of stolen cars, we retrieved 229, but since we didn't pay Televisa, Multimedios and TV Azteca they don't show it. We have disbanded a band of thieves of cars and trucks. We have said it on every press round, but Televisa, Multimedios and TV Azteca don't show it.)

=== 2017 Puebla earthquake fake news controversy ===
On 19 September 2017, an 7.1 magnitude earthquake hit Mexico City, collapsing 40 buildings. During the news coverage of the devastation, Televisa reported there was a 12-year-old girl named Frida Sofia trapped within the debris of the Enrique C. Rébsamen school. The Mexican Navy initially corroborated the story, but on September 21, officials claimed that they were "sure that the existence of the minor was not a reality." Televisa was heavily criticized for sharing fake news and making rescue teams waste time saving a non-existent girl, distracting them from saving real people trapped in the debris.

Later that day, rival network TV Azteca decided to air S3E13 of The Simpsons, "Radio Bart", whose plot consisted of Bart Simpson fooling the people on Springfield into thinking a little kid named Timmy O'Toole was trapped in a hole, mirroring the way Televisa fooled Mexico about Frida Sofia. Timmy O'Toole soon became the topic of internet memes.

=== Denigratory treatment towards women ===
In the Netflix documentary Cuando conocí al Chapo: La historia de Kate del Castillo focused on the story of how actress Kate del Castillo met Mexican drug dealer Joaquín "El Chapo" Guzmán. The aforementioned former Televisa actress, along producer Epigmenio Ibarra, both stated that during the 90's Televisa treated actresses as sex objects, going as far as offering them to investors and publicists.

== Partnerships with other television networks ==
=== Televisa and Univision ===
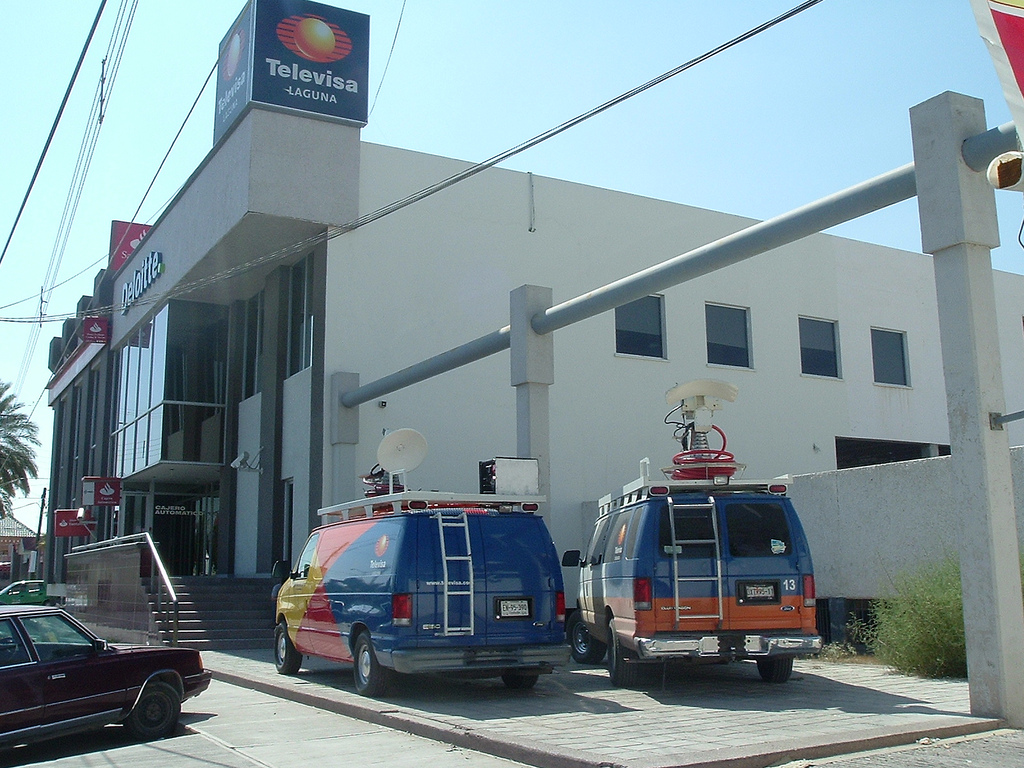
Televisa Laguna facilities in Torreón, Coahuila, MEX.

Televisa has an ongoing relation with the US-based Univision network, dating back to the 1960s, when Univision's predecessor, the Spanish International Network (SIN), was owned by Telesistema Mexicano, Televisa's predecessor.

In October 2010, Televisa agreed to take a 5% stake in Univision and to extend and expand the companies' long-term program license agreement. The new program license agreement will include Internet and mobile rights and cover key Mexican football (soccer) rights and will run through at least 2020.

=== Televisa and Telemundo ===
On 18 March 2008, Televisa and NBCUniversal announced a 10-year multiplatform agreement that would allow 1,000 hours of Telemundo programming from news, entertainment programs, specials, and sports to be broadcast over not only its Galavision channel (XEQ-TV), but also its SKY Channel and Cablevision cable system starting in April, as well as a planned Telemundo pay TV channel to be launched later in 2008.

=== Televisa's uncompleted agreement to acquire a stake in Nextel Mexico ===
In January 2010, Televisa announced an offer to acquire a 30% stake in Nextel Mexico from NII Holdings for US$1.44 billion. However, they later terminated the agreement.

== In popular culture ==
=== Film depiction ===
The perceived political favoritism of Televisa towards the PRI, and the concept of the "cortinas de humo (smoke screens)" was explored in the Mexican black-comedy film The Perfect Dictatorship (2014), directed and written by Luis Estrada, whose plot directly criticizes both the PRI and Televisa. Taking place in a Mexico with a tightly controlled media landscape, the plot centers around a corrupt politician (a fictional stand-in for Enrique Peña Nieto) from a political party (serving as a fictional stand-in for the PRI), and how he makes a deal with TV MX (which serves as a stand-in to Televisa) to manipulate the diffusion of news towards his benefit, in order to save his political career. The director made it based on the perceived media manipulation in Mexico.

== Logos ==
Televisa's well-known logo, the "sun", designed to look like an oval broken into ten lines with the sun in the scenery, was designed by Pedro Ramírez Vázquez, symbolizing as the spectator's vision to watch the world throughout the television. In 1980, the "sun" logo was colorized, with the lines now being colored orange and the circle now colored yellow. Televisa introduced a new logo on November 27, 2000 designed by Lippincott, putting eight lines instead of ten, and it closely resembles the previous logo, with the sun now being a 3D sphere, which in turn making the logo either an eye or a slice of an avocado with 8 lines cut, and the wordmark was brought back and in Helvetica Black.

On January 16, 2016, the company updated its logo with a flatter, "digital" appearance, and a revised version of its pre-2000 logo. However, it was first seen in a In Memoriam video from 2012, four years before its on-screen debut.

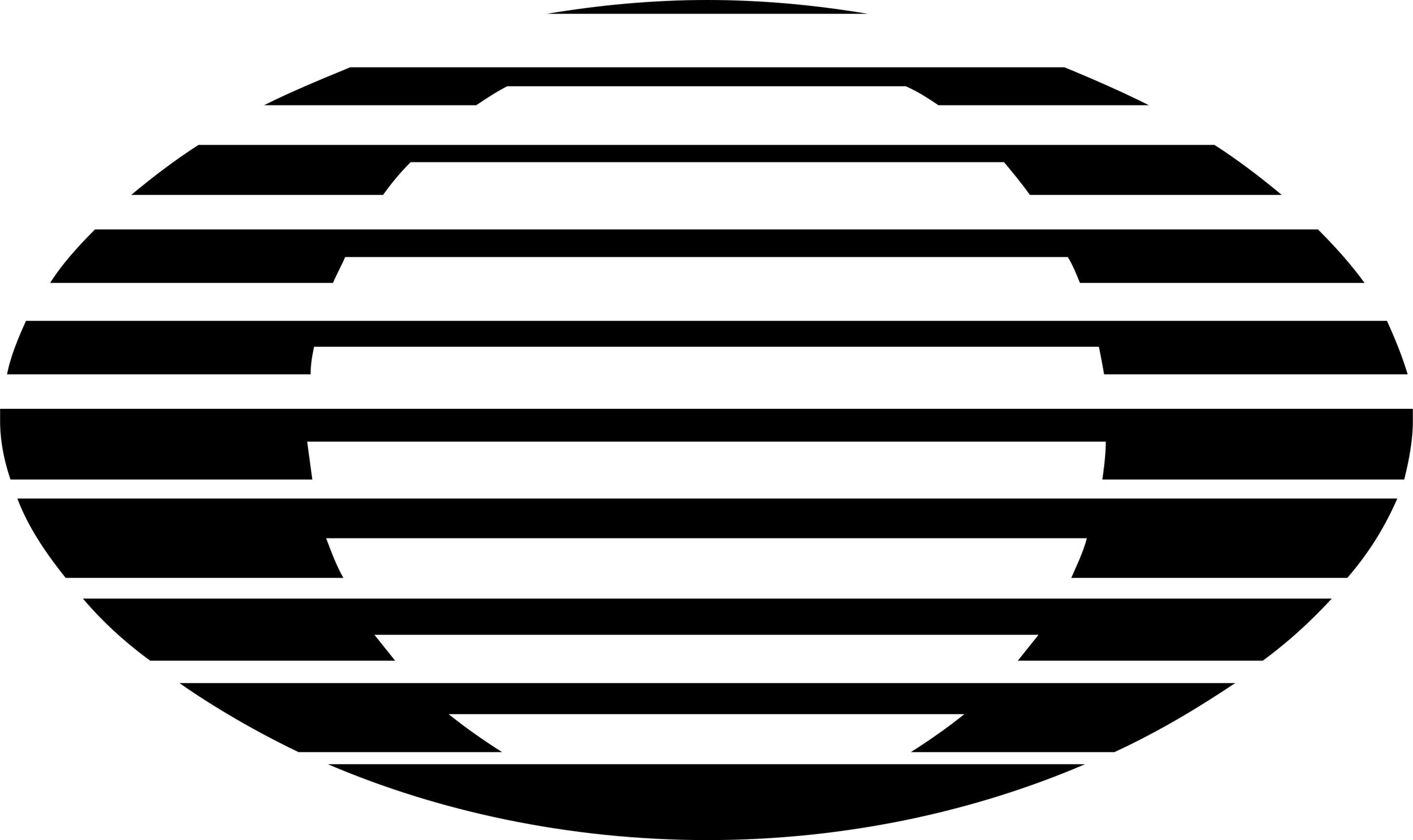
1973–2000

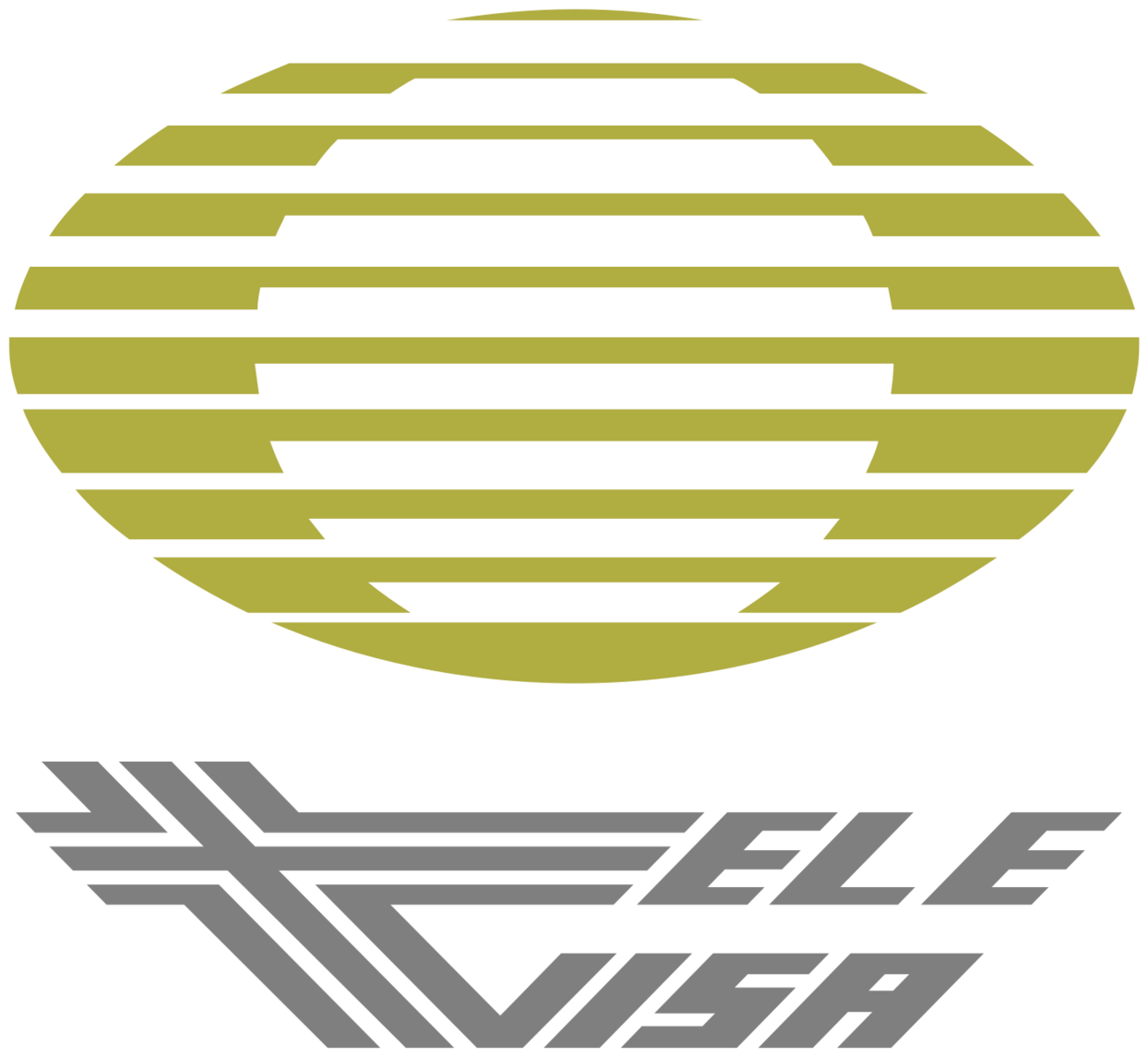
1973–1980

1981-1990

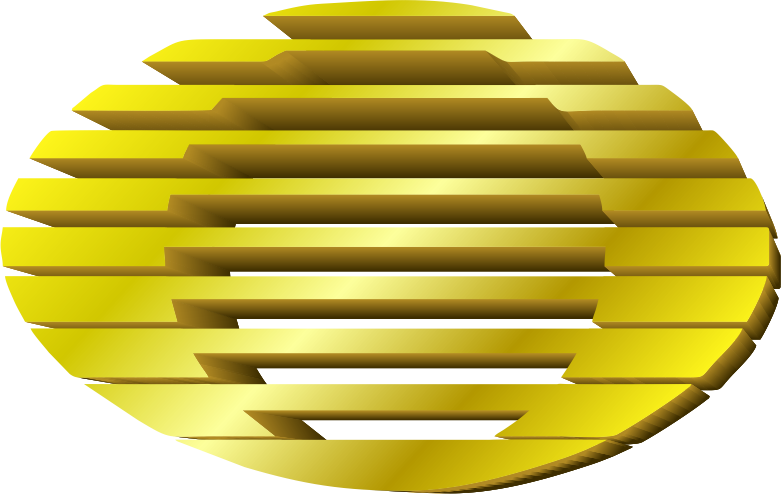
1994–2000

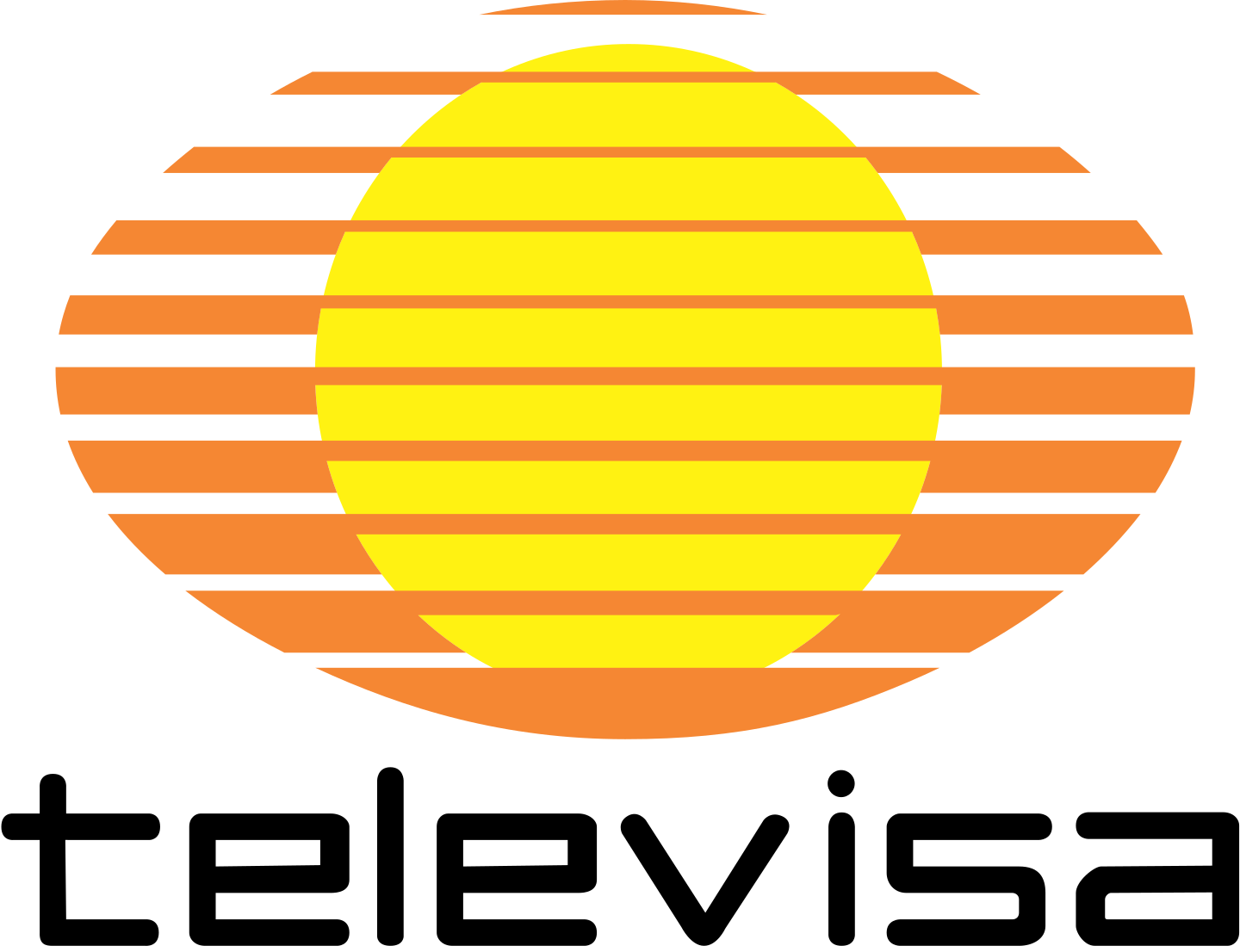
1990–2000

2016–present (orange version)

2016–present (dark blue version)

2022–present (currently used as a brand logo)
