= List of television stations in Baja California =

The following is a list of all CRT-licensed over-the-air television stations broadcasting in the Mexican state of Baja California. The state of Baja California has 25 operating digital television stations.

== List of television stations ==
RF	VC	Call sign	Location	Network/name	ERP	Concessionaire
16	1	XHENE-TDT	Ensenada	Azteca Uno (adn40)	29.3 kW	Televisión Azteca
26	2	XHEBC-TDT	Ensenada	Las Estrellas	38 kW	Televimex
24	3	XHCTEN-TDT	Ensenada	Imagen Televisión	20 kW	Cadena Tres I, S.A. de C.V.
23	4	XHS-TDT	Ensenada	Televisa Regional	38 kW	Televisora de Occidente
17	5	XHENJ-TDT	Ensenada	Canal 5	38 kW	Radio Televisión
20	7	XHENT-TDT	Ensenada	Azteca 7 (a+)	29.14 kW	Televisión Azteca
7	11	XHCPDO-TDT	Ensenada	Canal Once		Instituto Politécnico Nacional
14		XHCPAH-TDT	Ensenada			Sistema Público de Radiodifusión del Estado Mexicano
23	7	XHIDC-TDT	Isla de Cedros	Azteca 7 (Azteca Uno)	0.94 kW	Televisión Azteca
28	1	XHAQ-TDT	Mexicali	Azteca Uno (ADN40)	252.44 kW	Televisión Azteca
34	2	XHBM-TDT	Mexicali	Las Estrellas (N+ Foro)	180 kW	Televimex
17	3	XHCTME-TDT	Mexicali	Imagen Televisión (Excélsior TV)	150 kW	Cadena Tres I, S.A. de C.V.
14	4	XHBC-TDT	Mexicali	Televisa Regional	200 kW	Televisora de Occidente
18	5	XHMEX-TDT	Mexicali	Canal 5	200 kW	Radio Televisión
15	10	XHMEE-TDT	Mexicali	Nu9ve	200 kW	Teleimagen del Noroeste
7		XHCPAO-TDT	Mexicali			Sistema Público de Radiodifusión del Estado Mexicano
25	20	XHEXT-TDT	Mexicali	Azteca 7 (a+)	254.55 kW	Televisión Azteca
20	66	XHILA-TDT	Mexicali	Canal 66	107.49 kW	Intermedia y Asociados de Mexicali
21	1/7	XHFEC-TDT	San Felipe	Azteca Uno (Azteca 7)	1.02 kW	Televisión Azteca
28	1	XHJK-TDT	Tijuana	Azteca Uno (ADN40)	151.03 kW	Televisión Azteca
33	3	XHCTTI-TDT	Tijuana	Imagen Televisión (Excélsior TV)	132.148 kW	Cadena Tres I, S.A. de C.V.
23	6	XETV-TDT	Tijuana	Canal 5 (16.1 Nu9ve)	200 kW	Radio Televisión
15	11	XHCPDE-TDT	Tijuana	Canal Once (Once Niñas y Niños)	78.96 kW	Instituto Politécnico Nacional
32	12	XEWT-TDT	Tijuana	Televisa Regional	200 kW	Televisora de Occidente
9		XHCPAT-TDT	Tijuana			Sistema Público de Radiodifusión del Estado Mexicano
22	19	XHUAA-TDT	Tijuana	Las Estrellas (N+ Foro)	200 kW	Televimex
29	21	XHTIT-TDT	Tijuana	Azteca 7 (a+)	148.08 kW	Televisión Azteca
34	33	XHAS-TDT	Tijuana	Canal 33	400 kW	Intermedia de Tijuana, S.A. de C.V.
27	45	XHBJ-TDT	Tijuana	PSN	75 kW	Media Sports de México, S.A. de C.V.
21	49	XHDTV-TDT	Tecate	Milenio Televisión	300 kW	Intermedia Telecomunicaciones, S.A. de C.V.
