= List of television stations in North America by media market =

These links go to individual lists of television stations by the media market in which they are located.

== United States ==
Map of the 210 media markets in the United States

=== Contiguous States, Alaska, and Hawaii ===
==== DMAs ====
There are 210 Designated Market Areas (DMAs) listed by the 2025–2026 Nielsen rankings:

- New York (#1)
- Los Angeles (#2)
- Chicago (#3)
- Dallas–Fort Worth (#4)
- Philadelphia (#5)
- Houston (#6)
- Atlanta (#7)
- Washington, D.C. (Hagerstown) (#8)
- San Francisco–Oakland–San Jose (#9)
- Boston (Manchester) (#10)
- Tampa–St. Petersburg (Sarasota) (#11)
- Phoenix (Prescott) (#12)
- Seattle–Tacoma (#13)
- Detroit (#14)
- Orlando–Daytona Beach–Melbourne (#15)
- Minneapolis–St. Paul (#16)
- Denver (#17)
- Miami–Fort Lauderdale (#18)
- Cleveland–Akron (Canton) (#19)
- Sacramento–Stockton–Modesto (#20)
- Charlotte (#21)
- Raleigh–Durham (Fayetteville) (#22)
- Portland, OR (#23)
- St. Louis (#24)
- Nashville (#25)
- Indianapolis (#26)
- Pittsburgh (#27)
- Salt Lake City (#28)
- Baltimore (#29)
- San Diego (#30)
- San Antonio (#31)
- Kansas City (#32)
- Hartford–New Haven (#33)
- Austin, TX (#34)
- Columbus, OH (#35)
- Greenville–Spartanburg–Asheville–Anderson (#36)
- Cincinnati (#37)
- Milwaukee (#38)
- West Palm Beach–Fort Pierce (#39)
- Las Vegas (#40)
- Jacksonville (#41)
- Harrisburg–Lancaster–Lebanon–York (#42)
- Grand Rapids–Kalamazoo–Battle Creek (#43)
- Norfolk–Portsmouth–Newport News (#44)
- Birmingham (Anniston and Tuscaloosa) (#45)
- Greensboro–High Point–Winston–Salem (#46)
- Oklahoma City (#47)
- Albuquerque–Santa Fe (#48)
- Louisville (#49)
- New Orleans (#50)
- Memphis (#51)
- Providence–New Bedford (#52)
- Fort Myers–Naples (#53)
- Fresno–Visalia (#54)
- Buffalo (#55)
- Richmond–Petersburg (#56)
- Mobile–Pensacola (Fort Walton Beach) (#57)
- Little Rock–Pine Bluff (#58)
- Wilkes Barre–Scranton–Hazleton (#59)
- Knoxville (#60)
- Tulsa (#61)
- Albany–Schenectady–Troy (#62)
- Lexington (#63)
- Dayton (#64)
- Tucson (Sierra Vista) (#65)
- Spokane (#66)
- Des Moines–Ames (#67)
- Green Bay–Appleton (#68)
- Honolulu (#69)
- Roanoke–Lynchburg (#70)
- Wichita–Hutchinson (#71)
- Flint–Saginaw–Bay City (#72)
- Omaha (#73)
- Springfield, MO (#74)
- Huntsville–Decatur (Florence) (#75)
- Columbia, SC (#76)
- Madison (#77)
- Portland–Auburn (#78)
- Rochester, NY (#79)
- Harlingen–Weslaco–Brownsville–McAllen (#80)
- Toledo (#81)
- Charleston–Huntington (#82)
- Waco–Temple–Bryan (#83)
- Savannah (#84)
- Charleston, SC (#85)
- Chattanooga (#86)
- Colorado Springs–Pueblo (#87)
- Syracuse (#88)
- El Paso (Las Cruces) (#89)
- Paducah–Cape Girardeau–Harrisburg (#90)
- Shreveport–Texarkana (#91)
- Champaign–Urbana–Springfield–Decatur (#92)
- Burlington–Plattsburgh (#93)
- Cedar Rapids–Waterloo–Iowa City–Dubuque (#94)
- Baton Rouge (#95)
- Fort Smith–Fayetteville–Springdale–Rogers (#96)
- Myrtle Beach–Florence (#97)
- Boise (#98)
- Jackson, MS (#99)
- South Bend–Elkhart (#100)
- Tri-Cities, TN-VA (#101)
- Greenville–New Bern–Washington (#102)
- Reno (#103)
- Davenport–Rock Island–Moline (#104)
- Tallahassee–Thomasville (#105)
- Tyler-Longview (Lufkin–Nacogdoches) (#106)
- Lincoln–Hastings–Kearney (#107)
- Augusta–Aiken (#108)
- Evansville (#109)
- Fort Wayne (#110)
- Sioux Falls (Mitchell) (#111)
- Johnstown–Altoona–State College (#112)
- Fargo–Valley City (#113)
- Yakima–Pasco–Richland–Kennewick (#114)
- Springfield–Holyoke (#115)
- Traverse City–Cadillac (#116)
- Lansing (#117)
- Youngstown (#118)
- Macon (#119)
- Eugene (#120)
- Montgomery–Selma (#121)
- Peoria–Bloomington (#122)
- Santa Barbara–Santa Maria–San Luis Obispo (#123)
- Lafayette, LA (#124)
- Bakersfield (#125)
- Wilmington, NC (#126)
- Columbus, GA (#127)
- Monterey–Salinas (#128)
- La Crosse–Eau Claire (#129)
- Corpus Christi (#130)
- Salisbury (#131)
- Amarillo (#132)
- Wausau–Rhinelander (#133)
- Columbus–Tupelo–West Point–Starkville (#134)
- Columbia–Jefferson City (#135)
- Chico–Redding (#136)
- Rockford (#137)
- Duluth–Superior (#138)
- Medford–Klamath Falls (#139)
- Lubbock (#140)
- Topeka (#141)
- Monroe–El Dorado (#142)
- Beaumont–Port Arthur (#143)
- Odessa–Midland (#144)
- Palm Springs (#145)
- Anchorage (#146)
- Minot–Bismarck–Dickinson (Williston) (#147)
- Panama City (#148)
- Sioux City (#149)
- Wichita Falls–Lawton (#150)
- Joplin–Pittsburg (#151)
- Albany, GA (#152)
- Rochester–Mason City–Austin (#153)
- Erie (#154)
- Idaho Falls–Pocatello (Jackson) (#155)
- Bangor (#156)
- Gainesville (#157)
- Biloxi–Gulfport (#158)
- Terre Haute (#159)
- Sherman–Ada (#160)
- Missoula (#161)
- Binghamton (#162)
- Wheeling–Steubenville (#163)
- Yuma–El Centro (#164)
- Billings (#165)
- Abilene–Sweetwater (#166)
- Bluefield–Beckley–Oak Hill (#167)
- Hattiesburg–Laurel (#168)
- Rapid City (#169)
- Dothan (#170)
- Utica (#171)
- Clarksburg–Weston (#172)
- Harrisonburg (#173)
- Jackson, TN (#174)
- Quincy–Hannibal–Keokuk (#175)
- Charlottesville (#176)
- Lake Charles (#177)
- Elmira (Corning) (#178)
- Watertown (#179)
- Bowling Green (#180)
- Marquette (#181)
- Jonesboro (#182)
- Alexandria, LA (#183)
- Laredo (#184)
- Butte–Bozeman (#185)
- Bend, OR (#186)
- Grand Junction–Montrose (#187)
- Twin Falls (#188)
- Lafayette, IN (#189)
- Lima (#190)
- Great Falls (#191)
- Meridian (#192)
- Cheyenne–Scottsbluff (#193)
- Parkersburg (#194)
- Greenwood–Greenville (#195)
- Eureka (#196)
- San Angelo (#197)
- Casper–Riverton (#198)
- Mankato (#199)
- Ottumwa–Kirksville (#200)
- St. Joseph (#201)
- Fairbanks (#202)
- Zanesville (#203)
- Victoria (#204)
- Helena (#205)
- Presque Isle (#206)
- Juneau (#207)
- Alpena (#208)
- North Platte (#209)

==== TMAs ====
Here are the Federal Communications Commission's (FCC) top 100 Television Market Areas (TMAs) as of 2023:

- (1) New York, NY–Linden–Paterson–Newark, NJ
- (2) Los Angeles–San Bernardino–Corona–Riverside–Anaheim, CA
- (3) Chicago, IL
- (4) Philadelphia, PA–Burlington, NJ
- (5) Detroit, MI
- (6) Boston–Cambridge–Worcester–Lawrence, MA
- (7) San Francisco–Oakland–San Jose, CA
- (8) Cleveland–Lorain–Akron, OH
- (9) Washington, DC
- (10) Pittsburgh, PA
- (11) St. Louis, MO
- (12) Dallas–Fort Worth, TX
- (13) Minneapolis–St. Paul, MN
- (14) Baltimore, MD
- (15) Houston, TX
- (16) Indianapolis–Bloomington, IN
- (17) Cincinnati, OH–Newport, KY
- (18) Atlanta–Rome, GA
- (19) Hartford–New Haven–New Britain–Waterbury–New London, CT
- (20) Seattle–Tacoma, WA
- (21) Miami, FL
- (22) Kansas City, MO
- (23) Milwaukee, WI
- (24) Buffalo, NY
- (25) Sacramento–Stockton–Modesto, CA
- (26) Memphis, TN
- (27) Columbus–Chillicothe, OH
- (28) Tampa–St. Petersburg–Clearwater, FL
- (29) Portland, OR
- (30) Nashville, TN
- (31) New Orleans, LA
- (32) Denver–Castle Rock, CO
- (33) Providence, RI–New Bedford, MA
- (34) Albany–Schenectady–Troy, NY
- (35) Syracuse, NY
- (36) Charleston–Huntington, WV
- (37) Kalamazoo–Grand Rapids–Battle Creek, MI
- (38) Louisville, KY
- (39) Oklahoma City, OK
- (40) Birmingham, AL
- (41) Dayton, OH
- (42) Charlotte, NC
- (43) Phoenix–Mesa, AZ
- (44) Norfolk–Newport News–Portsmouth–Hampton, VA
- (45) San Antonio, TX
- (46) Greenville–Spartanburg–Anderson, SC–Asheville, NC
- (47) Greensboro–High Point–Winston-Salem, NC
- (48) Salt Lake City, UT
- (49) Wilkes-Barre–Scranton, PA
- (50) Little Rock–Pine Bluff, AR
- (51) San Diego, CA
- (52) Toledo, OH
- (53) Omaha, NE
- (54) Tulsa, OK
- (55) Orlando–Daytona Beach–Melbourne–Cocoa–Clermont, FL
- (56) Rochester, NY
- (57) Harrisburg–Lancaster–York, PA
- (58) Texarkana, TX–Shreveport, LA
- (59) Mobile, AL–Pensacola, FL
- (60) Davenport, IA–Rock Island–Moline, IL
- (61) Flint–Bay City–Saginaw, MI
- (62) Green Bay, WI
- (63) Richmond–Petersburg, VA
- (64) Springfield–Decatur–Champaign, IL
- (65) Cedar Rapids–Waterloo, IA
- (66) Des Moines–Ames, IA
- (67) Wichita–Hutchinson, KS
- (68) Jacksonville, FL
- (69) Cape Girardeau, MO–Paducah, KY–Harrisburg, IL
- (70) Roanoke–Lynchburg, VA
- (71) Knoxville, TN
- (72) Fresno–Visalia–Hanford–Clovis–Merced–Porterville, CA
- (73) Raleigh–Durham–Goldsboro–Fayetteville, NC
- (74) Johnstown–Altoona, PA
- (75) Portland–Poland Spring, ME
- (76) Spokane, WA
- (77) Jackson, MS
- (78) Chattanooga, TN
- (79) Youngstown, OH
- (80) South Bend–Elkhart, IN
- (81) Albuquerque, NM
- (82) Fort Wayne–Roanoke, IN
- (83) Peoria, IL
- (84) Greenville–Washington–New Bern, NC
- (85) Sioux Falls–Mitchell, SD
- (86) Evansville, IN
- (87) Baton Rouge, LA
- (88) Beaumont–Port Arthur, TX
- (89) Duluth, MN–Superior, WI
- (90) Wheeling, WV–Steubenville, OH
- (91) Lincoln–Hastings–Kearney, NE
- (92) Lansing–Onondaga, MI
- (93) Madison, WI
- (94) Columbus, GA
- (95) Amarillo, TX
- (96) Huntsville–Decatur, AL
- (97) Rockford–Freeport, IL
- (98) Fargo–Valley City, ND
- (99) Monroe, LA–El Dorado, AR
- (100) Columbia, SC

=== U.S. territories, commonwealths, and insular areas ===
- United States Virgin Islands
- Puerto Rico
- Guam–Northern Mariana Islands
- American Samoa
- Federated States of Micronesia/Palau/Midway Island/Marshall Islands

== Canada ==
Map of the 46 media markets in Canada

Markets are Designated Market Areas (DMAs), as listed at TV Radio World. Edmundston/Woodstock, NB is part of the Presque Isle, ME DMA.

1. Toronto–Hamilton–Niagara Falls, ON
2. Montreal–Laval, QC
3. Vancouver–Victoria, BC
4. Ottawa, ON–Gatineau, QC
5. Edmonton, AB
6. Calgary–Lethbridge, AB
7. Quebec City–Lévis, QC
8. Winnipeg–Brandon, MB
9. Kitchener–Waterloo–Cambridge–Guelph, ON
10. London–Woodstock–Wingham, ON
11. Halifax–Dartmouth, NS
12. Saint John/Fredericton/Moncton, NB
13. Windsor, ON
14. Sherbrooke, QC
15. Kelowna–Okanagan Valley–Kamloops, BC
16. Sudbury–Timmins–North Bay, ON
17. St. John's–Corner Brook, NL
18. Barrie–Orillia, ON
19. Saskatoon, SK
20. Trois-Rivières–Shawinigan, QC
21. Regina–Moose Jaw, SK
22. Saguenay, QC
23. Kingston, ON
24. Peterborough–Belleville–Trenton, ON
25. Rimouski–Matane–Sept-Îles–Gaspé–Percé, QC
26. Sydney–Glace Bay, NS
27. Red Deer, AB
28. Charlottetown, PEI
29. Rivière-du-Loup, QC
30. Thunder Bay, ON
31. Rouyn-Noranda–Val-d'Or, QC
32. Chaleur Bay–Carleton, QC/Campbellton–Bathurst, NB
33. Yorkton, SK
34. Prince Albert, SK
35. Terrace–Kitimat–Prince Rupert, BC
36. Pembroke–Petawawa, ON
37. Sault Ste. Marie, ON
38. Prince George, BC
39. Medicine Hat, AB
40. Lloydminster (AB–SK)
41. Dawson Creek, BC
42. Swift Current, SK
43. Kenora, ON

=== Territories ===
- Whitehorse, YT
- Yellowknife, NT
- Iqaluit, NU

== Mexico ==
Markets are listed from north to south.

- Tijuana, B.Cal.–San Diego, CA
- Ensenada, B.Cal.
- Rosarito, B.Cal
- Mexicali. B.Cal.–Yuma, AZ–El Centro, CA
- Hermosillo, Son.
- Chihuahua, Chih.
- Ciudad Juárez, Chih.–El Paso, TX
- Piedras Negras, Coah.–Ciudad Acuña, Coah.–Del Rio, TX–Eagle Pass, TX
- Nuevo Laredo, Tamps.–Laredo, TX
- Matamoros, Tamps.–Brownsville, TX–Rio Grande Delta
- Monterrey, N.L.
- Oaxaca, Oax.
- Durango, Dgo.
- Mazatlán, Sin.
- Tampico, Tamps.
- Poza Rica, Ver.
- Guadalajara, Jal.
- Puerto Vallarta, Jal.
- Mexico City, DF.
- Veracruz, Ver.
- Mérida, Yuc.
- Cancun, Q.Roo.
- Acapulco, Gro.

== Caribbean & Central America ==
=== Caribbean/West Indies ===
Markets are listed from north to south.

- Hamilton, Bermuda
- Nassau, Bahamas–Freeport, Bahamas
- List of television stations in Cuba
- Port-au-Prince, Haiti
- Santo Domingo, Dominican Republic
- San Francisco de Macorís, Dominican Republic
- Road Town, British Virgin Islands
- Oranjestad, Aruba–Willemstad, Netherlands Antilles
- Port-of-Spain, Trinidad–Scarborough Tobago

=== Central America ===
- Belize City, Belize
- San Pedro Sula–Tegucigalpa, Honduras
- San Salvador, El Salvador
- Managua, Nicaragua
- San José, Costa Rica
- Panama City, Panama

== Greenland ==
- Kalaallit Nunaata Radioa
- Sisimiut – Sisimiut TV 7 (NBC)
- American Forces stations
  - XPH 8 Pituffik Space Base
  - XPJ 8 Sondrestrom
  - XPH 13 Thule

All AFRTS stations are 0.100 kW.

== See also ==
- List of television stations in Canada by call sign
- List of Canadian television networks (table)
- List of Canadian television channels
- List of Canadian specialty channels
- Category A services
- Category B services
- Category C services
- List of foreign television channels available in Canada
- List of United States stations available in Canada
- Digital television in Canada
- Multichannel television in Canada
- List of Canadian stations available in the United States
- List of United States over-the-air television networks
- List of TV markets and major sports teams
- List of the Caribbean television channels
- Lists of television stations in North America
- List of radio stations in North America by media market
- U.S. broadcast television template
- Canadian broadcast television template
- Mexican broadcast television template
- Lists of local television stations in North America

== Sources and external links ==
=== Individual television station information ===
- FCC.gov TV Query Page
- FCCinfo.com
- TV Broadcasters of Canada
- W9WI.com – television station transmitter information
- fybush.com
- RabbitEars.Info

=== DXing and distant reception information ===
- DX Info Centre
  - Caribbean TV
- TVDXTips.com

=== International (Caribbean and Central American) station information ===
- CBC-TV8 – Caribbean Broadcasting Corporation (Barbados)
- SVG-TV (Saint Vincent and the Grenadines Broadcasting Company)
