= Active Measures (film) =

2018 documentary by Jack Bryan

- Film poster
- Directed by: Jack Bryan
- Written by: Jack Bryan; Marley Clements
- Produced by: Laura Dubois; Jack Bryan; Marley Clements
- Narrated by: Juliet Stevenson
- Cinematography: Neil Barrett
- Edited by: Andrew Napier
- Music by: Doran Danoff; John Macallum
- Production company: Shooting Films
- Distributed by: Super LTD
- Release date: August 31, 2018 (United States)
- Running time: 109 minutes
- Country: United States
- Language: English
- Box office: $52,620

Active Measures is a 2018 documentary film by director Jack Bryan. The documentary centered on Russian interference in the 2016 U.S. election, and looks at the many suspicious links between Trump associates and Russian officials. Additional topics covered included the life of Vladimir Putin, social media manipulation broadly, and the Cambridge Analytica scandal.

== Background ==
External videos
- Panel discussion on Russian influence in the U.S., featuring Jack Bryan and others, October 20, 2018, C-SPAN

The film suggests that Vladimir Putin is behind a 30-year history of covert political warfare. Soviet and Russian security services (Cheka, OGPU, NKVD, KGB, FSB) use the term "active measures" (Russian: активные мероприятия) for the actions of political warfare to influence the course of world events, in addition to collecting intelligence and producing "politically correct" assessment of it.

Director Jack Bryan is the son of Shelby Bryan. Born in New York City, he spent his early childhood at an Upper East Side, Park Avenue townhouse, but the majority of his childhood moving around the United States and Europe. Bryan attended Eugene Lang College within The New School as an undergraduate. Bryan was hired as a columnist for Quest, and became an Editor at Large. Bryan directed the documentary Life After Dark: The Story of Siberia Bar, released in 2009. Jack and Shelby Bryan lived in the same social circles of real-estate, Palm Beach, and the Upper East Side as Donald Trump.

Filming started 10 May 2017 and continued until September 2017.

On August 6, 2018, on CNN, Bryan said that Trump had sold five Trump Tower condos to a Russian mobster named David Bogatin in 1984. BBC Newsnight reported on Donald Trump's business links to the mob in March 2016.

On August 2, 2018, on MSNBC's Morning Joe, Bryan claimed that Trump resorted to Russian money, after bankruptcies at Trump properties in the 1990s made it hard to get loans from American banks. Trump's involvement with members of the Russian mob began in 2002.

On May 8, 2018, CBC Radio's Day 6 episode 388 reports that, after the bankruptcies, Bayrock Group, a real estate firm with Russian backing moved into Trump Tower. Bayrock's manager was Felix Sater, a convicted felon and childhood friend of Trump's former attorney Michael Cohen. "They went on their first date together" Bryan says. "They did a lot of business together."

The film includes interviews with people such as: Sheldon Whitehouse, Michael McFaul, John McCain, Evan McMullin, Hillary Clinton, John Podesta, James Woolsey, Clint Watts, Mikheil Saakashvili, John Dean, Jeremy Bash, Eric Swalwell, Toomas Hendrik Ilves, Daniel Fried, Stephen Holmes (CIA) as known as "Steven Hall", Nina Burleigh, Michael Isikoff, Craig Unger, John Mattes, Steven Pifer, and Asha Rangappa.

== Distribution ==
Active Measures premiered in April 2018 at the Hot Docs festival, in Toronto, and was released by Super LTD, a film distribution company on August 31, 2018. It began showing at Landmark Theatres Washington D.C., for example. It is also on iTunes, Hulu, Vudu, FandangoNOW, Google Play, and Amazon.

== Critical reception ==
On review aggregator website Rotten Tomatoes, the film has an approval rating of 81% based on 16 critics, with an average rating of 7.2/10. On Metacritic, Active Measures holds a rank of 68 out of a 100 based on 9 critics, indicating "generally favorable" reviews.

Frank Scheck of The Hollywood Reporter calls it "well researched and truly frightening ... One of the doc's strengths is the amazing number of 'gets' (onscreen interview subjects) procured by the filmmakers."

Todd Gilchrist of TheWrap says, "Most damning, though, is the sophisticated way that Bryan and Clements lay flat the history of technological attacks launched against oppositional regimes, and how brutally impactful they were because of attackers' profound understanding of the psychologies of the sociocultural ecosystems into which they were released".

Charles Bramesco of The Guardian writes, "this exhaustive documentary struggles to move past outrage ... Bryan synthesizes dozens upon dozens of articles for a more circumspect view of Russia's ongoing meddling in American politics, running the risk of overloading his viewers instead of, er, under-loading them".

Bruce DeMara of the Toronto Star says, "For anyone trying to navigate the labyrinth of personalities and events behind the ongoing investigation into Russian interference in the last U.S. presidential election, this film is a comprehensive and indispensable primer."

Hillary Clinton tweeted, "...a fascinating summation of the Russia story".

Owen Gleiberman, chief film critic for Variety writes "...Active Measures names the names and fills in the flowchart of Trump's corruption with gripping authority".

Alan Scherstuhl of the Village Voice felt that " 'Active Measures' Accidentally Makes Trump-Russia Collusion Sound Like Mad Propaganda[,]" and that "Bryan's case is less journalistic than propagandistic, his film assembled like an endless negative campaign ad[.]"

== See also ==
- Russia under Vladimir Putin
- Links between Trump associates and Russian officials
- Semion Mogilevich, Russian crime boss
- Russian interference in the 2016 United States elections
