= KZSD =

KZSD may refer to:

- KZSD (AM), a now defunct Spanish-language radio station (1050 and 1410 kHz) licensed in Loma Linda, California, United States
- KZSD-FM, a radio station (102.5 FM) licensed to Martin, South Dakota, United States
- KZSD-TV, a television station licensed to Martin, South Dakota, United States
- KZSD-LP, a low-power television station (channel 20, virtual 10) licensed to San Diego, California, United States
