= XHIJ-TDT =

Television station in Ciudad Juárez

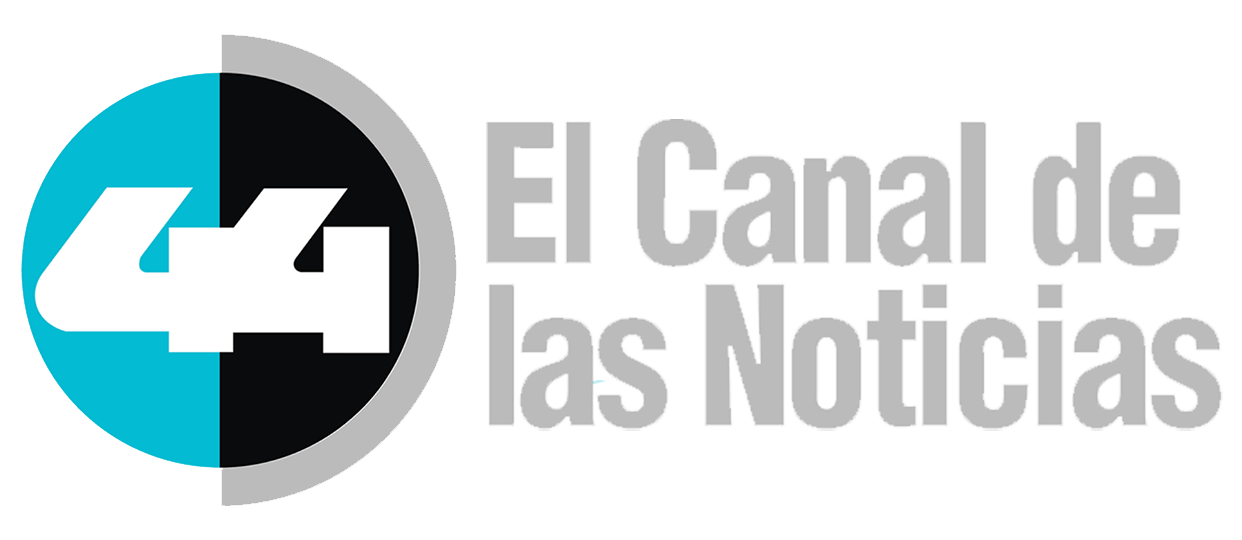
- Ciudad Juárez, Chihuahua; El Paso, Texas; Las Cruces, New Mexico; Mexico–United States
- City: Ciudad Juárez, Chihuahua
- Channels: Digital: 32 (UHF); Virtual: 44
- Branding: Canal 44

Programming
- Affiliations: 44.1: Independent; 44.3: Canal Catorce; for others, see § Technical information and subchannels

Ownership
- Owner: Grupo Intermedia; (Televisora Nacional, S.A. de C.V.)

History
- First air date: October 16, 1980
- Former call signs: XHIJ-TV (1980–2015)
- Former channel numbers: Analog: 44 (UHF, 1980–2015); Digital: 45 (UHF, 2011–2018)
- Former affiliations: Independent (1980–1984, 2000–2007); Televisa (1984–1988); Telemundo (1988–1993); Azteca 7 (1993–1997); CNI (1995–2000); Cadenatres (2007–2015)

Technical information
- Licensing authority: CRT
- Facility ID: 98776
- ERP: 150 kW
- HAAT: 162 m (531 ft)
- Transmitter coordinates: 31°42′16″N 106°29′55″W

Links
- Website: canal44.com

XHIJ-TDT (channel 44) is a Spanish-language independent television station in Ciudad Juárez, Chihuahua, Mexico, serving the Juárez–El Paso–Las Cruces metropolitan area. Owned by Grupo Intermedia and branded Canal 44, the station has had a variety of affiliations since signing on the air in 1980 and also produces programs such as local news.

== History ==
On June 23, 1980, Arnoldo Cabada de la O received a concession to operate channel 44 in Juárez, with callsign XHIJ-TV. Cabada had formerly worked at XEJ-TV as the news director. The station came on the air October 16, 1980. For the first four years of its life, XHIJ carried an entirely local program schedule, a rarity in Mexico given that most commercial stations were either affiliated to Televisa or relayed its national networks. Between 1984 and 1988, XHIJ would carry an affiliation with Televisa.

In 1988, the then-new Telemundo Spanish-language network in the U.S. engaged in rapid expansion, signing XHIJ and XHRIO in Matamoros, Tamaulipas, as affiliates. While with Telemundo, XHIJ raised its broadcasting power from 240 kilowatts to 1,129 kilowatts.

In 1993, Imevisión was privatized and became Televisión Azteca, but it only had one operating station in Juárez. Between 1993 and 1997, XHIJ carried some Azteca 7 programming. It would not be until 1997 when Azteca would bring its second Juárez station, XHCJH-TV channel 20, to air; it would then proceed to lose its Telemundo affiliation as well. In the mid-1990s, XHIJ added an affiliation with CNI, a then-new provider of national news programming, which continued through 2000. In 2007, XHIJ began to pick up programming from cadenatres in Mexico City, a relationship that continued until the network folded in 2015.

In January 2016, news director and anchor Héctor Armando Cabada Alvídrez resigned from his position in order to run for municipal president of Ciudad Juárez as an independent candidate; on election day, he won with 48 percent of the vote.

XHIJ-TV and KTSM-TV in El Paso share resources especially with violence in Juárez.

=== Expansion in Chihuahua ===
Intermedia fought for and won the television station in Chihuahua Capital in the IFT-6 television station auction of 2017, prevailing in the 13th round of bidding and paying 53.5 million pesos. The station, XHICCH-TDT 30 (VC 44), began transmissions in July 2018 from the Canal Once tower atop Cerro El Coronel in Chihuahua. Local programming from new studios in Chihuahua began on August 6, 2018.

XHICCH was approved for dependent repeaters in Ciudad Delicias and Ciudad Cuauhtémoc in July 2018.

== Technical information and subchannels ==
The station's signal is multiplexed:

Subchannels of XHIJ-TDT
Channel	Res.	Short name	Programming
44.1	1080i	XHIJ TV	Main XHIJ-TDT programming
44.2	480i	XHIJ TV	2-hour delay of 44.1
44.3	480i	XHIJ TV	Canal Catorce
44.4	480i	XHIJ TV	Intermedia Televisión

=== Analog-to-digital conversion ===
On November 1, 2011, XHIJ-TDT began broadcasting in digital on UHF channel 45, using virtual channel 44.

XHIJ has approval to multiplex its digital signal. Among its four digital streams is Canal Catorce, broadcast by agreement with the SPR and which is the only Mexican public television station available over the air in the area. It replaced UACJ TV, a service of the Universidad Autónoma de Ciudad Juárez, on 44.3 on October 20, 2015.

Due to the conversion from analog to digital television in Mexico (which was a phased process conducted by city), XHIJ shut off its analog signal on July 14, 2015, along with other Juárez stations.

In March 2018, in order to facilitate the repacking of TV services out of the 600 MHz band (channels 38–51), XHIJ was assigned channel 32 for continued digital operations.

XHICCH was authorized for the 44.1, 44.2 and 44.4 subchannels in March 2021. At the same time, World TV was replaced on virtual channel 44.4 with Intermedia Televisión on the Juárez station.

== See also ==
- Other Intermedia stations:
  - XHILA-TDT Mexicali
  - XHAS-TDT and XHDTV-TDT Tijuana
