= XHAS-TDT =

Television station in Tijuana

- Tijuana, Baja California; Mexico
- Channels: Digital: 34 (UHF); Virtual: 33
- Branding: Canal 33

Programming
- Affiliations: 33.1: Canal 66

Ownership
- Owner: Grupo Intermedia; (Intermedia de Tijuana, S.A. de C.V.)
- Sister stations: XHILA-TDT, XHIJ-TDT

History
- First air date: September 2, 1981
- Former call signs: XHAS-TV (1981–2013)
- Former channel number: Analog: 33 (UHF, 1981–2013)
- Former affiliations: El Canal de las Estrellas (1981–1990); Telemundo (1990–2017); Azteca América (2017–2022); LATV (2022–2023); Estrella TV (2023–2025)

Technical information
- Licensing authority: CRT
- ERP: 400 kW
- HAAT: 236.2 m (775 ft)
- Transmitter coordinates: 32°30′17.0″N 117°02′25.0″W

XHAS-TDT (channel 33) is a television station in Tijuana, Baja California, Mexico, known as Canal 33. It is owned by Grupo Intermedia (Intermedia de Tijuana, S.A. de C.V.), XHAS-TDT's transmitter is on Mount San Antonio in Tijuana.

XHAS began broadcasting in 1981 and initially devoted most of its time to rebroadcasting programs from XEW television in Mexico City. It joined Telemundo in 1990 and continued to broadcast its programming until 2017, when Telemundo parent NBCUniversal opted to take the network in-house. It then switched to airing Azteca América programming. For most of this time, operations were controlled by Entravision Communications through a Mexican concessionaire in which it owned a minority stake. The station was sold directly to Intermedia in 2025, after the company began providing programming in 2022.

== History ==
While XHAS began operations in 1981, its history stretched back to the late 1960s. In March 1968, Mario Rincón Espinosa, the head of Tele Nacional, S.A., requested and received a concession to build a UHF station in Tijuana. At this time, the callsign XHAS-TV and channel number 33 were assigned, with a visual effective radiated power of 105 kW. With the technical parameters set, Tele Nacional set out to build the station, and after some delays, it submitted the technical details in 1970. The next year, Rincón Espinosa was granted authorization to cut power in half; on several occasions in 1976, the Secretariat of Communications and Transportation (SCT) reached out to seek revised technical information and was not given a response. In July 1978, the Diario Oficial ran a notification warning that the SCT would begin an administrative proceeding to revoke the concession.

The station first signed on the air in the fall of 1981 after receiving a new concession that September. It originally operated as a rebroadcaster of Televisa's XEW television for all but two hours a day, when it aired a limited slate of Mexican movies and independent programs.

In 1985, XHAS began to air a local newscast titled Síntesis. It subcontracted a company, Logovisión, to produce the program, which got viewers' attention for its independence—and Televisa's attention for allegedly disrespecting Mexican institutions. Síntesis was regarded as more unbiased in its coverage than Televisa's newscasts; it beat XEWT's news in local surveys and reported news of voting irregularities in the 1989 Baja California gubernatorial elections. Televisa retaliated by pulling programs from the XHAS local block, the only time when it could sell its own advertising. The station began taking programs from Imevisión to fill the local window instead. In September 1990, given the uneasy state of relations between station and network, XHAS switched its affiliation to the U.S.-based Spanish-language network Telemundo; the Síntesis newscast moved from 10 p.m. to 11 p.m. as a result of the changes. The Telemundo affiliation switch also resulted in a letter from the SCT, asking it to explain its "arbitrary" affiliation change.

In December 1994, new management at XHAS fired the Síntesis team and built their own news department; after five months on local radio, Síntesis moved to XHJK and Televisión Azteca, where it remained for eight years. Entravision acquired operating control in 2000, resulting in a lawsuit from Telemundo, which claimed it had right of first refusal and wanted to purchase the outlet for $30 million. A weekday 6 p.m. newscast launched in 2002.

XHAS carried 109 Spanish-language telecasts of the San Diego Padres in the 2005 season.

Final logo as a Telemundo affiliate, until June 30, 2017.

In January 2017, NBC announced that it was hiring people for KNSD with the intention of launching a new Telemundo O&O station in San Diego, replacing XHAS-TDT (whose affiliation expired on June 30, 2017). Telemundo programming moved to a subchannel of KNSD (now KUAN-LD) on July 1, 2017, at midnight. At the same time, XHAS became an affiliate of Azteca América; the network, which had been affiliated with KZSD-LP, was carried on a subchannel of sister station XHDTV-TDT from March 15, 2017, until XHAS joined the network.

Logo as an Azteca América affiliate, from July 1, 2017, until November 2, 2022.

It was announced in October 2022 that Intermedia, owner of XHILA-TDT in Mexicali, would take over programming for the station on November 2, to be called "Canal 33".

In 2023,, XHAS-TDT became an affiliate of Estrella TV.

== Technical information ==
=== Subchannels ===
The station's signal is multiplexed:

Subchannels of XHAS-TDT
Subchannel	Res.	Short name	Programming
33.1	1080i	XHAS	Canal 66
33.2	720p	XHAS	News

=== Analog-to-digital transition ===
While the United States completed its transition to full-power digital television on June 12, 2009, Mexico made the transition over a period of several years four years later, XHAS-TV discontinued its analog signal on May 28, 2013, as all television stations in the Tijuana metropolitan area were required to convert to digital-exclusive broadcasts on that date as part of a pilot program; the stations were later ordered to resume analog transmissions until July 18, 2013, due to concerns about the interaction of the shutoff with state elections.

== Newscasts ==
XHAS-TDT presently broadcasts 7 1/2 hours of local newscasts each week (with 90 minutes each weekday); the station does not produce newscasts on Saturdays or Sundays. The station broadcasts an hour-long local newscast each weeknight at 5 p.m. and a half-hour newscast at 11 p.m. Previously, when the station was affiliated with Telemundo prior to switching to KUAN, the station aired newscasts at 5:30, 6 and 11 p.m. While it competes with the local newscasts on Univision-affiliated sister station KBNT-CD seen in the same timeslots, as the two stations share studio facilities in Entravision's building, XHAS focuses its newscasts more on issues affecting Tijuana (competing against locally programmed XEWT-TDT (channel 12)), while KBNT-CD focuses more on San Diego.

When Telemundo and XHAS parted ways, the newscasts on XHAS were renamed Noticias Ya Frontera (News Now Border), after the Noticias Ya series of news portals run by Entravision.
