= KZSD-LD =

LPTV station in San Diego

Translator of KGTV
- San Diego, California; United States
- Channels: Digital: 20 (UHF); Virtual: 10
- Branding: see KGTV

Programming
- Affiliations: see KGTV

Ownership
- Owner: E. W. Scripps Company; (Scripps Broadcasting Holdings LLC)

History
- Founded: September 25, 1997
- First air date: September 13, 2000
- Former call signs: K60GC (1997–2000); K33FZ (2000–2003); KZDF-LP (2003–2005)
- Former channel numbers: Analog: 41 (UHF, 2000–2018)
- Former affiliations: Independent (2000–2003); Azteca América (2003–March 2017); Laff (March–May 2017); MeTV (May 2017–2018)
- Call sign meaning: Azteca San Diego (former affiliation)

Technical information
- Licensing authority: FCC
- Facility ID: 57054
- Class: LD
- ERP: 7.3 kW
- HAAT: 585.5 m (1,921 ft)
- Transmitter coordinates: 32°41′46.6″N 116°56′10.3″W

Links
- Public license information: LMS
- Website: www.10news.com

KZSD-LD (channel 20) is a low-power television station in San Diego, California, United States. It is a translator of ABC affiliate KGTV (channel 10) which is owned by the E. W. Scripps Company. KZSD-LD's transmitter is located on San Miguel Mountain southeast of Spring Valley; its parent station maintains studios on Air Way in the Riverview-Webster section of San Diego.

As a stand-alone analog station affiliated with Azteca América and later MeTV, KZSD's broadcasting radius only covered northern and eastern parts of the city of San Diego and some adjacent suburbs (such as Poway and El Cajon). Therefore, the station was simulcast in widescreen standard definition over KGTV's second digital subchannel in order to reach the entire market.

The unusual numbering for the mapped subchannel in the past as channel 10.15 was in order to align it with KZSD's former cable placement on Cox Communications channel 15 (PBS member station KPBS which broadcasts on virtual channel 15 over the air, is instead carried on cable channel 11). Once XHDTV-TDT2 (later XHAS-TDT) assumed the Azteca América affiliation, KZSD-LP lost the channel 15 cable slot, but regained carriage on May 1, 2017, on Cox digital channel 808, when it assumed the MeTV affiliation in San Diego.

KZSD-LP was converted to digital in 2018 as a KGTV translator, allowing homes with issues receiving KGTV's VHF signal or only a UHF antenna to receive KGTV in some form.

== History ==
KZSD-LP's logo under its affiliation with Azteca.

The station was initially granted a construction permit by the Federal Communications Commission (FCC) on September 25, 1997, and its license was issued on September 13, 2000. In 2003, the station changed its call letters to KZDF-LP and became an Azteca América affiliate. San Diego was one of four markets to receive programming from both the U.S.-based Azteca América network and Mexico-based TV Azteca channels that preceded the American network's launch (Del Rio, El Paso and Laredo, Texas, were the others). Much of KZSD's Azteca programming can also be seen on TV Azteca-owned XHTIT-TDT (channel 21) or XHJK-TDT (channel 1), sometimes simultaneously with the U.S. network's broadcasts. McGraw-Hill Broadcasting purchased KZDF-LP from Laurie Mintz in 2005 and changed its call letters to KZSD-LP.

On October 3, 2011, McGraw-Hill announced that it would sell KZSD, along with its other television stations, to the E. W. Scripps Company as part of its exit from broadcasting. The deal was completed on December 30, 2011.

On March 6, 2017, Azteca América announced that it would move its San Diego affiliation from KZSD-LP to a subchannel of XHDTV-TDT on March 15, 2017, and to XHAS-TDT on July 1. A channel map shuffle that day saw Laff moved onto the re-numbered 10.3 from channel 10.2, which was converted to a loop of the latest KGTV newscast to air.

On May 1, 2017, Scripps took control of the MeTV affiliation on 10.2, along with its already-existing cable channel positions in the market, replacing KFMB-DT2 (which began carrying The CW in the market on May 31); MeTV also replaced Laff on KZSD-LP. The affiliation (which by contractual force requires it to reside only on a .1 or .2 subchannel) was sold by KFMB owner Midwest Television to Scripps in order to facilitate the change.

== Subchannels ==
This station rebroadcasts the subchannels of full-power KGTV.

Subchannels of KGTV
Channel	Res.	Short name	Programming
10.1	720p	KGTV-HD	ABC
10.2	480i	Bounce	Bounce TV
10.3	480i	Grit	Grit
10.4	480i	Mystery	Ion Mystery
10.5	480i	Laff	Laff
10.6	480i	Busted	Busted
10.7	480i	HSN	HSN
10.8	480i	QVC	QVC
