= List of radio stations in North America by media market =

Below is a list of radio stations in North America by media market.

== United States ==
=== By State ===
States

- Alabama
- Alaska
- Arizona
- Arkansas
- California
- Colorado
- Connecticut
- Delaware
- Florida
- Georgia
- Hawaii
- Idaho
- Illinois
- Indiana
- Iowa
- Kansas
- Kentucky
- Louisiana
- Maine
- Maryland
- Massachusetts
- Michigan
- Minnesota
- Mississippi
- Missouri
- Montana
- Nebraska
- Nevada
- New Hampshire
- New Jersey
- New Mexico
- New York
- North Carolina
- North Dakota
- Ohio
- Oklahoma
- Oregon
- Pennsylvania
- Rhode Island
- South Carolina
- South Dakota
- Tennessee
- Texas
- Utah
- Vermont
- Virginia
- Washington
- West Virginia
- Wisconsin
- Wyoming
- Washington, DC

Territories:

- American Samoa
- Guam
- Northern Mariana Islands
- Puerto Rico
- U.S. Virgin Islands

Other:

- Channel 6
- Sirius XM Radio

=== By callsign ===
In the United States, radio stations are assigned callsigns that either start with K (for those located west of the Mississippi River), or W (for those located east of the Mississippi River).

- AM radio stations by call sign (starting with KA–KF)
- AM radio stations by call sign (starting with WA–WF)
- AM radio stations by call sign (starting with KG–KM)
- AM radio stations by call sign (starting with WG–WM)
- AM radio stations by call sign (starting with KN–KS)
- AM radio stations by call sign (starting with WN–WS)
- AM radio stations by call sign (starting with KT–KZ)
- AM radio stations by call sign (starting with WT–WZ)
- FM radio stations by call sign (starting with KA–KC)
- FM radio stations by call sign (starting with WA–WC)
- FM radio stations by call sign (starting with KD–KF)
- FM radio stations by call sign (starting with WD–WF)
- FM radio stations by call sign (starting with KG–KJ)
- FM radio stations by call sign (starting with WG–WJ)
- FM radio stations by call sign (starting with KK–KM)
- FM radio stations by call sign (starting with WK–WM)
- FM radio stations by call sign (starting with KN–KP)
- FM radio stations by call sign (starting with WN–WP)
- FM radio stations by call sign (starting with KQ–KS)
- FM radio stations by call sign (starting with WQ–WS)
- FM radio stations by call sign (starting with KT–KV)
- FM radio stations by call sign (starting with WT–WV)
- FM radio stations by call sign (starting with KW–KZ)
- FM radio stations by call sign (starting with WW–WZ)

=== By frequency ===
In the United States, radio stations are assigned frequencies on both AM and FM bands; see Lists of radio stations by frequency for these lists.

== Canada ==
- Abitibi-Témiscamingue
- Calgary
- Cape Breton
- Central Ontario
- Cornwall
- Edmonton
- First Nations
- Fort McMurray
- Fredericton
- Grande Prairie
- Halifax
- Hamilton
- KW
- Kenora
- Kingston
- Lethbridge
- London
- Mauricie
- Medicine Hat
- Midwestern Ontario
- Moncton
- Montreal
- North Bay
- Northern Interior
- Okanagan
- Ottawa
- Ottawa Valley
- PEI
- Pembina Valley
- Peterborough
- Quebec City
- Quinte
- Rainy River
- Red Deer
- Regina
- Saguenay
- Saint John
- Saskatoon
- Sault Ste. Marie, Ontario
- Sherbrooke
- Simcoe County, Ontario
- Southwestern Ontario
- St. John's
- Sudbury
- Thompson-Cariboo
- Thunder Bay
- Timiskaming
- Timmins
- Toronto
- Vancouver Island
- Vancouver
- Westman
- Whitehorse
- Winnipeg

== Mexico ==
- Aguascalientes
- Baja California
- Baja California Sur
- Campeche
- Chiapas
- Chihuahua
- Ciudad Acuña, Coahuila
- Ciudad Juárez, Chihuahua
- Coahuila
- Colima
- Durango
- Guanajuato
- Guerrero
- Hidalgo
- Jalisco
- Mexicali, Baja California
- Mexico City
- Mexico
- Mexico State
- Michoacán
- Morelos
- Nayarit
- Nogales, Sonora
- Nuevo León
- Oaxaca
- Piedras Negras, Coahuila
- Puebla
- Querétaro
- Quintana Roo
- San Luis Potosí
- Sinaloa
- Sonora
- Tabasco
- Tijuana, Baja California
- Tlaxcala
- Veracruz
- Yucatán
- Zacatecas

== See also ==
- List of television stations in North America by media market
- Call signs in North America
