= Grupo Intermedia =

Mexican media company

Grupo Intermedia, S.A. de C.V.
- Company type: Sociedad Anónima de Capital Variable
- Industry: Mass media
- Founded: 1980; 46 years ago
- Founder: Arnoldo Cabada de la O.
- Headquarters: Chihuahua, Ciudad Juárez, Mexico
- Products: Television broadcasting, multimedia, restaurants, spas, visa center
- Subsidiaries: Fundación Arnoldo Cabada de la O

Grupo Intermedia, S.A de C.V. is a Mexican television company, located in Ciudad Juárez, Chihuahua, Mexico.

Intermedia was founded in 1980 by Arnoldo Cabada de la O, XHIJ-TV's founder and company owner.

== Owned assets ==
Grupo Intermedia owns various assets, including two television stations, a restaurant, a spa, a U.S. immigration visas center, two subnetworks, and a foundation.

=== Television stations ===
Callsign	Frequency / Channel	Location	Network Affiliation	Branding	Founded	Notes
XHIJ-TDT	45 (44.1)	Ciudad Juárez, Chihuahua	Independent	Canal 44, El Canal de Las Noticias	1980	Intermedia's flagship station and asset
XHILA-TDT	46 (66.1)	Mexicali, Baja California	Independent	Canal 66, El Canal de Las Noticias	1997	
XHAS-TDT	34 (33.1)	Tijuana, Baja California	Independent	Canal 33, El Canal de Las Noticias	2026	

=== Digital television subnetworks ===
==== Ciudad Juárez ====
These networks broadcast in XHIJ-TV's subchannels 44.2 and 44.3.

- 44 Alternativo
- Televisión Universitaria (Operated by Universidad Autónoma de Ciudad Juárez)

==== Mexicali ====
These networks broadcast in XHILA-TV's subchannels 66.2, 66.3 and 66.4.

- Cadenatres XHTRES-TV
- Canal 66 (Delayed)
- Milenio Television

=== Physical assets ===
- Café 44 (restaurant)
- Visas 44 (U.S immigration visas center)
- Santé Med-Spa (spa)

=== Foundation ===
- Fundación Arnoldo Cabada de la O
