= Brian Christie =

American journalist (died 2021)

- Born: Boston, Massachusetts, U.S.
- Died: January 17, 2021; San Diego, California
- Occupation(s): Broadcast journalist, talk show host, musician, and television personality

Brian Christie (died January 17, 2021) was an American television news journalist, talk show host, and anchor.

== Career ==
He was host and executive producer of The Boomer Show. For over a decade, he was a primary news anchor and reporter for CNN, CNN Headline News, and CNN International when it carried CNN's US prime time nightly broadcast.

During his years at CNN Christie anchored the network's The World Today, The CNN Prime News, and Newsnight. He was also in the anchor seat for the analysis and reporting of many significant breaking news stories including Hurricane Andrew, the O. J. Simpson Trial, the Persian Gulf War, and many other live national and international news events. Brian also hosted CNN's Your Turn. The late night call-in show was a fixture of the CNN overnight schedule for several years in the mid-1990s.

His career included stops as a primary anchor, reporter and host for WRAU-TV Peoria, WCVB-TV Boston, WKRN-TV Nashville, KTBC-TV Austin, KUSI-TV, and XETV in San Diego. Christie often won the television news ratings battle at CNN, and twice in San Diego (KUSI in the '90s and XETV from 2002 to 2007).

He had also hosted a number of nationally syndicated news, information and talk shows, including Emergency Call and U.S.A.M., an early morning CBN network show. He had hosted talk shows in Boston (The Good Day Show), Nashville (Nashville Magazine), CNN Morning News, San Diego (San Diego People), and Orlando (The Sundance Show) at WSWB TV.

Before his career in the television industry, Christie was on the radio in several markets including: WOCB Cape Cod, Massachusetts, WSAR Fall River, Massachusetts, WBUD Trenton, WLOF Orlando, and WLAC Nashville.

== Sources ==
- Wealth TV's The Boomer Show
- Brian Christie on IMDb
- Video clips of Brian Christie on Headline News
