= XHUAA-TDT =

Television station in Tijuana

- Tijuana, Baja California; San Diego, California; Mexico–United States
- City: Tijuana, Baja California
- Channels: Digital: 22 (UHF); Virtual: 19
- Branding: Las Estrellas (The Stars)

Programming
- Affiliations: 19.1: Las Estrellas; 19.2: N+ Foro

Ownership
- Owner: Grupo Televisa; (Televimex, S.A. de C.V.)
- Sister stations: XETV-TDT, XEWT-TDT

History
- First air date: August 14, 1990 (concession)
- Former call signs: XHUAA-TV (1990–2013)
- Former channel numbers: 57 (UHF analog, 1990–2013; digital virtual, 2006–2020)
- Call sign meaning: Tijuana

Technical information
- Licensing authority: CRT
- ERP: 200 kW
- HAAT: 229.3 m (752 ft)
- Transmitter coordinates: 32°30′7.9″N 117°2′26.8″W

Links
- Website: www.lasestrellas.tv

XHUAA-TDT (channel 19) is a television station in Tijuana, Baja California, Mexico, whose over-the-air signal also covers the San Diego–Tijuana region across the Mexico–United States border, affiliated with Las Estrellas. The station is owned by Grupo Televisa. XHUAA began broadcasting in digital on UHF 22 in early 2006 making it the second station in Tijuana (and at the time one of very few in Mexico) to have a digital signal (sister station XETV was the first).

XHUAA signed on in 1990; its original concessionaire was Radiotelevisora de La Rumorosa, S.A. de C.V.

== Technical information ==
=== Subchannels ===
Subchannels of XHUAA-TDT
Subchannel	Res.	Short name	Programming
19.1	1080i	XHUAA	Las Estrellas
19.2	480i	XHUAA	N+ Foro

FOROtv relocated from XEWT-TDT 12.2 in June 2019.

=== Analog-to-digital conversion ===
By then-current Mexican law, XHUAA was suggested to start broadcasting digital television by January 1, 2010, although this station was allowed at its discretion to start broadcasting DTV before law required it to, and XHUAA-TDT had signed on in 2006. The original assignment was channel 20, but the chosen channel caused issues to land mobile services in Los Angeles, prompting the FCC in the United States to request a channel change.

Due to the conversion mandate, XHUAA-TV shut down its analog signal on May 28, 2013 and again on July 18, 2013, due to issues relating to elections. Tijuana was the first Mexican city to start the analog to digital conversion in Mexico.

XHUAA retained its virtual channel of 57 after October 2016 because channel 2 would create a channel conflict with KCBS-TV over portions of San Diego County. On March 6, 2020, it moved to the lowest number available in Tijuana, from channel 57 to channel 19.

=== Repeaters ===
XHUAA operates low-power repeaters in Tecate and Col. Playas de Tijuana.
