= John Mattes =

American journalist

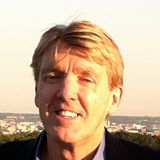
- John Mattes in 2014
- Education: University of Wisconsin, University of Miami
- Occupations: Investigative reporter, consumer advocate

John Mattes is an American investigative journalist who has won five Emmys, one Golden Mike Award, one Edward R Murrow award and 10 press club awards for exposing fraud and corruption in government. Mattes holds an advanced degree in Communication Research from the University of Wisconsin and a J.D. degree from the University of Miami. Before working for Fox, he served as a County Supervisor and city council member in Madison, Wisconsin and practiced law in Miami, Florida focusing on Public Policy Investigation.

== Journalistic work ==
=== Iran-Contra affair ===
While in Miami Mattes helped uncover illegal Contra gun and drug running in Central America and the role of Oliver North in the scandal. Mattes was one of the first persons to bring the Iran–Contra affair to the attention of Senator John Kerry. An aide to Senator Kerry at the time said “Quite frankly I don't think our investigation would have proceeded without John”. As a Federal Defender in Miami, Mattes found himself in the thick of the cloak-and-dagger incidents of the Contras and their allies. Mattes defended self-described mercenary whistleblower and freelance intelligence operative Jack Terrell from charges he had violated the U.S. Neutrality Act because of his Contra-supply work.

Ultimately the case was dismissed by a federal judge in 1990 on grounds that Terrell had not violated the neutrality act. In the course of legal discovery in the Terrell case, Mattes obtained stacks of previously classified documents about the secret Contra supply network. These he turned over to the Senate Committee on Foreign Relations and its Subcommittee on Terrorism, Narcotics and International Communications, headed by Senator John Kerry, which was then digging into Contra improprieties. The Kerry Committee report remains the most extensive inquiry into the Contra-CIA-drug connection.

=== US Senate Select Committee on POW/MIA Affairs ===
In 1992 Mattes served as Investigative Counsel to the United States Senate Select Committee on POW/MIA Affairs. As Investigative Counsel, Mattes conducted a nationwide investigation of bogus fundraisers who were claiming they would rescue POWS.

After serving as counsel to the committee Mattes left and began his own investigation of POWS abandoned in Vietnam. In his investigation he uncovered a group of CIA assets left in Prisoner of War camps for decades. Based on what he uncovered Mattes filed suit in 1995 demanding back pay and recognition for the group, known as the Lost Army Commandos. The commandos acted as spies and saboteurs who infiltrated Communist territory. Between 1959 and 1964, 450 South Vietnamese commandos who were recruited, trained and paid by the U.S. government for a secret mission known as Operation 34-Alpha were captured in North Vietnam and Laos. Some were executed, while others were imprisoned and tortured. The last commando held captive was released in 1988. The Defense Department initially refused to acknowledge the commando mission, but Mattes discovered 500,000 pages of classified documents at the National Archives. The documents included pay rosters indicating that the Army listed the commandos as killed in action when they actually were in prison.

The Army gave widows and survivors a minimal death payment of a few hundred dollars to close the cases. By declaring the prisoners dead, the Army no longer had to pay the families $2,000 a year while the commandos were in prison. It also kept the mission secret.

After a three-year court battle Mattes won a 20 million dollar settlement for the Lost Army Commandos. In addition, Mattes also assisted in winning asylum for many POW families.

=== ABC World News I-Team ===
Mattes served as an investigative consultant for ABC World News I-Team based in Miami. After conducting a number of investigations into bogus charities and fraud for the network, Mattes became the chief investigative reporter for the TV station WAMI-TV in Miami. His investigations included uncovering a multimillion-dollar kickback scheme at Miami International Airport, legal loan sharking in the auto title loan business, and financial ties between a local mayor and organized crime. From there, Mattes traveled across the country to become an investigative reporter for the nationally syndicated Uncovered TV in Los Angeles. His stories won him numerous awards and led one observer to suggest “They're the kind of stories where John might want to be starting his car with a remote control”

=== Investigative reporter ===
Since 2002 Mattes has worked as an investigative reporter in San Diego, California. Mattes has founded InvestigativeGuy.com, an online site dedicated to working for consumers and exposing scams. Since the site has been created, a number of the scams exposed by the site have been shut down by law enforcement. During his time in San Diego Mattes has won numerous Emmy Awards, an Edward R. Murrow Award and a Golden Mike Award.

=== 2016 U.S. Presidential Election ===
Since September 2016, Mattes has been investigating the interference of the Russian government in the U.S. Presidential Election of 2016. His investigation has been covered by numerous publications, including The Huffington Post, The New Yorker, and Buzzfeed. Mattes's work was also covered on The Rachel Maddow show on March 21, 2017.

== Suleiman attack ==
On September 6, 2006, Mattes received national attention when he was attacked by two people while investigating an alleged real estate scam. He had previously exposed the couple, Sam Suleiman and Rosa Barraza, in a series on mortgage fraud. He was injured with cracked ribs, bite wounds and cuts to his face. The attacking scene was caught on tape by his cameraman Dennis Waldrop. He was later interviewed by Bill O'Reilly on his show The O'Reilly Factor, as well as by television stations around the world after the video of the attack went viral. While Mattes recovered, the two attackers faced multiple charges.

One week after the attack, Mattes returned to XETV to do an investigative report on mortgage fraud.
