= List of television stations in Veracruz =

The following is a list of all CRT-licensed over-the-air television stations broadcasting in the Mexican state of Veracruz. There are 29 television stations in Veracruz.

== List of television stations ==
RF	VC	Call sign	Location	Network/name	ERP	Concessionaire
32	1/7	XHAZL-TDT	Cerro Azul	Azteca Uno (Azteca 7)	4.5 kW	Televisión Azteca
18	2/5	XHCRT-TDT	Cerro Azul	Las Estrellas (Canal 5)	28 kW	Televimex
25	3	XHCTCZ-TDT	Cerro Azul	Imagen Televisión (Excélsior TV)	10 kW	Cadena Tres I, S.A. de C.V.
36	1	XHBE-TDT	Coatzacoalcos	Azteca Uno (adn40)	50.58 kW	Televisión Azteca
24	2	XHCV-TDT	Coatzacoalcos	Las Estrellas (N+ Foro)	60 kW	Televimex
16	3	XHCTLV-TDT	La Venta, Tab./Coatzacoalcos	Imagen Televisión (Excélsior TV)	80 kW	Cadena Tres I, S.A. de C.V.
27	5/9	XHCOV-TDT	Coatzacoalcos	Canal 5 (Nu9ve)	60 kW	Radio Televisión
18	7	XHCTZ-TDT	Coatzacoalcos	Azteca 7 (a+)	50.4 kW	Televisión Azteca
20	13	XHCVP-TDT	Coatzacoalcos	Telsusa (Canal 13)	1 kW	Patronato para Instalar Repetidoras de Canales de Televisión en Coatzacoalcos, Veracruz
26	14	XHSPRCA-TDT	Coatzacoalcos	SPR multiplex (11.1 Canal Once, 14.1 Canal Catorce, 20.1 TV UNAM, 22.1 Canal 22)	20.51 kW	Sistema Público de Radiodifusión del Estado Mexicano
31	1	XHIC-TDT	Cofre de Perote; Orizaba	Azteca Uno (adn40)	239.46 kW; 30.72 kW	Televisión Azteca
17	2	XHAH-TDT	Las Lajas; Nogales; Orizaba	Las Estrellas (N+ Foro)	430 kW; 25 kW; 60 kW	Televimex
20	3	XHCTJA-TDT	Las Lajas; Xalapa	Imagen Televisión (Excélsior TV)	20 kW	Cadena Tres I, S.A. de C.V.
28	5	XHAJ-TDT	Las Lajas; Nogales; Orizaba; San Andrés Tuxtla (RF 39)	Canal 5	430 kW; 25 kW; 60 kW; 20 kW	Radio Televisión
33	7	XHCPE-TDT	Cofre de Perote; Orizaba	Azteca 7 (a+)	239.16 kW; 30.67 kW; 25.09 kW	Televisión Azteca
27	8	XHAI-TDT	Las Lajas; Nogales; Orizaba	Telever	430 kW; 25 kW; 60 kW	Televisora de Occidente
34	9	XHCLV-TDT	Las Lajas; Nogales	Nu9ve	430 kW; 25 kW	Teleimagen del Noroeste
19	13	XHTMVE-TDT	Xalapa; La Perla (Orizaba)	Telsusa (Canal 13)	68.6 kW; 6 kW	Telsusa Televisión México
35	14	XHSPRXA-TDT	Xalapa/Las Lajas	SPR multiplex (11.1 Canal Once, 14.1 Canal Catorce, 20.1 TV UNAM, 22.1 Canal 22)	64.35 kW	Sistema Público de Radiodifusión del Estado Mexicano
26; 33; 22; 29; 26	26	XHCPEO-TDT	Las Lajas; Cerro Azul; Coatzacoalcos; Mecayapan; Orizaba, Córdoba, Fortín	TVMás	247.18 kW; 50 kW; 50 kW; 25 kW; 10 kW	Gobierno del Estado de Veracruz
33	1	XHSTV-TDT	Santiago Tuxtla	Azteca Uno (adn40)	15.16 kW	Televisión Azteca
35	2	XHATV-TDT	San Andrés Tuxtla	Las Estrellas	22 kW	Televimex
32	7	XHSTE-TDT	Santiago Tuxtla	Azteca 7 (a+)	15.18 kW	Televisión Azteca
25	3	XHCTVE-TDT	Veracruz	Imagen Televisión (Excélsior TV)	25 kW	Cadena Tres I, S.A. de C.V.
24	12	XHFM-TDT	Veracruz	Telever (2.1 Las Estrellas, 5.1 Canal 5)	45 kW	Televisora de Occidente
29	13	XHTMBR-TDT	Veracruz	Telsusa (Canal 13)	10 kW	Telsusa Televisión México
