= XHBC-TDT =

Television station in Mexicali, Mexico

- Mexicali, Baja California; San Luis Río Colorado, Sonora; Mexico
- City: Mexicali, Baja California
- Channels: Digital: 14 (UHF); Virtual: 4
- Branding: Canal 4 Televisa Californias

Programming
- Affiliations: 4.1: Televisa Californias

Ownership
- Owner: Grupo Televisa; (Televisora de Occidente, S.A. de C.V.)
- Sister stations: XHBM-TDT, XHMEX-TDT, XHMEE-TDT

History
- First air date: October 1, 1957
- Former call signs: XHBC-TV (1957–2015)
- Former names: Canal 3 (1957–2015)
- Former channel numbers: Analog: 3 (VHF, 1957–2015); Virtual: 3 (2013–2016)
- Former affiliations: SIN/Univision (1960s–1989)
- Call sign meaning: XH Baja California

Technical information
- Licensing authority: CRT
- ERP: 200 kW
- HAAT: 106.7 m (350 ft)
- Transmitter coordinates: 32°36′41″N 115°29′39″W

Links
- Website: https://www.televisaregional.com/mexicali/

XHBC-TDT is the Las Estrellas Californias television station in Mexicali, Baja California, Mexico.

== History ==
XEM-TV channel 3 signed on from Mexicali on October 2, 1957. It was owned by a joint venture between Telesistema Mexicano, predecessor to Televisa, XED-AM owner Carlos Blando Obregón, and other partners. While its first full day of programs was October 2, it put out a test transmission on September 15 consisting of the Mexican flag and Independence Day celebrations co-produced with XED, and it signed on October 1 carrying the five-hour-long government report of Governor Braulio Maldonado from the Bujazán movie theater, using a remote control unit borrowed from sister XETV channel 6 in Tijuana. XEM was the first television station in Mexicali and the second in the region, after KIVA channel 11 from Yuma.

The callsign was changed to XHBC-TV several years after the station's sign on.

In 2014, Televisa Mexicali was consolidated with the rest of the Televisa stations in Baja California, bringing it under closer management to XEWT-TDT in Tijuana and XHS-TDT in Ensenada.

On March 26, 2015, all Mexicali television stations shut off their analog signals. XHBC-TDT remained on digital channel 47, initially mapped to channel 3 via PSIP.

On October 25, 2016, XHBC-TDT moved to virtual channel 4. Channel 3 had been nationally reserved for Imagen Televisión and its Mexicali transmitter, XHCTME-TDT.

== Programming ==
XHBC is Televisa's local independent for the Mexicali area. It carries local newscasts and locally produced programming.

Some of XHBC's resources and news reports are shared with sister stations XEWT and XHS; this is especially evident during the evening Las Noticias newscasts.

Like all Televisa local stations, its local programs are seen on the "Local News" and "Local View" channels of SKY México.

== Newscasts ==
On January 29, 2024, N+, the company responsible for news production for TelevisaUnivision in Mexico had reformed its regional news unit. As a result, XHBC and other Televisa Regional stations across Mexico were forced to eliminate all local news programming. In the case of Mexicali, the station has since simulcast all news programs from XEWT Tijuana.

Newscasts prior to cancellation on January 29:

- Las Noticias Al Amanecer
- Las Noticias 3 pm
- Las Noticias 5 pm
- Las Noticias 8:30 pm
- Las Noticias 10:30 pm

== Technical information ==
=== Subchannel ===
The station's digital channel is multiplexed:

Channel	Res.	Short name	Network	Programming
4.1	1080i	XHBC	Las Estrellas Californias	Main XHBC Programming

Televisa was approved to add FOROtv to six stations, primarily regional outlets, in northern Mexico in January 2018.
