= Asha Rangappa =

American lawyer and former FBI agent

- Born: Renuka Asha Rangappa; November 15, 1974 (age 51); Baltimore, Maryland, U.S.
- Education: Princeton University (BA); Yale University (JD)
- Children: 2

Renuka Asha Rangappa (born November 15, 1974) is an American attorney, former FBI agent, Assistant Dean of Admissions and Senior Lecturer at Yale University's Jackson School of Global Affairs, and has appeared as a commentator for multiple news networks. She was previously an associate dean at Yale Law School. Rangappa is also a member of the board of editors of Just Security.

== Early life ==
Rangappa was born in Baltimore, Maryland, to parents from Karnataka, India, who immigrated to the US in 1970. She told Elle that her parents "came under a provision where the government was specially looking for doctors," under the 1965 Hart-Celler Act. Her father is an anesthesiologist and worked at a Virginia army base. Her mother is an accountant. As a child she participated in beauty pageants.

Rangappa grew up in Hampton, Virginia, and graduated from Kecoughtan High School. She graduated cum laude with an A.B. from the Princeton School of Public and International Affairs in 1996 after completing a 136-page long senior thesis, entitled "The Rule of Law: Reconciling, Judicial Institution Building and U.S. Counternarcotics Policy in Colombia", under the supervision of John Dilulio. Following graduation, she was awarded a Fulbright scholarship, studying constitutional reform in Bogotá, Colombia. She graduated from Yale Law School with a J.D. in 2000 and completed an internship with the US Attorneys office in Baltimore. and took a clerkship serving the Honorable Juan R. Torruella on the U.S. Court of Appeals for the First Circuit in San Juan, Puerto Rico. In 2003, she was admitted to the state bars of New York and Connecticut.

== Career ==
In 2001, Rangappa began her FBI training in Quantico, Virginia. After graduation from Quantico Academy, she moved to New York City where she took a job as an FBI special agent, specializing in counterintelligence investigations, and became one of the first Indian Americans to hold the position.

In 2005, Rangappa left the FBI to get married and have children. She returned to Yale to become an associate dean of its law school. Currently she serves as Assistant Dean of Admissions and Senior Lecturer at Yale's Jackson School of Global Affairs. She has taught at Yale University, Wesleyan University, and University of New Haven, teaching National Security Law and related courses.

She has published op-eds in HuffPost, The Washington Post, The New York Times, Time, The Atlantic, and The Wall Street Journal. She has appeared on MSNBC, BBC, NPR, and other networks as a commentator. She served as a legal and national security analyst for CNN.

Rangappa is a member of the board of directors for the South Asian Bar Association of Connecticut, the Connecticut Society of Former FBI Agents, and the Connecticut Women's Hall of Fame.

== Personal life ==
Rangappa was previously married to a fellow FBI agent, Andrew Dodd, in 2005; they later divorced in 2011. She lives in Hamden, Connecticut, with her son and daughter.
