= XHTIT-TDT =

Television station in Tijuana

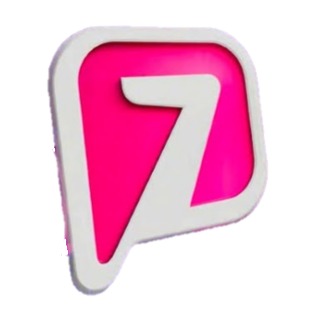
- Tijuana, Baja California; San Diego, California; Mexico–United States
- City: Tijuana, Baja California
- Channels: Digital: 29 (UHF); Virtual: 21

Programming
- Affiliations: 21.1 Azteca 7; 21.2: A Más+

Ownership
- Owner: TV Azteca; (Televisión Azteca, S.A. de C.V.)
- Sister stations: XHJK-TDT

History
- First air date: 1987
- Former call signs: XHTIT-TV (1987–2013)
- Former channel numbers: Analog: 21 (UHF, 1987–2013)
- Call sign meaning: Tijuana

Technical information
- Licensing authority: CRT
- ERP: 148.08 kW
- HAAT: 265.1 m (870 ft)
- Transmitter coordinates: 32°30′08.1″N 117°02′21.1″W

Links
- Website: TV Azteca

XHTIT-TDT (channel 21) is a television station in Tijuana, Baja California, Mexico. The station is owned by TV Azteca and carries Azteca 7 with a two-hour delay.

== Technical information ==
=== Subchannels ===
The station's digital channel is multiplexed:

Subchannels of XHTIT-TDT
Subchannel	Res.	Short name	Programming
21.1	1080i	XHTIT	Azteca 7
21.2	480i	XHTIT	A Más+

=== Analog to digital conversion ===
Due to the Mexican analog-to-digital conversion mandate, XHTIT-TV shut down its analog signal on May 28, 2013, and then again on July 18, 2013. Tijuana was the first Mexican city where the analog to digital conversion took place.

XHTIT retained its virtual channel of 21 after October 2016 because channel 7 would create a channel conflict with KABC-TV over portions of San Diego County.

=== Repeaters ===
XHTIT has five repeaters, four of them in Tijuana:

RF	Location	ERP
29	Playas de Tijuana	1.331 kW
29	Las Cumbres	.760 kW
29	Col. Santa Fe	5.93 kW
29	Cerro Colorado	4.798 kW
29	Tecate	9.137 kW

== See also ==
- XHJK-TDT
- KZSD-LP
