= XHJK-TDT =

Television station in Tijuana

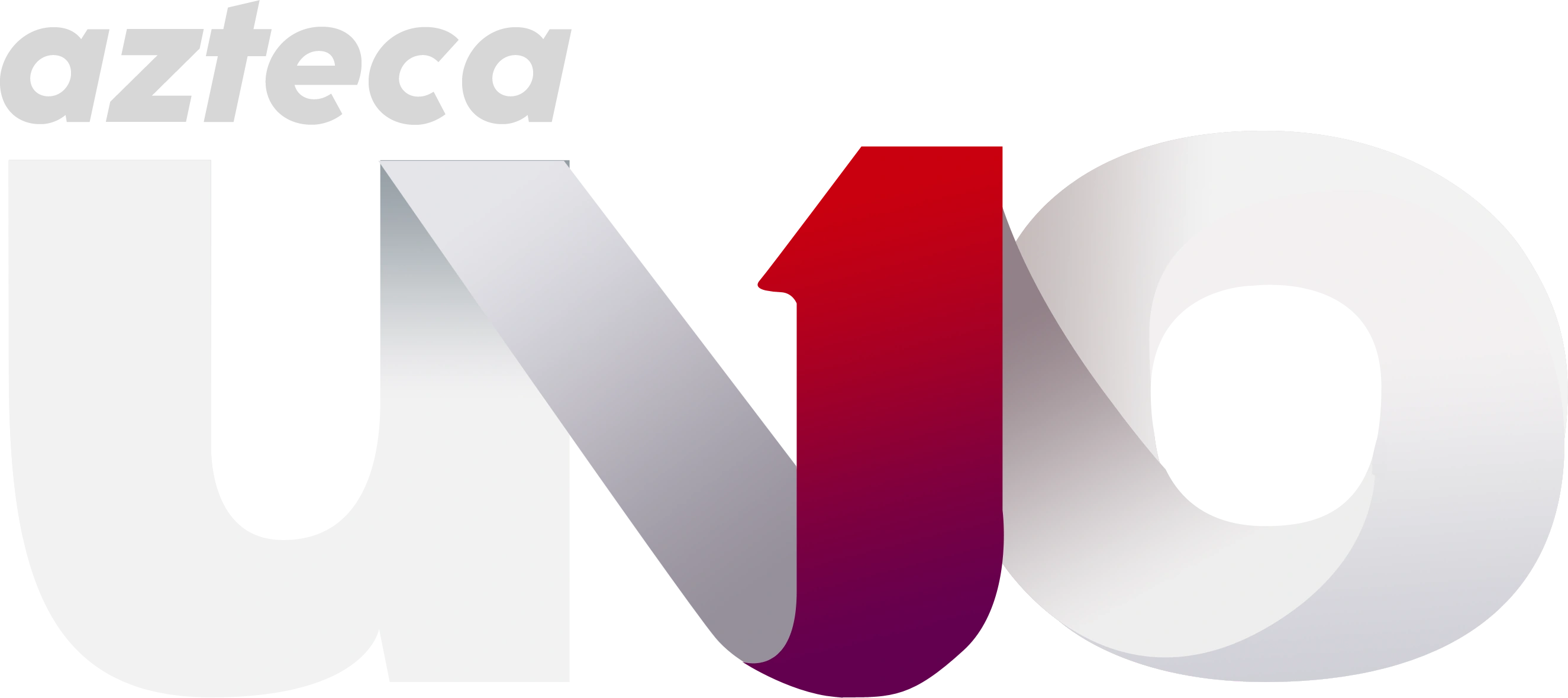
- Logo used since 2023
- Tijuana, Baja California; Mexico
- Channels: Digital: 28 (UHF); Virtual: 1
- Branding: Azteca Uno Tijuana

Programming
- Affiliations: 1.1: Azteca Uno; 1.2: ADN Noticias

Ownership
- Owner: TV Azteca; (Televisión Azteca, S.A. de C.V.)
- Sister stations: XHTIT-TDT

History
- Former call signs: XHJK-TV (1987–2013)
- Former channel numbers: Analog: 27 (UHF, 1987–2013); Virtual: 27 (until 2016)

Technical information
- Licensing authority: CRT
- ERP: 151.03 kW
- HAAT: 265.1 m (870 ft)
- Transmitter coordinates: 32°30′08.1″N 117°02′21.1″W

Links
- Website: tvaztecabajacalifornia.com

XHJK-TDT (channel 1) is a television station in Tijuana, Baja California, Mexico, that also serves San Diego, California, United States. Owned and operated by TV Azteca, the station carries the Azteca Uno network, with a two-hour delay except for live events.

XHJK received its initial concession in July 1981.

== Technical information ==
=== Subchannels ===
The station's signal is multiplexed:

Subchannels of XHJK-TDT
Subchannel	Res.	Short name	Programming
1.1	1080i	XHJK	Azteca Uno
1.2	480i	XHJK	ADN Noticias

XHJK was the only city where Proyecto 40 (now ADN Noticias) was modified to include local programming. Ultimately, local programming in each area was moved to A Más.

=== Analog to digital conversion ===
Due to the Mexican analog to digital conversion mandate, XHJK-TV shut down its analog signal on May 28, 2013, and again on July 18, 2013.

In 2016, XHJK moved from virtual channel 27 to virtual channel 1 as part of the nationwide move of the Azteca Trece network to that virtual channel. It was able to do so because channel 1 has generally not been issued to American stations since 1948. The network later renamed on January 1, 2018.

=== Repeaters ===
XHJK has five repeaters, four of them in Tijuana:

RF	Location	ERP
28	Playas de Tijuana	1.331 kW
28	Las Cumbres	.760 kW
28	Col. Santa Fe	5.94 kW
28	Cerro Colorado	4.811 kW
28	Tecate	9.145 kW

== See also ==
- XHTIT-TDT
- XHAS-TDT
