= XETV-TDT =

Television station in Tijuana

- Tijuana, Baja California; Mexico
- City: Tijuana, Baja California
- Channels: Digital: 23 (UHF); Virtual: 6, 16
- Branding: Canal 5/Nu9ve

Programming
- Affiliations: 6.1: Canal 5; 16.1: Nu9ve

Ownership
- Owner: Grupo Televisa; (Radio Televisión, S.A. de C.V.)
- Sister stations: XEWT-TDT, XHUAA-TDT

History
- First air date: April 29, 1953
- Former call signs: XEAC-TV (CP, 1950–1953); XETV-TV (1953–2013)
- Former channel number: Analog: 6 (VHF, 1953–2013)
- Former affiliations: Independent (1953–1956, 1973–1986); ABC (1956–1973); Fox (1986–2008); The CW (2008–2017)
- Call sign meaning: "XE" (ITU prefix assigned to Mexico); Television

Technical information
- Licensing authority: CRT
- ERP: 200 kW
- HAAT: 229.3 m (752 ft)
- Transmitter coordinates: 32°30′7.9″N 117°2′26.8″W

XETV-TDT (channels 6 and 16) is a television station in Tijuana, Baja California, Mexico, broadcasting programs from Canal 5 and NU9VE. Its terrestrial signal also covers the San Diego area across the Mexico–United States border. The station is owned by Grupo Televisa, and its technical operations and transmitter facilities are located at Mount San Antonio in Tijuana.

From its initial sign-on in 1953 until 2017, XETV broadcast English-language programming and operated business offices, and later a studio and newsroom, in San Diego. The station's American operations were managed by Bay City Television, a California-based corporation owned by Televisa. It was most recently an affiliate of The CW. XETV ceased its San Diego operations on May 31, 2017; The CW moved its San Diego affiliation from XETV's main channel to a subchannel of KFMB-TV (channel 8.2) the following day; XETV's cable channel 6 was transitioned to KFMB-DT2 on the same date.

== History ==
=== Early years (1952–1953) ===
Tijuana was the first city outside of Mexico City to receive a television license. A license to broadcast on channel 6 was granted to Jorge I. Rivera for XEAC-TV in 1950. Broadcasts were initially scheduled to start in November 1952, becoming the second cross-border television station, after XELD-TV.

XETV came into existence because of a technical quirk affecting stations in San Diego and Los Angeles. Even after the Federal Communications Commission (FCC)'s Sixth Report and Order lifted a four-year-long freeze on awarding television construction permits in 1952, signing on a third television station in the San Diego market proved difficult. While San Diego and Los Angeles are not close enough that one city's stations can be seen clearly over the air in the other, the unique geography of Southern California results in tropospheric propagation. This phenomenon makes co-channel interference a significant enough problem that the two cities must share the VHF band.

By 1952, San Diego (assigned channels 8 and 10) and Los Angeles (assigned channels 2, 4, 5, 7, 9, 11 and 13) already had all but three channels on the VHF band covered. Channel 3 initially had been deemed unusable as a signal because KEYT-TV in Santa Barbara would travel in a straight line across the Pacific Ocean (it would ultimately be allocated to Tijuana Canal Once outlet XHCPDE-TDT). San Diego's first two television stations, KFMB-TV (channel 8) and KFSD-TV (channel 10, now KGTV), which were respectively affiliated with CBS and NBC, were among the last construction permits issued before the FCC's freeze on new television station licenses went into effect. The UHF band, introduced by the FCC after the freeze, was not seen as a viable option; television set makers were not required to include UHF tuners until 1964 as a result of the passage of the All-Channel Receiver Act. Additionally, several portions of San Diego County are very mountainous, and UHF signals do not carry very well across rugged terrain.

Complicating matters, the Mexican authorities had allocated two VHF channels to neighboring Tijuana—channels 6 and 12. Since these were the last two VHF channels left in the area, the FCC did not accept any new construction permits from San Diego as a courtesy to Mexican authorities. One of the frequencies, channel 6, had originally been assigned to San Diego before the freeze; it was reassigned to Mexico as a result of the Sixth Report and Order. By the end of 1952, the call sign changed to XETV.

Although San Diego was large enough to support three television stations, it soon became obvious that the only way to get a third VHF station on the air would be to use one of Tijuana's allocations. The Azcárraga family and Rómulo O'Farrill, owners of Telesistema Mexicano (the forerunner of Televisa), quickly snapped up the concession for channel 6, hired Alexander Nervo as its general manager and signed XETV on the air on April 29, 1953. It is the San Diego area's second-oldest television station after KFMB-TV, which began operations on May 16, 1949.

At its launch, XETV was an independent station, broadcasting programs in both English and Spanish from its studio facilities in Tijuana. Channel 6 also established a business office on Park Boulevard in the University Heights section of San Diego, which handled sales accounts from north of the border. The Azcárragas chose to focus XETV toward San Diego and its English-speaking audience because there were more households in that side of the market that had television sets at the time than there were in Tijuana, which did not get its own all-Spanish station until 1960 when the Azcárragas signed on sister station XEWT-TV (channel 12). Owing to its initial bilingual, bi-national audience, XETV billed itself as "The International Station" during its early years.

=== Joining ABC (1953–1973) ===
Section 325(b) of the Communications Act of 1934, sometimes known as the Brinkley Act, prohibits any transmissions by any means to a foreign station that can be received in the United States without approval from the FCC. This provision closes a potential loophole to circumvent the Communications Act and other regulations of broadcast stations.

In January 1953, former ABC programming executive Alvin George Flanagan, who had become general manager of XETV, applied for a Section 325 permit to supply 30 percent of XETV's programming via microwave relay from San Diego. This permit was granted soon afterwards. Both this permit and further requests from NBC and DuMont to transmit their programming to XETV were then opposed by TBC Television, Inc. and KFSD radio, the applicants for San Diego's remaining channel 10 allocation. By late 1953, the FCC had failed to take further action on the matter, but it was rendered partially moot as KFSD-TV took the NBC affiliation when it signed on that September. XETV was finally granted special temporary authority to carry live coverage of an air show from Naval Air Station Miramar on November 22, which station management hoped was a good omen; two previous requests to carry one-off coverage of special events that year were denied. However, Flanagan moved on to manage KCOP-TV in Los Angeles in January 1954, and the request for a full-time Section 325 permit was dismissed for good on April 26.

ABC, in the meantime, was still relegated to part-time clearances on KFMB-TV and KFSD-TV. It intended to add XETV as an affiliate and applied for its own Section 325 permit to relay its programming, which was approved in November 1955. Pending the outcome of an appeal by KFMB-TV and KFSD-TV, ABC signed a stopgap affiliation deal with XETV which allowed it to carry network programming via a method known in the television industry as "bicycling". Programs were received at the station's San Diego offices, recorded on physical media (at this time, film or kinescope) and then physically transported over the border to the transmitter. This delivery method does not require FCC permission. The deal became effective April 5, 1956.

The original decision was stayed by the United States Court of Appeals due to the decision having been made in the absence of hearings by the FCC; after hearings were held, the FCC upheld the grant in October 1956. KFMB-TV again appealed the grant and the Appeals Court remanded the decision to the FCC. The Commission again upheld the grant on April 22, 1958; in November of that year, KFMB-TV again asked for revocation, based on an ad in Broadcasting which XETV identified itself as a San Diego station. In 1959, KFMB-TV once again complained about educational programming that it alleged was being transmitted to XETV from California Western University without a permit; the FCC explained that while the university had an expired permit to transmit the programs directly, it found the programs were being bicycled and took no action. ABC was required to apply for its Section 325 permit annually, with the FCC reserving the right to determine whether the continued affiliation was in the public interest.

XETV also received criticism from its American-based competitors for censoring programming that might have been seen as objectionable in Mexico. A regulatory lawyer representing KCST told The New York Times that XETV dropped network news coverage of drug trafficking across the border. The station also refused clearance of a 1969 episode of Marcus Welby, M.D., "Don't Ignore the Miracles", as it depicted an abortion in a Mexican border town at a time when abortion in Mexico was still illegal.

=== Transition ===
In 1968, as it had every year since 1956, the FCC renewed its permit allowing ABC to transmit its programming to XETV. Only this time, Western Telecasters, which owned the fledgling independent UHF station KCST (channel 39, now KNSD) at the time, contested it and began a lengthy battle to take San Diego's ABC affiliation from XETV. KCST claimed that it was no longer appropriate for a Mexican-licensed station to be affiliated with an American television network when there now was a viable American station available, and also asserted that XETV had lacked local programming that effectively served the San Diego audience. In May 1972, the FCC, siding with KCST, revoked ABC's permit to transmit its programming to XETV. The commission concluded that the primary factor in the 1956 decision—that allowing XETV to carry ABC served the public interest since there were no other available U.S.-based television stations—no longer applied with KCST being "ready, willing and desirous" to affiliate with the network. The commission could not go as far as to force ABC to affiliate with KCST, but acknowledged that the network was unlikely to dislodge the existing affiliations of KFMB-TV or KFSD-TV. XETV and ABC then went to the U.S. Court of Appeals, who upheld the FCC ruling; the station later sought relief at the U.S. Supreme Court, and was also denied.

XETV surrendered the ABC affiliation to KCST in two stages: daytime programming moved to KCST in June 1973, followed by prime time programs and all other shows (including children's programming and sports) by July 1, 1973. In spite of seeing ratings gains both nationally and locally, ABC was dissatisfied with having been forced onto a UHF station and stayed with KCST for only four years before moving to KGTV in 1977; KCST subsequently signed up with NBC at that time.

XETV once again became an independent station, with a standard program schedule composed of syndicated offerings, off-network programs, movies, and children's shows. In addition, because Mexican broadcast regulations did not limit commercial time (as FCC regulations did at the time), every Sunday, the station—in a forerunner to future changes in the U.S.—in effect, became the first station in North America to carry an infomercial, which consisted of a one-hour advertisement of listings of local houses for sale. As FCC regulations at that time limited television stations to 18 minutes of commercials in an hour, such a program could not have been run on U.S. television at that time.

In 1976, XETV moved its business operations to an office facility on Ronson Road in the Kearny Mesa neighborhood of San Diego; the station's broadcast operations, meanwhile, remained in Tijuana. Channel 6's Tijuana-based production and technical operations eventually moved from Mexico into an expanded wing of this facility. In the early 1980s, XETV produced a popular comedy program, Disasterpiece Theatre, which parodied campy low-budget horror and science fiction films by making fun of them as they aired, similar to the format of Mystery Science Theater 3000 a decade later.

=== As a Fox affiliate (1986–2008) ===
XETV's fourth and final Fox-era logo, used from 2000 to July 2008.

On October 9, 1986, XETV became one of the first stations outside of the original group of six television stations formerly owned by Metromedia (which had been purchased by Fox's parent company affiliate, News Corporation, earlier that year) to sign deals to join the newly launched Fox Broadcasting Company, becoming a charter affiliate of the network when it launched on October 6. Fox had little in the way of live programming at the time, so channel 6 recorded Fox programs in San Diego and then "bicycled" the recordings across the U.S.–Mexico border to Tijuana.

From 1993 to 1997, XETV also aired programming from the Prime Time Entertainment Network (most notably Babylon 5) on weekend afternoons, instead of the weeknight prime time slots that were recommended by the programming service due to the Fox programs that aired during the evening hours on the station.

When Fox acquired its first substantial live programming in the form of broadcast rights to the NFL's National Football Conference starting with the 1994 season, the network applied for a Section 325 permit as ABC had done to transmit its programming via microwave across the border. In the spring of 1994, McKinnon Broadcasting, then-owner of KUSI-TV (channel 51), filed a complaint with the FCC to block the permit. McKinnon cited the same arguments about inadequate local programming as KCST had. However, the North American Free Trade Agreement (NAFTA), which had entered into force at the beginning of the year, contained language that prohibited the FCC from favoring U.S. stations over foreign stations in Section 325 proceedings, as it had with KCST. The commission also changed its stance on XETV's local programming, ruling that serving the American public interest was irrelevant for a foreign station.

In any case, San Diego did not miss any of the inaugural season of the NFL on Fox, as Fox received special temporary authority to transmit the games to XETV live until the end of the season or when the FCC made its ruling. The FCC granted the Section 325 permit outright on October 28, 1994; NAFTA also extended the term for these permits from one to five years.

McKinnon appealed to the U.S. Court of Appeals for the D.C. Circuit. In the court case, Channel 51 of San Diego, Inc. vs. FCC and Fox Television Stations, Inc. (79 F.3d 1187), the permit was vacated and the decision remanded to the FCC, with the court ruling the commission had wrongly decided the issue of local programming was irrelevant. On November 1, 1996, the permit grant was definitively upheld. The commission ruled there was no evidence that XETV's local and public-affairs programming was inadequate. It also acknowledged the aforementioned provision of NAFTA which now prohibited it from considering whether requiring Fox to affiliate with a U.S.-based station was "possible or desirable". That same year, the station became a Grupo Televisa-owned property outright after the Azcárragas transferred the ownership of XETV to their family-run, Mexico City-based multimedia company.

In 1999, the station constructed a new 25,000-square-foot (2,300 m^{2}), three-story facility at the Ronson Road studio grounds to house a newsroom and production studios for a planned news operation that launched in December of that year. The one-story building that was located adjacent to the new facility, where the station's offices were based (which continued to house sales and management offices after the new facility was completed) was not large enough to house a fully staffed news department; the offices for XETV's production, promotions, and engineering departments were also relocated to the new building.

In October 2001, Grupo Televisa entered into a joint sales and programming agreement with Entravision Communications. Under this agreement, Entravision, which already operated UPN affiliate XHUPN-TV (channel 49, now Milenio Televisión affiliate XHDTV-TDT) under a local marketing agreement, took over the management of XETV and consolidated XHUPN's operations into XETV's facilities. The agreement expired in 2006; by 2007, Televisa, through Bay City Television, had retaken full control of XETV's operations.

=== As a CW affiliate (2008–2017) ===
XETV's former logo, used from August 1, 2008, to December 31, 2015.

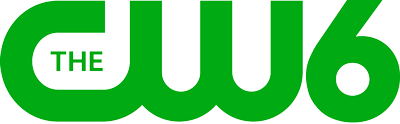
XETV's former logo as "CW6" from January 1, 2016, to May 30, 2017.

During a seminar by Sam Zell on March 25, 2008, it was announced that Tribune Broadcasting (which Zell had acquired the previous year as part of his takeover of corporate parent Tribune Company) had signed an affiliation agreement with Fox for its San Diego CW affiliate KSWB-TV (channel 69). Fox cited concerns with having its programming airing on a Mexican-licensed station, even though XETV had been with the network since Fox's inception and had broadcast its programming almost entirely in English for over half a century. This caught XETV station management off guard as officials were unaware about the pending affiliation switch until the announcement was made public. This affiliation switch came six years after its sister stations in the McAllen and Laredo areas of Texas were stripped of their Fox affiliations due to similar concerns.

The fate of both XETV and the CW affiliation for the San Diego market remained unclear, with Bay City Television/Grupo Televisa even reportedly considering filing a lawsuit to prevent the switch on the grounds that it would violate XETV's affiliation contract with Fox, which was not set to expire until 2010. This uncertainty was resolved on July 2, 2008, when channel 6 announced that it had signed an affiliation agreement with The CW. The station began dropping on-air references to Fox just over two weeks later on July 19, 2008, rebranding itself as San Diego 6. The affiliation swap officially took place two weeks afterward on August 1, ending XETV's 22-year association with Fox – with channel 6 joining The CW, while the Fox affiliation moved over to KSWB. XETV, upon switching networks, replaced KSWB-TV on DirecTV as a default affiliate in the few areas of the western United States where a CW-affiliated station is not receivable over-the-air or through cable television. The CW branding was minimized to a small CW logo in the San Diego 6 logo for news programs and displayed full size otherwise; additionally, it was rendered a bright blue (matching the station logo's color scheme) instead of its customary green.

On April 29, 2013, XETV celebrated its 60th anniversary of broadcasting. The station's morning newscast provided special coverage of the festivities, including separate proclamations of "XETV Channel 6 Day" by the San Diego City Council and San Diego County Board of Supervisors (the latter made on April 30 to general manager Chuck Dunning and chief financial officer Rodrigo Salazar). A special segment of the newscast that was dedicated to the anniversary was broadcast in black-and-white (the standard for broadcast television in 1953) with news anchors dressed in clothing and hairstyles from that period reporting on the major news and entertainment stories of 1953 and giving a contemporary weather forecast with paper graphics pasted on a hand-drawn weather map. On January 1, 2016, XETV changed its branding to fit The CW's station branding standardizations, identifying itself as "CW 6".

=== U.S. operation closure ===
On January 18, 2017, KFMB-TV announced that it would begin to carry CW programming on one of its digital subchannels. XETV general manager Chuck Dunning would later admit to the San Diego Union-Tribune that the reason for The CW's departure from his station was a failure of the two sides to reach a new affiliation agreement to replace the deal that was to expire that September; that lack of resolution prompted The CW to explore other options in the San Diego market.

The announcement of The CW's move to KFMB left XETV's future in question, with a station spokesperson stating on the day of the announcement that the station was evaluating its options. The station would reveal its plans on January 26; on that date, it announced that news programming on XETV would be discontinued following the conclusion of the 10 p.m. newscast on March 31, 2017. Then, at midnight on May 31 and at the network's request, the CW affiliation moved to KFMB-TV's 8.2 subchannel. KFMB-TV also purchased substantially all of XETV's syndicated program inventory, with the exception of Weekend Marketplace (which is no longer seen at all in San Diego), to run on the new subchannel, which it branded as The CW San Diego. XETV then moved Canal 5 programming (which moved from XHBJ-TDT (channel 45) in 2012) from its 6.2 subchannel to its main 6.1 subchannel, making the station a full-time Spanish-language outlet for the first time in its history. XETV had initially indicated it would transmit the Gala TV network, already seen in the Tijuana/San Diego area on XHBJ, but later retracted that statement.

Bay City Television, the Televisa subsidiary which operated XETV from San Diego, concurrently ceased operations on May 31; unusually, the same repeat episode of The King of Queens that ended XETV's run as an English-language station near midnight local time, launched KFMB-DT2's run as a CW affiliate three minutes later. By Dunning's estimate, about 150 full-time, part-time, and freelance staffers were laid off between the closure of the news department on March 31 and the corporate shutdown. In addition to ending channel 6's affiliation with The CW three months earlier than scheduled, the closure of Bay City Television concluded XETV's 64-year history of serving San Diego with English-language programming; the move left MyNetworkTV affiliate XHDTV-TDT as the sole Mexican-licensed station providing English-language programming to the San Diego market until just over a year later in September 2018, when it was replaced with Milenio Televisión. After XHDTV switched to Spanish-language programming, XHRIO-TDT in the Rio Grande Valley was the only Mexican-licensed outlet airing English-language programming, before the station shut down four years later in December 2021.

== Special broadcast authority ==
Because XETV-TDT is licensed to Tijuana by the Mexican government, it is not covered under the FCC's must carry rules. This means that local cable providers are not required to carry XETV-TDT, even if the television station requests to be carried under this provision. As an English-language station XETV had been carried by Cox Communications, Charter Spectrum and AT&T U-verse in San Diego, all on channel 6. KFMB-TV's "The CW San Diego" has replaced XETV on the American cable systems, as well as satellite television providers DirecTV and Dish Network. XETV is carried by all Mexican cable systems in its coverage area, as carriage of local broadcast stations is mandated by the Federal Telecommunications Institute (IFT).

While XETV's primary programming feed had been almost entirely in English from the 1950s until 2017, XETV also complied with Mexican broadcasting laws, which include clauses that are different from those in the United States. It identified every 30 minutes; started its legal broadcast day with the Mexican national anthem "El Himno Nacional Mexicano" at 5 a.m. six days a week and 6 a.m. on Sundays; and it aired public service announcements and political advertising required of all Mexican stations. At sign-on, it featured a technical disclaimer which had been read in Spanish and English dating back to channel 6's days as a Fox affiliate, and it also played the national anthem of the United States, "The Star-Spangled Banner", prior to the disclaimer until around March 2015.

XETV's production operations were based in the United States from the mid-1990s until Bay City Television's closure. The station's production, news and sales operations were owned by Bay City; Televisa controls the master control and transmitter facility on Mount San Antonio in Tijuana. Local programming between San Diego and Mount San Antonio was fed by way of microwave link, and network and syndicated shows were disseminated via satellite. By Bay City's closure, XETV had no local programs which originated from Tijuana.

== Programming ==
Prior to the CW disaffiliation, syndicated programs broadcast by XETV (as of September 2016) included Maury, Seinfeld, The Insider, Rules of Engagement, The Doctors and 2 Broke Girls. As the San Diego affiliate of The CW, XETV-TDT cleared the network's entire programming schedule on digital channel 6.1 until May 30, 2017, when some of these shows carried over to KFMB's The CW San Diego subchannel.

Prior to the cancellation of its weekend morning newscasts in March 2017, the station aired The CW's children's program blocks—The CW4Kids/Toonzai, Vortexx and, from September 2014 onward, One Magnificent Morning—in two blocks on Saturday mornings: the block's first three hours ran from 5 to 8 a.m. (two hours earlier than the timeslot recommended for the programs in that portion of the block to air in all time zones) and the final two hours airing after the newscast from 10 a.m. to noon (which air in pattern with the rest of the country); XETV began airing One Magnificent Morning in its network-recommended time period (7 a.m. to noon) on March 11, 2017, following the phaseout of the station's weekend newscasts in preparation for its disaffiliation from The CW. Though the station met the educational programming guidelines of the United States with the One Magnificent Morning blocks, XETV, being a Mexican-licensed station, is not required to meet the United States' broadcasting regulations.

As the Tijuana transmitter of Canal 5, XETV-TDT clears the entire network schedule on channel 6.1 and formerly on digital subchannel 6.2. Children's programming includes Spanish-dubbed versions of Nickelodeon's The Loud House, iCarly, SpongeBob SquarePants, The Fairly OddParents and The Penguins of Madagascar, as well as original Televisa programs such as its animated version of El Chavo along with the Cartoon Network original series La CQ. Other programming includes a prime time program block called PM, as well as mostly Spanish-dubbed versions of current and recent American shows (such as Malcolm in the Middle and Law & Order: Special Victims Unit) and the boxing program Sabados de BOX.

Most programs from Canal 5 that air on XETV have an audio simulcast in their original English language, and are accessible to those TVs with SAP (Second Audio Program) capability.

== News operation ==
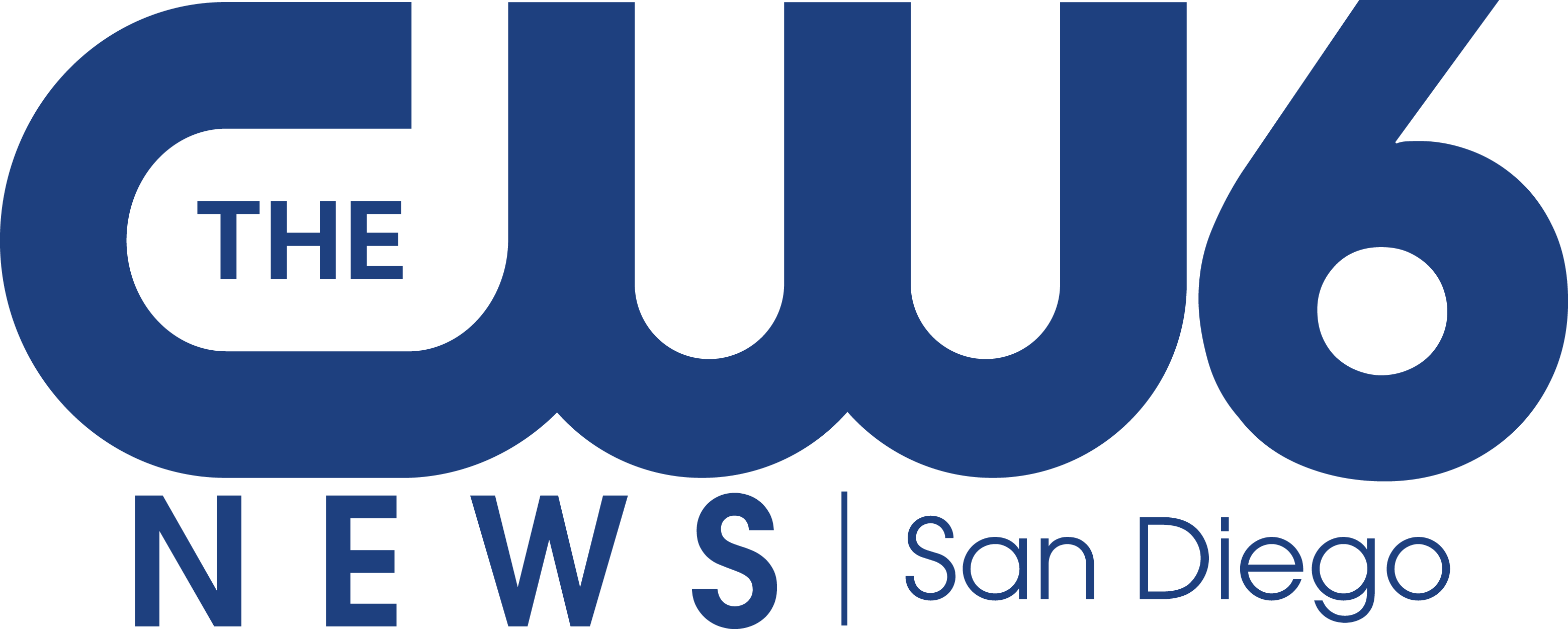
Final CW6 News logo, used from December 31, 2015, to March 31, 2017.

XETV had originally carried a local newscast from the station's sign-on in 1953 until its news department was shut down in 1967 (Lionel Van Deerlin, later a congressman representing San Diego in the U.S. House of Representatives, served as news director during XETV's early years). In 1980, during its tenure as an independent station, XETV began running local news updates throughout the day; these continued to air until several months prior to the station's affiliation with Fox in October 1986. Although then-general manager Martin Colby originally stated that XETV would not offer a newscast, in response to then-Fox President Barry Diller's comments during the 1991 Television Critics Association Convention in pushing for Fox's affiliates to produce local newscasts that the network "won't tolerate any affiliate that is not in the news business", XETV began reconsidering the possibility of launching a news department.

The station would not resume news programming until the establishment of an in-house news department – based out of the satellite facility at the Ronson Road studios – on December 27, 1999, when it debuted a 35-minute newscast at 10 p.m.; the program competed against an established prime time newscast on KUSI-TV and another newly launched 10 p.m. newscast on KSWB-TV that launched three months earlier in September 1999. Much of the news department's original on-air staff consisted of younger anchors and reporters (most of whom were in their early 30s, with a median staff age of 32) and its story content incorporated more sensationalistic feature reporting designed to appeal to Fox's young-skewing demographic. In September 2000, the station expanded its news programming with the debut of a three-hour weekday morning newscast – originally titled Fox in the Morning (later renamed San Diego 6 News in the Morning in August 2008, Wake Up San Diego in November 2014 and finally CW6 News in the Morning in January 2016) – from 6 to 9 a.m., and a half-hour newscast at noon.

After the station appointed Richard Doutre Jones as its vice president and general manager in the fall of 2001, XETV overhauled its news presentation in January 2002, adopting a more traditional style mixed with faster story pacing and investigative reports. The station also hired older and more experienced journalists to its on-air staff, including main co-anchor Brian Christie, assignment reporter Terry Burhans and entertainment reporter Fred Saxon, all of whom previously worked at rival KUSI. In addition, the flagship prime time newscast was expanded to one hour, and Fox in the Morning was restructured from a traditional newscast to an infotainment format; the noon was also cancelled and replaced with syndicated programming. For most of its existence, the station's news department usually placed last among the San Diego market's English language television news operations. As a Fox affiliate, the 10 p.m. newscast typically rotated with KSWB's prime time newscast as the top-rated local newscast during the 10 p.m. half-hour, though both programs were usually beaten by the longer-established KUSI News at Ten for the full one-hour time period.

On September 5, 2006, XETV's news team gained national attention, when investigative reporter John Mattes was badly beaten by Sam Suleiman and Rosa Barraza, a husband-and-wife team accused of perpetrating a real estate scam who were being investigated by Mattes. The incident was captured on videotape and aired on many news programs throughout the nation. On January 20, 2007, XETV debuted a two-hour edition of its morning newscast on Saturday and Sundays; the programs originally aired at 7 a.m., but were moved to 8 a.m. after the CW affiliation switch. From the station's August 2008 switch until the March 2017 closure of their news department, XETV was one of only five CW affiliates with a local newscast on weekend mornings (along with KTLA in Los Angeles, KMAX-TV in Sacramento, WISH-TV in Indianapolis and WPIX in New York City).

Upon switching to The CW on August 1, 2008, XETV debuted the 11-minute 11@11 newscast on weeknights, becoming the only evening newscast in the traditional late news timeslot (11 p.m. Pacific time on the California side of the market) to air on a CW affiliate (until KMAX-TV launched its own 11 p.m. broadcast in 2013); the 11 p.m. newscast was discontinued on January 14, 2013. The following year on April 6, 2009, the 10 p.m. newscast was reduced from one hour to 33 minutes, with the second half-hour being replaced by reruns of Seinfeld; it was later reduced to a half-hour by 2011 (the length of the 11 p.m. newscast and the reduction of the 10 p.m. program resulted in an odd-numbered amount of news programming hours, making XETV the largest news-producing minor network station serving the United States whose evening newscast did not run for 30, 35 or 60 minutes, as well as having the only half-hour San Diego-targeted television newscast at 10 p.m., due to KUSI and KSWB having hour-long newscasts).

On March 9, 2009, XETV shut down its sports department; with the move, then-vice president and general manager Richard Doutre Jones (who left the station in June 2010 and was replaced by veteran sales manager Chuck Dunning) announced the firings of sports anchors C.S. Keys (who returned to XETV as a weather and traffic anchor from October 2011 to 2013) and Andrea Nakano and sports producer Mike Lamar. On April 23, 2011, XETV became the sixth television station in the San Diego market to begin broadcasting its local newscasts in high definition. Two days later on January 16, XETV expanded the weeknight editions of the 10 p.m. newscast back to one hour on weeknights; the weekend editions would not follow suit until January 17, 2015. The station would not program news outside its established morning and 10 p.m. slots again until January 12, 2015, when it premiered an hour-long late afternoon newscast at 4 p.m., which competed against existing newscasts aired at that hour on NBC owned-and-operated station KNSD and Fox affiliate KSWB-TV.

As a consequence of the closure of Bay City Television's operations following the loss of XETV's CW affiliation, the station announced that it would shut down its news operation on March 31, 2017. Rather than discontinue its weekday newscasts on the date of the news department's cessation and its weekend newscasts on the Sunday prior, XETV opted to phase out some of its news programmings in advance; the station discontinued its 4 p.m. newscast after the edition of February 24, 2017; this was followed by the cancellation of the weekend editions of CW 6 News in the Morning and the 10 p.m. newscast after March 12 broadcasts of both programs.

The weekday editions of CW 6 News in the Morning and the 10 p.m. newscast (as well as the hour-long weekday morning lifestyle program, San Diego Living, which debuted on the station in 2008) continued to air in the interim, until XETV's news operation officially folded following the edition of March 31, 2017, of the prime time newscast. All-time periods formerly occupied by local newscasts were replaced with other programs that would air until the closure of Bay City Television: the weekday morning and 4 p.m. and nightly 10 p.m. newscasts were replaced by syndicated programs, while the weekend morning newscast was replaced by The CW's One Magnificent Morning block (which was relegated two hours earlier to its network-recommended time slot following the cancellation of the newscast) on Saturdays and infomercials on Sundays.

=== Notable former on-air staff ===
- Brian Christie – anchor
- Ron Fortner – Channel 6 News Up to Date anchor
- John Mattes – investigative reporter

== Technical information ==
=== Subchannels ===
Subchannels of XETV-TDT
Subchannel	Res.	Short name	Programming
6.1	1080i	XETV-HD	Canal 5
16.1	1080i	XHGC-HD	Nu9ve

In October 2019, XETV was authorized to add a second subchannel with programming from Televisa's Nu9ve network, displacing affiliated XHBJ-TDT (channel 45). Nu9ve moved to XETV on November 1, 2019, occupying virtual channel 16—the lowest number available in Tijuana.

=== Conversion history ===
In 2000, XETV began transmitting a digital signal on UHF channel 23, becoming the first San Diego area station to begin digital television transmissions. It was also the first television station in Mexico to operate a digital signal; no other Mexican television station had begun digital operations at that time, and a digital television standard was not formally selected until 2004. It maps on digital tuners in both countries as virtual channel 6.1. In January 2006, the Secretariat of Communications and Transportation, which at the time still regulated broadcasting in Mexico, gave formal authorization for XETV's digital signal, with the full callsign XETV-TDT (a suffix standing for Televisión digital terrestre, or Digital terrestrial television) and an effective radiated power of 402.8 kilowatts.

As the original American digital television transition date of February 17, 2009, approached, XETV had expressed intentions to follow other San Diego-area stations in ceasing transmission of its analog signal. While the U.S. switchover deadline of February 17 was later pushed back to June 12, 2009, and only applied to American-licensed stations in any case, plans were announced to voluntarily make the station's English-language programming digital-only. The analog signal would be repurposed to retransmit the Mexican Galavisión network (not to be confused with the American cable channel of the same name). Claims on XETV's website that the station was indeed going to transmit a digitally-exclusive signal were rescinded on February 17, 2009, as the station decided to delay cutting off its analog signal until after it secured approval from the Mexican government. XETV management later stated that it had decided to maintain its analog signal to benefit Mexican viewers. XETV's analog signal was eventually repurposed on March 2, 2012, when the station began multicasting on its digital signal with the addition of Televisa's youth-oriented Canal 5 network on subchannel 6.2 and on its analog feed, while digital channel 6.1 retained the newscasts, CW network and syndicated programs in English. On the same date, XHBJ-TV channel 45 dropped Canal 5 for Galavisión. Canal 5 replaced XETV's English-language programming on its analog signal, in order to serve Spanish-speaking viewers in Tijuana that did not have television sets with built-in digital tuners or digital converter boxes prior to the Tijuana market's 2013 transition to digital television. The affiliation switch coincided with the commencement of digital multicasting on Televisa's Tijuana stations. Canal 5 moved to its primary channel on May 31, 2017, at which point, the 6.2 subchannel was decommissioned.

Cofetel, the Federal Telecommunications Commission, chose Tijuana as the first city to switch over to digital as a pilot program for the rest of Mexico. Unlike with the U.S. digital switchover, which took place nationwide, Mexico switched to digital television in stages by geographic area, completing the process on December 31, 2015. The original Tijuana switchover date of April 16, 2013, was delayed by Cofetel because the local population had not yet attained the required 90% readiness for free over-the-air digital service to trigger the transition. On May 28, 2013, XETV and all other Tijuana television stations ceased transmitting their analog signals, only to turn them back on a few days later after complaints from residents and political leaders that more viewers were left without over-the-air television service than Cofetel reported, including many poor residents outside of Tijuana proper that were not included in Cofetel's outreach program to allow residents to receive free digital-to-analog converter boxes. In addition, there were concerns that viewers would be left uninformed during the Baja California gubernatorial election campaign. The temporary reprieve was extended to July 18, 2013—after the election—when all analog television signals were shut down permanently.

XETV retained virtual channel 6 after a major reshuffle of Mexican virtual channels in October 2016, which ordered all existing Mexican national networks to realign their virtual channels based on the flagship channel numbers in Mexico City. In the immediate aftermath of the realignment, XETV was the only station using a channel 6 assignment throughout Mexico; the IFT had reserved channel 6 for a potential fourth national network (the number has since been assigned to Multimedios Televisión). Virtual channel 5 is not available to XETV because of signal overlap between XETV and KTLA (broadcasting on virtual channel 5), primarily around Oceanside, California. For the same reason, the Nu9ve subchannel cannot use channel 9, due to signal overlap with KCAL-TV over much of the same area. Most Tijuana stations face similar signal overlap issues in this area to Los Angeles stations that preclude them from using the virtual channels that correspond to their networks.

=== Repeaters ===
XETV operates two repeaters, on Cerro La Nopalera in Tecate and Colonia Playas de Tijuana. Both repeaters broadcast on channel 23 in areas where the main channel 23 signal from Mount San Antonio provides insufficient or no over-the-air coverage and are co-located with identical transmitters for XHUAA and XEWT.

== Radio ==
Prior to the termination of the station's analog broadcasts, XETV's audio signal could be heard at 87.75 MHz on the FM band in San Diego, Tijuana, and surrounding areas, though at a slightly lower volume than other FM radio stations. Unlike the digital ATSC standard, analog NTSC carried its sound on an FM subcarrier, and TV channel 6 (82–88 MHz) is adjacent to the standard broadcast FM band.

When XETV-TV shut down its analog signal on May 28, 2013, it shut down the station's 87.75 MHz audio subcarrier. An analog FM broadcast receiver cannot tune and decode digital television on any frequency.
