= XHILA-TDT =

Independent TV station in Mexicali, Baja California

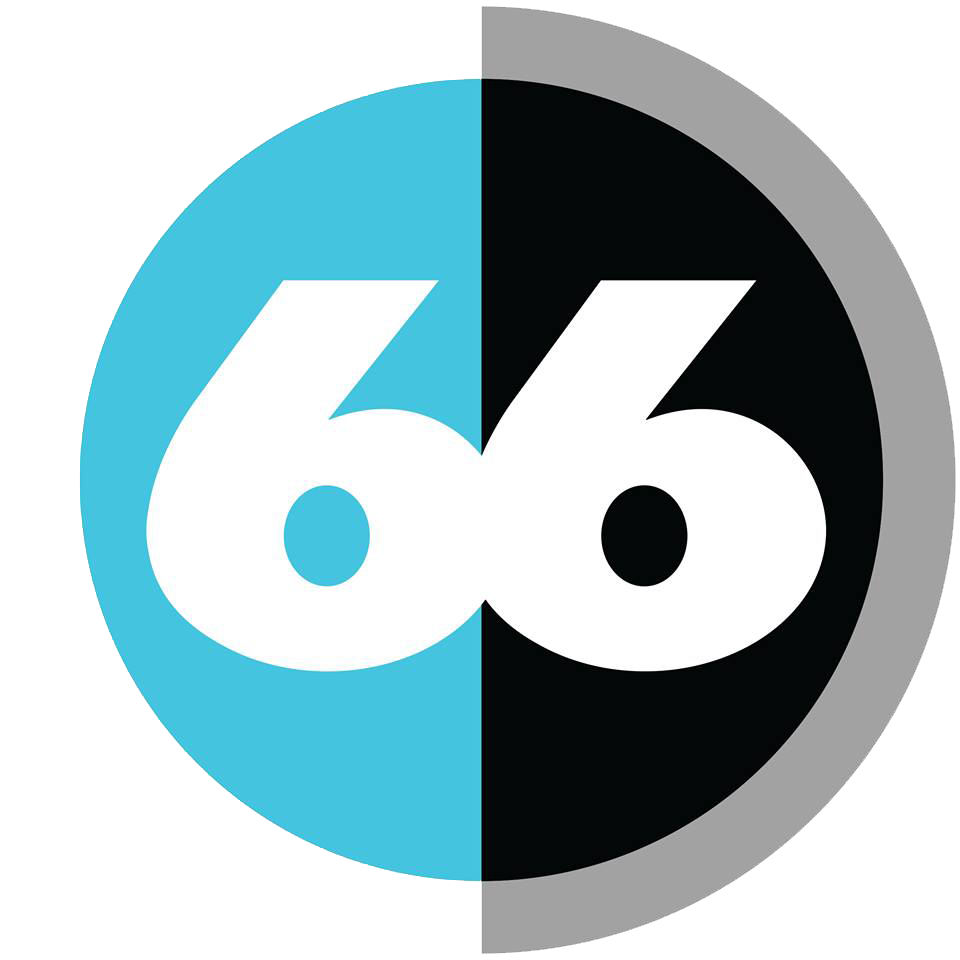
- Mexicali, Baja California San Luis Río Colorado, Sonora; Mexico
- City: Mexicali, Baja California
- Channels: Digital: 20 (UHF); Virtual: 66
- Branding: Canal 66; El Canal de las Noticias (The News Channel)

Programming
- Affiliations: 66.1: Canal 66 for others, see § Subchannels

Ownership
- Owner: Grupo Intermedia; (Arnoldo Cabada de la O)

History
- Founded: 1997
- First air date: October 1998
- Former call signs: XHILA-TV (1998–2013)
- Former channel numbers: Analog: 66 (UHF, 1998–2013); Digital: 46 (UHF, until 2018)
- Former affiliations: CNI (to 2005); cadenatres (until 2015)

Technical information
- Licensing authority: CRT
- ERP: 107.49 kW
- Transmitter coordinates: 32°31′34″N 115°35′49″W
- Translator(s): K07ZF/K29LS-D (Calexico, California); K33MD-D (Yuma, Arizona) (owned by Broadcast Group, Ltd.)

Links
- Website: www.canal66.tv

XHILA-TDT (channel 66) is a Spanish-language independent television station in Mexicali, Baja California, Mexico, serving the Mexicali Valley and the southern Imperial Valley, including El Centro, California, and the Colorado River cities of San Luis Río Colorado, Sonora, and Yuma, Arizona. The station is also carried on the cable television systems of each of the four principal communities it serves.

Taking to air in October 1998, the station is owned by Intermedia de Mexicali, a subsidiary of the Ciudad Juárez–based Grupo Intermedia and is licensed to its president, Arnoldo Cabada de la O.

== History ==
XHILA's prior logo, used through 2008.

The station began with experimental broadcasts in 1997, then began broadcasting commercially in October 1998. It has been owned since its inception by Intermedia de Mexicali, airing independent programming during the day, and (originally) news from CNI at night.

From 2008 to 2015, XHILA was affiliated with Mexico's newest broadcast network, cadenatres.

=== Dismissal of Gustavo Macalpin ===
On October 7, 2024, Gustavo Macalpin, host of the political satire program Ciudadano 2.0, was fired on air by the channel's director, Luis Arnoldo Cabada Alvídrez. Initially, Macalpin thought Cabada would participate in a sketch. However, Cabada started by thanking Macalpin for his six years in charge of the program, only to later inform him that his time at the company was ending. Macalpin accepted the dismissal and continued working on his final broadcast. Cabada's actions faced negative criticism, and Macalpin described them as intimidating and humiliating. Macalpin had made criticisms of multiple Morena politicians, the ruling party of Mexico, including Marina del Pilar Ávila Olmeda, the governor of Baja California, her husband, Carlos Alberto Torres Torres, as well as Andrés Manuel López Obrador, the president of Mexico from 2018 to 2024, his children, and Claudia Sheinbaum, the incoming president. Ávila expressed her surprise at the news and wished him success in future projects. Sheinbaum commented that the manner of his dismissal was inappropriate if it was due to censorship.

== Programming ==
XHILA-TDT targets both sides of the U.S.–Mexican border. XHILA-TDT provides local information, news shows and variety programs for viewers along with a schedule of movies, comedies and programs of interest.

In 2015, Intermedia signed a contract with the Sistema Público de Radiodifusión del Estado Mexicano to carry its Una Voz con Todos network on its stations in Mexicali and Ciudad Juárez. This marks the first time that Mexicali has ever had national public television service.

== Technical information ==
=== Subchannels ===
The station's signal is multiplexed:

Subchannels of XHILA-TDT
Channel	Res.	Short name	Programming
66.1	1080i	XHILA	Main XHILA-TDT programming
66.2	480i	XHILA	Canal Catorce (4:3)
66.3	480i	XHILA	2-hour delay of 66.1
66.4	480i	XHILA	Milenio Televisión (4:3)

=== Analog shutdown ===
Under Mexican law, XHILA would have been required to turn off its analog signal on November 26, 2013 (a date that has since been postponed), but XHILA opted to switch early, seeking and winning approval from Cofetel to shut down early.

On March 6, 2013, at 11:30 p.m., XHILA turned off its analog signal. It was the first television station in Mexicali to do so and the second in Mexico, after XHUNAM-TDT went digital-only in 2005.

In March 2018, in order to facilitate the repacking of TV services out of the 600 MHz band (channels 38–51), XHILA was assigned channel 20 for continued digital operations, however, the station did not perform the repack until November 27, making it the last station in Mexicali to do so after XHBC-TDT, XHMEX-TDT and XHMEE-TDT repacked in July 2017.

=== U.S. translators ===
Broadcast Group, Ltd., an American company which is controlled by the Cabada family, owns two translators in the United States that relay XHILA.

In Yuma, the analog translator was low-powered K28FM. At various times in its history, it was affiliated with musical networks such as Más Música and MTV Tr3s, and at others it rebroadcast XHILA. K28FM, in effect, was the first American affiliate of cadenatres as it relayed XHILA when it took on the affiliation in 2008. In the late 2000s, K28FM went silent; in 2015, K33MD-D, a digital translator also owned by Broadcast Group, was put into service. The license for K28FM was cancelled by the Federal Communications Commission on July 19, 2021.

In Calexico, K07ZF (channel 7) was the analog translator. Given that the digital transition of XHILA's Mexicali transmitter led to a loss of viewership, channel 7 was promoted as XHILA's analog channel. In 2015, K42KZ-D, also owned by Broadcast Group, was signed on.

Both the Yuma and Calexico transmitters relay XHILA, including all of its subchannels.

K42KZ-D was assigned channel 29 in order to clear the 600 MHz band, and became K29LS-D effective November 3, 2021.
