= XEWT-TDT =

Television station in Tijuana

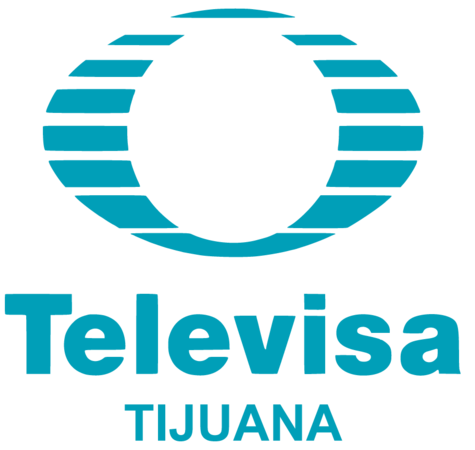

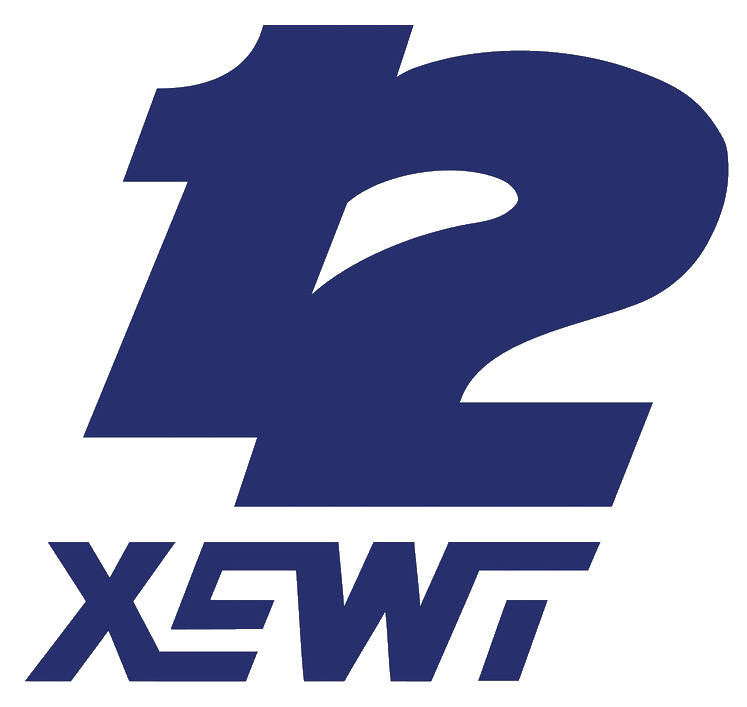
- Tijuana, Baja California; San Diego, California; Mexico–United States
- City: Tijuana, Baja California
- Channels: Digital: 32 (UHF); Virtual: 12
- Branding: Televisa Tijuana

Programming
- Affiliations: 12.1: Televisa Regional

Ownership
- Owner: Grupo Televisa; (Televisora de Occidente, S.A. de C.V.)
- Sister stations: XETV-TDT, XHUAA-TDT

History
- First air date: July 18, 1960
- Former call signs: XEWT-TV (1960–2013)
- Former channel numbers: Analog: 12 (VHF, 1960–2013)
- Former affiliations: SIN/Univision (1960s–1990)
- Call sign meaning: XEW Tijuana

Technical information
- Licensing authority: CRT
- ERP: 200 kW
- HAAT: 229.3 m (752 ft)
- Transmitter coordinates: 32°30′5.73″N 117°2′26.13″W

XEWT-TDT (channel 12), informally called Tu Canal ("Your Channel"), is a television station in Tijuana, Baja California, Mexico, owned by Grupo Televisa. XEWT's over-the-air signal also covers the San Diego–Tijuana region across the Mexico–United States border (and holds cable coverage in San Diego on Cox systems). XEWT's transmitter is located on Mount San Antonio in Tijuana, with a San Diego bureau on Third Avenue in Chula Vista.

Though its callsign seems to indicate that it is a repeater of XEW-TDT in Mexico City, XEWT airs a selection of programming from all four Televisa networks. It also airs local news and programming aimed towards Hispanics on both sides of the border.

== History ==
XEWT was the first Spanish-language station for San Diego and Tijuana. It signed on July 18, 1960, and received its concession on August 6 of that year, with Telesistema Mexicano owning it through concessionaire Televisora de Calimex, S.A. It was Tijuana's second TV station, with English-language sister station XETV signing on in 1953. From the 1970s through the end of 1990, XEWT was originally an affiliate of the Spanish International Network (later Univision).

== Programming ==
As the local Televisa station in Tijuana, XEWT produces local programs during the day and overnight. During the afternoons and evenings (from 6:30 to 10:30 p.m.), the station simulcasts Televisa's national network Las Estrellas, which is dedicated to telenovelas, game shows, comedies, and sports. Las Estrellas can also be seen on XEWT's sister station XHUAA-TDT, which is the network's repeater station in Tijuana.

There are several interesting schedule overlaps between XEWT and San Diego's Univision affiliate, KBNT-CD (channel 17). Although both are competitors in the San Diego/Tijuana market, they both carry some of the same programming. Univision carries some Televisa programming in its lineup and this is thus reflected in KBNT's lineup.

=== Newscasts ===
XEWT established a reorganized news department called Las Noticias (formerly Notivisa until 2019) on February 29, 1988. It originally established a Tijuana-centric 5 p.m. newscast and a 10:30 p.m. newscast focusing on all of Baja California. Among the personalities who have anchored and reported for Notivisa is veteran anchor Fernando del Monte, who worked for the station from 1989 to 2007 and again since 2015, running as the PRI candidate for Municipal President of Tijuana in between stints.

Like its sister stations in Baja California, XEWT produces 17 1/2 hours of locally produced newscast each week, including a weeknight regional newscast, as seen on XEWT, XHBC in Mexicali, and XHS in Ensenada, which share some of XEWT's resources and news reports. XEWT previously produced a 6pm newscast until 2016.

As of January 28, 2019, XEWT revamped its hours of local news. The station now airs a 90-minute morning newscast at 6:30 a.m. (followed by Que Buen Dia), a full-hour newscast at 2 p.m., a new 90-minute evening newscast at 5 p.m., and a late night newscast at 10:30 p.m. which focuses on all of Baja California, as well as San Diego and the Imperial Valley.

== Technical information ==
=== Subchannel ===
Subchannel of XEWT-TDT
Subchannel	Res.	Short name	Programming
12.1	1080i	XEWT	Televisa Regional

Televisa was approved to add FOROtv to six stations, primarily regional outlets, in northern Mexico in January 2018. Nationally, FOROtv moved to subchannels of Las Estrellas transmitters, including XHUAA-TDT, in spring 2019.

=== Analog-to-digital conversion ===
XEWT discontinued its analog signal on May 28, 2013. Tijuana was the first city in Mexico where the analog-to digital conversion took place. Immediately after the closure, worries about effects on the Baja California elections prompted the restoration of analog service until July 18, when XEWT and other Tijuana TV stations discontinued their analog signals again, this time for good. At this time, the callsign changed to XEWT-TDT.

=== Repeaters ===
XEWT operates repeaters in Tecate (which was not converted until 2015) and Col. Playas de Tijuana.
