= Television in Latin America =

Television in Latin America currently includes more than 1,500 television stations and more than 60 million TV sets throughout the 20 countries that constitute Latin America. Due to economic and political problems television networks in some countries of this region have developed less than the North American and European networks, for instance. In other countries like Colombia or Chile, television broadcasting has historically been public-broadcast dominated until the 1990s. The largest commercial television groups are Mexico-based Televisa, Brazil-based Globo and Canada-based Canwest Latin American Group. Due to the shared language of Spanish by two thirds of Latin Americans a lot of programmes and broadcasters operate throughout the region, offering both United States television (often dubbed into Spanish) and Spanish-language television.

== Argentina ==
- El Trece
- Telefe
- El Nueve
- Canal Siete
- América TV
- Net TV
- Alpha TV
- TyC Sports

== Bolivia ==
- Activa TV
- ATB
- Bolivia TV
- Bolivisión
- Cadena A
- F10
- Red Uno
- RTP
- Unitel

== Brazil ==
- Globo (since 1965)
- RecordTV (since 1953)
- SBT (since 1981)
- Bandeirantes (since 1967)
- RedeTV! (since 1999)
- Cultura (since 1969)
- TV Brasil (since 2007)
- Gazeta (since 1970)

== Chile ==
- TV+ (since 1957), channel 5
- Canal 13 (since 1959), channel 13
- Chilevisión (since 1960, under different names), channel 11
- TVN (since 1969), channel 7
- Mega (since 1990), channel 9
- La Red (since 1991), channel 4
- Telecanal (since 2005), channel 2

== Colombia ==
- Caracol TV
- Canal RCN
- Canal 1
- Señal Colombia

== Costa Rica ==
- Canal 38 Estereo
- Conexion TV
- Repretel 4
- Repretel 6
- Repretel 9 (discontinued)
- Repretel 11
- Sinart
- Teletica
- UCR TV

== Cuba ==
- Cubavisión
- Tele Rebelde
- Canal Educativo
- Canal Educativo 2
- Multivisión

== Dominican Republic ==
- TeleAntillas - Channel 2
- Corporación Estatal de Radio y Television CERTV - Channel 4 Public TV Station
- Telemicro
- Antena Latina - Channel 7
- Color Visión
- Telesistema Dominicano - Channel 11
- Telecentro - Channel 13
- Sport Vision - Channel 35
- Cana TV - Popular local morning shows, news coverage, cooking shows and family entertainment
- Vegateve
- CDN 37
- SuperCanal

== Ecuador ==
- Ecuavisa
- RTS
- La Tele
- TVC
- Teleamazonas
- Oromar Televisión
- TC Televisión
- Gamavisión
- Ecuador TV

== El Salvador ==
- Ágape TV Canal 8
- Canal 10
- Canal 12
- Canal 33
- Megavisión (Channels 15, 19 and 21)
- Telecorporacion Salvadoreña (Channels 2, 4, 6 and TCS+)

== Guatemala ==
VHF

- Canal 3 (Albavision)
- Canal 5 TV Maya
- Canal 7 Televisiete (Albavision)
- Canal 9 TV Congreso (off air)
- Canal 11 Tele-Once (Albavision)
- Canal 13 Trecevisión (Albavision)

UHF

- Canal 19 Albanoticias -mirrored- (Albavision)
- Canal 21 Enlace
- Canal 23 Albanoticias (Albavision)
- Canal 25 Guatevision
- Canal 27 El canal de la Esperanza
- Canal 31 TV Azteca Guatemala
- Canal 33 TV USAC
- Canal 35 TV Azteca Guatemala
- Canal 37 Telecentro -mirrored- (Albavision)
- Canal 41 Telecentro (Albavision)
- Canal 61 Enlace Juvenil
- Canal 63 Televisión Arquidiocesana
- Canal 65 Family TV

Satellite

- 18-50 TV
- Canal Antigua
- Vea Canal
- Guatevision

Guatemala doesn't have a digital terrestrial standard yet, but it seems that ISDB-T will be the standard. Albavision broadcast in the ATSC format for about four years on channel 19 HDTV, but is now back to analog transmission on that same frequency.

== Honduras ==
- Globo Tv Honduras
- Canal 3 Quimistan
- Televicentro
- Canal 6 (Honduras)
- Teleceiba 7
- Sulavision
- TEN (Television Educacional de Honduras)
- Villavision
- Canal 11
- Yojoa Tv
- Telemas Canal 13

== Mexico ==
- Televisa (Las Estrellas, Canal 5)
- TV Azteca (Azteca Uno, Azteca 7)
- Imagen Televisión
- Canal Once Mexico
- Telehit
- Gala TV
- N+ Foro
- Cadenatres

== Nicaragua ==
- Canal 2
- Canal 4
- Canal 6
- TN8
- Canal 9
- Canal 10
- Canal 11
- Nicavisión
- Canal 6 Nicaragüense
- Viva Nicaragua
- Canal 15 Nicaragüense

== Panama ==
- RPC
- TVN
- Telemetro
- FETV
- Oye TV
- TVMax
- Sertv
- Nex

== Paraguay ==
- Trece
- LaTele
- Paravisión
- SNT
- Telefuturo
- Unicanal
- Paraguay TV

== Peru ==
=== National networks ===
Frequency numbers for Lima in analog TV. (most are also available on DTT)

- Channel 2 Latina
- Channel 4 América TV
- Channel 5 Panamericana TV
- Channel 7 TV Perú
- Channel 9 ATV
- Channel 11 Viva TV
- Channel 13 Global TV

=== Pay TV ===
National channels from Telefónica's Cable Mágico, the country's most popular operator.

- Plus Life
- Canal N
- Movistar Deportes

== Puerto Rico ==
Puerto Rico follows USA TV Code system

- Telemundo Puerto Rico (WKAQ)
- Sistema TV (WMTJ)
- WAPA TV (WAPA)
- Puerto Rico TV (WIPR) government
- Univisión PR (WSTE)
- TeleOnce (WLII)
- Canal de Vídeos (WTCV)
- TeleOro (WORO) religious-catholic church
- New conscience network (WUJA (religious)
- La cadena del milagro WCCV RELIGIOUS
- América Tevé (WJPX)
- Único TV pr WECN
- Bayamon Christian network WDWL RELIGIOUS
- AMÉRICA TE VE PR (WIRS)
- Canal iglesia de dios Pentecostal WIDP RELIGIOUS
- VMAX (WRFB)
- Accu weather WMEI
- WAPA 2 (sports)
- Punto dos

== Uruguay ==
- Canal 4 (Montevideo)
- Canal 5
- Canal 10 (Montevideo)
- Teledoce
- La Red
- TV Ciudad

== Venezuela ==
=== private television ===
- Venevisión
- Televen
- Globovisión
- Meridiano TV
- Canal I

=== State television ===
- VTV
- ViVe
- Telesur
- TVES
- Colombeia

== See also ==
- Latin American television awards
