= Television in Ecuador =

Television in Ecuador is most important among the country's mass media. Television programming is dominated by telenovelas, series, and news programming. Private and government-run channels coexist at the national, regional, and local levels. Cable channels are also beginning to appear, most of which are exclusive to the companies that operate them. Finally, there are also internet television channels, some of which have specific themes like LGBT programming.

There are six private channels (Ecuavisa, Teleamazonas, RTS, Telerama, RTU, Radio y Televisión Unidas, Latele and Oromar Televisión) and four government-run channels (TC Televisión, Gama TV, Canal Uno and Ecuador TV) available throughout the country. In 2011, 83% of channels were privately owned, 17% were publicly owned, and 0% were community owned.

== History ==
Television in Ecuador started by initiative of José Rosenbaum, a German Jew who fled to Ecuador to escape persecution by Nazi Germany. Together with his wife, Linda Zambrano, from Manabí, they travelled to a fair in Hanover to buy equipment for the first television station. The station was initially set to be in Quito, but due to lack of public awareness, the station moved to Guayaquil. The first test broadcasts were conducted on September 29, 1959 in the facilities of Radio Cenit.

In the same year, regular television broadcasts of HCJB-TV, owned by the HCJB radio ministry, began in Quito. Its launch was marked by a lack of television regulations, which were officially imposed on December 5, 1959. Rosenbaum's station, Primera Televisora Ecuatoriana, started broadcasting on December 12, 1960. Owned by Organizaciones Norlop, it was later renamed Telecuador, during which it started (in 1962) the first fully-commercial television station in Quito (channel 6) in 1962.

In the late 1960s, channel 2 in Guayaquil (part of the current Ecuavisa network), founding and receiving its equipment in 1966 and starting broadcasts on March 1, 1967. The network gained a second station in Quito (channel 8) in 1970. In 1969, CETV (now TC Televisión) started broadcasting, being owned by La Filantrópica (later Filanbanco). HCJB sold its television station to Antonio Granda Centeno, who set up Teleamazonas using its frequency in Quito (channel 4). After receiving its color equipment order in February 1973, it started test broadcasts on November 5, 1973, becoming regular on February 22, 1974. The launch of Teleamazonas, whose national transmitting network was received in border areas of Peru at launch, put Ecuador in fourth place in Latin America to introduce color television, after Brazil, the Dominican Republic and Mexico. Before the first tests conducted by Teleamazonas, Ecuavisa was already broadcasting its first programs in color in June 1973, limited to imports.

In 1977, Telenacional began broadcasting. The controversial businessman Remigio Ángel González bought his first outlet in Ecuador on August 15, 1983, Telecuatro Guayaquil, followed in 1991 by the acquisition of channel 5 in Quito (Ortel, founded 1984, renamed Maxivisión).

== Most viewed channels ==
Position	Channel	Share of total viewing (%)
1	Ecuavisa	12.0
2	Teleamazonas	11.4
3	TC Televisión	8.3
4	Gamavisión	7.8
5	RTS	5.9
6	Canal Uno (defunct in 2021)	3.5
7	Oromar TV	2.1
8	TVC	1.9
9	Ecuador TV	1.4
10	La Tele	1.0

== Channels ==
- Quito TV
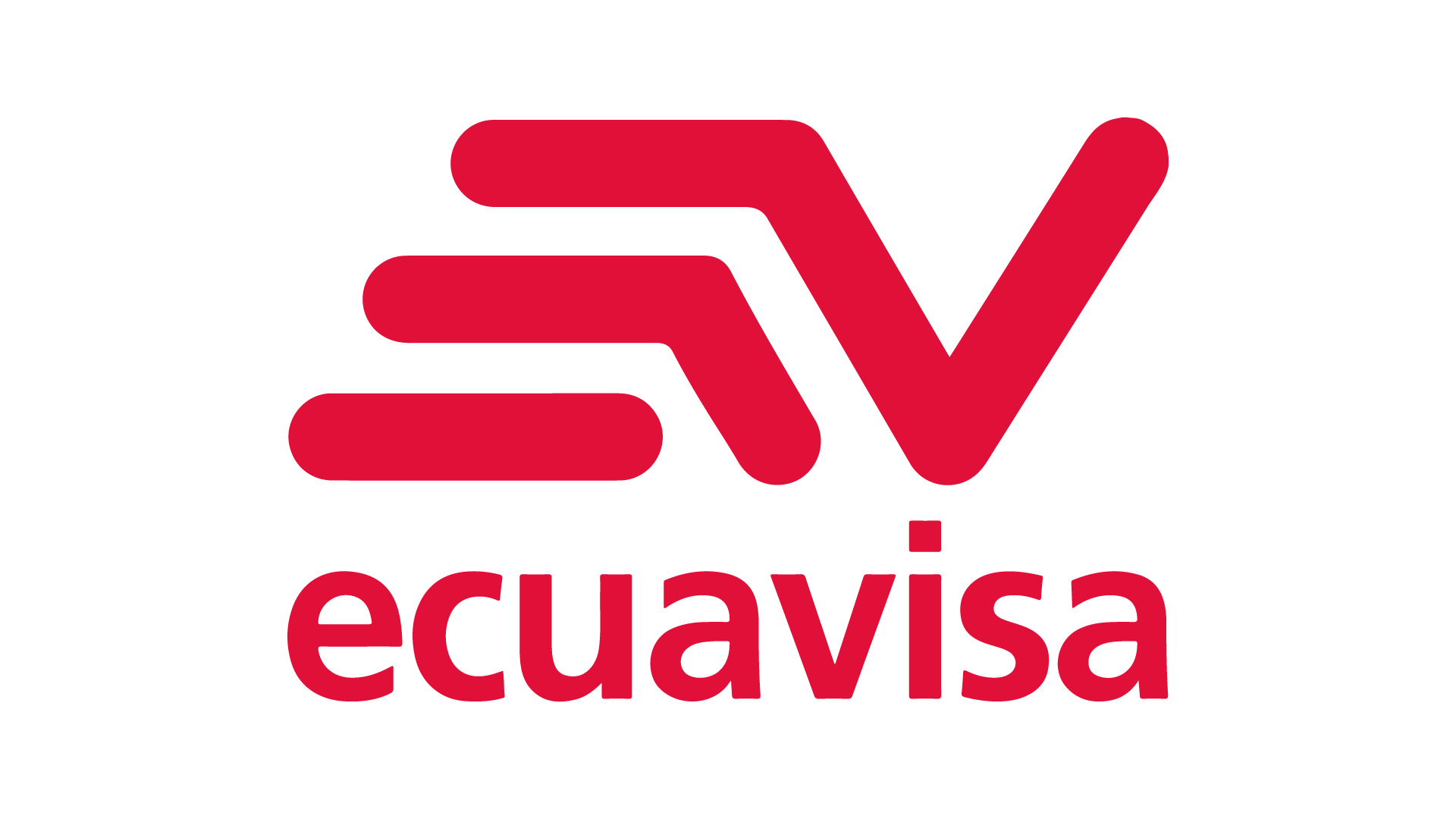
Ecuavisa

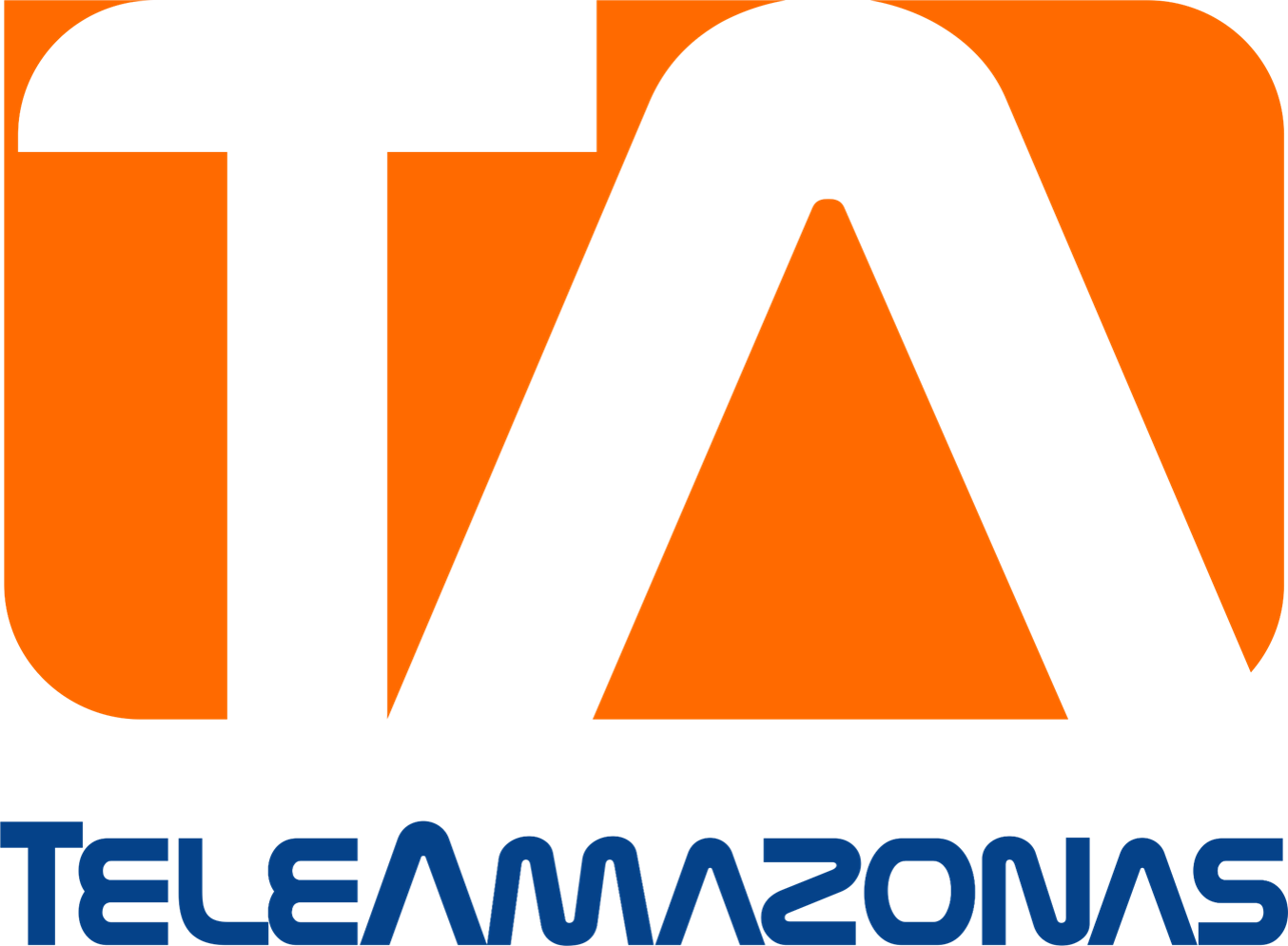
Teleamazonas

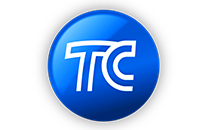
TC Televisión

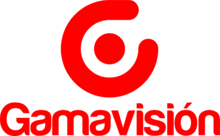
Gamavisión

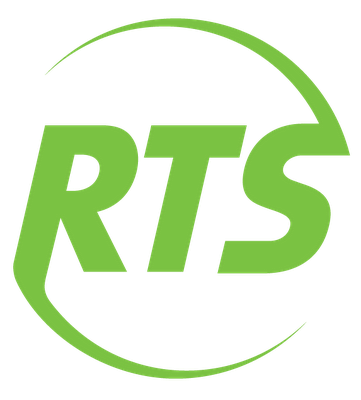
RTS

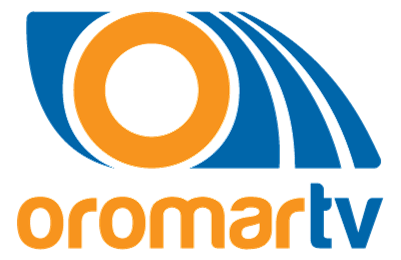
Oromar Televisión

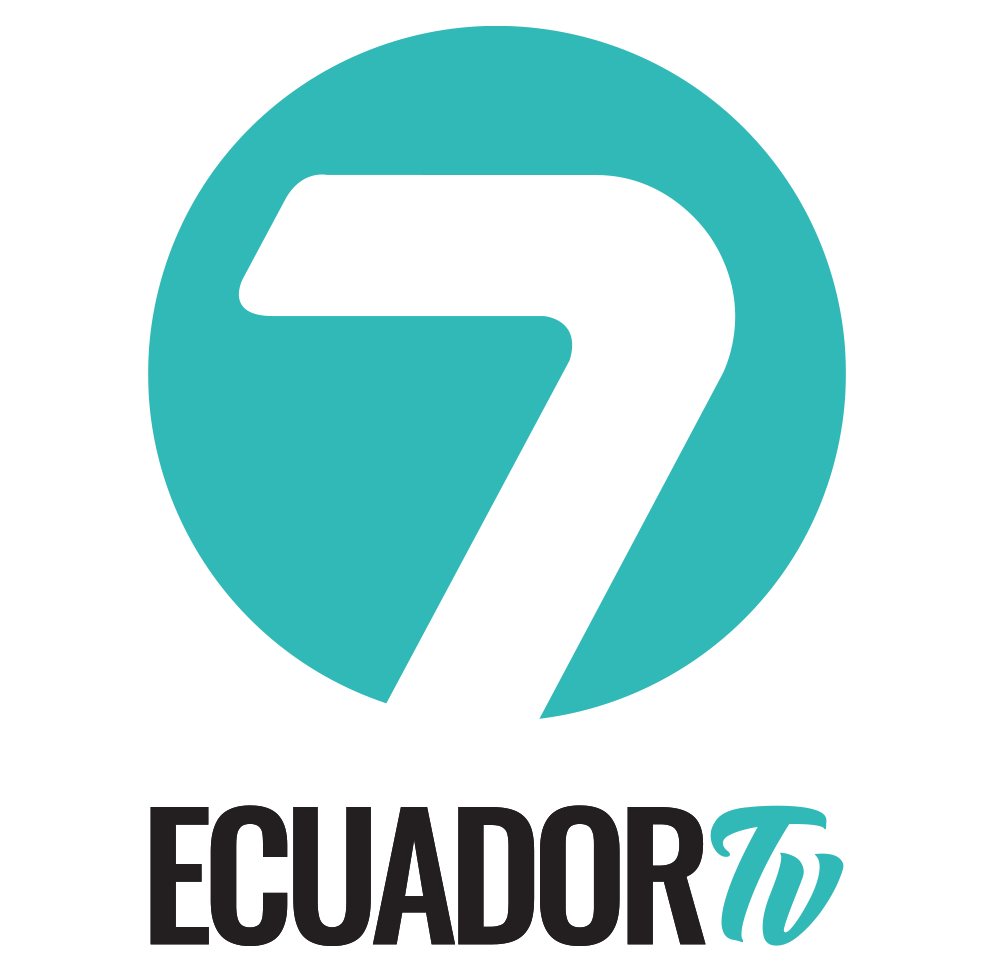
Ecuador TV

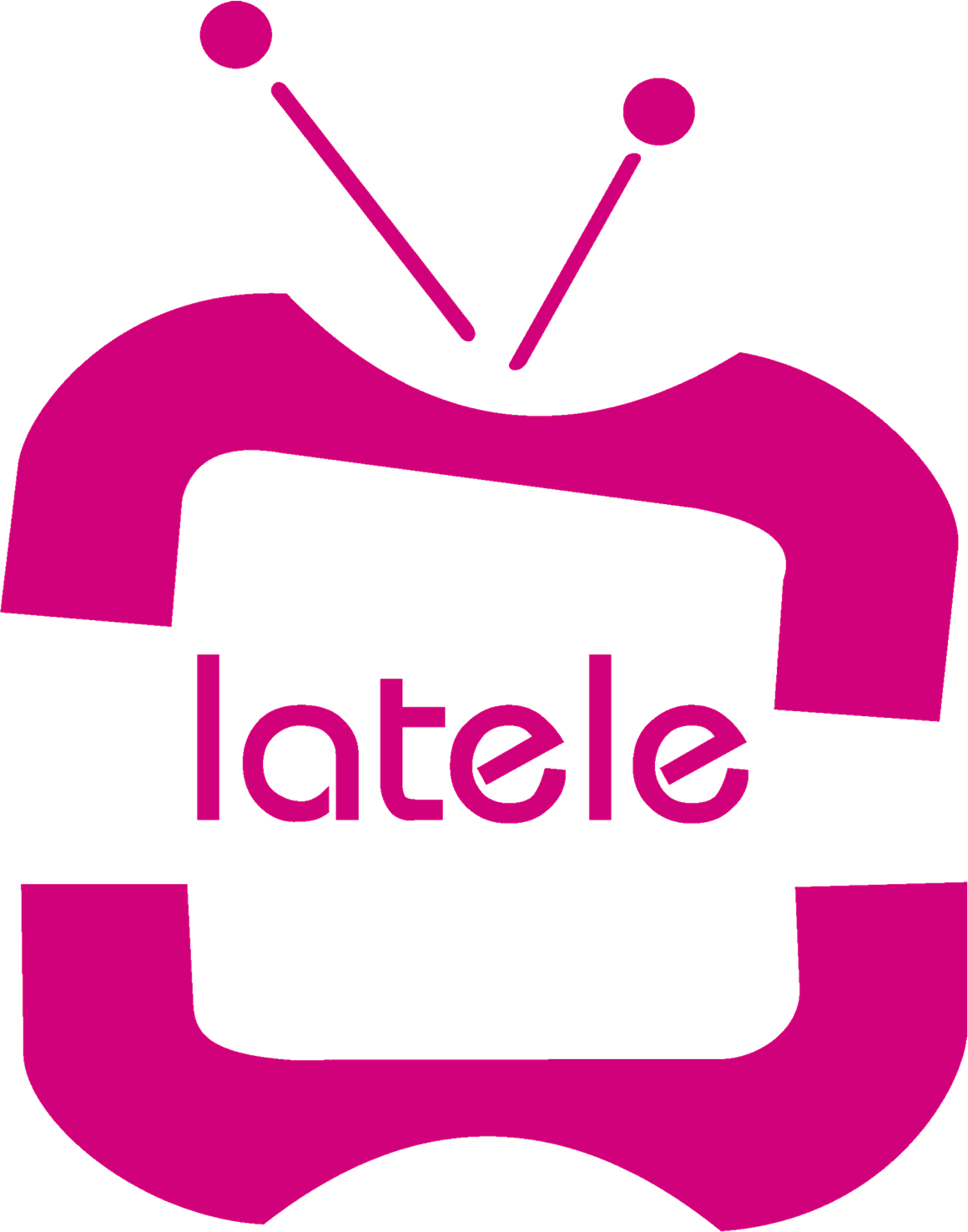
La Tele

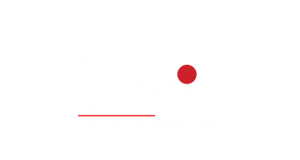
RTU

== International channels ==
- Ecuavisa Internacional
- Ecuador TV Internacional
- TC Internacional
- ECDF Internacional
