= Albavisión =

Media company

Albavisión LLC
- Logo used since 2019
- Type: Private
- Industry: Media
- Founded: March 14, 1987; 39 years ago
- Founder: Remigio Ángel González
- Headquarters: Miami, Florida, United States
- Owner: RAG, Inc.
- Subsidiaries: Chapin TV (Guatemala); Repretel (Costa Rica); Red Salvadoreña de Medios (El Salvador); Grupo Ratensa (Nicaragua); Grupo ATV (Peru)
- Website: www.albavision.tv

Albavisión (formerly Prolasa and Televideo Services) is a multinational media company based in Miami and owned by controversial Mexican-turned-Guatemalan businessman Remigio Ángel González, operating primarily in Spanish-speaking countries in Latin America.

Part of the company's modus operandi involved the buying of failing television stations in the region, with González having control on a substantial amount of the channel's programming, mainly telenovelas and US feature films bought in block deals for several territories.

== History ==
Prolasa, S.A. was founded in 1975 and is currently one of Albavisión's figurehead companies, registered in Panama. The current conglomerate was adopted in May 2008, with the name being derived from his wife, Alba Elvira Lorenzana. This also coincided with its first major project in high definition, Copa Centroamericana de Fútbol, to which it acquired the broadcast rights for the region. In the last few years up to 2008, its founder Ángel González had been surrounded by top-level sales executives and international program distributors, strengthening the network, becoming one of the market's most-solicited buyers. The company also started producing telenovelas, in association with Peruvian company Chroma, in a ten-year contract which was set to expire in 2018, and planned the launch of Canal Latinoamericano de Noticias, using the resources of its stations, in the second half of 2008, which was set to broadcast from Bogotá. The stations are programmed by Ángel González himself.

In 2008, as Televideo Services, it signed a ten-country block deal with Power, a European indie producer and distributor, to carry titles from the Power and RHI catalogs on its channels.

In 2010, the network signed an output deal in block with HIT Entertainment, to provide its 600-hour catalog of preschool series to its stations.

The conglomerate selected Rohde & Schwarz as its partner for the manufacture of transmitters for its Guatemalan stations in August 2011.

In April 2018, Peruvian TV executive Eric Jurgensen joined the network.

The group selected Novelsat's FUSION platform in November 2021 to deliver live sports feeds for its network.

== Albavisión by country ==
=== Argentina ===
Remigio Ángel González bought 80% of Canal 9 in January 2007 for the sum of US$70 million, aiming to convert it into a production hub for Latin America and assuming its defaulted debt of US$40 million. Daniel Hadad, former full owner, had his share reduced to 20%. One of the company's goals was to produce telenovelas in Argentina due to its low costs post-devaluation in 2002. Albavisión's control of the channel maliciously nicknamed it as el canal de las latas (the channel of the "cans") due to its heavy amount of foreign programming, known in Spanish jargon as "latas". With the advent of digital terrestrial television, it launched Video Éxito and Suri TV, the latter of which relaying programs from its channels in Peru, Chile, Bolivia and Paraguay.

The group also owned several radio stations: Radio AM 750, Radio Like, Radio Oktubre, Radio Club, Mucha Radio and FM Aspen, the last of which in association with Grupo Octubre. In November 2020, the group acquired Albavisión's Argentine assets.

=== Bolivia ===
In May 2007, González bought Bolivisión from Ernesto Asbún. That same month, he visited the stations in Santa Cruz and Cochabamba to review their operations. Following a "technical collapse" in Santa Cruz in July 2010, all programming was now produced from the station in La Paz, the seat of government.

=== Chile ===
González acquired 33.5% of La Red in 1999, achieving full control in 2003. In 2005, he founded Telecanal thanks to a complex organizational structure, which has been questioned by CNTV. The network faced a massive strike in 2022, cancelling its original programs.

To evade him from owning two channels at the same time due to strict CNTV regulations, the owner is Guillermo Cañedo White, who only borrowed González's name. On June 16, 2025, the channel started broadcasting RT en Español without prior warning, causing massive concern from locals. The contract Canal Dos, S.A. had with Unimedios was suspended on April 17, 2026, where Telecanal was placed under a one-week suspension from midnight on April 18.

=== Costa Rica ===
Repretel was founded in 1993 with the acquisition of Canal 9, followed in 1995 by the acquisition of Telecentro (channel 6) and Canal 11. In 2000, it acquired TV Cuatro from TV Azteca and decided to change its formula, in exchange for Repretel 9, which started relaying Repretel 4. A fourth channel operates as CDR Canal 2, which provides visual radio services of some of its stations.

Through Central de Radios, Repretel owns eleven radio stations, and is also the owner of Nova Cinemas, with a unit in Escazú featuring seven screens, one of them using IMAX.

=== Dominican Republic ===
In 2015, radio station Z101 announced that Albavisión had acquired Antena Latina (renamed Antena 7 in 2016) and UHF outlet Antena 21 from the bankrupt Baninter. Indotel refused to comment.

=== Ecuador ===
González began his involvement with Ecuadorian TV on August 15, 1983, acquiring most shares in Telecuatro Guayaquil through figurehead company Inversiones Fiduciarias, then, in 1991, Ortel in Quito, which was renamed Maxivisión. After being accused of violating Ecuadorian media laws regarding foreign control, he gained full ownership of the RTS network in the 2000s, due to the passing of the Trole II law. Since then he also acquired five radio stations at once in 2004 (the "quintuplets"): Galaxia Stereo, Joya Stereo, Alfa Stereo, Metro Stereo and Tropicálida Stereo, broadcasting in an area adjacent to RTS's main facilities in Guayaquil. Later, in 2016, Albavisión separated the Ortel licenses from RTS's and created a new Quito-based network, Televicentro, while granting new frequencies for RTS in Quito and Televicentro in Guayaquil without public contest.

Two other television channels are operated by the group: La Tele, founded in 1997 in Guayaquil as Costavisión and in 1998 in Quito as Andivisión, had connections to a station González already owned, Tropicálida Stereo. Using the Ortel license, he set up a second generalist network, Televicentro, which started broadcasting in 2016.

=== El Salvador ===
Albavisión started broadcasting on channel 11 (TUTV) in 2014, which countered SIGET's obligations to move UFG TV, a UHF channel, to said frequency. With the acquisition of Canal 12 and Sonora 104.5 in January 2016, Red Salvadoreña de Medios was created.

=== Guatemala ===
Alba Elvira Lorenzana acquired Televisiete in 1980; by 1988, it also controlled Canal 3, followed by channels 11 and 13 in the 1990s. The group also owned Comunicaciones FC, a football club, radio stations, AlbaCinema and three restaurants: Los Gauchos, Teppan Yaki and Puerto Barrios.

González was charged for corruption in 2016.

=== Honduras ===
Vica Televisión, by then renamed VTV, was acquired by Albavisión in 2010.

=== Mexico ===
Tele-Emisoras del Sureste (Telsusa) started with the concession of XHTVL-TV in Villahermosa, Tabasco. The Telsusa-owned stations were Televisa Regional affiliates, but the plans to create a national network (interest started as early as 2008) began to solidify following XHTVL's disaffiliation from Televisa. Branded as Canal 13, it broadcasts to several states of Mexico on channel 13.1.

=== Nicaragua ===
RATENSA (Radio y Televisión de Nicaragua, S.A.) claims to be "the most complete media network and the network with the widest reach in national television." It started in the early 90s when González assisted FSLN members in the establishment of Canal 4, followed in 1997 by Canal 10. Canal 4 was sold to INTRASA in 2006. In the early 2010s, RATENSA acquired channels 9 and 11 and later, the control of part of Canal 2 (Televicentro de Nicaragua), which became a condominium with Maurice Ortega, who became in charge of TVNoticias. Canal 2, however, is still an independent operation from the three core RATENSA channels.

=== Panama ===
Albavisión owns the local franchise of Radio Disney Latin America. The group announced in December 2013 that it would bring the Costa Rican cinema chain Nova Cinemas to the country.

=== Paraguay ===
González acquired SNT from local businessmen between 1998 and 1999.

The group is known locally as Albavisión Paraguay. It owns four television channels (SNT, C9N, Sur TV and Paravisión, as well as radio station RQP Paraguay. In 2022, twenty female journalists working for the local branch of Abavisión criticized accusations of sexual misconduct and labor abuse.

=== Peru ===
ATV was acquired from local owners between 2000 and 2001. Grupo ATV owns five channels: ATV, ATV+, Global Televisión and La Tele, all of which national networks in Lima, and ATV Sur, a regional station from Arequipa.

=== United States ===
Albavisión owns Telecentro USA, a channel aimed at the Central American diaspora in the United States, which launched on the DirecTV platform on October 23, 2008 with a launch cocktail in Washington DC.

=== Uruguay ===
Albavisión does not operate television channels, only radio stations.

== Multinational brands ==
- La Tele is used as the name of a channel in Peru and Ecuador.
- Combate is the name given to a competition game show that first aired on RTS in Ecuador. Subsequent versions were made on other Albavisión networks: in Peru on ATV, Costa Rica on Repretel 11, Guatemala on Canal 3 and Argentina on El Nueve. In 2015, executives of four versions (Peru, Guatemala, Costa Rica and Argentina) convened in Lima to discuss its potential; whereas the Argentine edition was already being broadcast in El Salvador and Paraguay live, and on tape delay in Bolivia and Nicaragua.
- Arpeggio was a classical music channel that originated in Argentina. In 2016, its reach expanded to several countries with Albavisión networks. The channel closed in September 2017, when its original frequency in Argentina was taken over by France 24's Spanish-language feed.
