= TUTV =

Salvadoran television channel

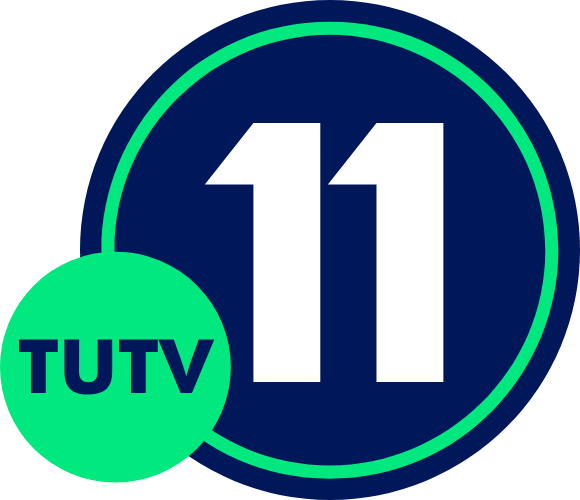
- Country: El Salvador
- Headquarters: Antiguo Cuscatlán, La Libertad

Programming
- Language: Spanish
- Picture format: 720p HDTV

Ownership
- Owner: Red Salvadoreña de Medios (Albavisión)
- Sister channels: Canal 12

History
- Launched: 10 April 2014; 12 years ago
- Founder: TVRED
- Former names: TV Red (2014-2016)

Links
- Website: www.canal11.com.sv

Availability

Terrestrial
- Analog VHF: Channel 11

TUTV Canal 11 is a Salvadoran over-the-air television channel, secondary outlet of Canal 12, owned by Red Salvadroeña de Medios, in turn owned by Albavisión. The channel carries programs from Canal 10, ATV, América Televisión, El Nueve and TV Azteca.

== History ==
In 2014, the Salvadoran government gave Remigio Ángel González a license to operate a station on channel 11, using an FMLN aide, as he had good relations with ruling government parties in other countries where he had a television station. González had been in the Salvadoran television market since the 1980s, but had pledged not to start a station due to a pact. This pact was broken on January 11, 2011, when one of his family members, Juan Carlos González Sáenz, founded TVRED, S.A. de C.V. and acquired a UHF frequency (channel 37) from the Francisco Gavidia University. For a while, the station (UFG TV) remained under the control of the university, but the frequency was already under the control of Albavisión. Per a resolution adopted on April 10, 2014, UFG TV would move to channel 11 and become TV Red, from the name of the licensee. SIGET revoked the license for channel 11 in late August. In October 2014, Superintendent of Telecommunications Blanca Coto ordered the shutdown of the VHF frequency, forcing it to return to channel 37. The act was condemned by the regional division of the Interamerican Press Society. On November 17, the three largest television companies, TCS, Grupo Megavisión and future sister station Canal 12, all condemned TVRED's broadcasts on channel 11, demanding it to continue on channel 37.

ASDER in February 2015 determined that the channel on VHF would benefit from better picture and sound, an "advantageous position" for the conversion to digital, which at the time, hadn't chosen the format to use.

On January 18, 2016, following the acquisition of Canal 12 by Albavisión, Red Salvadoreña de Medios was created and TV Red was renamed TUTV. The station was repositioned with emphasis on films and TV series as well as four news bulletins a day.
