= La Tele (disambiguation) =

La Tele was a Venezuelan television channel. It may also refer to:

- La Tele (Paraguayan TV channel), a Paraguayan television channel
- La Tele (show), a Colombian comedy television show originally produced by Carlos Vives
- La Tele (Peru), a Peruvian television network operated by Grupo ATV
- La Tele (Ecuador), an Ecuatorian channel television network
- Another name for Teledoce, an Uruguayan television network
