= RTU =

Rtu or RTU may refer to:

== Education ==
- Rajasthan Technical University, in Rajasthan, India
- Riga Technical University, in Riga, Latvia
- Rizal Technological University, in the Philippines
- RTU MIREA, Russian Technological University, Moscow

== Mass media ==
- RTU (Ecuador), an Ecuadorian television channel
- Chilevisión, formerly known as Red de Televisión de la Universidad de Chile

== Other uses ==
- Ṛtú, a Sanskrit word referring to a fixed or appointed time
- Ready to use (Ready-To-Use), used in Medicine, e.g. RTU Suspension for Injection
- Real Tamale United, a football club based in Tamale, Ghana
- Recognizable taxonomic unit, used in Parataxonomy
- Remote terminal unit, a microprocessor controlled electronic device
- Returned to unit, a British and Canadian military term
- Road to Ultra, music festival
- Roof top unit, a commercial air handler that sends hot or cold air
