= Telecuenca =

Defunct television station in Ecuador

- Quito; Ecuador
- Channels: Analog: 2 (VHF)

Ownership
- Owner: Catholic University of Cuenca

History
- First air date: September 15, 1967
- Last air date: August 15, 2025
- Former channel number: 3 (1967-1979)

Telecuenca, branded in its last five years on air as Academia TV, was a television station licensed to Cuenca, Ecuador. The station started as a commercial operation in 1967, but was sold to the Catholic University of Cuenca in 1975. It closed in 2025.

== History ==
Although television came to Quito (HCJB-TV) and Guayaquil (Primera Televisora Ecuatoriana) in 1959, it wouldn't be until the mid-late 1960s that television stations were set up in other key cities.

In 1967, Telecuador (owned by Organizaciones Norlop) assisted in the establishment of a television station in Cuenca to produce local programming. On August 15, 1967, broadcasts of Canal 3 Ciudad de Cuenca began, becoming regular on September 15. Víctor Hugo Morales was its manager. He later left to its station in Manta, which started broadcasting on July 20, 1968. Programming was transported from Telecuador's main station in Guayaquil, largely consisting of imports coming in from the United States, Mexico and Venezuela.

Over time, Norlop's finances deteriorated and it had no other solution than to close or sell its stations. For Canal 3 Ciudad de Cuenca, three options came: Banco del Pichincha, Jorge Piedra and the Catholic University of Cuenca. This last entity was chosen on the sale process of October 2, 1975, and resumed full-time operations under the new owners on April 8, 1976. At the time, there were truly national networks available to Cuencans, and Teleamazonas eyed potential usage of channel 3, which the Catholic University contested. The case took to the courts and, following a new frequency plan by IETEL, Teleamazonas got channel 11 and Canal 3 Ciudad de Cuenca got channel 2, both on May 10, 1979. With this, the station was renamed Telecuenca, being defined as an "educational Catholic channel".

In 2020, Telecuenca was rebranded Academia TV Canal Universitario as part of a brand repositioning exercise, hoping to engage more UCU students to take part in its programs.

== Shutdown ==
On August 5, 2025, it was reported that Telecuenca/Academia TV would shut down on August 15, after roughly fifty years on air, moving to an entirely online presence, without revealing further details. Its staff received a notification to end all programming.
