= RTS (Ecuadorian TV channel) =

Ecuadorian television network

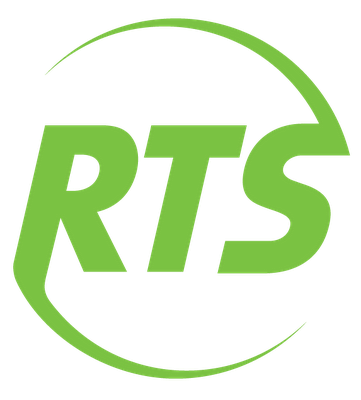
- Logo used since 2006
- Type: Free-to-air television network
- Country: Ecuador
- Broadcast area: Ecuador
- Headquarters: Guayaquil

Programming
- Language: Spanish
- Picture format: 1080i HDTV

Ownership
- Owner: Albavisión (Telecuatro Guayaquil C.A.)

History
- Launched: 12 December 1960; 65 years ago

Links
- Website: www.rts.com.ec

Availability

Terrestrial
- Analog VHF: Channel 4 (Guayaquil)
- Digital VHF: Channel 4.1/4.2 (Guayaquil)

RedTeleSistema (RTS), is a private television station in Ecuador. The channel is owned by Albavisión. The channel is the oldest television station to operate in Ecuador since its inception; HCJB-TV signed on in Quito in 1959 but shut down in 1972.

== History ==
What is now RTS was the first television station in Guayaquil. In 1959, José Rosenbaum bought some equipment from his native Germany. The first such experiment in Guayaquil was conducted on September 29, 1959, while the first program seen was a television version of Cocktail Deportivo, a radio program, sponsored by Leche Dos Nenes. After a few experiments the station signed on for the first time on December 12, 1960, running from 5pm to 10pm every evening. Rosenbaum cleared channel 4 in Guayaquil; in Quito, he planned to clear channel 11, 12 or 13.

The station was operated by Organizaciones Norlop, who signed an agreement with the American network ABC, who owned one third of the shares. The new company also set up channel 6 in Quito, and the holding company was later renamed Telecuador. The station in Quito signed on in 1962. At launch, its affiliate in Quito used the American method to organize its staff. Equipment came from German, French, Italian and American companies.

Its first newscast was aired at 9pm, for 10 minutes. Much of the filmed output, including successful American imports, was provided by ABC.

On September 15, 1967, Telecuador's station in Cuenca started broadcasting on channel 3, managed by Víctor Hugo Morales. He later left to its station in Manta, which started broadcasting on July 20, 1968.

In early 1970, ABC left Telecuador's operational structure. Its shares were divided between Genaro Parker from Guayaquil and Palm de TV from Panama. That same year, a microwave link was set up between the stations in Quito and Guayaquil. When Teleamazonas started broadcasting in color, the Telecuador staff went on strike due to the disadvantages caused by the new station, leading to the shutdown of the company. Following the strike, Telecuador was sold off and the Quito station was renamed Telecuatro. Telecuatro eventually shut down in 1979; its former sister operation in Quito resumed in 1976 with its old black-and-white equipment. Noboa bought the former Telecuatro shortly afterwards and renamed it Telecuatro Guayaquil. The crisis also affected smaller stations; the one in Cuenca was sold to the Catholic University of Cuenca on October 2, 1975, starting its new schedule the next year as Telecuenca.

On August 15, 1983, the station was put under the indirect control of Mexican-Guatemalan-American businessman Remigio Ángel González. González used the figurehead company Inversiones Fiduciarias to buy most of its shares. The main owner is Ecuadorian Maurilia Auxiliadora Jiménez, one of González's nephews. In 1985, Carlos Muñoz Insúa was appointed as its president. In 1995, the government approved new laws forbidding foreign companies to own more than 25% of media outlets. In 1997, following these new directives, Prolasa, registered in Panama, bought 25% of Telecuatro's shares, while the same amount for Ortel Quito was handed over to Belleville Investment, Inc., registered in the Bahamas. Both companies had Ángel González as its main shareholder. The 25% limits for foreign ownership were repealed in 2000 under the Trole II law, enabling González to enter the radio market and acquire UHF stations. By 2004, González's radio "quintuplets" were broadcasting from facilities adjacent to Telesistema's in Guayaquil.

On September 19, 2005, Telesistema presented its new identity as RTS. Ahead of the 2006 FIFA World Cup, RTS teamed up with Ecuavisa and Teleamazonas, rights holders, to form La Tri. In 2007, it invested more than US$10 million in the creation of new facilities; construction work started in March.

The launch of Televicentro in 2016 displaced RTS in Quito from channel 5 to channel 11, as Televicentro was also a national network from the outset.

== Notable presenters ==
Paola Cabezas presented the morning show El Club de la Mañana between 2007 and 2009.

== Sports events ==
- UEFA Champions League
- Olympic Games
