= Quito TV =

Television channel in Ecuador

- Country: Ecuador
- Broadcast area: National
- Headquarters: Quito, Pichincha Province, Ecuador

History
- Launched: August 25, 2006

Availability

Terrestrial
- VHF: Channel 20 (Quito); Channel 16 (Guayaquil)

Quito TV is a television channel in Ecuador. Since the start of their transmissions, on September 1 of 2006, the channel is the major television network of Ecuador.

It broadcasts on channel 20 to Quito and channel 16 to Guayaquil. The international version of the channel is available on Ecuador TV.

== History ==
Quito TV began broadcasting on September 1, 2006. Its headquarters are located in Quito, and the biggest self-supported antenna. Quito TV got the most powerful microwave radio relay, acquired the first mobile television unit.

Founded by Emilio Santander, the channel was under control of his family until 2007 and 2008. During the presidency of Rafael Correa, the network have the most broadcasting during the programming.

== Programming ==
Day	Programming
Monday-Friday	El Mañanero (6:00), Noticiero QTV (7:00), De Mañanita (9:00), El chico del departamento 5-12 (10:00), Rita Lasso (11:00), Noticiero QTV (12:00), La Taxista (14:00), Humor Amarillo (15:00), Chisme Ñañito, Chisme (15:30), La Familia P.Luche (16:00), Una familia con suerte (17:00), Victorious (17:30), iCarly (18:00), Big Time Rush (18:30), Noticiero QTV (19:00), Mis Vanidades (20:00), Porqué soy así (20:30), Bob Esponja (21:00), Las Zuquillo (21:30), El Privilegio (22:00).
Saturday	Diversión es Series (6:00), Noticiero QTV (12:00), Consejos de Doña Suggeidy (14:00), Diversión es Películas (15:00), Las noches de Quito TV (19:00), Los Capos de la risa (20:00), Día a Día (21:00).
Sunday	Santa Misa (6:00), Diversión es series (7:00), La Semana Política (9:00), Noticiero QTV (12:00), Aliméntate (14:00), Semana es Resumen (15:00), Copa Credifé (16:00), Mi Recinto 2012 (18:00), El Garañón del Millón (18:30), Noticiero QTV (19:00), Q'Viva (20:00), Futuro Incierto (21:00).

== Soccer Broadcasts ==
Quito TV has the rights to broadcast the home games of Deportivo Quito, Espoli, Imbabura, LDU Quito and Manta during the 2011 Copa Credife.
