= Public News Agency of Ecuador and South America =

Official digital information service of the Ecuadorian State

- Agencia Pública de Noticias del Ecuador y Suramérica

Digital information service overview
- Formed: December 29, 2009
- Jurisdiction: National Secretariat of Communications
- Headquarters: Quito

The Public News Agency of Ecuador and South America (Andes) (Spanish: Agencia Pública de Noticias del Ecuador y Suramérica (ANDES)) is the official digital information service of the Ecuadorian State. Andes is a public media organisation which provides regional and national news coverage, as well as general information on Latin America. The agency also provides multimedia services including an image bank.

Andes was established on 29 December 2009 on the initiative of the National Secretariat of Communications and is now a business unit of Ecuador TV. The organisation is headquartered in Quito in the Public Media Building, from which all state mass media functions. The organisation also has 3 zones locations in Guayaquil, Loja and Tulcán.
