= Canal 8 (Salvadoran TV channel) =

Agape TV (Canal 8)
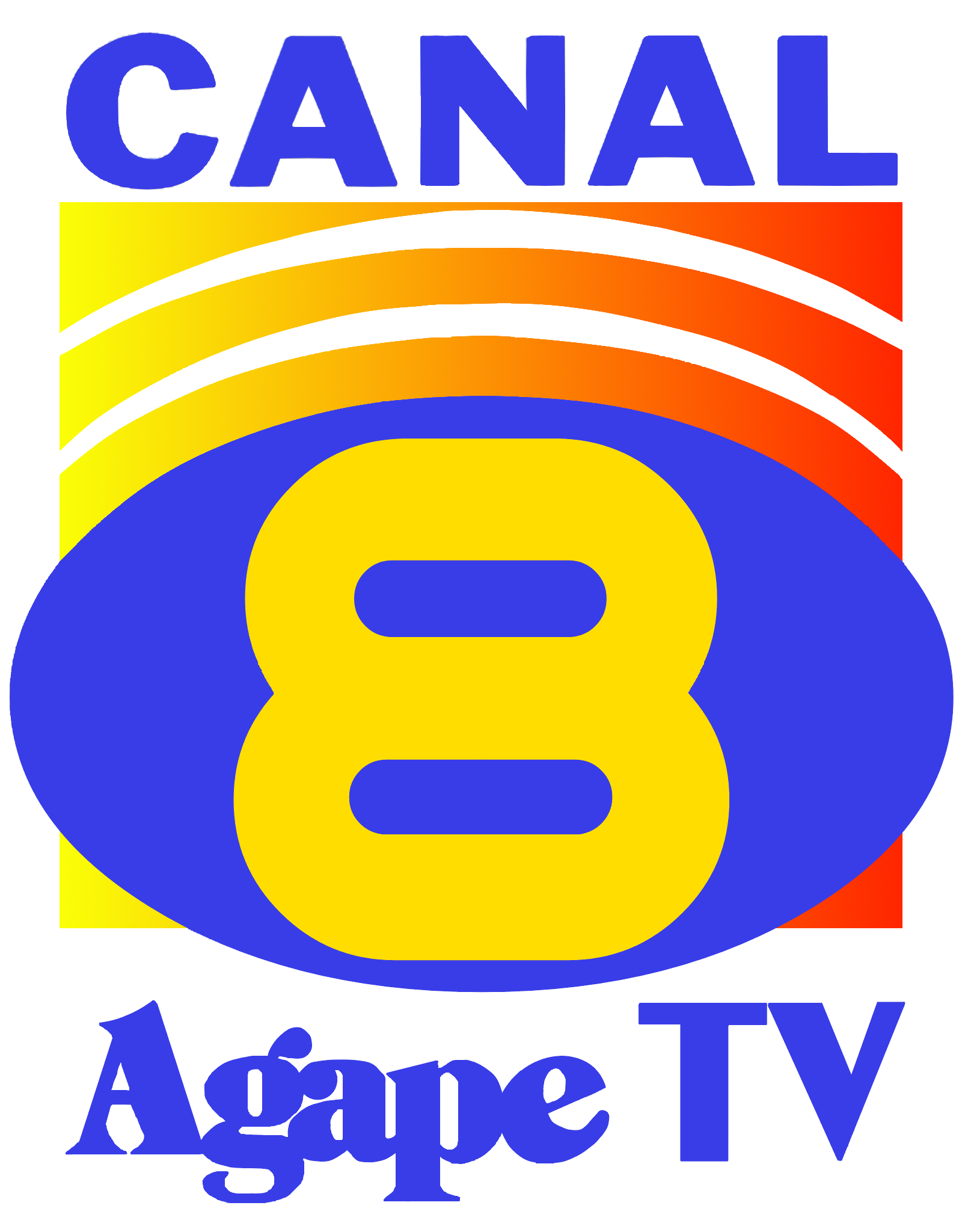
- Country: El Salvador
- Headquarters: Calle Gerardo Barrios No. 1511, Col. Cucumacayán San Salvador, El Salvador

Programming
- Language(s): Spanish
- Picture format: 480i SDTV

Ownership
- Owner: Agape (El Salvador)

History
- Launched: 6 June 2001; 23 years ago
- Former names: YSWE-TV 8 (1964–1996)

Links
- Website: agapetv8.com

Availability

Terrestrial
- Analog VHF: Channel 8

Canal 8 is the flagship TV Channel of the Agape Association of El Salvador founded by Fray Flavian Mucci, CEO of the religious company. It is the first of 24 hour broadcasting channel of El Salvador.

== History ==
=== Background ===
Channel 8 was created by the Ministry of Education on 4 November 1964, and together with Channel 10 were broadcast from 1969 to 1989. Since then it was the educational channel according to the academic levels and produce cultural programs for adults. It was not until 1987, when Channel 8 was repetitive of Channel 10 for two years. And in 1989, Channel 8 was suspended until 1994.

=== Developing ===
After five years the suspension of the transmission, Channel 8 was acquired by Agape for its transmission based on religion in May 1999. After being assigned to AGAPE, the Administration of the Technological Institute of Sonsonate (ITSO), the Government of El Salvador, through the Ministry of Education, delivered the Frequency of Channel 8 of Television to the Technological Institute of Sonsonate and the Agape Association of El Salvador for 20 years, appointing Agape TV (Channel 8), and it was broadcast for the first time on 6 June 2001.

From this moment, the independent era of communications began for Channel 8. Agape TV made a Project whose mission and challenge is to create, implement and develop a program with captivating profile in accordance with the Christian, educational and cultural objectives and principles, that pretends to be present in a pluralistic world of mass media, carrying out a process of Christian education, with the promotion of a critical respect that does not allow the depersonification and massification of the human community of El Salvador.

== Programming ==
The channel is made of religious programs, family entertainment, pastoral programs, and occasionally cultural and educational programs.
