= Canal 4 (Costa Rica) =

Television channel in Costa Rica

- Country: Costa Rica

Programming
- Picture format: 1080i HDTV (downscaled to 480i for the SDTV feed)

Ownership
- Owner: Repretel
- Sister channels: Canal 6 Canal 11; CDR 2

History
- Launched: 1965; 61 years ago
- Former names: TV Cuatro (1998–2000); Multivisión (1981–1998); TV4 (1974-1981); Tic Tac Canal 4 (1969-1974)

Availability

Terrestrial
- Digital VHF: Channel 4.1; Channel 6.2

Canal 4 is a private Costa Rican television channel, owned and operated by Repretel. It was the second television station acquired by Repretel in Costa Rica. The station broadcasts on channel 6.2 which the frequency is used by sister channel Canal 6 due to the original frequency being impossible to convert to digital until 2021.

== History ==
The company was founded in 1965 under the name Radio-Televisión Tic-Tac Limitada, founded by Arnoldo Vargas and his family. In 1990, the channel (at the time the owner had changed its name to Multivisión de Costa Rica) started airing a high-rated newscast, Noticentro 4.

At the end of March 1998, TV Azteca bought the channel and renamed it TV Cuatro. In order to improve its equipment, its owners needed an investment worth 716 million colones.

The station was acquired from TV Azteca, when the Mexican company decided to sell their Latin American television stations in Costa Rica, Guatemala, El Salvador and Chile to invest in their mobile services in Mexico. At the time of the sale, TV Azteca still owed money to original owners and responsible of Channel 9 operations. Since Repretel was sub-leasing Channel 9 from TV Azteca at the time, the process of the sale was seamless. Repretel also tried searching for a new formula for the channel.

Repretel took control of the station on March 13, 2000, defavoring Canal 9, which had become a repeater.

At this time, the channel's schedule consisted primarily of entertainment shows (mostly from Telemundo and Univisión) primarily aimed at women. On June 9, 2003, it interchanged schedules with Repretel 11 and the daily block of cartoons transferred to this channel.

== Programming ==
Repretel 4 programming consists of kids shows, cartoons, anime, juvenile soap operas, daily nightly movies and Caso Cerrado.
The station has low advertising demand and depends on infomercials and Repretel 6 ads to keep running. Some programs of the channel are: America’s Next Top Model, Survivor, NCIS, Alerta Cobra, Highlander: The Series, Funniest Pets and People, The Planet’s Funniest Animals, Animal Atlas, SAF3, Numb3rs, Leverage.
