= Repretel 6 =

Canal 6
- Country: Costa Rica

Programming
- Picture format: 1080i HDTV

Ownership
- Owner: Repretel (Albavision)
- Sister channels: Canal 4 Canal 11; CDR 2

History
- Launched: September 12, 1965; 60 years ago
- Former names: Telecentro Canal 6 (1965-1995)

Availability

Terrestrial
- Digital VHF: Channel 6.1

Canal 6 (previously known as Telecentro) is a private Costa Rican television channel, owned and operated by Repretel. It is the flagship TV station of the media group.

== History ==
The channel was founded on September 12, 1965 as Telecentro Canal 6, led by Costa Rican and Panamanian investors, led by Mario Sotela Pacheco and support from the US network NBC. Early in its history it also had shares from Spanish company Movierecord. The station would become the main competitor of Teletica and had an agreement with Mexican network Televisa to air its programming.

In 1976, the station launched its newscast (Notiseis). By then it had bought Telesistema Nacional (channel 2) and made it a partial relayer of Telecentro, which remained this way until 1982.

In 1995 under tough TV market conditions, the Corporación Costarricense de Televisión of the Sotela family, decided to lease the TV station to Repretel for 10 years. Its largest shareholder, Mario Sotela Blen, became a part of Repretel 6's directive as a "commercial associate". By 2007, the lease ended, and Repretel bought the station, ending the rumors of Telecentro Canal 6's comeback. It became the third owned and operated station of the group and flagship of the other two.

== Programming ==
Main programming consists of imported shows and soap operas from Univision and Telemundo, also has three daily news programs and carries sports programming of the network, especially Liga Deportiva Alajuelense, Club Sport Herediano, Costa Rica national football team and Fifa World Cup football games.
