= Ecuador TV =

EcuadorTV
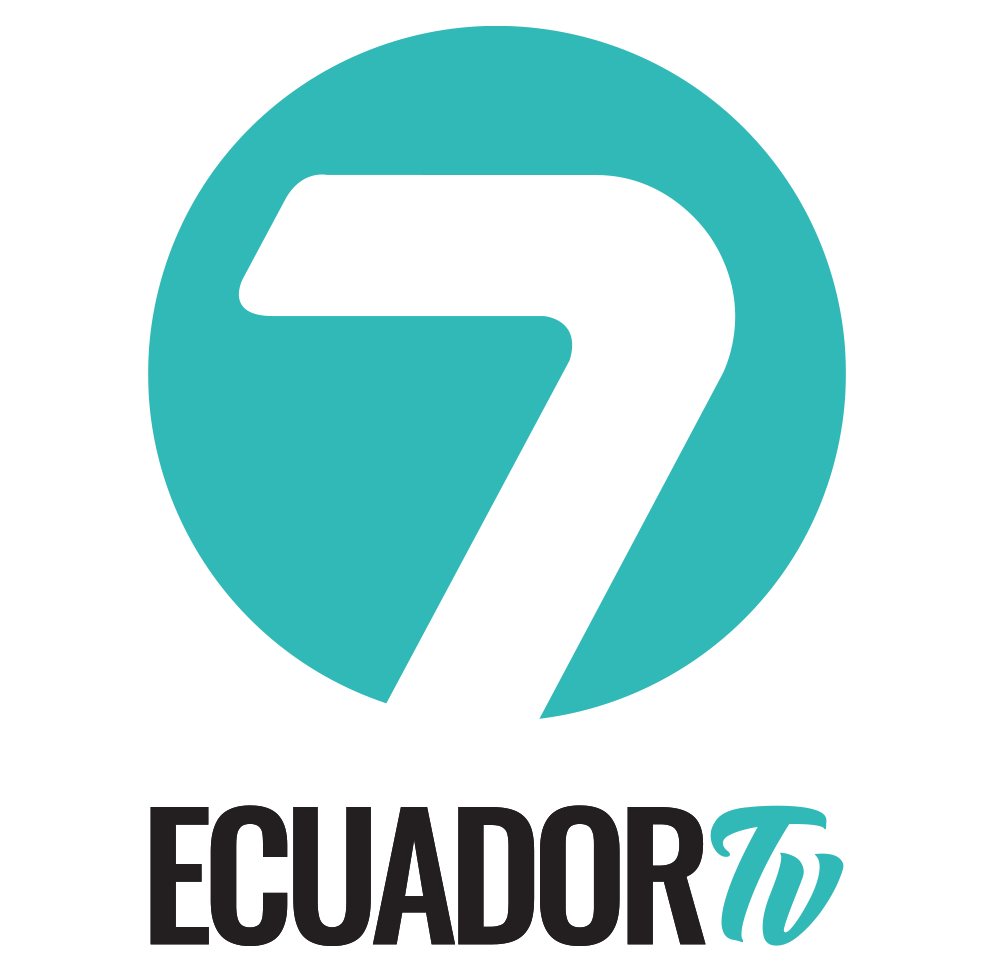
- Type: Free-to-air television network
- Country: Ecuador
- Broadcast area: Worldwide

Programming
- Picture format: 1080i HDTV

Ownership
- Owner: Comunica EP

History
- Launched: November 29, 2007 (experimental); April 1, 2008 (regular)

Links
- Website: EcuadorTV.ec

Availability

Terrestrial
- Digital VHF: Channel 7.1
- Analog VHF: Channel 7 (Quito)

Streaming media
- EcuadorTV.ec: EcuadorTV (free stream)

Ecuador TV is the public service channel of Ecuador established in October 2007 thanks to a provision of non-reimbursable funds of $5 million of the Economic and Social Development Bank of Venezuela (BANDES by its Spanish acronym). It is operated by the state entity Comunica EP.

The channel was established at the same time as the installation of the Ecuadorian Constituent Assembly so that the sessions could be transmitted live to all the country.

== History ==
Logo used from 2007 to 2014.

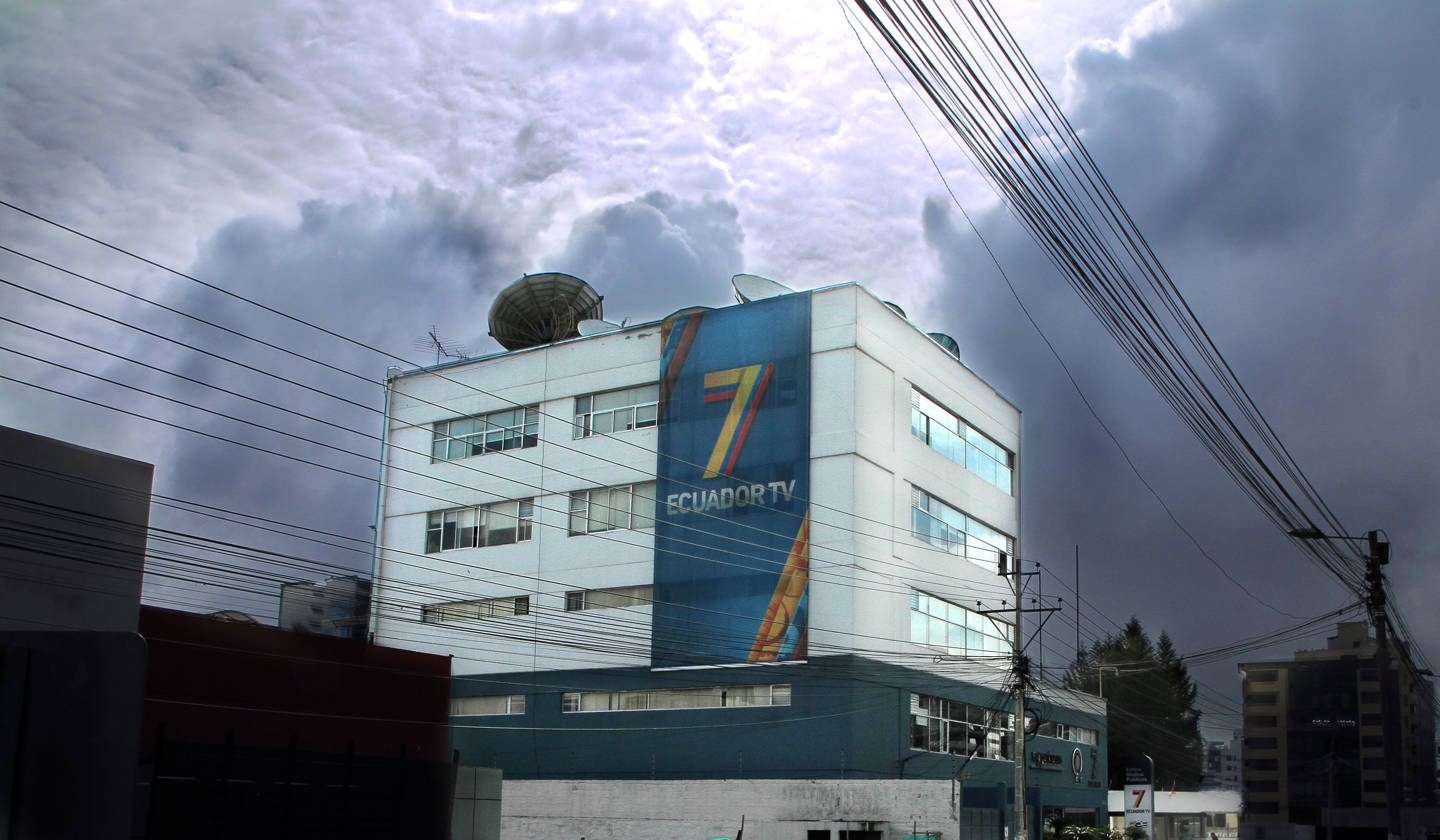
Ecuador TV's HQ by 2014

Ecuador was one of the last countries in South America to gain a state-owned television station. For decades, the television landscape was dominated by private broadcasters. This was a side effect of massive deregulation of the market, which led to 90% of the media sector dominated by no less than eight groups.

In the government of Sixto Durán Ballén, the State gave frequencies without considering that the spectrum was an intangible part of the nation, which should be technically administered by the respective entity of the government in turn and without political meddling favoring a party.

In 2003, the government reserved two UHF frequencies for later use for television broadcasting: 48 and 49. By 2004, the number of UHF stations increased. The arrival of Rafael Correa to the presidency of Ecuador eased the creation of the network, conceiving it in 2006. He would later acquire TC Televisión and Gamavisión with the fall of Grupo Isaías.

As part of a grant from Correa's presidential campaign, the plan for Televisión Pública del Ecuador (Ecuadorian Public Television), and following public consultation, the Montecristi National Constitutive Assembly was created. An injection of capital from Venezuelan fund BANDES followed. The government announced the launch of the network on February 22, 2007, where it was also mentioned that it would join Telesur as a member. It was initially scheduled to launch on August 10 that year, coinciding with the anniversary of Ecuador's Declaration of Independence. The network was set to broadcast on the UHF band - all VHF channels were private - and would later be sent by satellite to reach key Ecuadorian diasporas in Spain, the United States and other countries.

The social status of the parent company of the channel, Televisión Nacional de Ecuador TEVECUADOR S.A. was changed to Televisión y Radio de Ecuador S.A. RTVECUADOR.

The channel made its first broadcast on November 29, 2007, with an interview to Rafael Correa. Full broadcasts started only on April 1, 2008 in Quito and Guayaquil, airing a promotional video featuring its launch programming. It had an initial team of 20 people.

On March 24, 2011, the channel started test broadcasts on VHF channel 7 in Quito, with the aim of eventually switching off its UHF slot on channel 48. The move was seen with opposition from private operators such as Ecuavisa and Canal 18. By 2014, it had over 100 transmitters nationwide, making it have the largest coverage out of any Ecuadorian network.

== Programming ==
The channel transmits content by independent national and international producers and documentaries and news programs from several international producing properties such as Discovery, TVE, BBC, Deutsche Welle, Voice of America, ViVe and teleSUR.

The channel operates as a public service company, and broadcasts news and opinion content from several countries, including the United States. The Venezuelan government described its monetary contribution to the creation of the channel, as "a caring and selfless contribution of Venezuela as part of the policy of international cooperation in the region that drives the government of President Hugo Chávez".

In preparation for its launch, the channel acquired a raft of children's titles at the NAF fair in Las Vegas, becoming the most watched channel among children. After an initial year where the channel tried to find its own identity, it started airing three daily news bulletins, as well as Palabra Suelta with Xavier Laso and Lo Público with María Isabel Cevallos. These in-house productions paved way for independent productions, especially documentaries from independent filmmakers.

In the early 2010s, in order to become more lucrative, Ecuador TV made a drastic change to its lineup, adding more commercial programming. One such move was acquiring A Escrava Isaura from the Record network of Brazil. Its airing worked well, surpassing the ratings of its news and opinion programming. Its children's block, Zona 7, now included Disney series, targeting both pre-schoolers and school-age kids.

== See also ==
- Public News Agency of Ecuador and South America
