= RTU (Ecuador) =

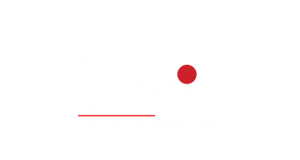
- Country: Ecuador
- Broadcast area: Ecuador

Programming
- Picture format: 480i SDTV

Ownership
- Owner: Radio y Televisión Unida del Ecuador

History
- Launched: January 10, 2005

Links
- Website: www.canalrtu.tv

Radio y Televisión Unida, better known as RTU or Canal RTU, is an Ecuadorian over-the-air television network. Based in the capital Quito, it was historically known as el canal de las noticias (the news channel) because of its news operation.

== History ==
RTU started broadcasting on January 10, 2005, and, by 2013, was available over-the-air on channel 46 in Quito, 30 in Guayaquil, 29 in Cuenca and 28 in Ambato. For the 2013-2014 television season, it introduced a new logo (from a plain uppercase wordmark to a lowercase stylized wordmark with dots in the middle of the U) and a new slogan, todos somos noticia, using a black, gray and red color scheme.

RTU's offices in Guayaquil were hit by a robbery at 1:30am on March 26, 2012, stealing US$20,000 worth of equipment.

Supercom sanctioned RTU on October 26, 2015 for airing violent material on the 1pm edition of El Informativo two months before (on August 26) for its coverage of the murders of two staff of WDBJ in a timeslot meant for all ages.

A reporting team of the channel was assaulted at a bus in Quito on May 5, 2026, when trying to report the rise in violent robberies at local buses.
