= Repretel 11 =

Canal 11
- Country: Costa Rica

Programming
- Picture format: 1080i HDTV

Ownership
- Owner: Repretel (Albavisión)
- Sister channels: Canal 6 Canal 4 CDR 2

History
- Launched: 1969

Links
- Website: www.repretel.com

Availability

Terrestrial
- Digital VHF: Channel 11.1

Canal 11 is a private Costa Rican television channel, owned and operated by Repretel since 1996. It was the first station owned and operated by Repretel-Albavision group in Costa Rica.

== History ==
It was founded in 1968 by Juan Edgar Picado Trejos and a US investor. Broadcasts started the following year as the first television station in Central America to broadcast in color, but the government temporarily restricted its license to operate by means of a presidential decree, causing a legal battle in the process. The decree stated that the investor was American and should have had a Costa Rican work permit, even though he wasn't working for the channel. After a few months, Televictoria won the appeal and resumed broadcasts. In 1971, its color broadcasts became regular, and, from 1974, full-time. The station was initially known as Televictoria (TV Victoria in some sources) and was renamed Canal 11 in 1973.

As an independent operation, the station had a news bulletin (Reporte 11), whose first director was Eduardo Enrique Leiva. On weeknights at 10pm, the station presented Telegatunas, hosted by Hugo Araya, a program devoted to celebrity gossip, and before sign-off, La Última Tanda, which presented vintage Hollywood movies.

The channel struggled to compete against Teletica and Telecentro (which in the 90s ended up becoming a sister station); due to debts, the station was sold to Swiss businessman Franz Ulrich in 1977. Beginning in July 1983, the station was rented to Teletica, who relayed most of the main station's schedule, and was even used to relay a US Catholic network. In 1992, Teletica and Franz Ulrich left due to a mismanagement from the leasing company operating the station, forcing the sale; Repretel was growing fast, leasing Channel 9 and 6; became the first TV-station owned and operated in Costa Rica.

In 1996, the channel briefly relayed channel 6. On March 1, 1997, it became independent again, airing a schedule consisting primarily of imported cartoons and telenovelas. On June 9, 2003, the channel interchanged schedules with Repretel 4 and changed focus to Latin American entertainment, including news and variety shows from Telemundo and Univisión.

== Programming ==
Channel 11 is the second most watched channel on the network, behind Repretel 6, its programming consists of productions by TelevisaUnivision, Telemundo, Caracol Televisión, TV Azteca, Telefe, América Televisión, TVN, RCN Televisión and Venevisión.
