= HCJB-TV =

Defunct television station in Ecuador

- Quito; Ecuador
- Channels: Analog: 4 (VHF)

Ownership
- Owner: HCJB

History
- First air date: August 10, 1959
- Last air date: 1972
- Former channel number: 2 (1959-1961)
- Call sign meaning: Hoy Cristo Jesús Bendice, the backronym of the HCJB radio calls

HCJB-TV, also branded as La Ventana de los Andes (The Window of the Andes) was an Ecuadorian television station owned by the HCJB radio ministry. It was the first television station of any sort to exist in Ecuador.

== History ==
In 1954, Gillford "Giff" Hartwell arrived voluntarily to Ecuador to deliver equipment for a television station to be owned by HCJB, which would be used to expand its extant operations.

Later, on July 25, 1959, Dick Benoit and Kerm Beougher, distributed several television receivers in several areas of Quito and on the 28th of the same month HCJB-TV made its first experimental broadcast, carrying movies dubbed in Spanish and provided by the United States Embassy, to great public acclaim.

On July 30, the station formally identified itself with its call letters borrowed from the radio station (HCJB) and the name La Ventana de los Andes. The following day, broadcasts formally started with the television adaptation of the radio program Adelante Juventud (Onward Youth).

On August 10, 1959, HCJB-TV began regular transmissions. 250 television sets already existed in Quito ahead of its launch. The station initially broadcast two hours of programming three nights a week, increasing to four hours nightly later on. In restaurants, viewers paid one sucre to watch the station during their dinners. After the launch of HCJB-TV, television sales skyrocketed. Early on, it employed 35 Ecuatorian staff and 105 from abroad: from Japan, the Soviet Union and other countries.

HCJB-TV's early years were clouded due to a lack of regulations regulating television in Ecuador, causing it to broadcast a merely experimental service at first. Regulations were imposed on December 5, 1959, promulgated by President Camilo Ponce Enríquez. However, the official permit for HCJB-TV would only arrive on May 18, 1961, being the second authorization at the national level, after channel 4 in Guayaquil, with that, the channel continued its regular broadcasts, moving from channel 2 to channel 4 to avoid interference with the radio signals of the Ecuadorian police and army.

The station was suffering from competition coming from new television stations, prompting the board of trustees to review its operations in 1972. Among the proposals made were the conversion of HCJB to a color service while continuing its religious programming and adding more secular programming to attract more viewers. Ultimately the decision was made to sell the station. The frequency is now occupied by Teleamazonas while the initial frequency (channel 2) was claimed by Telenacional.

== Programming ==
HCJB-TV broadcast a mixture of religious and secular programming. The religious programming was derived from its existing radio operations. On Sunday nights, the station televised the Radio Chapel in Spanish.

The staff was given a day off for Christmas and the New Year. At Christmas in its later years (1965–1971), the station aired the stop-motion Rudolph the Red-Nosed Reindeer special by NBC.

== Aftermath ==
Following the decision to sell the television station in Quito, HCJB's television division moved to Puerto Rico to produce content for other television stations in color. After a few years, the staff returned to Quito for the same purpose.
