= CDR Canal 2 =

CDR 2
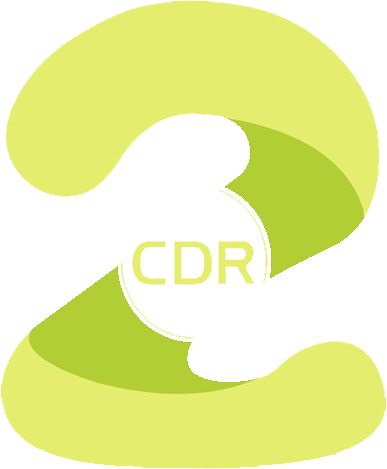
- Country: Costa Rica
- Broadcast area: Costa Rica

Programming
- Picture format: 480i SDTV

Ownership
- Owner: Central de Radios (Repretel)

History
- Launched: August 28, 1966
- Former names: Telenac Canal 2 Univisión Canal 2 TV2; Conexión TV

Availability

Terrestrial
- Digital VHF: Channel 2.1; Channel 11.2

CDR Canal 2 is a Costa Rican music television channel. The frequency belonged to Roxie Blen until 2011 when the station was sold to Central de Radios, a unit of Repretel. The channel broadcasts on digital channel 11.2 which is used for its sister channel Canal 11 due to the frequency being impossible to convert to digital until 2021. The channel was previously owned by Univisión de Costa Rica S.A. which was named as Univisión Canal 2 until 2000.

It was set up in 1965 by a former Teletica employee, who later sold the station to Telecentro Canal 6 (who would ironically become its sister station in 2011), becoming a mere relay. Broadcasts started at 7pm on August 28, 1966.

The station regained its independence in 1982, airing a varied menu of Mexican and Brazilian telenovelas.

The channel provides visual radio services, toggling between the programs of Monumental, Reloj, Exa, Best FM and Z FM.
