= Canal 12 (Salvadoran TV channel) =

TV channel in El Salvador

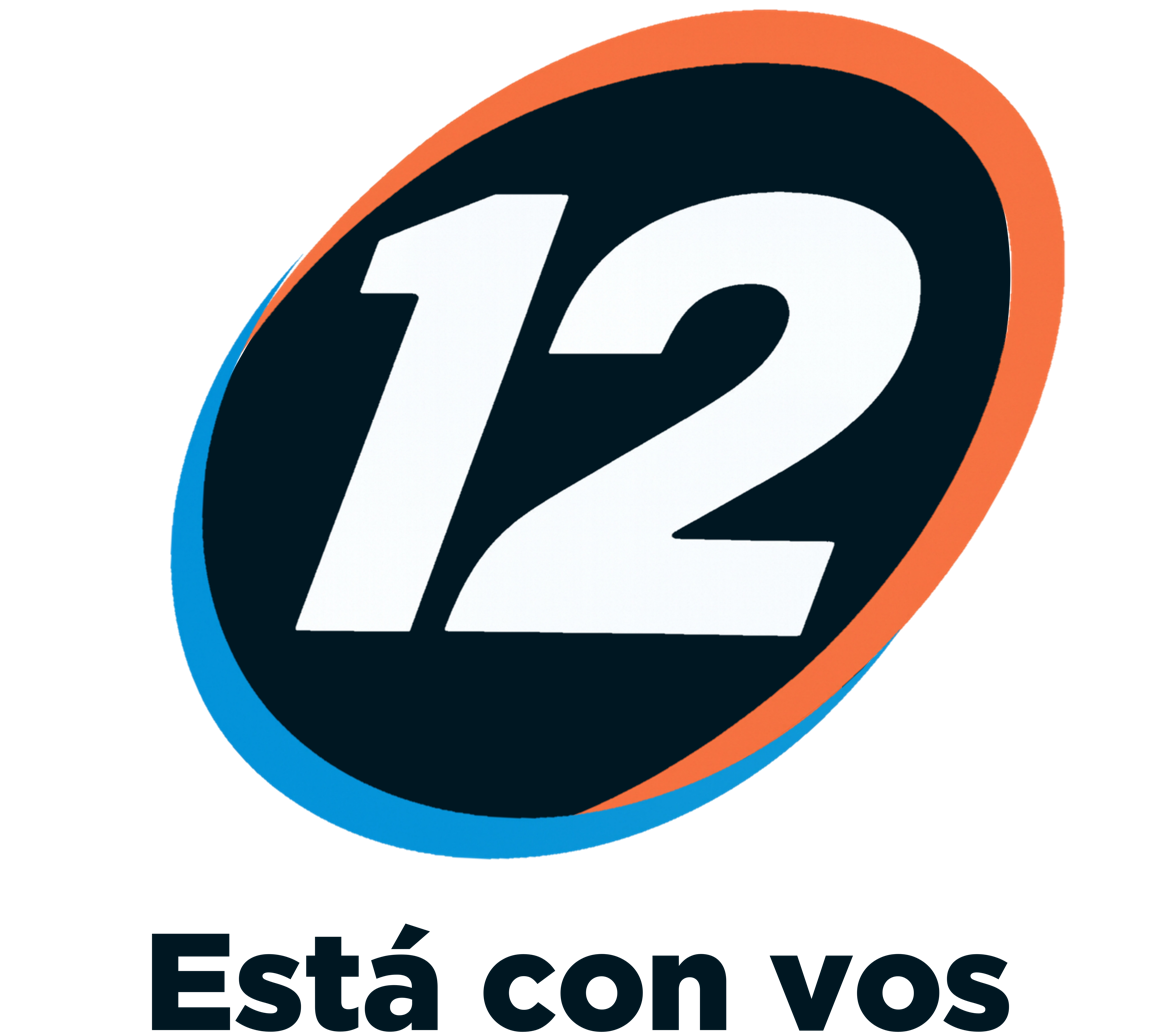
- Country: El Salvador
- Headquarters: Antiguo Cuscatlán, La Libertad

Programming
- Language: Spanish
- Picture format: 720p HDTV

Ownership
- Owner: Red Salvadoreña de Medios (Albavisión)
- Sister channels: YSTU (Channel 11)

History
- Launched: 15 December 1984; 40 years ago
- Founder: Jorge Emilio Zedán
- Former names: YSWX-TV 12 (1984–1997); TV Doce (1997–2003)

Links
- Website: www.canal12.com.sv

Availability

Terrestrial
- Analog VHF: Channel 12

Canal 12 (legally known as YSWX-TV) is a Salvadoran television channel owned by Red Salvadoreña de Medios. The station was founded by Jorge Emilio Zedán on 15 December 1984. Since its affiliation to the Albavisión media network, its greatest success has been the strengthening of its information system and the transmission of international sports content.

== History ==
=== Creation and early years ===
In 1985, under the leadership of the Salvadoran-Palestinian businessman, Jorge Emilio Zedán (1935–2012), YSWX began a second phase of its history, breaking with the traditional schemes of Salvadoran television, with its advertising phrase Canal 12 dares to occupy a place in the minds of Salvadorans, especially from the news, because as expressed in his second slogan, he dared to present content in a way that had never been seen before in the country. Through its Newsletter and the large number of programs that were produced in their studios, totaling some 24 programs that had to be produced for the weekly program, so their motto changed to "Lo Hacemos Aquí (We do it here)". A few months after starting the Zedán stage, its facilities were moved to another large residential house located on Avenida las Magnolias, always in Colonia San Benito, which was also conditioned to operate as a television station, having to be built two Studios and a theater for live programs with audience. It was more than 25 years ago when in the middle of the Civil War in El Salvador, where a group of journalists began the task of forming a channel where the backbone of it is the information of national events at that crucial and transcendent moment of Salvadoran history.

In the middle of May 1992, Narciso Castillo leaves the direction of the Noticiero to the day and decides to found another television channel -Megavision El Salvador- and with him, more than 45 people renounce their positions and organize themselves to found this channel. Several journalists and presenters disappear from the screen of Channel 12

=== The new generation ===
In May 1996 a strategic alliance was signed with the second most important Mexican television station: TV Azteca. As a result of this alliance, on Wednesday, 1 January 1997, TV Azteca acquired 75 percent of the shares of Canal 12 and became the majority shareholder, in partnership with Jorge Emilio Zedán and the Salvadoran-Palestinian entrepreneur, Armando Bukele Kattán. With this change, Channel 12 becomes TV Doce and Noticiero a Día is now called Noticiero Hechos, still a reference of Salvadoran television.

In September 1999, TV Doce became the first Salvadoran channel capable of reporting on the People's Republic of China, and in November 2000 it was the only Salvadoran media outlet that conducted an exclusive interview with Cuban leader Fidel Castro.

On Tuesday, 19 January 2016, the acquisition of the channel by Albavisión was officially confirmed, since on that day newspapers published in major newspapers and on social networks published articles informing that on Monday, 18 January, the company was founded the Red Salvadoreña de Medios (RSM), the holding that the channel belongs to since then, this information can also be checked on the official Albavisión website.
