= La Tele (Ecuador) =

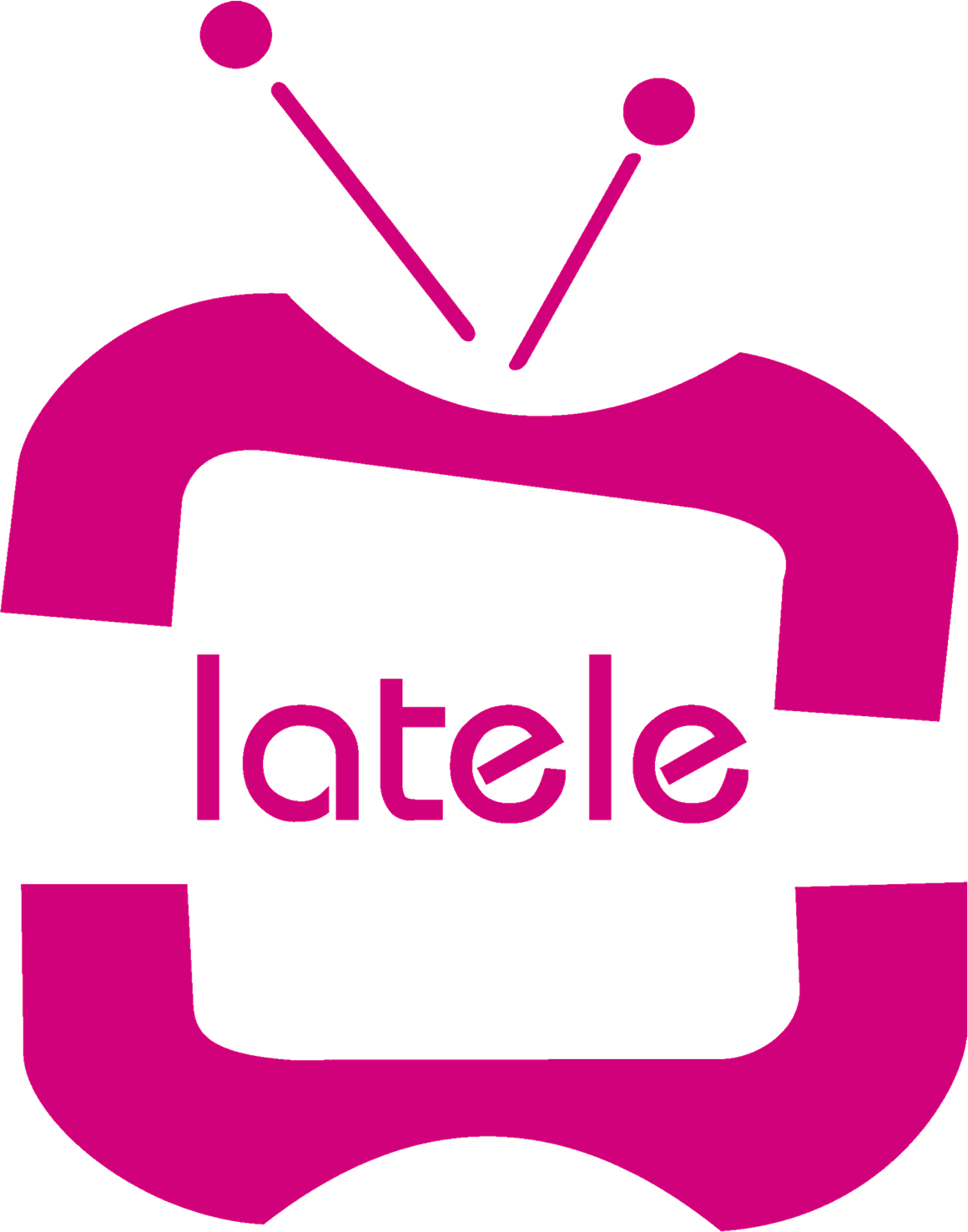
- Country: Ecuador
- Broadcast area: Guayaquil

Programming
- Picture format: 480i SDTV

Ownership
- Owner: Indetel S.A. (Televisiete S.A.)
- Parent: Albavisión

History
- Launched: 1997
- Former names: Costavisión and Andivisión (1997–2004); Kanal 38 (2004–2006); Red TV Ecuador (2006–2011)

Links
- Website: www.latele.com.ec

Availability

Terrestrial
- Analog UHF: Channel 38 (Guayaquil); Channel 38 (Quito)

La Tele is an Ecuadorian television channel owned by Albavisión. Its programming consists primarily in foreign content that previously aired on RTS. The station is owned by Indetel, a company owned by a figurehead of Remigio Ángel González, and is a part of his Albavisión conglomerate.

== History ==
The network has its origins in 1997 in Guayaquil with Costavisión and 1998 in Quito with Andivisión. Andivisión also operated one of González' radio stations in Ecuador, Tropicálida Stereo. On June 17, 2002, the channel's operating company, Indetel, was acquired by Chan Chang, one of González's aides. The stations were renamed Kanal 38 in 2004.

In 2006, the stations were renamed again, this time to Red TV Ecuador. In 2010, during the cartoon slots, the channel was known for airing dating services searching for casual relations in a ticker at the bottom of the screen.

Red TV was renamed La Tele on April 11, 2011, also adopting the logo of its sister Peruvian channel in the process. Local programming included Ciento por ciento música (2–3 minutes a day, every day of the week), Moda and En cuerpo y mente. The bulk of the programming remained foreign, with international TV series from 2pm to 8pm and 10pm to 12am (sign-off), cartoons from 7am to 2pm and feature films at 8pm. The channel promoted its rebrand under the "if cable was for free, it would be La Tele" campaign.
