= Canal 10 (Salvadoran TV channel) =

- Country: El Salvador

Programming
- Picture format: 1080i HDTV (downscaled to 480i for the SDTV feed)

Ownership
- Owner: Government of El Salvador

History
- Launched: 4 November 1964; 60 years ago
- Former names: TVE (Televisión Educativa) de El Salvador (1964-1985); Televisión Nacional (1986-1990); TVCE (Televisión Cultural Educativa) (1990-1993); TVCE (Televisión Cultural Educativa) / TV CONCULTURA (1993-1996); Canal 10 (1996-2010); Televisión Nacional de El Salvador (TVES) (2010-2013); Televisión de El Salvador (TVES) (2013-2019)

Links
- Website: Noticiero El Salvador

Availability

Terrestrial
- Analog VHF: Channel 10
- Digital VHF: Channel 10.1 (SD); Channel 10.2 (HD); Channel 10.3 (1 sec. delay)

Canal 10, previously known as Televisión de El Salvador (TVES) (in Spanish: El Salvador Television) is El Salvador's public television service with the YSTVE signal. It was founded by the Government of El Salvador on November 4, 1964 with channels 8 and 10. By the year 1989, Channel 10 followed its transmissions when channel 8 separated from the affiliation, and has been reorganized in its operations that have increased with the passage of time.

== History ==
=== Background ===
In 1960, the Minister of Education, Ernesto Revelo Borja, raised the possibility of carrying out an educational reform, in such a way that, through audiovisual support, the teacher feels motivated to improve the level of education, while the student manages to understand the classes in a better way. This reform, of Educational Television, pursues the collaboration with education in the following areas:

- Allow the training of the teacher, promoting their professional improvement, as well as equipping him with methods, scientific and didactic concepts.
- Give opportunity for people in rural areas, who generally did not have the same advantages as people in the urban area, to have access to a good quality education provided by qualified teachers, using the appropriate didactic and methodological resources.
- Take pictures, which by other means is very difficult to present to students, making classes more enjoyable as is the case of space flights, interviews with intellectuals, complete panoramas of ruins, factories, machinery, etc. It is also possible to present in a few minutes a sequence that in reality takes a long time to complete. For example: Cell multiplication, the germination of a seed, the growth of a plant, the birth of an animal, etc.
- Provide a contribution of quality and quantity, since it serves as a transmitting vehicle of culture and education for many people.

=== Development and early years ===
On November 4, 1964, a commission formed by government, industrial, commercial, and agricultural sectors was born in El Salvador Television, in charge of analyzing the possibilities of creating a national educational television service, for which it was assisted by the Japanese government that was in charge of carrying out the technical studies of the installation needs to be able to have transmission and reception in the different educational centers where it was desired to carry out the education plan by audiovisual means, controlled directly by the Ministry of Education .

Channel 10 had in its beginnings a general programming that served as daily teaching for the students of the different schools. The teacher lit the television where a video of a specific class was presented and then it continued with the traditional teaching: support in methodological books that had been developed according to the content given in the study programs. This led to discussion with the teachings exposed through television.

In this way, TVES became the first country in Central America that had the necessary resources to have an educational channel, since the demographic factors were very favorable for its projection. But the growth of educational television in El Salvador was very slow, even when a group of young people were sent to Japan for training and when they returned and did not find the necessary equipment, they were limited to not having an adequate television system. But in 1966, ways to meet the country's educational needs through TV are discussed. Educational Its director, Dr. Irma Lanzas de Chávez, studied the experience of other countries to be able to project and look for alternatives that would help the projection. UNESCO, created to help the dissemination of education and culture in all Latin American countries, presented seven teachers who would form the first production team of Educational Television. Over time, these people became filmmakers, presenters, screenwriters, etc.

By 1967, there were three television stations dedicated mainly to primary education and that later developed programs for an adult audience for literacy and community development purposes. That same year, the Educational Cultural Television studios were inaugurated, in Ciudad Normal Alberto Masferrer, in San Andrés, by President Lyndon B. Johnson of the United States. and the president-elect of El Salvador Fidel Sánchez Hernández. It was considered that Educational Television would compensate the shortage of teachers that existed in the country at that time, and could give way to televised classes. However, in 1968, Televisión Educativa carried out experimental programs and at the same time conducted training courses in the studios and commercial facilities in San Salvador, while building its own production center. That's how they started with the transmissions a year later.

=== TVES in the era of the Civil War ===
Ten years later, in 1979, the Directorate of Educational Television was established in the Ministry of Education with an internal structure of Management and Administration, Planning and Production, Audiovisual Resources, Operations and Maintenance, and Dubbing Department. In this way, Televisión Cultural Educativa focused on promoting culture in El Salvador and collaborating with the training and training of teachers, for the implementation of new study programs, in order to help the country's education system. With the beginnings of Educational Television, there is an openness to relations with countries and international organizations with experience in this field, thus receiving help for its personnel from the US, Japan, Brazil and Mexico. But the development of educational television had different changes and studies from different universities in other countries, so it went through many evolutions in its process, which led to use two air frequencies between channels 8 and 10.

In 1979, Televisión Educativa has the support of the Government, it is affected by the coup d'état of President General Humberto Romero. The most palpable consequence of the act was the change of governmental authorities and consequently changes in the arrival of new directors in the projects of the institution. In the 80s, educational television is affected by the war that the country is experiencing at that time. It causes expenses and repairs of television equipment and apparatus. During the same period the television operating system appears. It offers, then, a positive aspect to technology, but with the unfavorable factor that the economy of that time was no benefit.

The Television Information System (STI) consists of recording live and airing. In this way, Educative Television was in charge of training the personnel for the management of the system. However, there were always problems due to lack of equipment, inadequate budget and poor maintenance of equipment. In 1986, Televisión Educativa becomes part of the Ministry of Culture and Communications as Directorate of Educational Cultural Television. But it is known as National Television, a situation that it maintains until 1989. Unfortunately, the problem of the lack of resources and money to maintain the equipment, as well as few financial incentives for the staff, was always maintained. Gradually other types of problems arose, such as the lack of adequate programming to cover two channels and Channel 8 becomes a channel 10 repeater.

In 1989, there is a signal problem and Channel 8 loses it and stops transmitting. It is never repaired and continues in line with a signal that does not reach all of Salvadoran territory. It is at that moment that the role of Cultural and Educational Television in this country was rethought, creating a logo that identifies it. This gives it a new personality, more national programs are produced and Cultural Educational Television becomes part of the Ministry of Education under the charge of Dr. René Hernández Valiente.

=== Channel 10: The Television Channel of El Salvador ===
In 1990, the National Television returns to the Ministry of Education as a unit of Educational Cultural Television Direction but it is known as Educational Cultural Television. Its objective is to design, produce and disseminate programs aimed at rescuing Salvadoran values and traditions, promoting culture and permanent education in the areas of moral, civic, health, labor education, formal education, environment and others. There are also changes in the area of transmission and content of the programs, derived from chaos and decay, as it begins to transmit programs sent by other countries. International aid and the transmission of educational programs cause chaos within the institution, because there were no compatible computers with the formats they sent. To this is added the lack of personnel, among others. Little by little these factors were influencing so that programming was minimal and more national programs were transmitted, becoming more cultural.

Channel 10 has made significant changes. As of January 3, 2007, it is called Canal 10 Educational and Cultural Television, and at the same time premieres a new image that represents the state television station but under the control of MINED. Between 1991 and 2006, it was in the hands of the National Council for Culture and Art (CONCULTURA). Before 2006, the institution was known as Educational Cultural Television, known for its academic programming. This last change is added to the six transformations that the image of the channel has suffered to date, replacing the one that was maintained during the 15 years. With the current change, Channel 10 announces and clarifies the hybrid nature that it will have as "Educational and Cultural Television" focusing on family and educational entertainment. These changes demonstrate its evolution, which is developing little by little, at a sure pace. Later, Channel 10 is named as "Television of El Salvador" as well as its initials TVES, which remains an educational channel. On December 21, 2018, TVES operated transmissions for the first time on digital television in El Salvador. And finally the present day, that in 2020 was called Canal 10 "again" with initials C10 a new logo was presented that day.

== Logos ==
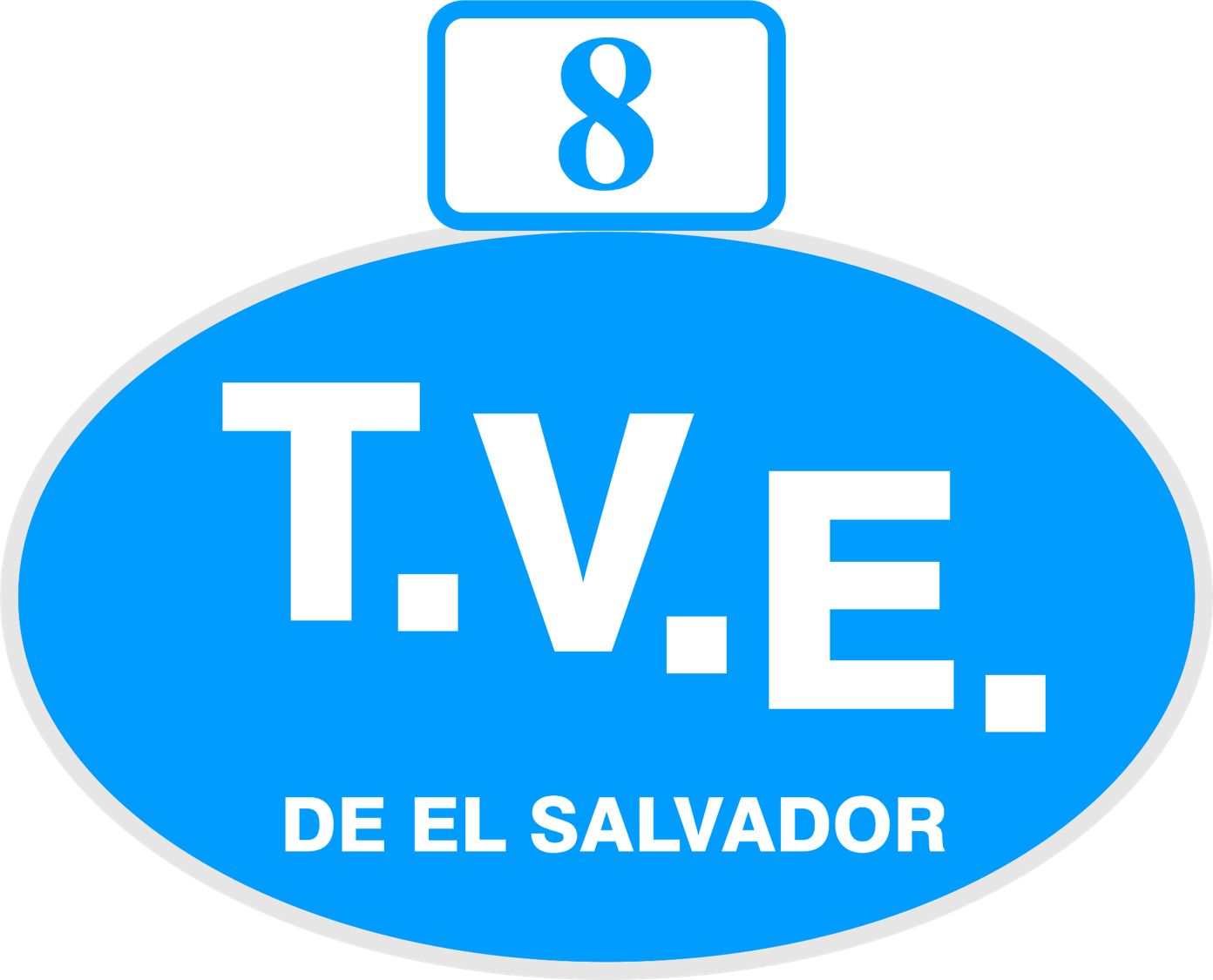
Used from 1964 to 1982 from Channel 8.

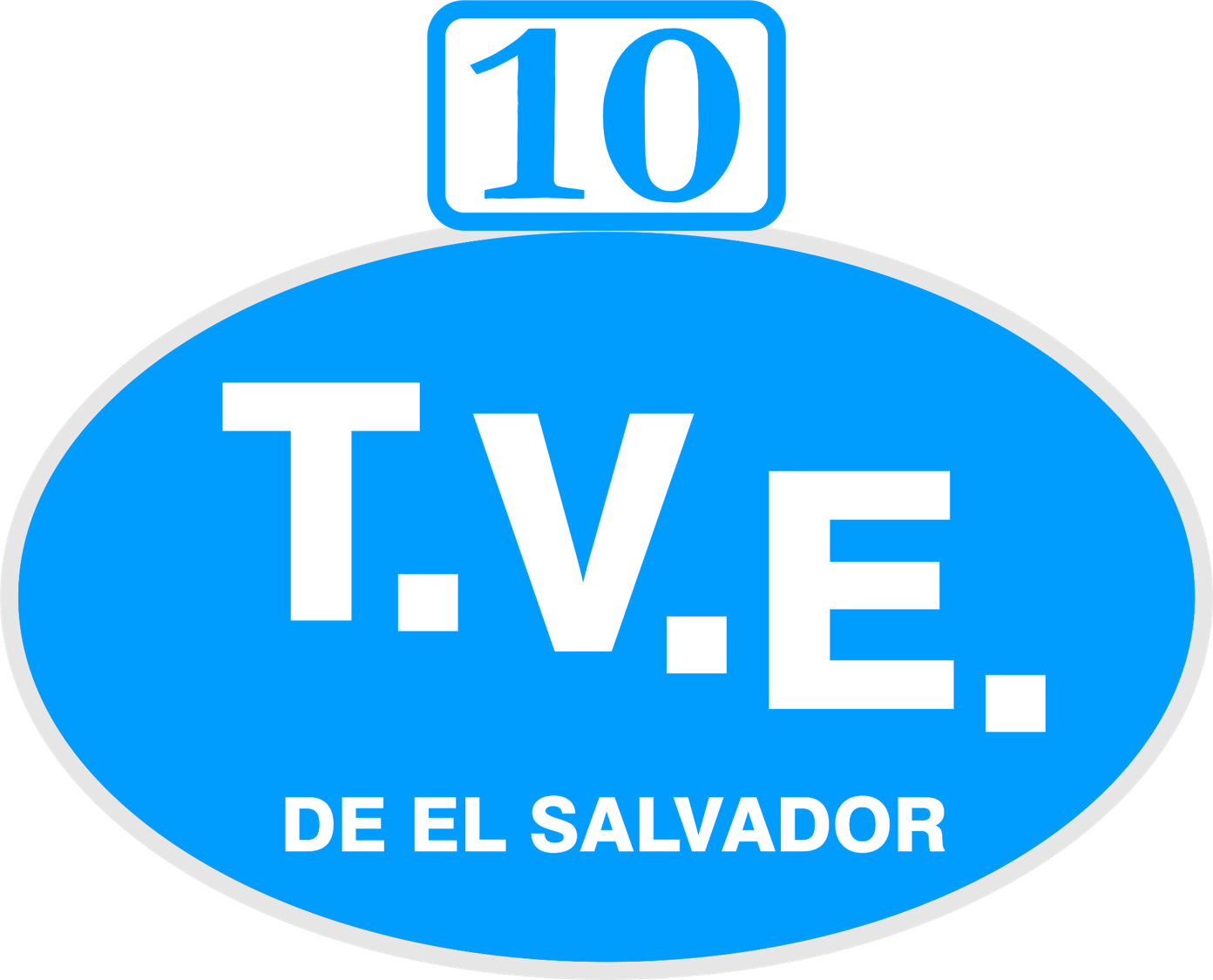
Used from 1964 to 1985 from Channel 10.

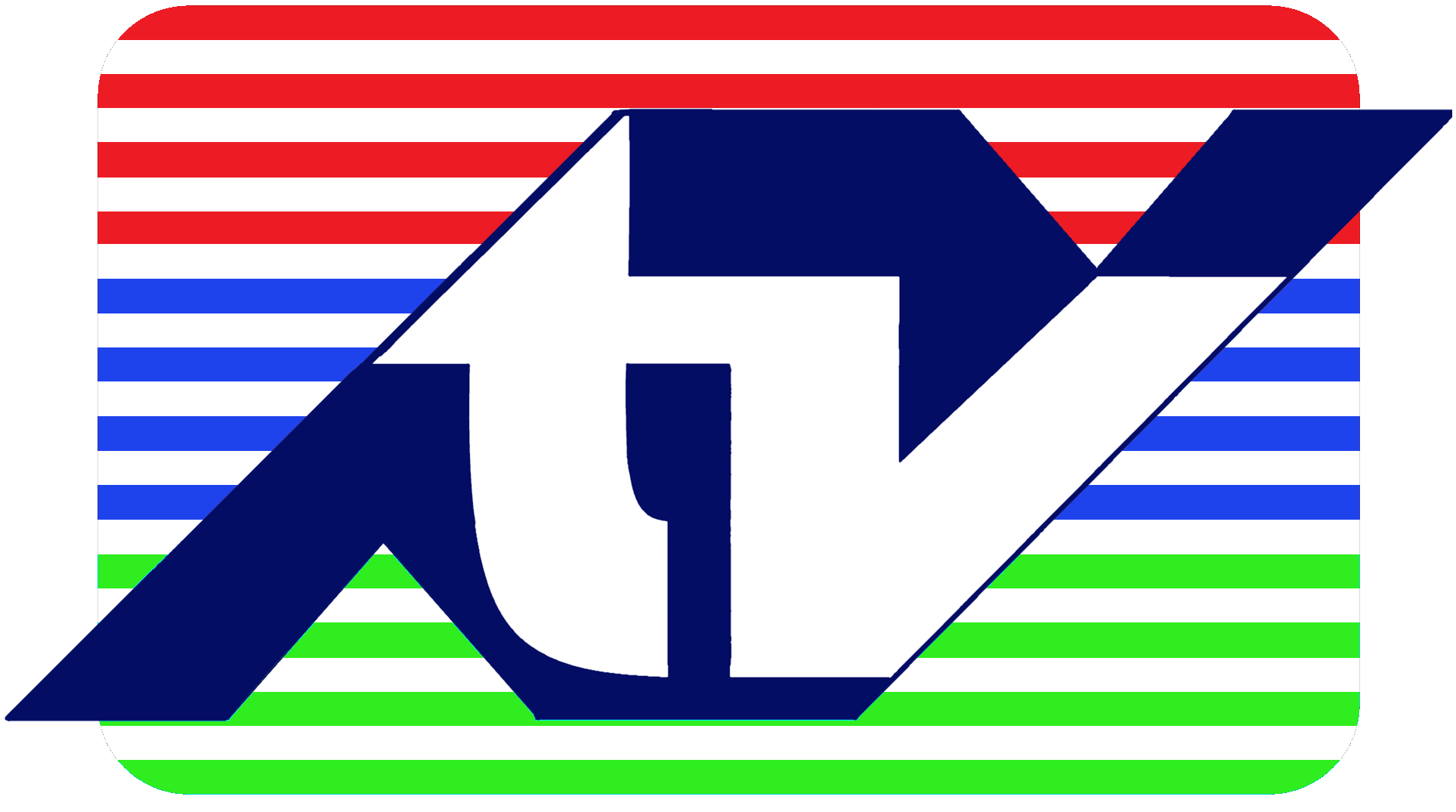
Used from 1985 to 1990

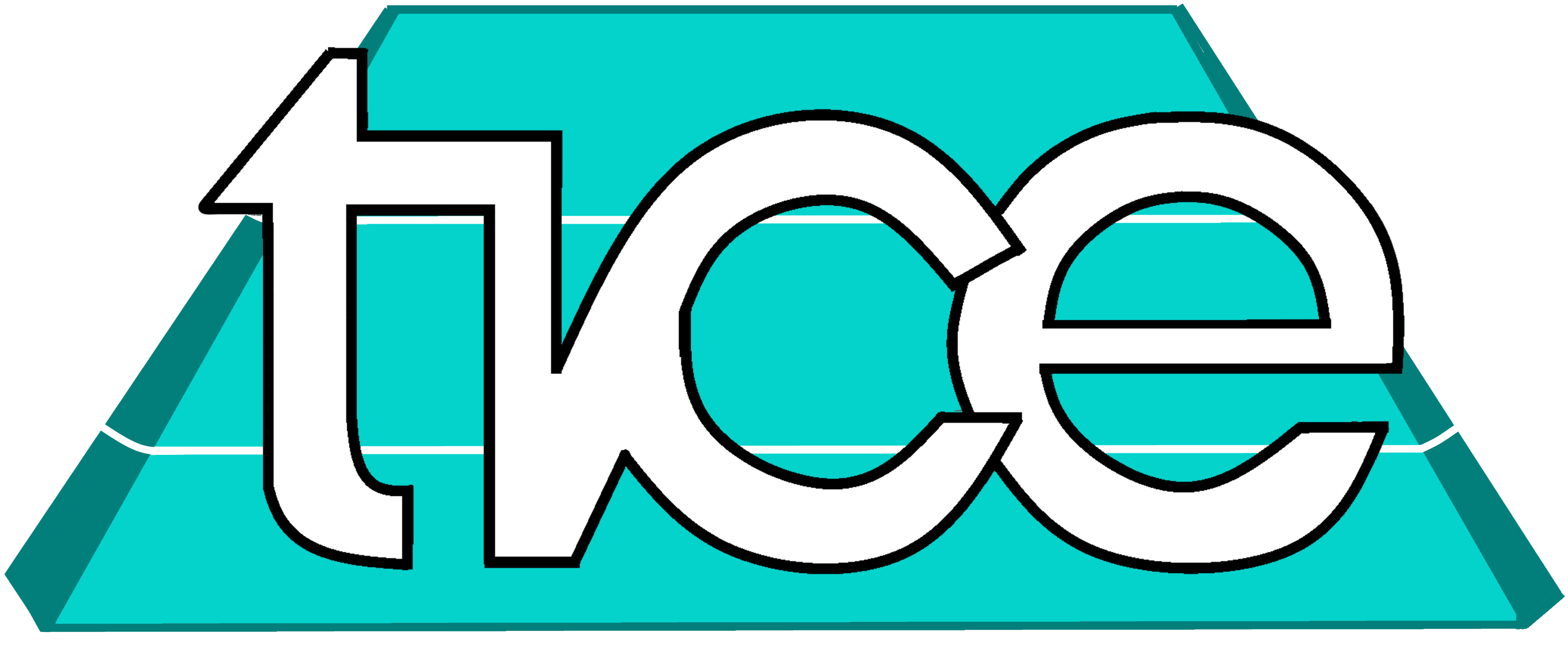
Used from 1990 to 1993.

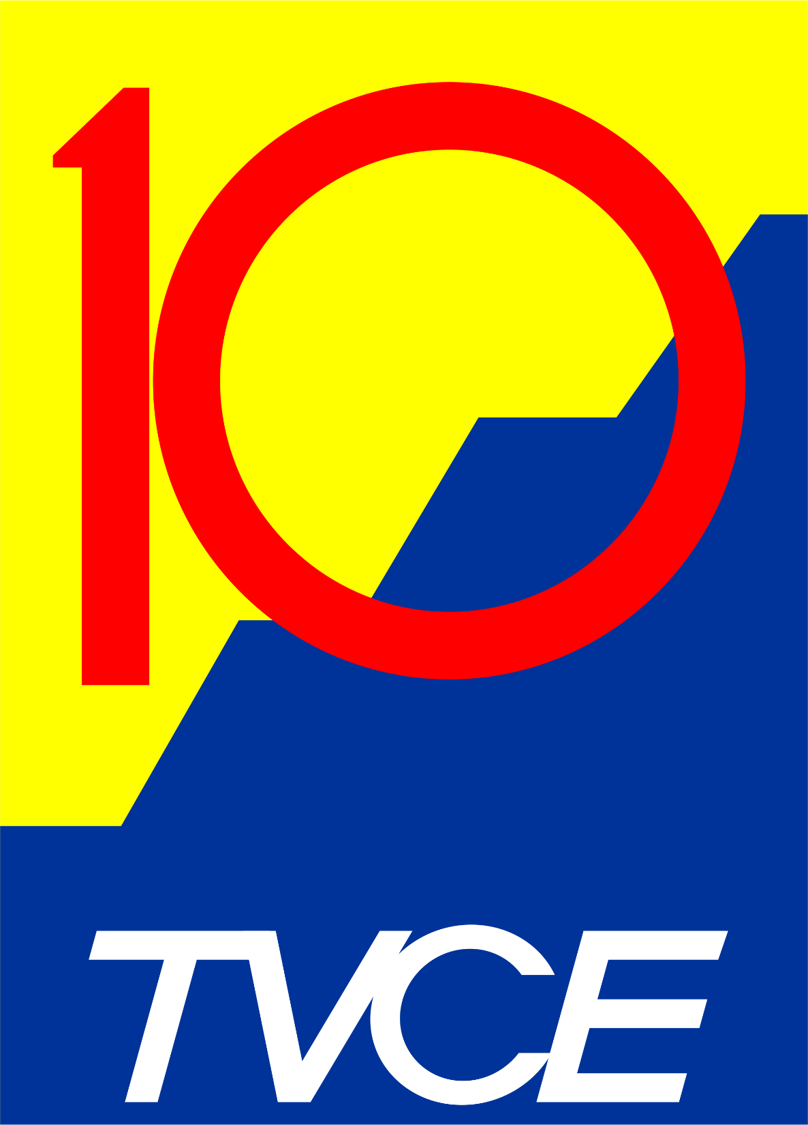
Used from 1993 to 1996.

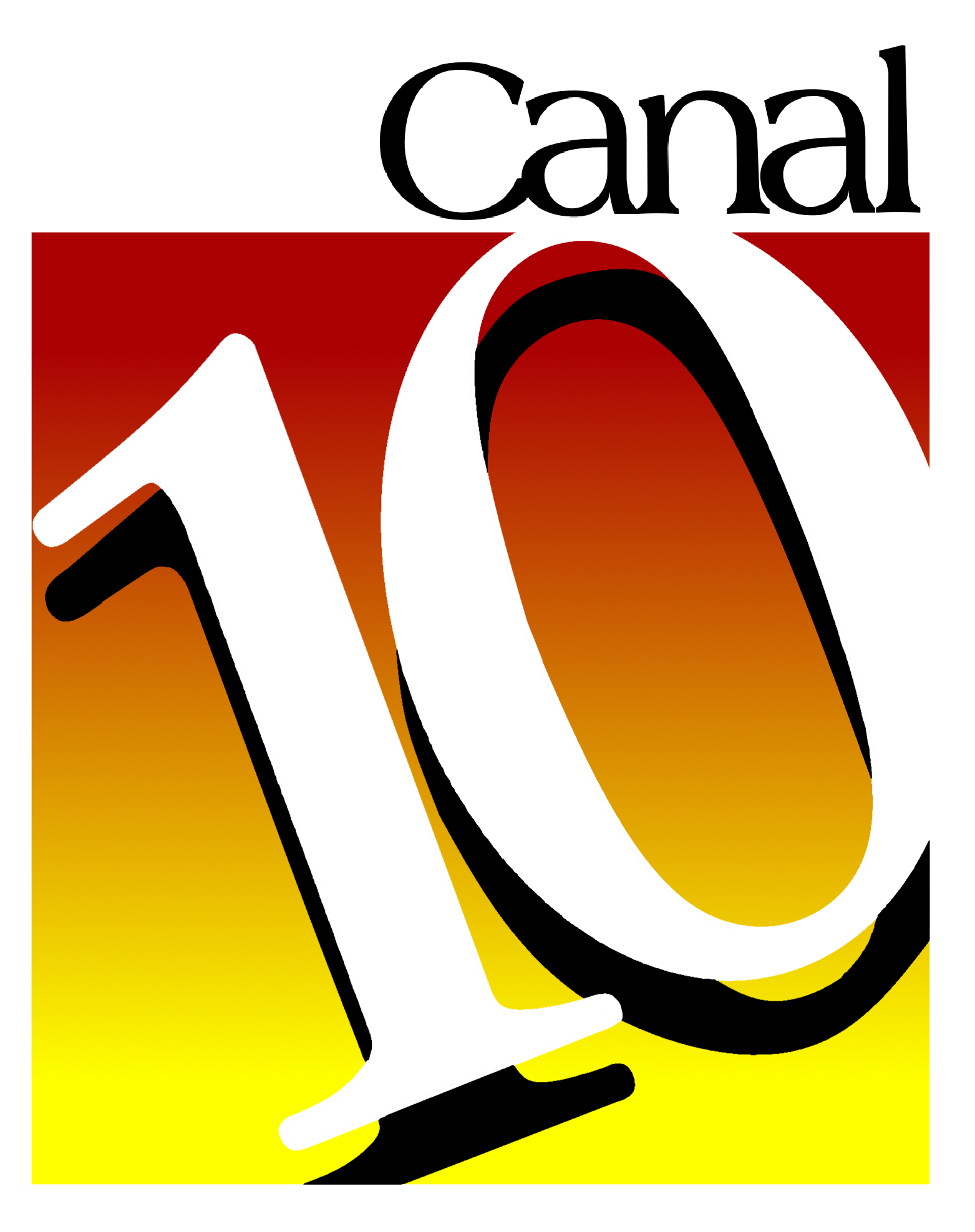
Used from 1996 to 2003.

Used from 2003 to 2007.

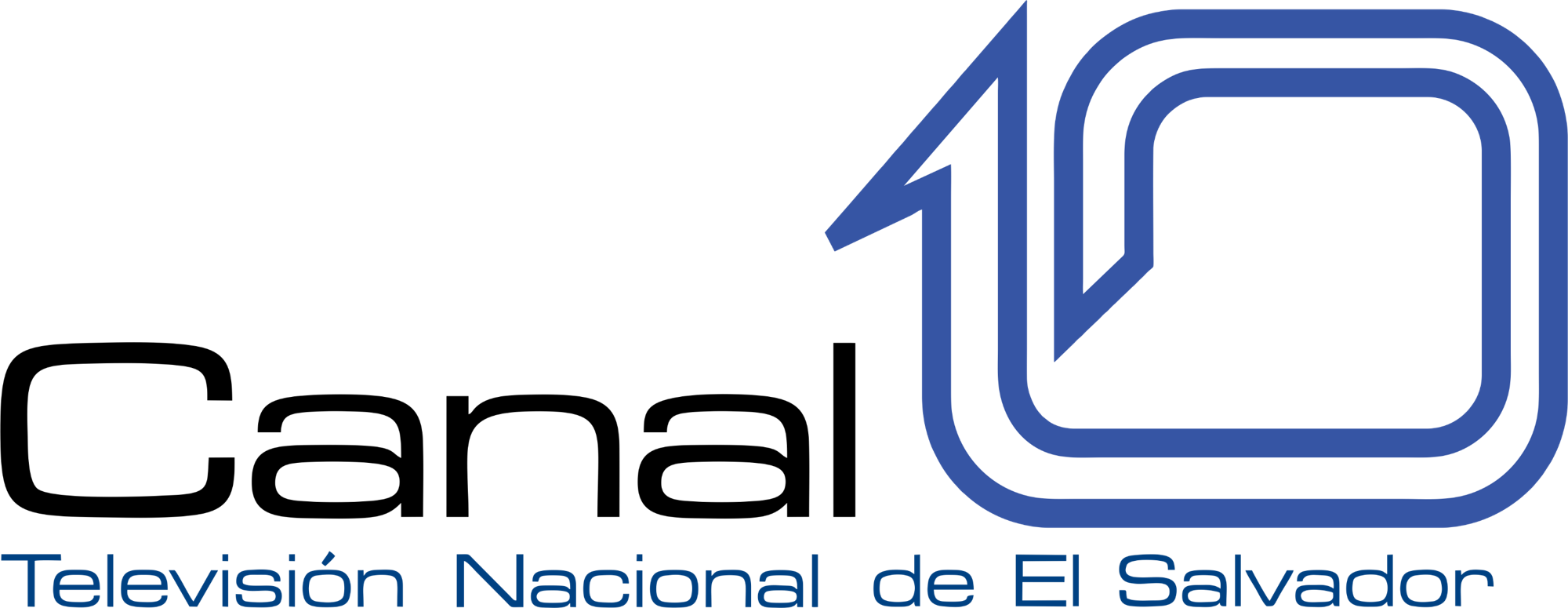
Used from 2007 to 2011.

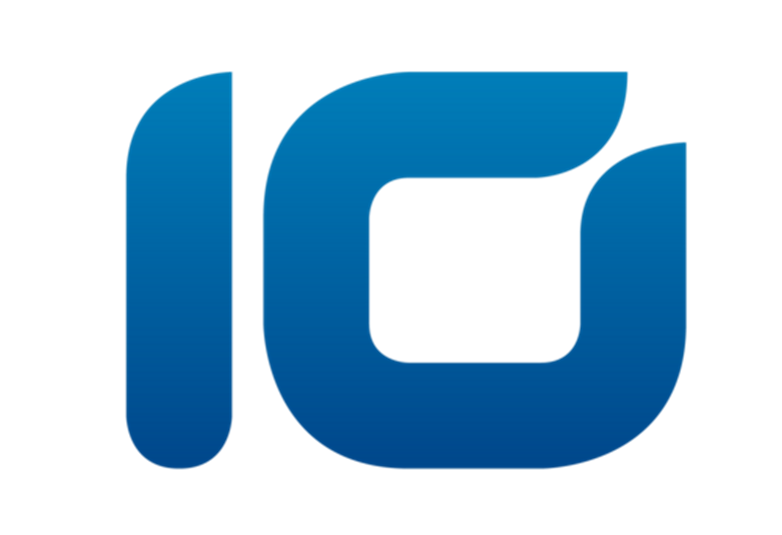
Used from 2011 to 2013.

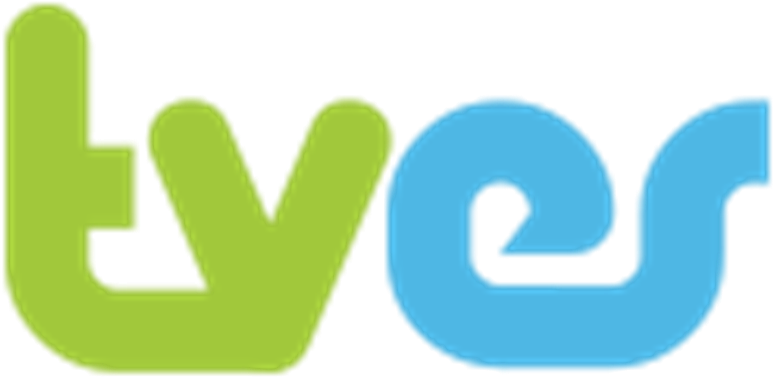
Used from 2013 to 2020.

Current since 2020.
