= Teleamazonas =

Ecuadorian television network

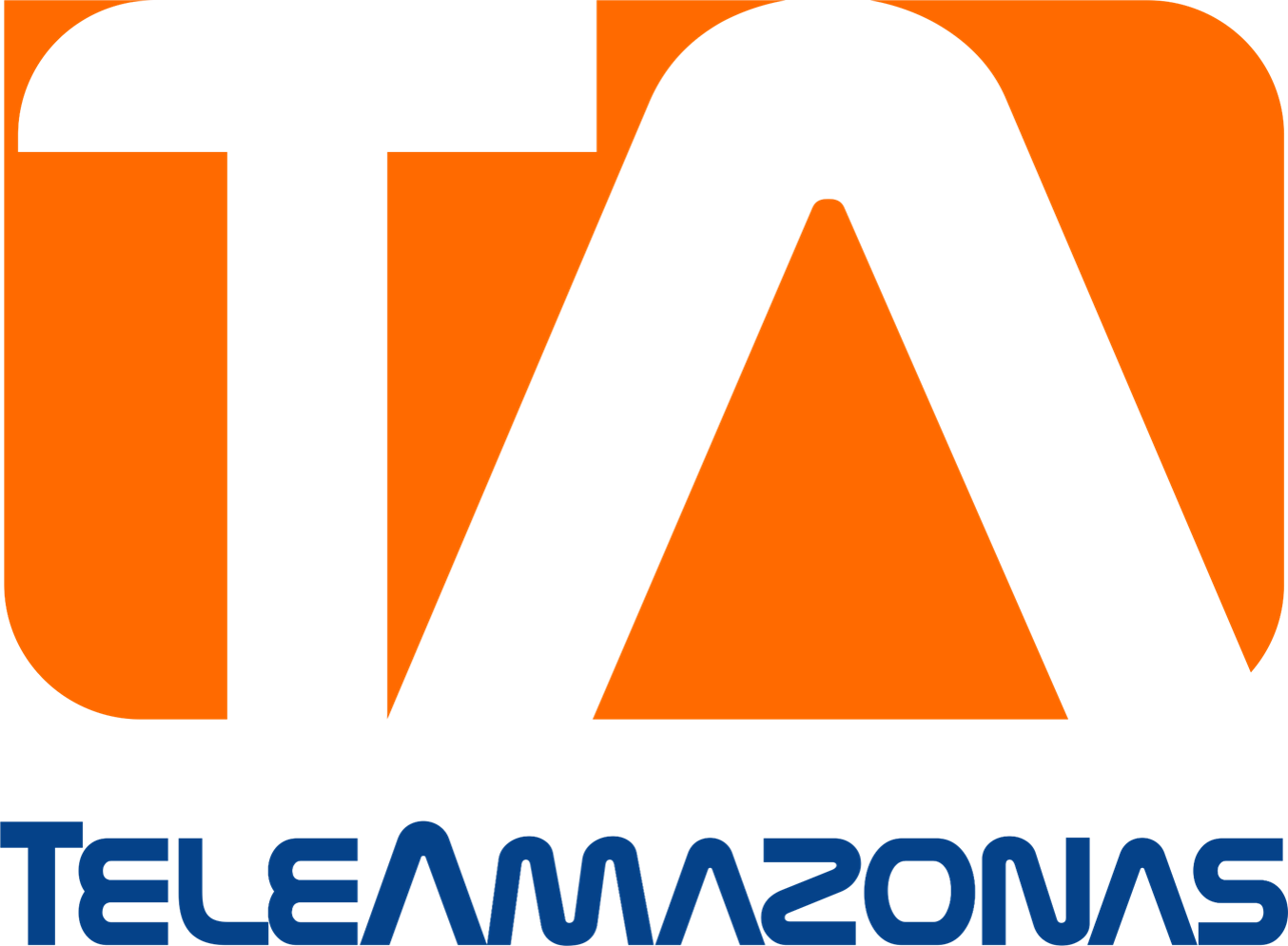
- Type: Free-to-air television network
- Country: Ecuador
- Headquarters: Quito

Programming
- Language: Spanish
- Picture format: 1080i HDTV

Ownership
- Owner: Grupo Teleamazonas

History
- Launched: 22 February 1974; 52 years ago

Links
- Website: www.teleamazonas.com

Availability

Terrestrial
- Analog VHF: Channel 4 (Quito); Channel 5 (Guayaquil)
- Digital VHF: Channel 4.1 (Quito); Channel 5.1 (Guayaquil)

Teleamazonas is an Ecuadorian television network that was launched on 22 February 1974. It is one of the major television networks in the country. It was founded by Antonio Granda Centeno and has two feeds: one produced in Quito and broadcast in the rest of the country, and the other one produced in and available in Guayaquil and Guayas.

== History ==
Teleamazonas was created from the sale of frequencies that belonged to HCJB-TV, owned by the HCJB radio ministry, in April 1972, to Antonio Granda Centeno. The color equipment used arrived in February 1973, becoming the first network to broadcast in color when launched. Experimental color broadcasts started on November 5, 1973 under the new owner and began regular broadcasts on February 22, 1974, as the first network with color television transmissions in Ecuador, positioning itself as the fourth country in Latin America, behind Brazil, the Dominican Republic and Mexico, to introduce the technology. Its headquarters and main studios are located in Quito. Teleamazonas got the most powerful microwave radio relay, acquired the first mobile television unit, and built in Guayaquil the biggest self-supported antenna. From the start, it was the first ever color TV station in Spanish-speaking Latin America, a move that would inspire its neighboring countries to make the switch to color TV. Its signals were also received in border areas of Peru.

In addition, the network made history as Ecuador's first true national network - while the Quito station had been opened during its first weeks, plans were underway to build a number of transmitter towers to relay programming to the provinces as well as to Guayaquil in the south as well as dedicated studios for regional news bureaus. In 1978, the station was shut down for a week during the government of Guillermo Rodríguez Lara, following controversial comments in its newscast, 24 Horas. Diego Oquendo was its director, having arrived due to the network's connections with the El Tiempo newspaper (which Antonio Granda Centeno also owned), becoming a national figure. Since the beginning, Teleamazonas was the most technologically advanced network in Ecuador. By 1976, it aimed to enter the city of Cuenca by using channel 3, which was occupied by Canal 3 Ciudad de Cuenca; an agreement was settled between the two parties in 1979 enabling the local station to broadcast on channel 2 and the Teleamazonas relay on channel 11. The first mobile unit was installed in 1981, enabling the station to broadcast soccer matches and bullfighting events. In 1984, the network created Ecuador's first television miniseries, El teniente Parodi.

On November 6, 1988, during a soccer match, it was announced that Teleamazonas' founder, Granda Centeno, died in the United States. All programming was suspended for three days and his shares and assets were put in hands of his sons and heirs. On August 12, 1996, the network started airing Nada personal, TV Azteca's first breakout hit, competing against Marisol and a Brazilian telenovela on other networks. Before its premiere in Ecuador, the channel aired a special program describing its plot, footage from its recording and interviews. The series ended up becoming a smash hit for Teleamazonas, which even made car sweepstakes and US$20,000 in prizes, and becoming the most-watched telenovela in its first week on air.

In September 1998, it received support from Itelco, sponsored by state company Petroproducción, where ten transmitters were connected by means of thirteen microwave hops, in the country's southwestern region, including the border with Peru.

Founded by Antonio Granda Centeno, the channel was under control of his family until 2001, when Eduardo Granda Garcés paid a high debt to Banco del Pichincha. Fidel Egas Grijalva, major shareholder of the bank, took charge of Teleamazonas. The managing position was taken over by Sebastián Corral in 2002.

On November 19, 2003, it gained an output deal with Buena Vista International Television, to gain access to its catalog of series and movies. The contract encompassed its animated series (House of Mouse, 101 Dalmatians, Timon & Pumba, The Legend of Tarzan), those acquired from Saban from Disney's takeover of Fox Family Worldwide (Spiderman, Hulk, Power Rangers), live-action series (8 Simple Rules, Boy Meets World, Honey, I Shrunk the Kids) and movies from its ensemble of labels (102 Dalmatians, Chocolat, Unbreakable, The Wedding Planner, Spy Kids, Remember the Titans, The Kid, Cider House Rules). Between 2002 and 2005, Teleamazonas had invested US$8 million in technology, and was set to buy its own equipment for the unified La Tri network for the 2006 FIFA World Cup (with Ecuavisa and RTS). The network was set to invest US$1.2 million in equipment in 2006 alone, including the combined World Cup network.

During the presidency of Rafael Correa, the network, particularly its flagship opinion maker and pundit Jorge Ortiz, has found itself at odds with the government, which accuses it of manipulating public opinion to suite the interests of the companies and shareholders who provide the capital for Teleamazonas such as the Banco del Pichincha. Several proceedings have taken place against Teleamazonas, culminating on December 22, 2009, when the network was ordered a 72-hour shutdown. At closing time (5:08pm), the channel was airing an episode of Malcolm in the Middle, while the staff in Quito was facing an uncertain situation. Manager Sebastián Corral called the measure "illegal". During the 72-hour period, programming continued on Teleamazonas Internacional and the channel's website. Upon returning to the air, the network aired a message aimed at its viewers. This government move immediately prompted a backlash from advocacy groups who claimed to be acting in the interests of freedom of expression. In his presidency, new television channel unions were created, where it and Ecuavisa were notable absentees.

In September 2010, Fidel Egas, banned from owning media outlets in Ecuador, sold his shares on Teleamazonas to several groups: 30% to the Peruvian media group La República, 48% to a group of Teleamazonas employees and 22% to a group of Fidel Egas' personal friends. Teleamazonas' sale was the result of the mandate of the Ecuadorian Constitution of 2008, which provides that no person may simultaneously hold shares in banks and media. Egas appealed his decision on May 19, 2016, having questioned the decision when the president talked about the issue two days prior. Later that year, the president attacked the network again, claiming it to be part of "one of the country's largest and most closed monopolies".

The station announced a relocation of its headquarters to a new location in September 2021, in northern Quito. The new building was first conceived in August 2019.

The network and Xtrim started sharing rights to the local football league in 2024. No concrete information about the sublicensing to Teleamazonas was given in public.

== Programming ==
In its earlier decades, Teleamazonas has produced important national series and films like "Sucre", "En un rincón del alma", "Recuerdos en Paita", "El Gran Retorno", "J. J., El Ruiseñor de América", among others. The channel also airs dramas (including K-dramas), films as well as anime shows like Doraemon. (both modern and classic versions), and Yo soy Betty, la fea, one of Colombia's most popular romantic telenovelas.

From 1973 to 1993, it carried Telejardín, one of the more remembered national kids' shows.

An agreement to carry several Nickelodeon series was signed in 2017.

In 2019, Teleamazonas joined forces with Endemol Shine Group to create the first ever Ecuadorian version of MasterChef.

In March 2022, it gained the rights to air the 2022 FIFA World Cup. The network aired 32 matches live (including all matches with Ecuador's national team) and 32 matches delayed.

In September 2024, it gained the rights to Chespirito's comedies, coinciding with the negotiations to re-enable broadcasting of the series on linear TV and streaming platforms. That year, it also premiered an Ecuadorian version of Ahora caigo, using studios provided by Canal 4 in Montevideo.

== Administrative issues ==
Since May 2009, the channel has been facing problems, due to four administrative issues against Teleamazonas issued by Consejo Nacional de Radio y Televisión (CONARTEL) under the grounds that it was infracting the Broadcasting Law.

The four situations were:

- Having aired, in a report, images of the Bullfighting Fair of Ambato 2009. This happened in the 24 Horas news program. Since November 18, 2008, by resolution of CONARTEL, the broadcast of images and advertising in which "evidence scenes of violence and express cruelty against animals and/or people, with respect to events related to the so-called "bullfights" or "bullfighting fairs" at the national level were prohibited."
- Broadcasting live the alleged discovery, by politicians from the Madera de Guerrero Movement, of a "Clandestine Computer Center" in Guayaquil, where according to these politicians electoral data was processed and electoral fraud could occur. This was later denied and clarified by the National Electoral Council. According to CONARTEL, Teleamazonas would have transmitted an "alleged" event that violates literal "e" of article 58 of the Radio and Television Law.
- Presenting, in its newscast, a report about the work of the Venezuelan oil company PDVSA in Puná Island as well as the statements of the residents. The report talked about the impact that would be produced by PDVSA's gas exploration work, which caused the residents of Puná Island to take over the Oil Company's facilities. In this way, concern about possible mass hysteria on the part of the residents was the reason for the process.
- Disseminating, during an interview by journalist Jorge Ortiz, a "clandestine recording", where Fernando Balda, affiliated with the PSP, denounced the alleged modifications to the text of the Constitution prepared in Montecristi and involving the head of State, Rafael Correa.

=== Sanctions ===
- The first process has already been judged and sanctioned with a fine of 20 USD.
- The second process ended in a fine of 40 USD. Both this sanction and the previous one were declared "without legal value" in a ruling by the District Court of Administrative Litigation of Pichincha in March 2010.
- The third process was sanctioned by the Superintendency of Telecommunications on December 22, 2009 at 5:09 p.m., ordering the closure of the station for 72 hours. which sparked protests at the channel's facilities by its employees in the cities of Quito and Guayaquil. This closure was appealed and on February 3, 2010, in a final ruling, the First Chamber of the Provincial Court of Pichincha ruled that the closure "violated constitutional procedures" and ordered that damages be paid to the station. The court ruling was harshly criticized by President Rafael Correa. A few days after the sanction, in what was seen as retaliation to the judges who issued the verdict, they were fined for alleged irregularities in a different process.
- After the Organic Law for Media was approved in Ecuador, in 2014, several social organizations of Afro-Ecuadorians, indigenous people, Montubios, women, homosexuals, among others, led by the trans activist Diane Rodríguez, filed a legal complaint against the media. The reason was due to a sketch of the comedy program La pareja feliz which was considered discriminatory due to its content. The Ombudsman's Office of Ecuador became the supervisory body for the complaint filed, and later the Superintendence of Information and Communication (Supercom) prepared an evidentiary technical report. On October 6, 2014, this litigation chapter against the media and comedy corporation of Ecuador closed, establishing a legal precedent in favor of the homosexual community. The report of the Council for the Regulation and Development of Information and Communication (Cordicom) established a resolution in which it indicates that the homosexual community was discriminated against for reasons of sexual orientation, thus allowing the Superintendence of Information and Communication (Supercom) to issue the final ruling.

== Other controversies ==
In June 2009, CONARTEL warned Teleamazonas of airing The Simpsons during safe harbor slots, under the grounds of being an adult animated series, which would only air between 9pm and 6am. The restrictions were later appealed. In November 2015, a similar situation happened when CONARTEL adverted Teleamazonas to restrict its airings of the series (at 1pm and 7pm) to slots between 9pm and 6am, with the same rationale. The ruling only affected terrestrial television.

In 2015, the airing of WWE programs on the channel outside of the safe harbor led to Teleamazonas paying a fine of US$1,770. Supercom official Carlos Ochoa said that the programs would have a negative influence on children, who would imitate the violent acts.
