= Televicentro (Ecuador) =

TVC
- Country: Ecuador
- Broadcast area: Ecuador

Programming
- Picture format: 1080i HDTV

Ownership
- Owner: Grupo El Comercio (Albavisión)

History
- Launched: August 7, 1984; February 1, 2016 (relaunch)
- Replaced: RTS (relay)
- Former names: Maxivisión (1991-1993); Televicentro (2016-)

Links
- Website: www.tvc.com.ec

Availability

Terrestrial
- Digital VHF: Channel 5.1 (Quito); Channel 11.1 (Guayaquil)

TVC, formerly Televicentro, is an Ecuadorian television channel owned by Grupo El Comercio, itself owned by Remigio Ángel González's Albavisión conglomerate. The channel has existed in its current form since 2016, when González acquired two frequencies without prior government oversight. Its history, however, dates back to 1984, when it operated separately from Channel 4 in Guayaquil.

== History ==
Ortel was founded in early 1984, and its broadcasts on VHF channel 5 started in August of that year. In 1991, the channel was acquired by Remigio Ángel González, who had owned Telesistema (channel 4) in Guayaquil since at least 1983. Under his management, the channel was renamed Maxivisión. The company merged with Telecuatro Guayaquil in 1993, effectively ceasing local origination of content, becoming a relayer of Telesistema.

Ortel continued to exist as a separate company. Thanks to revisions in the Ecuadorian media law in 1997, Telecuatro and Ortel were acquired by Panamanian company Prolasa (de facto predecessor of Albavisión) and Belleville Investment, a companyseated in the Bahamas, a tax haven. González is the head figure of both companies.

El Comercio was acquired by the group on December 30, 2014, by means of Teglovisión, a company owned by González's nephew. On August 4, 2015, Arcotel assigned two new VHF frequencies for Quito and Guayaquil, both on channel 11. These frequencies would be instrumental for Televicentro to begin its operations.

The channel launched almost without prior warning on February 1, 2016, on channel 5 in Quito (displacing RTS to channel 11) and channel 11 in Guayaquil. Early on, on February 3, journalist Andrés Carrión left the channel after receiving a warning from "hidden forces" and criticism from Rafael Correa. Carrión later moved to Canal Uno.

It was also suggested that the launch of Televicentro was due to "technological testing".
