= Ecuavisa =

Ecuadorian television network

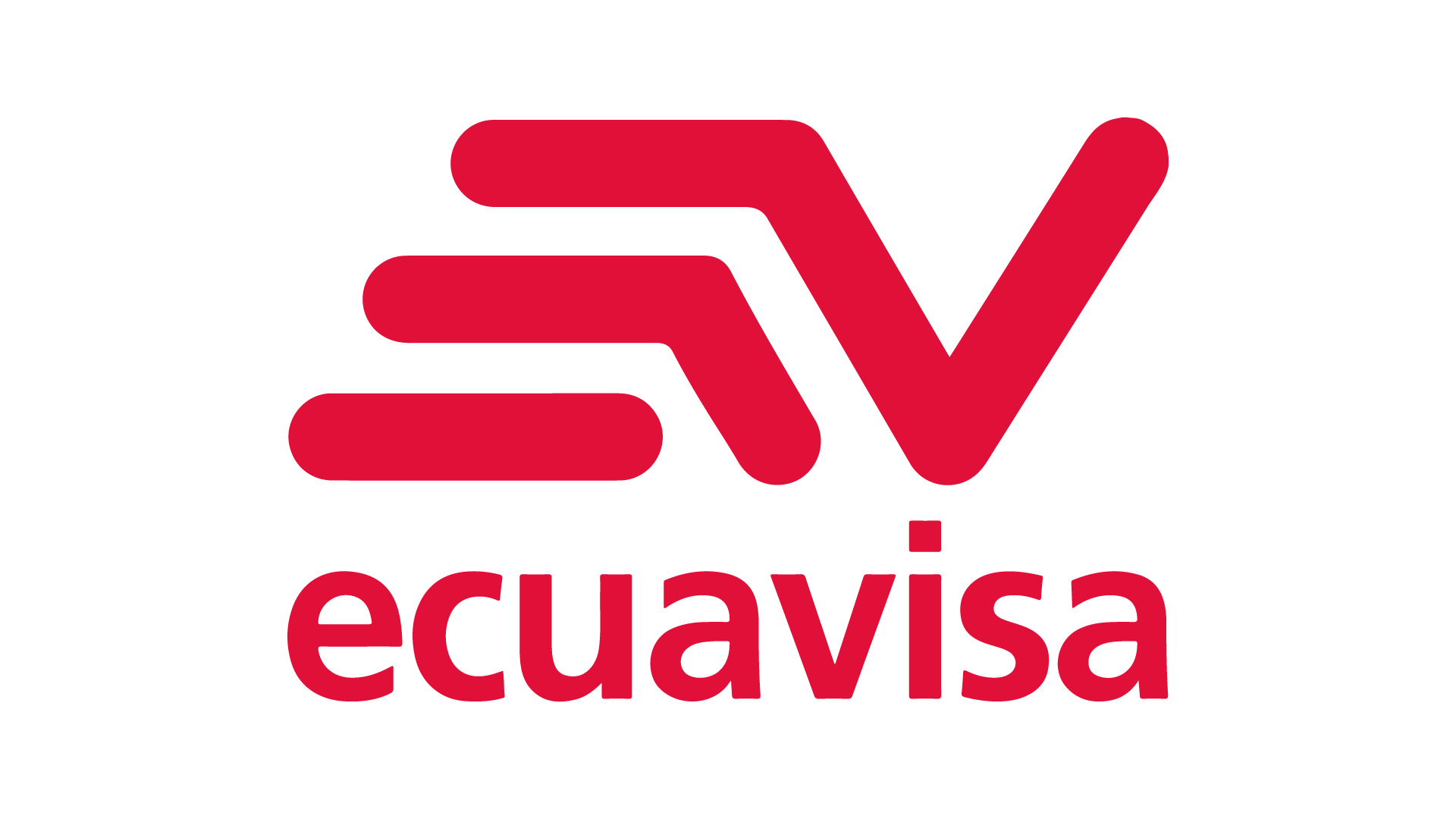
- Type: Free-to-air television network
- Country: Ecuador
- Broadcast area: Ecuador

Programming
- Language: Spanish
- Picture format: 1080i HDTV

Ownership
- Owner: Grupo Alvarado Roca

History
- Launched: March 1, 1967; 59 years ago
- Founder: Xavier Alvarado Roca

Links
- Website: ecuavisa.com

Availability

Terrestrial
- Analog VHF: Channel 8 (Quito); Channel 2 (Guayaquil)
- Digital VHF: Channel 8.1 (Quito); Channel 2.1 (Guayaquil)

Ecuavisa is an Ecuadorian free-to-air television network that was launched on March 1, 1967, on Quito's channel 8 and Guayaquil's channel 2. It is one of the leading TV networks in the country. The channel has an international feed named Ecuavisa Internacional.

== History ==
The foundations of the main station that would lead to the creation of the current network were laid on August 22, 1966, atop Cerro del Carmen, Guayaquil, inspired by the philosophy of the Vistazo magazine. In record time, the building was finished (in four months), as well as the assemblage of the equipment needed for the station (in two months), provided by RCA and General Electric.

Ecuavisa was founded by Xavier Alvarado Roca and began to broadcast on March 1, 1967. The network began broadcasting from Guayaquil and was originally known as Canal 2. The channel received support from Miami's WCKT, owned by Sydney Ansin.

Initially the station only covered Guayaquil on channel 2, but there were plans to start a separate station in Quito on channel 8. On June 21, 1970, Ecuavisa started broadcasting to Quito and the two stations adopted the name Cadena de Unión Nacional (National Unity Network). Color broadcasts of the Quito station started in 1973 at the time of its third anniversary in June, with the airing of Televisa's telenovela Mi rival and an edition of the British variety show The Julie Andrews Hour.

In the 1970s, Ecuavisa was able to increase its audience share by premiering new programming and starting broadcasting partnerships with regional providers. Ecuavisa also benefited from the advent of color television in the decade, competing with the then rising Teleamazonas in this regard as the country's second color broadcaster.

The two stations (Quito and Guayaquil) signed an agreement to create the Ecuavisa consortium in 1978, in order to consolidate efforts between the two stations and increase their reach. The original consortium was disbanded in 1981, but was revived the following year by means of an agreement between the two stations, to share their resources for both editions of Televistazo.

Many Ecuadorian celebrities participated in Ecuavisa's shows throughout the 1980s and 1990s. During these two decades, the network aired some of Ecuador's top television shows.

In 1994, Ecuavisa started broadcasting a wireless subscription television operator over UHF, Univisa, which was renamed from the initial name Simón Cable sin Cable on November 1, 1994. Univisa used MMDS technology.

On June 11, 1998, it signed an agreement with The Weather Channel to supply weather segments for its morning and late evening newscasts. The following year, it announced an agreement with MGM Networks to use its studios for Recetas para el alma, a new age program, airing on both Ecuavisa and Casa Club TV. Ricardo Alarcón, formerly of Caracol Televisión, was appointed general manager of Ecuavisa in June 2002.

In 2004, Ecuavisa launched Ecuavisa Internacional, its international feed. The channel is broadcast in the United States on DirecTV and Verizon Fios. In Spain and Latin America, Ecuavisa Internacional is also broadcast as a free-to-air channel on Hispasat satellite.

On May 9, 2013, Ecuavisa launched its own high-definition feed.

== Programming ==
Ecuavisa dedicates a great portion of its programming to international shows, mainly soap operas from Televisa, Telemundo, TV Globo and ABS-CBN, such as Rubí, El clon, Avenida Brasil and Kadenang Ginto.

Ecuavisa's programming is oriented to family entertainment, educational programs, and soap operas (novelas). In 2007, Ecuavisa is boosting its own productions, with "El hombre de la casa" (a remake of Man about the House) a classic British comedy. Other remakes made are La niñera (The Nanny) and "Kliffor" (a remake of The Cosby Show), that achieved great success in Ecuador's ratings profile.

Ecuavisa has a nightly news broadcast, Televistazo, which is currently the most watched news show in Ecuador. For years, it also aired programming for children, such as Dragon Ball and Doraemon (which at the time of its premiere in 2002 had good share) from Japan. Non-anime series for children included Zooboomafoo, Little Robots, Sesame Street and Foster's Home for Imaginary Friends.

In 2015, Ecuavisa came under fire for replacing reruns of Dragon Ball with the local version of Chilean competition show Yingo. This resulted in a mass protest from viewers and a change to the program's timeslot.

== Bombing ==
In March 2023, journalists and presenters were targeted in an attack on media personalities. Several journalists received envelopes containing a USB stick. Once the device was plugged into a computer, it would explode.

One of Ecuavisa's television presenters, Lenin Artieda received minor injuries from the blast after one of the devices were plugged into a computer in the newsroom in Guayaquil.
