= Lists of television stations in North America =

== Canada ==
According to the CRTC, there are 18 UHF public television networks, 11 VHF public television networks, 19 UHF commercial television networks, 43 VHF commercial television networks, 22 UHF system television networks, and 5 VHF system television networks. These lists only cover broadcast stations.

- List of television stations in Alberta
- List of television stations in British Columbia
- List of television stations in Manitoba
- List of television stations in New Brunswick
- List of television stations in Newfoundland and Labrador
- List of television stations in Northwest Territories
- List of television stations in Nova Scotia
- List of television stations in Nunavut
- List of television stations in Ontario
- List of television stations in Prince Edward Island
- List of television stations in Quebec
- List of television stations in Saskatchewan
- List of television stations in Yukon

== United States ==
According to the FCC, as of June 30, 2026, there are 1,041 UHF commercial television stations, 349 VHF commercial television stations, 270 UHF educational television stations and 117 VHF educational television stations, plus 362 Class A UHF television stations, 35 Class A VHF television stations, 2,442 UHF television translators, 626 VHF television translators, 1,485 UHF low-power television stations and 287 VHF low-power television stations. These lists only cover broadcast stations.

There are also many amateur television stations throughout the entire world.

- List of television stations in Alabama
- List of television stations in Alaska
- List of television stations in Arizona
- List of television stations in Arkansas
- List of television stations in California
- List of television stations in Colorado
- List of television stations in Connecticut
- List of television stations in Delaware
- List of television stations in Florida
- List of television stations in Georgia
- List of television stations in Hawaii
- List of television stations in Idaho
- List of television stations in Illinois
- List of television stations in Indiana
- List of television stations in Iowa
- List of television stations in Kansas
- List of television stations in Kentucky
- List of television stations in Louisiana
- List of television stations in Maine
- List of television stations in Maryland
- List of television stations in Massachusetts
- List of television stations in Michigan
- List of television stations in Minnesota
- List of television stations in Mississippi
- List of television stations in Missouri
- List of television stations in Montana
- List of television stations in Nebraska
- List of television stations in Nevada
- List of television stations in New Hampshire
- List of television stations in New Jersey
- List of television stations in New Mexico
- List of television stations in New York
- List of television stations in North Carolina
- List of television stations in North Dakota
- List of television stations in Ohio
- List of television stations in Oklahoma
- List of television stations in Oregon
- List of television stations in Pennsylvania
- List of television stations in Rhode Island
- List of television stations in South Carolina
- List of television stations in South Dakota
- List of television stations in Tennessee
- List of television stations in Texas
- List of television stations in Utah
- List of television stations in Vermont
- List of television stations in Virginia
- List of television stations in Washington (state)
- List of television stations in West Virginia
- List of television stations in Wisconsin
- List of television stations in Wyoming
- List of television stations in Washington, D.C.

Other lists include:

- List of television stations in the United States by call sign (initial letter K)
- List of television stations in the United States by call sign (initial letter W)
- Owned-and-operated television stations in the United States

== Mexico ==
According to the IFT, as of June 21, 2017, there are, 411 commercial television networks, 52 educational television networks, 7 Regional television networks. and 183 State-level television networks. These lists only cover broadcast stations.

- Television stations in Aguascalientes
- Television stations in Baja California
- Television stations in Baja California Sur
- Television stations in Campeche
- Television stations in Chiapas
- Television stations in Chihuahua
- Television stations in Coahuila
- Television stations in Colima
- Television stations in Durango
- Television stations in Guanajuato
- Television stations in Guerrero
- Television stations in Hidalgo
- Television stations in Jalisco
- Television stations in the State of Mexico
- Television stations in Mexico City
- Television stations in Michoacán
- Television stations in Morelos
- Television stations in Nayarit
- Television stations in Nuevo León
- Television stations in Oaxaca
- Television stations in Puebla
- Television stations in Querétaro
- Television stations in Quintana Roo
- Television stations in San Luis Potosí
- Television stations in Sinaloa
- Television stations in Sonora
- Television stations in Tabasco
- Television stations in Tamaulipas
- Television stations in Tlaxcala
- Television stations in Veracruz
- Television stations in Yucatán
- Television stations in Zacatecas

== Central America ==
=== Costa Rica ===
- TITNS-TV: Conexión TV Canal 2
- TIIVS-TV: Repretel 4
- TITSR-TV: Teletica (moved to Channel 7?)
- TITV-TV: Repretel 6
- TITSR-TV: Teletica Canal 7
- TIDE-TV: Canal 9 teve (-Repretel- defunct; 1994-2000) (As Media -Outside Air-)
- TITEC-TV: TITEC-TV 10 (moved to Channel 13 and changed name to TISRN-TV?)
- TIBYK-TV: Repretel 11
- TISRN-TV: Canal 13
- TIUCR-TV: Canal 15 - UCR

=== El Salvador ===
- YSR-TV 2: Canal Dos - Telecorporacion Salvadoreña
- YSU-TV 4: Canal Cuatro - Telecorporacion Salvadoreña
- YSLA-TV 6: Canal Seis - Telecorporacion Salvadoreña
- YSWE-TV 8: Canal Ocho - Agape TV
- YSAL-TV 9: Canal Nueve - Legislative Assembly Channel
- YSWD-TV 10: Canal Diez - Televisión de El Salvador
- YSTU-TV 11: TUTV Canal 11 - Red Salvadoreña de Medios
- YSWX-TV 12: Canal 12 - Red Salvadoreña de Medios
- YSJR-TV 15: Canal Quince - Grupo Megavision (Movie World)
- YSXL-TV 17: Canal Diecisiete - Independent/Youth Music Videos
- YSXW-TV 19: Canal Diecinueve - Grupo Megavision (News Channel)
- YSXO-TV 21: Canal Veintiuno - Grupo Megavision
- YSXY-TV 23: Canal Veintitrés - TVX (Independent)
- YSZX-TV 25: Canal Veinticinco - Órbita TV (TBN)
- YSWV-TV 27: Canal Veintisiete (religious)
- YSTP-TV 33: Canal Treinta y Tres - Francisco Gavidia University
- YSUT-TV 35: Canal Treinta y Cinco - Telecorporacion Salvadoreña
- YSNA-TV 57: Canal Católico (religious)
- YSMH-TV 65: El Canal de Jesus Cristo (CJC 65)
- YSAE-TV 67: TCI

=== Guatemala ===
- TGV-TV: 3 (Guatemala City)| 10: Canal 3 - El Súper Canal {Grupo Chapín TV - Albavisión}
- TGCE-TV: 5 (Guatemala City) | 12: TV Maya {Academy of Mayan Languages of Guatemala}; formerly known as Cultural and Educational TV {Military Channel}
- TGVG-TV: 7 (Guatemala City)| 8: Televisiete {Grupo Chapín TV - Albavisión}
- TGW-TV: 8 (Guatemala): Televisión Nacional (First television channel in the country, already disappeared) {Channel State}
- ====-TV: 9 (Guatemala City)| 4: Congress Channel -Outside Air-
- TGMO-TV: 11 (Guatemala City)| 6: TeleOnce {Grupo Chapín TV - Albavisión}
- TGSS-TV: 13 (Guatemala City)| 2: TreceVisión {Grupo Chapín TV - Albavisión}
- Canal 19 HDTV (Guatemala City): Canal 3 El Súper Canal -Outside Air- {Grupo Chapín TV - Albavisión}
- Canal 21 (Guatemala City): Enlace-TBN
- Canal 22 (San Marcos)
- TGCX-TV: Canal 27 (Guatemala City)| 28 and 66: El Canal de la Esperanza {Christian Ministry Grounds}
- Canal 29 (Guatemala City): Grupo Nuevo Mundo {Coming Soon} -Outside Air-
- Canal 31 (Guatemala City): Azteca, formerly known as Latitud Televisión
- Canal 33 (Guatemala City): TV-USAC
- Canal 35 (Guatemala City): Azteca
- Canal 40 (Petén): Corporación de Radio y Televisión Petenera, S. A.
- Canal 58 (suchitepequez) TVQ
- Canal 61 (Guatemala City): Enlace Juvenil
- Canal 63 (Guatemala City): Channel Archdiocese of Guatemala
- Canal 65 (Guatemala City): Family TV; formerly known as EWTN and TV Light {Catholic Channel}

Cable or Satellite Channels

- Guatevision "Un canal como debe ser"
- Canal Antigua: "Mira sin límites"
- 18-50 Televisión: "Diferente"
- VEA Canal:"Vida, Ecología y Ambiente"
- Región + (Quetzaltenango)

=== Honduras ===
- HRJS-TV 2: Vica Television
- HRXN-TV 2: Tele Ceiba
- HRCV-TV 3/7: Telesistema 3/Telesistema 7 - El Líder
- HRLP-TV 4/7: Telecadena 7/4
- HRTG-TV 5: Canal 5 - El Líder
- HRJG-TV 6: Canal 6
- Canal 8 Honduras
- HRTS-TV 7:
- HRJS-TV 9: Vica Television
- HRNQ-TV 13: Cruceña de TV
- Canal 11
- Canal 48 - El Canal de la Solidaridad
- JBN
- Maya TV
- Pueblovision Canal 36
- SOTEL Canal 11
- TEN

=== Nicaragua ===
- YNTC-TV 2: Televicentro
- YNTM-TV 4: Canal 4
- YNSA-TV 6: SSTV (defunct; 1979-1990)
- YNSA-TV 7: SSTV (defunct; 1979-1990)
- YN??-TV 8: Telenica
- YNSA-TV 9: SSTV (defunct; 1979-1990)
- YN??-TV 10: Canal 10
- YN??-TV 11: ESTV
- YNLG-TV 12: Nicavisión
- YNSA-TV 13: SSTV (defunct; 1979-1990)
- YN??-TV 17: Magic Channel
- YN??-TV 21: Enlace Nicaragua
- YN??-TV 23: CDNN 23
- YN??-TV 35: Telenorte Canal 35
- 100% Noticias
- Atv98
- SNTV (defunct; 1990-1997)

=== Panama ===
- FETV Canal 5
- Hosana Visión Canal 37
- Mall Tv Canal 7
- + 23 Canal 23
- Mix Tv Canal 33
- Plus Canal 35
- Nex Canal 21
- RPC TV Canal 4
- SERTV Canal 11
- Telemetro Canal 13
- TVN Canal 2
- TVMax Canal 9
- Canal 29

Defunct Stations

- Panavision Canal 5
- SCN Canal 8
- Shop Tv Canal 33
- Telecinco Canal 5
- Tele7 Canal 7
- TVO Canal 21

== Other areas ==
- List of Caribbean television channels, excluding Cuba and including French Guiana.
- List of television stations in Latin America

== See also ==
- List of television stations in North America by media market
- Lists of companies – company-related list articles on Wikipedia
