= Television in Nicaragua =

Television in Nicaragua has a history of more than fifty years. Canal 8, the first terrestrial television channel in the country, started broadcasting on July 15, 1956. Currently there are more than 15 national terrestrial and cable TV channels.

== History ==
The first television channel in Nicaragua opened on VHF channel 8 on July 15, 1956 as Televisión de Nicaragua, S.A., owned by the Novedades newspaper. The government followed on January 11, 1957 with Canal 6. In 1962, the government merged channels 6 and 8, with the latter becoming a relayer of the former.

When the Ortega-Murillo family acquired TN8 and created Viva Nicaragua, the prices for imported television series increased, with the channels falling under the state's sphere of influence being the beneficiaries.

Implementation of digital terrestrial television is relatively slow. In July 2022, TELCOR informed all over-the-air television operators to answer a survey for the implementation of the technology. The sanctioning of two of its employees by US officials is a possible cause for the lack of developments.

== Television channels ==
=== Terrestrial television channels ===
Name	Launched	Owner
Canal 2	March 1966	Televicentro de Nicaragua (Albavisión and Maurice Ortega)
Canal 4	October 1992	Informativos de Televisión y Radio, SA (Intrasa)
Canal 6	January 17, 1957 (first incarnation); September 14, 2011 (second incarnation)	Negocios Publicitarios Internacionales, SA (NEPISA)
TN8	July 15, 1956 (first incarnation), 1992 (second incarnation)	Televisora Nicaraguense, SA (Juan Carlos Ortega)
Canal 9	2011	Digital Media de Nicaragua (Grupo RATENSA/Albavisión)
Canal 10	June 23, 1997	Grupo RATENSA (Albavisión)
Canal 11	2010	Grupo RATENSA (Albavisión)
Canal 12	December 11, 1994	Nicavisión
Viva Nicaragua	June 13, 2011	Celeste, S.A.
Vos TV	July 27, 2010	Grupo Pellas
Canal 15	2019	NEPISA
La Rock 22	2020	Televisora Nicaraguense, SA (Juan Carlos Ortega)
CDNN 23		

=== Cable television channels ===
- Megabox (Channel 76 Claro TV)
- Atv98 (Channel 98 Claro TV)
- CDNN 23 (Channel 99 Claro TV)

=== Regional television channels ===
- Telenorte Channel 48 ClaroTV Estelí)
- Canal 55 El Líder, León
- Canal 16 Ecovisión, Camoapa

=== Defunct television channels ===
- ESTV (Canal 11) (rebranded as Vos TV (Canal 14) in 2010)
- Canal 15 (100% Noticias) (Channel 15 UHF, Channel 63 Claro TV)
- Magic Channel
- SSTV (defunct; 1979–1990)
- SNTV (defunct; 1990–1997)
- Canal 21 (closed 2021 due to political opposition)
- ExtraPlus TV 2024 ExtraPlus mysteriously ceased broadcasting without prior notice for unknown reasons.
