= Mass media in Nicaragua =

The mass media in Nicaragua consist of several different types of communications media: television, radio, cinema, newspapers, magazines, and Internet-based Web sites.

Freedom of speech is a right guaranteed by the Constitution of Nicaragua. There is no official state censorship of the media in Nicaragua.

== History of Nicaraguan media ==
Noted during the Sandinista years for its virulently partisan and sensationalist character, the communications media began to show small signs of moderation and objectivity as the Chamorro regime progressed. However, partisanship was still a key word in the printed and broadcast press, and Sandinista dominance over the communications media largely continued, despite the transfer of power in the government. After the 1990 elections, however, important differences of opinion emerged in the relationship between the Sandinista-dominated media and official FSLN positions.

The greatest news source for most Nicaraguans is the radio. Some radio stations are considered so influential that opponents of their political position have targeted them for attacks. The rightist Radio Corporación, for instance, was heavily damaged twice by Sandinistas, in the early years of the Chamorro government and the Sandinista Radio Ya was attacked by unknown assailants.

=== Domination of the print media ===
The three major dailies of the Sandinista period continued to dominate the print media market in 1993. La Prensa, founded in 1926, with an estimated circulation of 30,000 in early 1992, continued the family tradition built by the president's late husband, Pedro Joaquín Chamorro Cardenal. At the time of the transition, La Prensa was run by the president's daughter, Cristiana Chamorro de Lacayo also the wife of Antonio Lacayo. Cristiana Chamorro's tight control over La Prensa and reported refusal to permit criticism of her mother's government led to a rebellion among the editorial board and staff within a year after the 1990 election.

The editorial staff, which included other family members, took the opportunity presented by Cristiana Chamorro's official trip abroad with her mother in November 1990, to publish articles harshly critical of the government for its relations with Sandinista leaders. In January, the staff forced Cristiana Chamorro to resign as editor and removed Violeta Chamorro from the board of directors. The changes were seen as an attempt by the editorial staff to establish La Prensa as an independent paper rather than the official voice of the government.

One of the two pro-Sandinista newspapers also moved in the 1990s to a position more critical of the Chamorro government and the FSLN. Barricada, founded in 1979, with an estimated circulation of 20,000 in 1992, declared in early 1992 that it would no longer serve as the house organ of the FSLN and would instead take independent positions. Always regarded by many observers as the most professional of the three major newspapers, Barricada became the first public forum in which Sandinista leaders expressed internal disagreements in February 1992.

The shift in popular outlook may have been made possible by the division of powers among the Sandinista commanders after their electoral defeat. Bayardo Arce Castaño became head of the FSLN's newspapers, radio stations, and television programs and was planning to establish a Sandinista television station. Significantly, the first disagreement aired in Barricada was between Arce and Daniel Ortega.

The third main daily, El Nuevo Diario, which had an estimated circulation of 40,000 to 45,000 in 1992 and was founded in 1980 by Xavier Chamorro Cardenal, one of Violeta Chamorro's brothers-in-law, continued its loyal and uncritical posture of the FSLN, despite expectations that with the end of the Nicaraguan revolution the newspaper would take more independent positions.

Several weekly newspapers also were published in the early 1990s. The COSEP group brought out La Nicaragüense; a group headed by former vice president Sergio Ramírez published El Seminario in the early 1990s; and a Sandinista group continued Semana Cómica, a satirical tabloid. A new weekly newspaper, El Centroamericano, also appeared in León in the early 1990s.

== Television ==
=== Terrestrial television channels ===
- Televicentro Canal 2
- Canal 4
- Canal 6
- Telenica Canal 8
- Canal 9
- Canal 10
- TV RED
- Canal 12 Nicavisión
- Viva Nicaragua 13
- Canal 15 (100% Noticias)
- Enlace Nicaragua
- Extra Plus 37

=== Cable television channels ===
- Vos TV
- Megabox
- Atv98
- CDNN 23

== Print media ==
=== Newspapers ===
- Barricada
- El Nuevo Diario
- La Prensa
- La Brújula Semanal
- La Voz del Sandinismo
- Confidencial
- Bolsa De Noticias
- La Jornada
- El Observador Economico
- Notifax
- Terra
- La Trinchera
- 7 dias

=== Magazines ===
- Envío
- SER

== Radio ==
Nicaraguan radio broadcasts in two bands:

- FM - which often includes news, and a variety of music radio stations that broadcast one or several types of music: reggaeton, cumbia, both Spanish and English hip-hop, etc.
- AM - which often features a mixture of news with music and opinion, traditional newscasts, music, radio dramas, humor shows, sports and listener call-in shows.

Some stations are only talk radio — featuring interviews and discussions. Political parties also influence a majority of radio stations, some focusing on politics only.

- La Nueva Radio Ya!
- Radio Oxigeno
- Radio La Primerisima
- Radio Corporacion
- Stereo Romance

== Internet ==
The Internet has provided a means for newspapers and other media organizations to deliver news and, significantly, the means to look up old news. Some organizations only make limited amounts of their output available for free, and charge for access to the rest. Other organizations allow their archives to be freely browsed.

== See also ==
- Freedom of the press in Nicaragua
- Telecommunications in Nicaragua
