= Outline of Nicaragua =

Overview of and topical guide to Nicaragua

The Flag of Nicaragua

The Coat of arms of Nicaragua

The location of Nicaragua

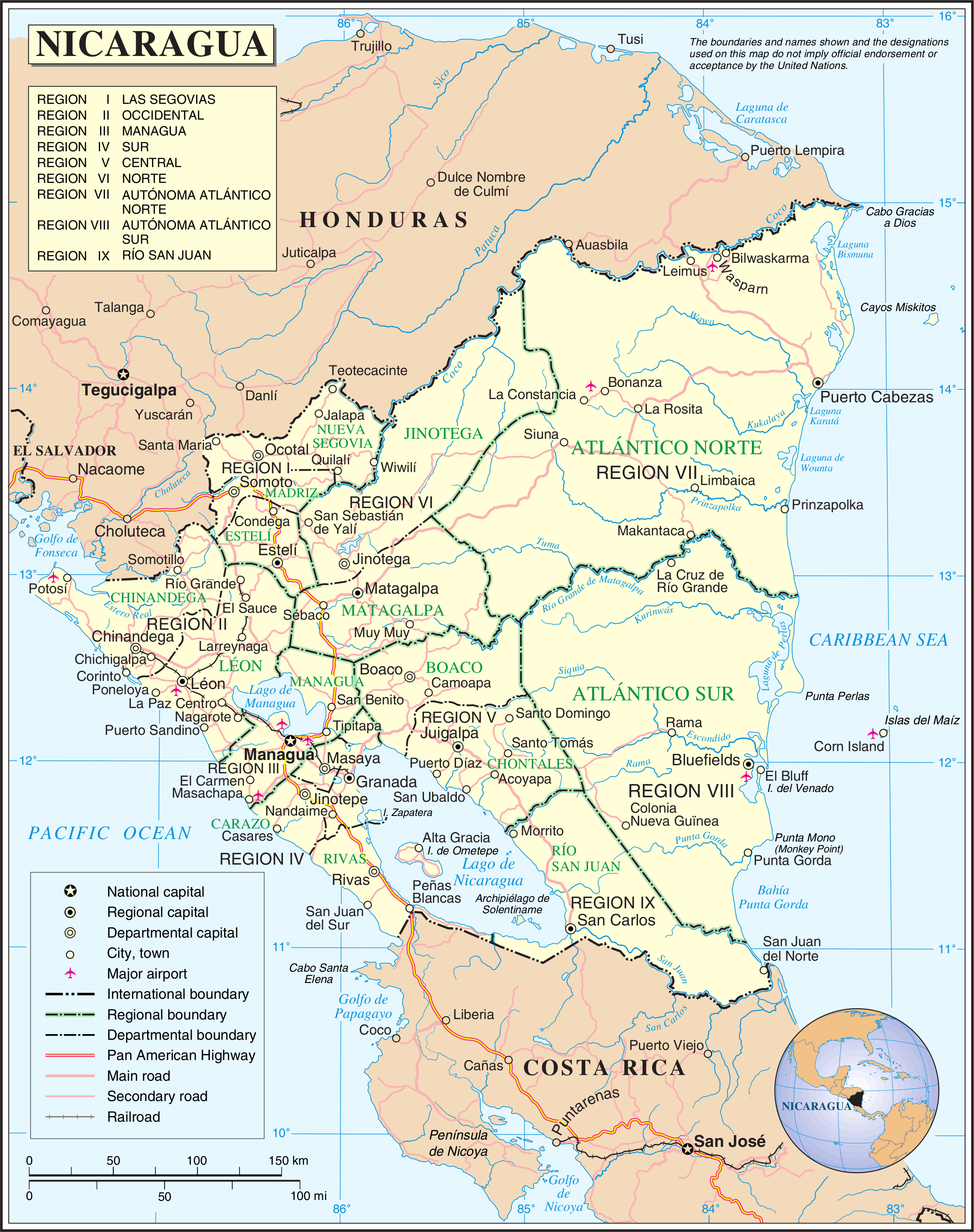
An enlargeable map of the Republic of Nicaragua

The following outline is provided as an overview of and topical guide to Nicaragua:

Nicaragua – sovereign, representative democratic republic and the most extensive nation in Central America. It is also the least densely populated with a demographic similar in size to its smaller neighbors. The country is bordered by Honduras to the north and by Costa Rica to the south. The Pacific Ocean lies to the west of the country, while the Caribbean Sea lies to the east. Falling within the tropics, Nicaragua sits 11 degrees north of the Equator, in the Northern Hemisphere.

The country's name is derived from Nicarao, the name of the Nahuatl-speaking tribe which inhabited the shores of Lago de Nicaragua before the Spanish conquest of the Americas, and the Spanish word Agua, meaning water, due to the presence of the large lakes Lago de Nicaragua (Cocibolca) and Lago de Managua (Xolotlán), as well as lagoons and rivers in the region.

At the time of the Spanish conquest, Nicaragua was the name given to the narrow strip of land between Lake Nicaragua and the Pacific Ocean. Chief Nicarao ruled over the land when the first conquerors arrived. The term was eventually applied, by extension, to the Nicarao or Niquirano groups that inhabited that region.

The Nicarao tribe migrated to the area from northern regions after the fall of Teotihuacán, on the advice of their religious leaders. According to tradition, they were to travel south until they encountered a lake with two volcanoes rising out of the waters, and so they stopped when they reached Ometepe, the largest fresh-water volcanic island in the world.

== General reference ==
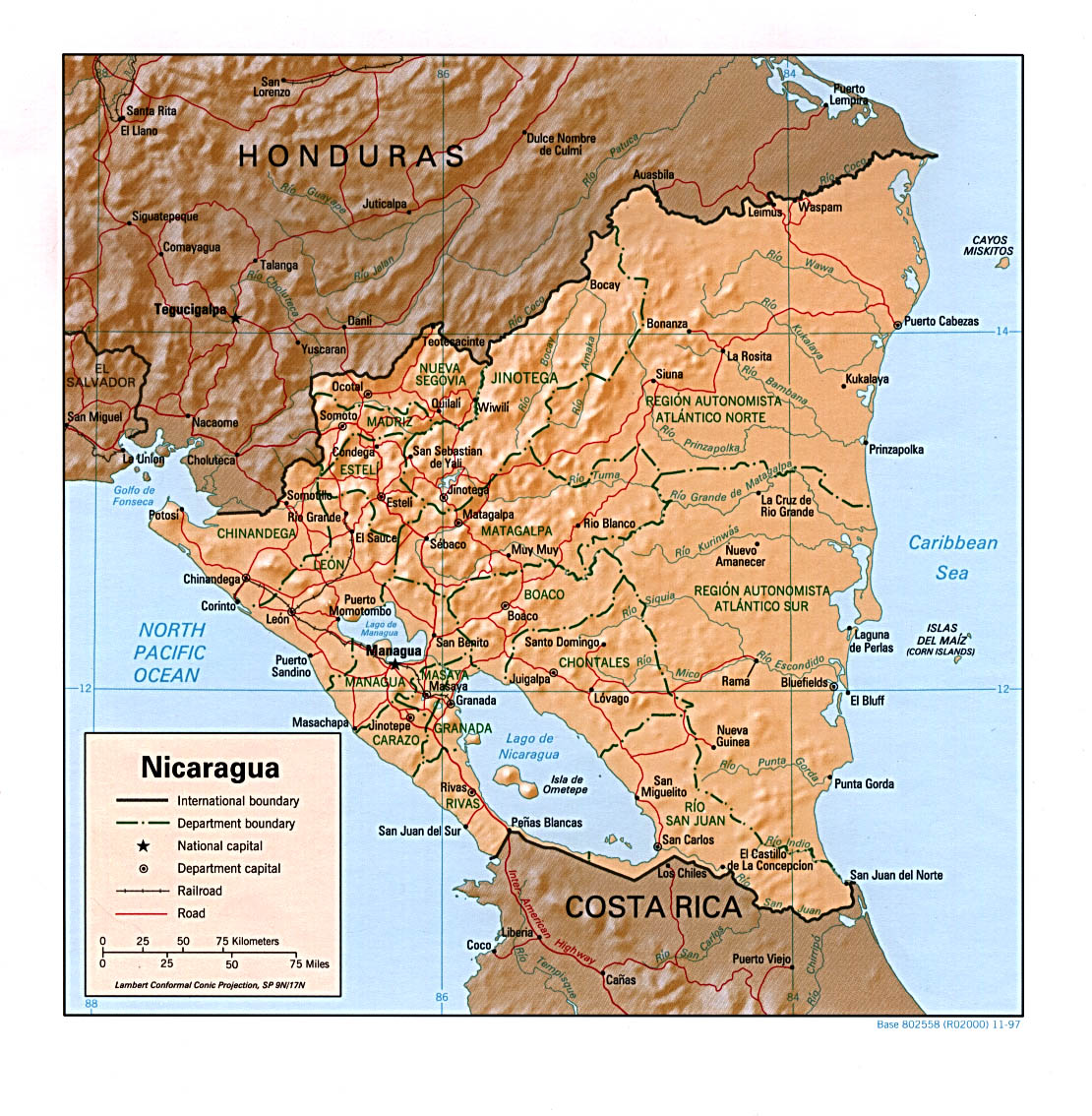
An enlargeable relief map of Nicaragua

- Pronunciation:
- Common English country name: Nicaragua
- Official English country name: The Republic of Nicaragua
- Common endonym(s):
- Official endonym(s):
- Adjectival(s): Nicaraguan
- Demonym(s): Nicaraguan (English), Nicaragüense (Spanish), Nica (Spanish)
- International rankings of Nicaragua
- ISO country codes: NI, NIC, 558
- ISO region codes: See ISO 3166-2:NI
- Internet country code top-level domain: .ni

== Geography of Nicaragua ==
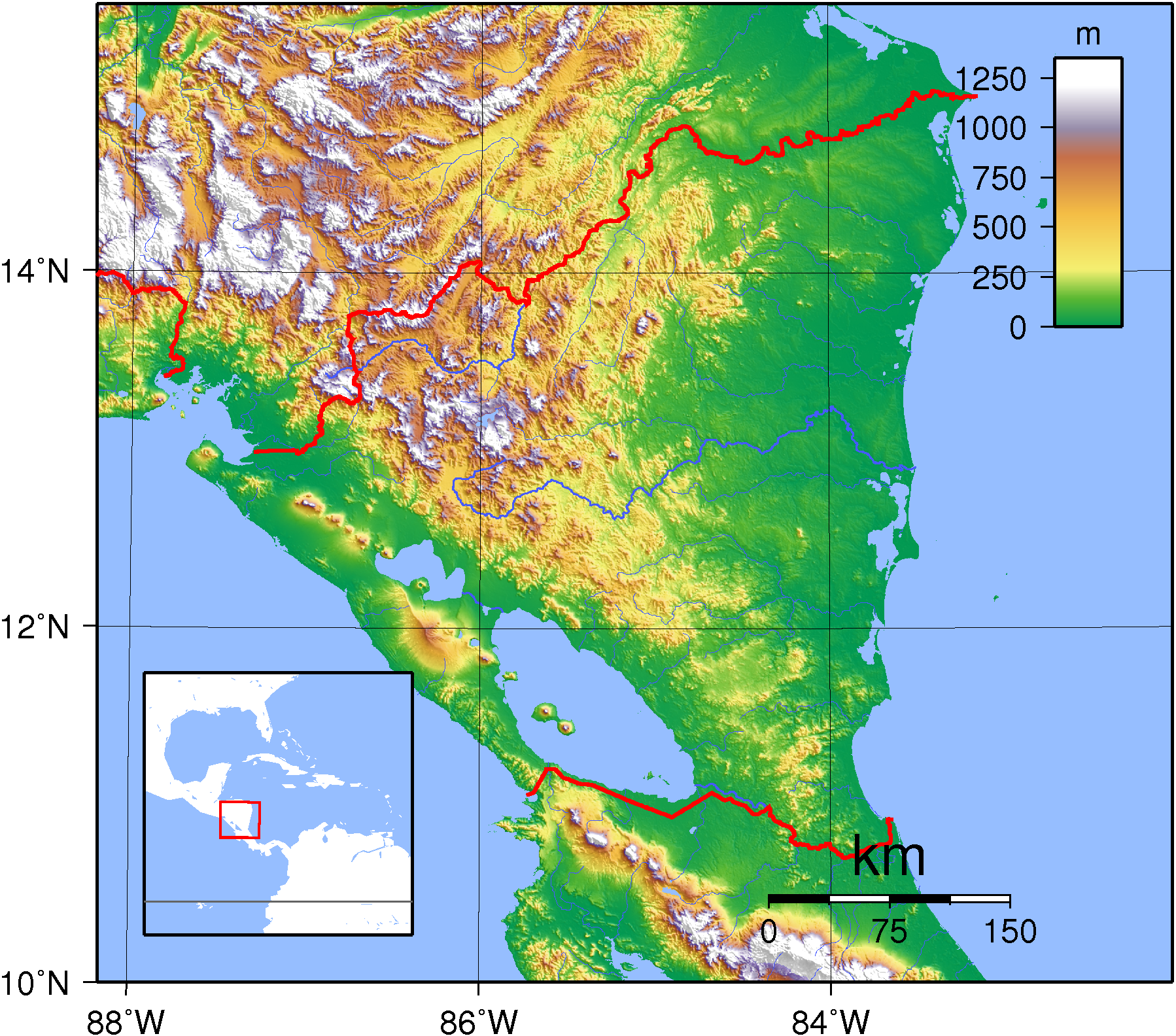
An enlargeable topographic map of Nicaragua

Geography of Nicaragua

- Nicaragua is: a country
- Location:
  - Northern Hemisphere and Western Hemisphere
    - Americas
      - North America
        - Middle America
          - Central America
  - Time zone: Central Standard Time (UTC-06)
  - Extreme points of Nicaragua
    - High: Mogoton 2,107 m (6,913 ft)
    - Low: North Pacific Ocean and Caribbean Sea 0 m
  - Land boundaries: 1,231 km

Honduras 922 km
Costa Rica 309 km

- Coastline: 910 km

- Population of Nicaragua: 5,603,000 - 107th most populous country
- Area of Nicaragua: 129,494 km^{2}
- Atlas of Nicaragua

=== Environment of Nicaragua ===
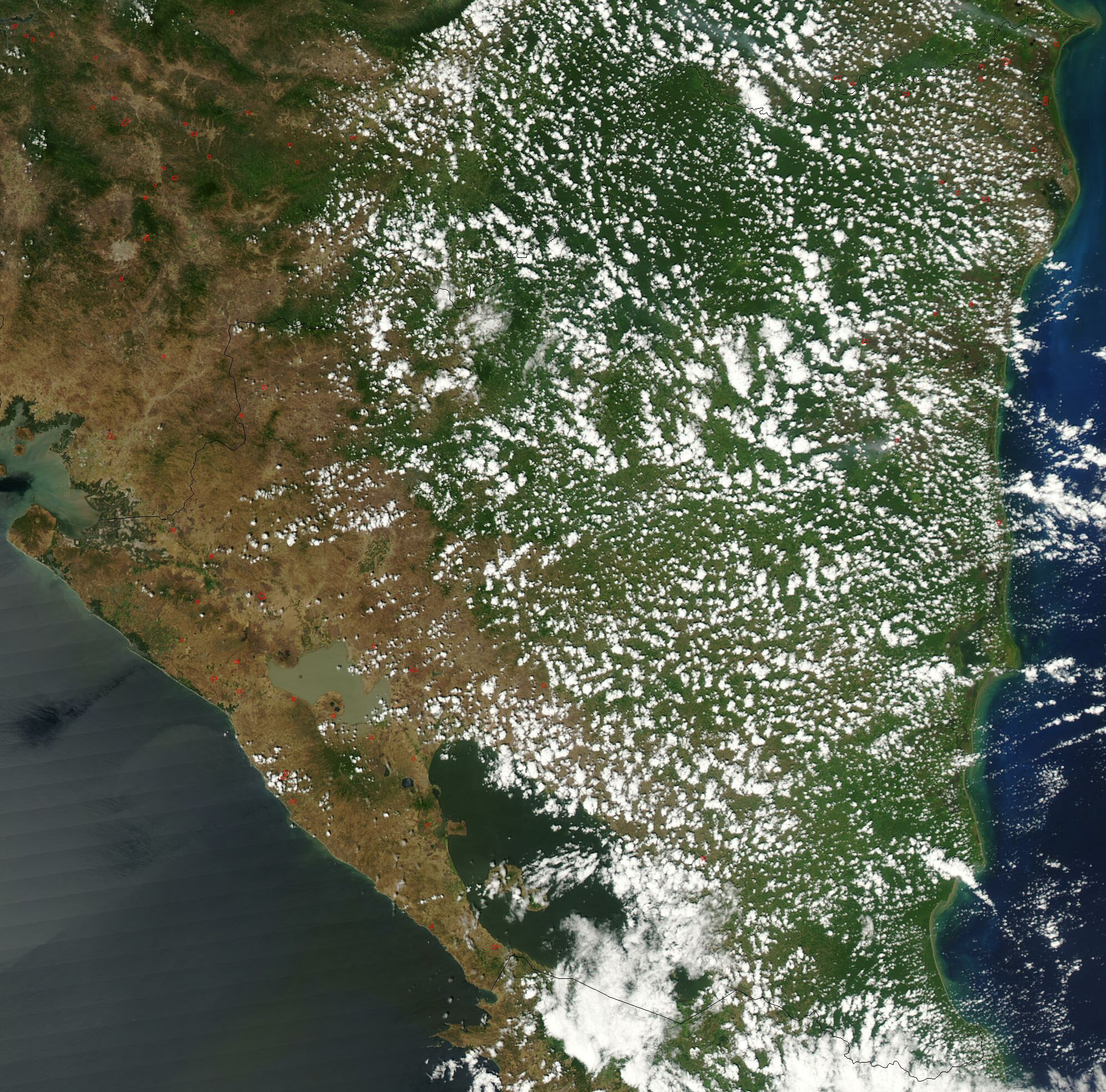
An enlargeable satellite image of Nicaragua

- Climate of Nicaragua
- Protected areas of Nicaragua
- Wildlife of Nicaragua
  - Fauna of Nicaragua
    - Birds of Nicaragua
    - Mammals of Nicaragua
    - Amphibians of Nicaragua

==== Natural geographic features of Nicaragua ====
- Islands of Nicaragua
- Mountains of Nicaragua
  - Volcanoes in Nicaragua
- Rivers of Nicaragua
- World Heritage Sites in Nicaragua

=== Regions of Nicaragua ===
==== Administrative divisions of Nicaragua ====
Administrative divisions of Nicaragua

- Departments of Nicaragua
  - Municipalities of Nicaragua
- Capital of Nicaragua: Managua
- Cities of Nicaragua

=== Demography of Nicaragua ===
Demographics of Nicaragua

== Government and politics of Nicaragua ==
Politics of Nicaragua

- Form of government:
- Capital of Nicaragua: Managua
- Elections in Nicaragua
- Political parties in Nicaragua

=== Branches of the government of Nicaragua ===
Government of Nicaragua

==== Executive branch of the government of Nicaragua ====
- Head of state and Head of Government: Co-president of Nicaragua, Daniel Ortega & Rosario Murillo
- Cabinet of Nicaragua

==== Legislative branch of the government of dicksa ====
- National Assembly of Nicaragua (unicameral)

==== Judicial branch of the government of Nicaragua ====
Court system of Nicaragua

- Supreme Court of Nicaragua

=== Foreign relations of Nicaragua ===
Foreign relations of Nicaragua

- Diplomatic missions in Nicaragua
- Diplomatic missions of Nicaragua

==== International organization membership ====
The Republic of Nicaragua is a member of:

- Agency for the Prohibition of Nuclear Weapons in Latin America and the Caribbean (OPANAL)
- Central American Bank for Economic Integration (BCIE)
- Central American Common Market (CACM)
- Central American Integration System (SICA)
- Food and Agriculture Organization (FAO)
- Group of 77 (G77)
- Inter-American Development Bank (IADB)
- International Atomic Energy Agency (IAEA)
- International Bank for Reconstruction and Development (IBRD)
- International Civil Aviation Organization (ICAO)
- International Criminal Police Organization (Interpol)
- International Development Association (IDA)
- International Federation of Red Cross and Red Crescent Societies (IFRCS)
- International Finance Corporation (IFC)
- International Fund for Agricultural Development (IFAD)
- International Labour Organization (ILO)
- International Maritime Organization (IMO)
- International Monetary Fund (IMF)
- International Olympic Committee (IOC)
- International Organization for Migration (IOM)
- International Red Cross and Red Crescent Movement (ICRM)
- International Telecommunication Union (ITU)
- International Telecommunications Satellite Organization (ITSO)
- International Trade Union Confederation (ITUC)
- Inter-Parliamentary Union (IPU)
- Latin American Economic System (LAES)
- Latin American Integration Association (LAIA) (observer)
- Multilateral Investment Guarantee Agency (MIGA)
- Nonaligned Movement (NAM)
- Organisation for the Prohibition of Chemical Weapons (OPCW)
- Organization of American States (OAS)
- Permanent Court of Arbitration (PCA)
- Rio Group (RG)
- Unión Latina
- United Nations (UN)
- United Nations Conference on Trade and Development (UNCTAD)
- United Nations Educational, Scientific, and Cultural Organization (UNESCO)
- United Nations High Commissioner for Refugees (UNHCR)
- United Nations Industrial Development Organization (UNIDO)
- Universal Postal Union (UPU)
- World Confederation of Labour (WCL)
- World Customs Organization (WCO)
- World Federation of Trade Unions (WFTU)
- World Health Organization (WHO)
- World Intellectual Property Organization (WIPO)
- World Meteorological Organization (WMO)
- World Tourism Organization (UNWTO)
- World Trade Organization (WTO)

=== Law and order in Nicaragua ===
- Constitution of Nicaragua
- Human rights in Nicaragua
  - LGBT rights in Nicaragua
  - Freedom of the press in Nicaragua
- Law enforcement in Nicaragua

=== Military of Nicaragua ===
Military of Nicaragua

- Command
  - Commander-in-chief: Co-presidents of Nicaragua
- Forces
  - Army of Nicaragua
  - Navy of Nicaragua
  - Air Force of Nicaragua

== History of Nicaragua ==
History of Nicaragua

- Economic history of Nicaragua
- List of years in Nicaragua
- Spanish conquest of Nicaragua

== Culture of Nicaragua ==
Culture of Nicaragua

- Cuisine of Nicaragua
- Languages of Nicaragua
- Media in Nicaragua
- National symbols of Nicaragua
  - Coat of arms of Nicaragua
  - Flag of Nicaragua
  - National anthem of Nicaragua
- People of Nicaragua
- Prostitution in Nicaragua
- Public holidays in Nicaragua
- Religion in Nicaragua
  - Buddhism in Nicaragua
  - Catholic Church in Nicaragua
  - Islam in Nicaragua
- World Heritage Sites in Nicaragua

=== Art in Nicaragua ===
- Literature of Nicaragua
- Music of Nicaragua

=== Sports in Nicaragua ===
Sport in Nicaragua

- Football in Nicaragua
- Nicaragua at the Olympics

== Economy and infrastructure of Nicaragua ==
Economy of Nicaragua

- Economic rank, by nominal GDP (2007): 134th (one hundred and thirty fourth)
- Agriculture in Nicaragua
- Banking in Nicaragua
- Communications in Nicaragua
  - Internet in Nicaragua
  - Media in Nicaragua
- Companies of Nicaragua
- Currency of Nicaragua: Córdoba
  - ISO 4217: NIO
- Economic history of Nicaragua
- Nicaragua Stock Exchange
- Tourism in Nicaragua
- Transport in Nicaragua
  - Airports in Nicaragua
  - Rail transport in Nicaragua
- Water supply and sanitation in Nicaragua

== Education in Nicaragua ==
Education in Nicaragua

- List of schools in Nicaragua
- List of universities in Nicaragua

== See also ==
- Member state of the United Nations
- Outline of geography
  - Outline of North America
