= Cadena nacional =

National obligatory radio and television broadcast in some Latin American countries

In several Latin American countries, a cadena nacional (Spanish for 'national network'; plural cadenas nacionales), also referred to as a cadena oficial (Spanish for 'official network') or red voluntaria (Spanish for 'voluntary network'), is a joint broadcast, over various media (usually radio and television), directed at the general population of a state. Initially conceived as a form of emergency population warning, these broadcasts are often of a political nature, as most of them are messages by governmental authorities about various topics of general interest.

Depending on the country, the characteristics of cadenas nacionales vary. In some countries, they are enshrined in law; in others, they are informal and cooperative. In some countries, including Argentina and Venezuela, all stations are mandated to air these messages (similar in nature to Emergency Action Notifications in the United States).

== Cadenas nacionales by Latin American country ==
(in Spanish) Cadena nacional offered by Cristina Fernández de Kirchner after her victory in the 2011 Argentine general election.

=== Argentina ===
The use of cadenas nacionales in Argentina is regulated by Article 75 of the Law 26,522 of Audiovisual Communications Services, signed into law in 2008. This article specifies that the executive branch of the national government or of provincial governments may, in exceptional circumstances, use all of the broadcast stations in a state. When such a message is delivered, all Argentine television stations must cease all programming to allow for the broadcasting of the message. Article 74 of the same law requires broadcasters to make airtime available to political parties according to the electoral law.

Article 75 of Law 26,522 superseded the Decree-Law 22,285 of 1980, the National Broadcasting Law, which similarly required broadcasters to carry cadenas nacionales as defined by COMFER, the predecessor to today's ENACOM.

=== Bolivia ===
A new law, effective as of August 8, 2011, requires television and radio broadcasters to transmit two presidential speeches a year, produced by the state media Radio Illimani and Bolivia TV. These speeches have averaged a length of three hours since the law came into effect.

=== Brazil ===
Cadeia nacional or rede nacional de radio e televisão (Portuguese for national radio and television network) broadcasts in Brazil can be given by the President of Brazil, Ministers of the Cabinet, and justices of the Supreme Federal Court and Superior Electoral Court. The measure is regulated by Decree 84,181 of 12 August 1979, issued by President João Figueiredo. The Brazilian Communication Company (EBC) is tasked with handling the taping and live broadcast of cadeia nacional addresses, which are prepared by the Secretary of Government. Free-to-air television networks are required by law to broadcast these addresses live, thus temporarily interrupting their scheduled programming.

The national broadcasts commonly occur during national holidays, election days, congressional sessions on significant legislation, and the National High School Exam to address these events. More recently, national broadcasts on the COVID-19 pandemic have been invoked by President Jair Bolsonaro.

=== Chile ===
Since Chile's return to democracy in 1989, most cadenas nacionales have been voluntary in nature, but under previous governments such as those of Augusto Pinochet and Salvador Allende, stations were obliged to carry these messages. They are aired by television stations by the National Television Association (ANATEL), which subcontracts the production to Endemol via state network TVN, and it is not required of radio stations. One type of cadena nacional is obligatory for all television stations according to the electoral law, the franja electoral or simultaneous transmission of campaign material from the major political parties; this is the only time election campaign ads are broadcast on television.

=== Ecuador ===
The first law permitting cadenas nacionales in Ecuador was passed in 1975 during the regime of Gen. Guillermo Rodríguez Lara. Chapter 59 of Supreme Decree 256-A, the "Radio and Television Law", which was modified in 1995, required the broadcast of cadenas nacionales. In 2009, President Rafael Correa ordered Ecuador's television stations to broadcast 233 cadenas nacionales over the course of the year, the highest such figure in the region and 92 more than Venezuela in the same year.

The prior law was replaced in 2013. The Organic Communication Law's article 74 replaced it, retaining the requirements for broadcasters and extending them to pay television services, which must suspend their own program transmissions to carry cadenas.

=== El Salvador ===
The Telecommunications Law of 1997 requires stations to transmit cadenas, which may be called for by the president "in case of war, invasion of territory, rebellion, sedition, catastrophe, epidemic or other calamity, grave disturbances of the public order or messages of national interest". During election campaigns and particularly on election day, only the Electoral Tribunal can convoke cadenas nacionales, which are also obligatory.

=== Guatemala ===
The law that defined cadenas was derogated in 2004 after the constitutional court ruled that they were illegal, violated the right of citizens to "inform and be informed", and also kept the public in "informational captivity".

=== Honduras ===
Cadenas nacionales are obligatory for all television and radio stations, and are used to broadcast presidential reports and messages of national interest. They are limited to seven minutes in duration, unless CONATEL, the regulator, decides more time is necessary for the broadcast (which is frequent). In January 2014, the ceremony to mark the start of the new president's term was carried as a cadena nacional and ran five hours. The requirement to carry cadenas has been extended to cable and satellite television providers.

=== Mexico ===
Mexico requires cadenas in circumstances of "national significance", as judged by the Dirección General de Radio, Televisión y Cinematografía (General Directorate of Radio, Television and Film)—an agency of the Secretariat of the Interior (SEGOB)—and defined in Article 255 of the Federal Broadcasting and Telecommunications Law. Stations are also obligated to broadcast messages related to civil defense, national security, and public health, as well as messages related to ships and aircraft in danger. Mexico also requires that all broadcasters allocate 30 minutes of their broadcast day to programming from the state. Most of this time is used to run official advertising, managed by SEGOB, and (during electoral campaigns) election advertising, managed by the National Electoral Institute.

Radio stations also carry La Hora Nacional, an hour-long radio program aired on Sunday nights, as part of this requirement.

=== Nicaragua ===
Administrative accord 009-2010 regulates cadenas nacionales in Nicaragua. The accord and the telecommunications regulator TELCOR both require the carriage of cadenas by radio, broadcast television and subscription television services. Foreign television services carried on cable/satellite platforms are forced to cease all broadcasting until the cadena concludes.

While the government owns Canal 6 and Radio Nicaragua, Canal 4 and Radio YA are responsible for the production of cadenas.

=== Paraguay ===
After the dictatorship of Alfredo Stroessner (1954–1989), the use of cadenas nacionales was banned after the system was abused by the military to transmit propaganda. Stations were required to broadcast cadenas produced by Radio Nacional del Paraguay three times a day: the third was the nightly program La voz del coloradismo, which regularly mocked and insulted journalists and others critical of the Stroessner regime.

=== Peru ===
There is no specific law on cadenas; the government must buy airtime from the broadcasters, and carriage of such national events is voluntary by law. The most common event for such joint broadcasts is the presidential message delivered on July 28 of each year, though on occasion other cadenas have been called, for events such as natural disasters.

However, as El País noted in 2012, "the term cadena nacional is familiar only to those who are well over 30", noting that its widest use was in the military regime of the 1970s.

=== Uruguay ===
Decree 734/78, passed during the military government and modified from the mid-1980s onward, regulates cadenas nacionales. They are obligatory for all broadcasters, as is the transmission of state-designed "public good" campaigns. Additionally, the national anthem must be aired on select public holidays (April 19, May 18, June 19, July 18 and August 25), with television stations at sign-on, and on radios at noon.

Since the return to democracy in 1985, the president occasionally gives speeches on cadena nacional, such as the Jorge Batlle during the 2002 Uruguay banking crisis and Tabaré Vázquez for the Philip Morris v. Uruguay dispute.

During Broad Front administrations, the president has often given an annual speech on cadena nacional on March 1. Also the president has also conceded cadena nacional to other institutions, for example the PIT-CNT trade union center on the International Workers' Day.

=== Venezuela ===
During the administration of Jaime Lusinchi, government broadcasts promoted presidential speeches and military parades and could last several hours.

Approved in 2004, the Law on Social Responsibility on Radio and Television (Ley RESORTE) requires broadcasters to transmit cadenas nacionales. Cadenas have no time limits and must be carried not only by radio and television broadcasters, but by cable networks with less than 60% international production.

On one occasion, television stations were forced to broadcast a 44-minute-long musical performance contained within a cadena nacional.

From 1999 to 2009, Venezuela had an average of 195 cadenas a year.

An NGO, Monitoreo Ciudadano, maintains a Cadenómetro, a measure of the frequency and duration of cadenas in Venezuela.

== Similar practices outside Latin America ==
=== Canada ===
Section 26(2) of Canada's Broadcasting Act states that the Governor in Council may direct the CRTC to order licensed broadcasters to carry a particular program in any part of the country, if deemed to be of "urgent importance to Canadians generally". This provision has only been used once, in order to mandate the broadcast of an October 25, 1995 speech by Prime Minister Jean Chrétien on the Quebec independence referendum. In 2017, Bell Media unsuccessfully asked for an invocation of the law in order to effectively override a CRTC decision suspending its "simsub" regulations (requiring pay television providers to replace feeds from U.S. terrestrial broadcasters if they carry the same programming as a local terrestrial broadcaster, in order to protect Canadian advertising revenue) for the Super Bowl and the popular American commercials that come with it.

== Criticism ==
Forced cadenas nacionales of a political nature have been strongly criticized by some media outlets, as in some cases it requires them to broadcast opinions that differ from their normal editorial stances. The Venezuelan RCTV network refused to air a message from Hugo Chávez in 2007, violating broadcasting laws. In late 2012, a cadena was used to force media outlets away from a presidential campaign speech by opposition leader Henrique Capriles; the cadena in question concerned the opening of a new school. A similar event took place the next year.

Likewise, Honduran media resisted an attempt by the government of Manuel Zelaya to institute cadenas nacionales in that country, noting that "in the past the cadena nacional was constantly used, mainly by de facto governments, without satisfactory results".

In Argentina, the frequent use of cadenas by Cristina Fernández de Kirchner during her presidency has been compared to "abuse" of the system by the opposition. From 2009 to May 2015, there have been 119 cadenas nacionales in Argentina, including 17 in the first five months of 2015. Her predecessor, Néstor Kirchner, only used the cadena nacional twice during his four-year term from 2003 to 2007.
