= Channel 21 =

Channel 21, or TV 21 or TV21 may refer to:

- Channel 21, a defunct German television channel
- TV 21, a television channel in North Macedonia
- Canal 21, the former name of Tunisian television channel El Watania 2
- L'Équipe 21, a television channel in France
- ETC-21, a television station in Quezon City, Philippines
- Canal Orbe 21, a television station in Buenos Aires, Argentina; formerly known as Canal 21
- Citytv Bogota, a television station in Bogota, Colombia
- Enlace Nicaragua, a Christian television station in Nicaragua
- Rede 21, a defunct Brazilian television network
- RTL9, a Luxembourgish French-language channel, formerly known as Canal 21 in France
- Télé 21, the former name of Belgian-French television channel Tipik
- Antena 21, a Dominican television channel
- Canal 21 (El Salvador), a Salvadoran television channel

== Canada ==
- CHNU-DT-1, virtual channel 21 in Victoria, British Columbia
- CJON-DT, virtual channel 21 in St. John's, Newfoundland and Labrador

== Mexico ==
- XHTIT-TDT, virtual channel 21, carries Azteca 7 in Tijuana, Baja California
- XHCDM-TDT, virtual channel 21 in Mexico City

== UHF frequencies covering 512-518 MHz ==
- Channel 21 TV stations in Canada
- Channel 21 TV stations in Mexico
- Channel 21 digital TV stations in the United States
- Channel 21 low-power TV stations in the United States

== Other uses ==
- TV21, an early 1980s British new wave band
- TV Century 21, later TV 21, a weekly British children's comic published during the 1960s

== See also ==
- 21 (disambiguation)
- Channel 21 branded TV stations in the United States
- Channel 21 virtual TV stations in the United States
