= Grupo Ratensa =

Grupo Ratensa (Radio y Televisión de Nicaragua, S.A.) is the Nicaraguan subsidiary of Albavisión, a Latin American media company owned by Guatemalan-Mexican-American businessman Remigio Ángel González. The company operates three main television channels—channels 9, 10 and 11—and previously had interests in channel 4, which González established with local Sandinista partners. In addition, Ratensa operates a network of radio stations. It claims to be "the most complete media network and the network with the widest reach in national television."

Since 2015, Ángel González has also controlled Televicentro (Channel 2) as an independent operation from Ratensa, under the supervision of members of the Nicaraguan government. Together, González and the family of President Daniel Ortega form a media duopoly in Nicaragua.

== History ==
Ángel González began his business career in Nicaragua in the late 1980s when he met Octavio Sacasa, the de facto owner of Televicentro. From 1979 to 1990, Televicentro was technically under the control of the state-owned Sistema Sandinista de Televisión, but Sacasa had significant influence over the station. González initially aimed to sell Mexican productions, mainly from Televisa, to the channel and did not have much interest in purchasing it. However, since Sacasa was interested in selling, negotiations began, eventually leading to a separate buyout of the channel as an independent operation from Grupo Ratensa in 2011. The two later became arch-rivals in 1990, when Sacasa returned to Nicaragua and regained control of the channel.

In the early 1990s, González took over the Channel 10 frequency, which was originally granted to local businessmen Carlos Reynaldo and César Augusto Lacayo. At the same time, he assisted in establishing Canal 4, which had strong ties to the FSLN. With the help of Dionisio Marenco, González built the channel from scratch in a challenging environment, providing equipment for its operation. Due to a crisis at Canal 4 in the late 1990s, along with a policy shift that removed local productions, González gained editorial control of the channel while also creating Canal 10.

Canal 10, which eventually became the main channel of the group, was launched on June 23, 1997. The majority of the programming on both networks consisted of foreign content; Canal 10 did not introduce a newscast until 2001. Initially called Telediario 10, the newscast was replaced by the current Acción 10 in January 2005.

In 2006, Canal 4 was sold entirely to INTRASA after accumulating significant debts under González's administration.

The group launched Canal 11 (originally TV Red) in July 2010. The channel was created after González purchased the VHF allocation, which had initially been sought by ESTV, a channel owned by Grupo Pellas that wanted to use the frequency but was ultimately blocked, leading it to rebrand as Vos TV on UHF Channel 14. It is believed that the sale was influenced by the election of Daniel Ortega in 2007 and the return of the FSLN to power. Additionally, through another figurehead company, Digital Media, González acquired a third frequency, Channel 9, previously used as a relayer for Canal 6. This acquisition prevented Canal 6 from utilizing its relayer upon its return in September 2011. The telecommunications and postal regulator, Telcor, allegedly "offered" the relayer to the figurehead company.

In 2015, González formally took over Televicentro through his figurehead company, TV Móvil. This takeover, combined with the firing of the TVNoticias team and the involvement of two of Ortega's sons—Laureano and Juan Carlos (the latter of whom manages TN8)—placed the channel under the management of Honduran Carlos Pastora. Although Pastora is a key figure at Ratensa, Televicentro operates independently, financed by both González and the Nicaraguan government.

== Assets ==
=== Radio ===
The group owns twelve radio stations.

Name	Frequency	Format
Radio Lite	107.1 FM	Oldies format, with music from the 60s to the 90s in Spanish.
Radio La Picosa	97.9 FM	Rancheras, cumbia, banda and Mexican regional music.
Radio Romántica	98.7 FM	Contemporary hit station, with hits from the 1970s onwards, in English and Spanish.
Radio RT	89.9 FM	Reguetón, dance hall, bachata, socca, hip hop, plena and trap in Spanish.
Radio Joya	103.9 FM	Oldies format in English, specialized in 60s to 90s music.
Radio Nova	100.7 FM	Playlist with announcers.
Radio Amante	96.3 FM	Pop, bachata, salsa, merengue, urban.
Radio Alfa	93.5 FM	Pop and ballads in Spanish.
Radio Suprema	106.3 FM	Rock & pop.
Radio La Pachanguera	95.1 FM	Urban-tropical.
Radio La Marka	90.9 FM	Electronic dance music, pop and hip-hop.
Radio La Buenisima	93.1 FM	Mexican pop.

=== Television ===
Corporación Ratensa owns four television channels.

Logo	Nombre del canal	Programación	Fundación	Canales VHF
	Canal 10	Ratensa's main channel.	1997	10 (Analog)
	Canal 2 (also known as Televicentro)	Channel with a similar (generalist) profile to Canal 10, as a separate operation from the main Ratensa group.	1965	2 (Analog)
	Canal 9	Tertiary channel.	2011	9 (Analog)
	Canal 11 (formerly TV Red)	Secondary channel.	2010	11 (Analog)
