= Margarita Pasos (TV host) =

Colombian Speaker

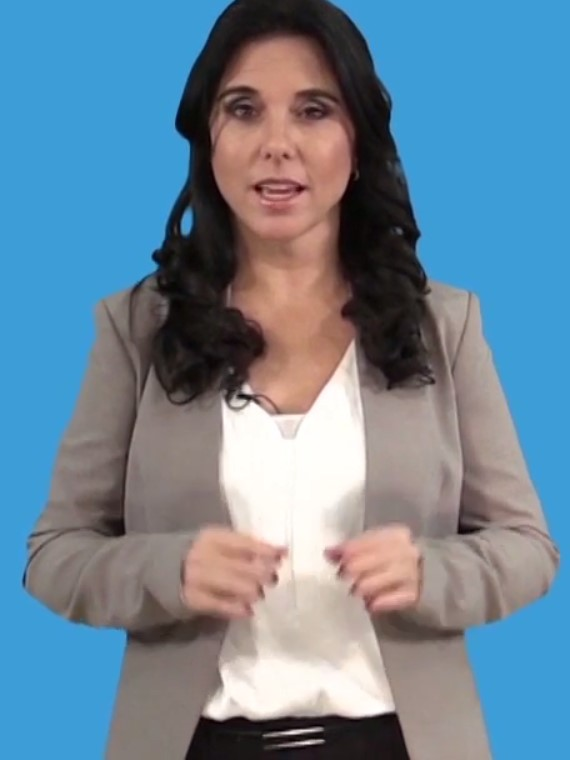
- Margarita Pasos in 2016
- Born: Margarita Pasos; December 28, 1972 (age 52); Medellín, Colombia
- Occupation(s): Speaker, journalist and motivational speaker
- Years active: 2001–present
- Website: https://www.pasosalexito.com/

Margarita Pasos (born December 28, 1972) is a Colombian speaker, journalist and motivational speaker.

== Career ==
Pasos was born in Medellín, Colombia. She later moved to Miami to finish her university studies. Later on Pasos moved to Nicaragua to pursue a career in television. In 2001, she hosted her talk show Margarita te voy a contar. Her talk show originally aired on Nicaraguan television, first on Canal 6, later moved to Canal 2 and finally on Canal 10, but it became syndicated and aired in the United States and the rest of Latin America. It ended in 2013 due to cost issues. Margarita te voy a contar started airing in the United States on La Familia Cosmovision in 2006.

After her show Margarita te voy a contar ended in 2013, she became a motivational speaker and worked with veteran motivational speaker Brian Tracy. In 2014, Pasos launched her own YouTube channel, where she promotes her motivational seminars and events, and in 2016, she gave a presentation for TED in Managua. Later in 2019, Pasos received an award from the Nicaraguan National Assembly for her efforts in promoting Nicaraguan culture through her talk show.

In recent years Pasos has returned to television. In 2019, she began appearing on Mega TV, where she provides motivational tips and counseling for the viewers. Then in 2020, she began making appearances on Un Nuevo Día, a morning show on Telemundo.
