= Canal 6 =

Canal 6 may refer to

- Canal 6 (Salvadoran TV channel) in El Salvador
- Canal 6 (Honduran TV channel) in Honduras
- Canal 6 (Nicaraguan TV channel) in Nicaragua
- Multimedios Television in Mexico, which also uses Canal 6 as a branding
- Repretel 6, Canal 6 in Costa Rica
