= Sistema Nacional de Televisión =

Sistema Nacional de Televisión may refer to:

- Sistema Nacional de Televisión (Paraguay)
- Sistema Nacional de Televisión (Nicaragua)
