= Ana Jurka =

Honduran journalist

- Born: 16 January 1985 (age 40); Tegucigalpa, Honduras
- Occupations: Journalist; TV Host; Sports Anchor
- Spouse: Joshua Jurka (m. 2011)

Ana Flores Jurka (born 16 January 1985) is a Honduran journalist. She is currently the host of the sports program Titulares Telemundo that airs on Telemundo.

== Personal life ==
Jurka was born and raised in Tegucigalpa, the capital of Honduras. She considers herself a fan of C.D. Olimpia in that city. In March 2011, she married US national Joshua Jurka. She is the aunt of footballer Rembrandt Flores.

== History ==
In 2004, Jurka began her professional career as a co-host on Sobre Ruedas, a program dedicated to the automotive world, on Canal 11 and Rock & Pop 92.3 FM. Then in 2007, she caught the attention of Canal 54 executives, who decided to hire her to be part of an opinion program on issues of politics, national and world events, general culture among others, from the youth point of view as one of the 4 presenters of Zona Joven. In 2008, always on Channel 54, Jurka also joined a new program to support national talent, as host of En La Mira, which had great acceptance and due to its popularity, the program changed its name and station to be seen nationally on Maya TV Channel 66 as Hecho en Casa. Due to her charisma, popularity and natural talent, the producers of the #1 youth program, Radicales on Canal 6, took Ana as a presenter in 2010, which would be her last work in entertainment at the Honduran level.

In 2012, Jurka decided to move to Orlando, Florida with her husband. Months later, she was hired by Telemundo Orlando as a news reporter. But as a Honduran, she would return to the world of entertainment, when given the opportunity to be a sports presenter. She is currently the presenter of Fútbol Estelar.
