= TVX =

TVX may refer to:

- TVX Broadcast Group, a defunct American media company
- Television X, a series of adult television channels in the UK
- TVX, a defunct Salvadoran television channel
- Thermal expansion valve
