= Canal 9 (Nicaraguan TV channel) =

Television station in Managua, Nicaragua

- Type: Free-to-air television network
- Country: Nicaragua

Programming
- Language: Spanish
- Picture format: 480i SDTV

Ownership
- Owner: Digital Media de Nicaragua (Grupo RATENSA through Albavisión)
- Sister channels: Canal 10; Canal 11

History
- Launched: 2011

Availability

Terrestrial
- Analog VHF: Channel 9

Canal 9 is a Nicaraguan terrestrial television channel broadcasting since 2011 from the city of Managua and owned by Digital Media de Nicaragua S.A., itself a part of the larger Grupo RATENSA, in turn owned by Albavisión.

== History ==
The VHF frequency was first used by Canal 6 in January 1980, shortly after the triumph of the Nicaraguan Revolution, under the control of Sistema Sandinista de Televisión, located in the Bluefields area.

The achievement of a supposed agreement between president Daniel Ortega and Mexican businessman Ángel González in 2007 for him to hand over Canal 4 practically free of charge, had led the telecommunications regulator (Telcor) to deliver a frequency that was assigned to be used exclusively by the State, which would offer public television. The frequency belonged to Canal 9, assigned to Digital Media de Nicaragua S.A., whose legal representative in 2011 was Alberto Leopoldo Mendoza D'Arcy.

Ángel González was behind its setup, who in just like most of his businesses, did not appear in his companies, using figureheads for them.

Canal 9 was supposed to be a relayer of Canal 6, the country's de facto public channel, but at the time of the deal (June 2011), the channel was still inoperational as it shut down during the Arnoldo Alemán Lacayo administration. Telcor handed over the frequency to Digital Media, forcing Canal 6 to stay without its relayer.
