= Pasos =

Pasos is a Spanish surname. Notable people with the surname include:

- Amaury Pasos (1935–2024), Brazilian basketball player and coach of Argentine origin
- Joaquín Pasos (1914–1947), Nicaraguan poet, narrator, and essayist
- Margarita Pasos (born 1965), Mexican sailor
- Margarita Pasos (TV host) (born 1972), Colombian Speaker, journalist and motivational speaker
