= Televicentro =

Televicentro may refer to the following:

- Televicentro 4, former name of WAPA-TV, a television station in Puerto Rico
- Televicentro (Honduras), a television station in Honduras
- Televicentro (Nicaraguan TV channel), a television station in Nicaragua
- Televicentro, a former name of Televisa Mexico
