= Canal 55 El Líder =

Nicaraguan TV channel

Canal 55 El Líder is a television channel from León, Nicaragua founded in December 2004. The station is owned by Grupo Pacífico, S.A. and covers León and Chinandega in the country's west.

== History ==
The channel stemmed from the November 2003 acquisition of Metro Cable by ESTESA. (Note: Although one source erroneously claims that the cable company was Telecable.) The local cable company had its own channel, Canal 28, but the acquisition led to its closure. In the previous year, in anticipation for such a move, Centeno applied for a UHF license at TELCOR on channel 55; said license was approved on 6 December 2004. As of December 2004, when the channel was conducting test transmissions, it had a budget of US$63,000; had a 250-watt transmitter and broadcast from 11:30am to 12am. On weekdays, it broadcast Hoy Mismo at 12pm, and on Saturdays at 7pm, Las tertulias leonesas, a variety show. The rest of the schedule consisted of cartoons, youth series and feature films. It also installed a mobile unit to carry out broadcast of sporting events from both León and Chinandega. On 13 January 2005, one of its journalists, Marvin Urbina, was physically assaulted by two staff from the Salman supermarket.

On 27 November 2009, the channel started airing Plan B.
