= List of television stations in Prince Edward Island =

This is a list of broadcast television stations serving cities in the Canadian province of Prince Edward Island.

| City of licence | Analog channel | Digital channel | Virtual channel | Callsign | Network | Notes |
|---|---|---|---|---|---|---|
| Charlottetown | | 8 | 8.1 | CKCW-DT-1 | CTV | Satellite of CKCW-DT Moncton, NB |
| Charlottetown | | 13 | 13.1 | CBCT-DT | CBC | |
| Charlottetown | | 25 | 42.1 | CIHF-DT-14 | Global | Satellite of CHNB-DT Saint John, NB |
| St. Edward | 5 | | | CKCW-TV-2 | CTV | Satellite of CKCW-DT Moncton, NB |

== See also ==
- List of television stations in Canada
- Lists of television stations in Atlantic Canada
- Media in Canada
