= Telecommunications in Nicaragua =

Telecommunications in Nicaragua include radio, television, fixed and mobile telephones, and the Internet.

== Radio and television ==
- Radio stations: More than 100 radio stations, nearly all privately owned; Radio Nicaragua is government-owned and Radio Sandino is controlled by the Sandinista National Liberation Front (FSLN) (2007).
- Radios: 1.24 million (1997).
- Television stations: Multiple privately owned terrestrial TV networks, supplemented by cable TV in most urban areas (2007).
- Television sets: 320,000 (1997).

=== Restrictions ===
The government restricts media freedom through harassment, censorship, arbitrary application of libel laws, and use of national security justifications. Private individuals also harass media for criticizing the government. President Ortega frequently uses a law that allows for government broadcasts of emergency messages to force national networks either to broadcast his speeches or to cease other programming temporarily during those times.

The government continues to close opposition radio stations and cancel opposition television programs, allegedly for political reasons. It also employs vandalism, the seizure of privately owned broadcast equipment, and criminal defamation charges against media outlet owners or program hosts to limit freedom and diversity of the press. Opposition news sources report that generally they were not permitted to enter official government events and are denied interviews by government officials.

In June 2012 the Nicaraguan Association for Human Rights (ANPDH) claimed that the Nicaraguan National Police (NNP) forcibly closed Somoto-based Television Channel 13 due to the station's reporting on government corruption. The owner of the station, Juan Carlos Pineda, claimed that NNP officials harassed and threatened him prior to the forced closure. There were no reports of an investigation, and at the end of 2012 the station remained closed.

The Communications Research Centre of Nicaragua (CINCO) reported that control over television media by the Sandinista National Liberation Front (FSLN) and President Ortega strengthened throughout 2012. National television was increasingly either controlled by FSLN supporters or directly owned and administered by President Ortega's family members. Eight of the nine basic channels available were under direct FSLN influence.

In general media outlets owned by the presidential family limited programming to progovernment or FSLN propaganda and campaign advertisements. Press and human rights organizations claimed that the use of state funds for official media placed opposition outlets at an unfair disadvantage.

Some journalists practice self-censorship, fearing economic and physical repercussions for investigative reporting on crime or official corruption.

== Telephones ==
- Calling code: +505
- International call prefix: 00
- Main lines: 320,000 lines in use, 112th in the world (2012).
- Mobile cellular: 5.3 million lines, 108th in the world (2012).
- Telephone system: System being upgraded by foreign investment; nearly all installed telecommunications capacity now uses digital technology, owing to investments since privatization of the formerly state-owned telecommunications company; since privatization, access to fixed-line and mobile-cellular services has improved; fixed-line teledensity roughly 5 per 100 persons; mobile-cellular telephone subscribership has increased to roughly 85 per 100 persons (2011).
- Satellite earth stations: 1 Intersputnik (Atlantic Ocean region) and 1 Intelsat (Atlantic Ocean) (2011).
- Communications cables: Americas Region Caribbean Ring System (ARCOS-1) fiber optic submarine cable provides connectivity to South and Central America, parts of the Caribbean, and the US (2011).

== Internet ==
- Top-level domain: .ni
- Internet users: 773,240 users, 121st in the world; 13.5% of the population, 159th in the world (2012).
- Fixed broadband: 95,023 subscriptions, 102nd in the world; 1.7% of the population, 131st in the world (2012).
- Wireless broadband: 58,365 subscriptions, 123rd in the world; 1.0% of the population, 133rd in the world (2012).
- Internet hosts: 296,068 hosts, 63rd in the world (2012).
- IPv4: 369,408 addresses allocated, less than 0.05% of the world total, 64.5 addresses per 1000 people (2012).
- Internet service providers: 5 ISPs (1999); cable internet in widespread use; DSL and WAP available in major cities.

=== Internet censorship and surveillance ===
There are no government restrictions to accessing the Internet or Internet chat rooms; however, several NGOs claim the government monitors their e-mail. Individuals and groups engage in the expression of views via the Internet, including by e-mail and social media.

The constitution upholds freedom of speech and press, but the government used administrative, judicial, and financial means to limit the exercise of these rights. Although the law provides that the right to information cannot be subjected to censorship, it also establishes retroactive liability, including criminal penalties for libel and slander.

During the November 2012 municipal elections, a popular Web site that allowed voters to register complaints or allegations of election fraud was apparently hacked on several occasions and forced to shut for significant portions of the day. Certain NGOs claimed the Web site was tampered with to prevent dissemination of voter complaints. During 2012 there were several reported cases of threats and violence against the press. On December 11, the spokesman of the Supreme Court of Justice publicly accused the online newsweekly Confidential of being financed by narcotics trafficking organizations, an allegation rights groups said was politically motivated.

== See also ==
- Media of Nicaragua
- National University of Engineering (Nicaragua), registrar for the .ni domain.
