= List of television stations in Nova Scotia =

This is a list of broadcast television stations serving cities in the Canadian province of Nova Scotia.

City of licence	Analog channel	Digital channel	Virtual channel	Callsign	Network	Notes
Antigonish	21			CIHF-TV-15	Global	
Antigonish	9			CJCB-TV-2	CTV	
Bay St. Lawrence	7			CJCB-TV-5	CTV	
Bridgetown	13			CJCH-TV-4	CTV	
Bridgewater	9			CIHF-TV-6	Global	
Caledonia	6			CJCH-TV-6	CTV	
Canning	10			CJCH-TV-1	CTV	
Chéticamp	36			CHNE-TV	Ind	
Dingwall	9			CJCB-TV-3	CTV	
Halifax		32	3.1	CBHT-DT	CBC	
Halifax		15	5.1	CJCH-DT	CTV	
Halifax		8	8.1 (HD); 8.2 (SD)	CIHF-DT	Global	
Inverness	6			CJCB-TV-1	CTV	
Isle Madame	36			CIMC-TV	Ind	
Marinette	23			CJCH-TV-8	CTV	
Mulgrave	28			CIHF-TV-16	Global	
New Glasgow	34			CIHF-TV-8	Global	
New Glasgow	9			CJCB-TV-2	CTV	used Antigonish transmitter
Port Hawkesbury	3			CJCB-TV-6	CTV	
Sheet Harbour	2			CJCH-TV-5	CTV	
Sydney	4			CJCB-TV	CTV	
Sydney	11			CIHF-TV-7	Global	
Truro	18			CIHF-TV-4	Global	
Truro	12			CJCH-TV-2	CTV	
Valley	12			CJCH-TV-3	CTV	
Wolfville	20			CIHF-TV-5	Global	
Yarmouth		45	45.1 (HD); 45.2 (SD)	CIHF-DT-10	Global	
Yarmouth	40			CJCH-TV-7	CTV	

== See also ==
- List of television stations in Canada
- Lists of television stations in Atlantic Canada
- Media in Canada
