= Channel 21 TV stations in Mexico =

The following television stations broadcast on digital channel 21 in Mexico:

- XHAPB-TDT in La Paz, Baja California Sur
- XHAPF-TDT in Acatlán de Pérez Figueroa, Oaxaca
- XHAPZ-TDT in Apatzingán, Michoacán
- XHBTB-TDT in Bahía Tortugas, Baja California Sur
- XHCCN-TDT in Cancún, Quintana Roo
- XHCDM-TDT in Mexico City
- XHCGJ-TDT in Ciudad Camargo, Chihuahua
- XHCHM-TDT in Ciudad Hidalgo, Michoacán
- XHCTAC-TDT in Acapulco, Guerrero
- XHCTMZ-TDT in Mazatlán, Sinaloa
- XHCTPU-TDT in Puebla, Puebla
- XHDI-TDT in Durango, Durango
- XHDR-TDT in Manzanillo, Colima
- XHDTV-TDT in Tecate, Baja California
- XHECH-TDT in Chihuahua, Chihuahua
- XHEFT-TDT in Escárcega, Campeche
- XHFEC-TDT in San Felipe, Baja California
- XHFET-TDT in San Fernando, Tamaulipas
- XHGPE-TDT in Pénjamo, Guanajuato
- XHGPV-TDT in Puerto Vallarta, Jalisco
- XHGTD-TDT in Tarandacuao, Guanajuato
- XHHN-TDT in Guaymas, Sonora
- XHIOC-TDT in Isla Socorro, Colima
- XHMJI-TDT in Jiquilpan de Juárez, Michoacán
- XHMST-TDT in Magdalena de Kino, Sonora
- XHPAH-TDT in Pachuca, Hidalgo
- XHPAO-TDT on Cerro Palma Sola, Oaxaca
- XHPPS-TDT in Puerto Peñasco, Sonora
- XHSAW-TDT in Sabinas Hidalgo, Nuevo León
- XHSDD-TDT in Sabinas, Coahuila
- XHSIM-TDT in Los Mochis, Sinaloa
- XHSIN-TDT in Culiacán, Sinaloa
- XHSIS-TDT in San Isidro, Baja California Sur
- XHSPRCO-TDT in Colima, Colima
- XHTAU-TDT in Tampico, Tamaulipas
- XHTAZ-TDT in Tamazunchale, San Luis Potosí
- XHTLO-TDT in Tlaxiaco, Oaxaca
- XHVBM-TDT in Valle de Bravo, México
