= Bayardo Gutiérrez =

Nicaraguan animator and musician

- Born: 7 September 1986; Acoyapa, Nicaragua
- Died: 1 July 2024 (aged 37); Managua, Nicaragua
- Occupation: Animator
- Parents: Bayardo Gutiérrez Núñez (father); Mayela Minar Cuadra Caldera (mother)

Bayardo Roberto Gutiérrez Cuadra (Acoyapa, 7 September 1986–Managua, 1 July 2024) was a Nicaraguan musician and animator. He was best known under his alter ego Perro Blanko, which was the main character of a Flash-animated series he produced, Flash Metal, that he released on YouTube. From 2011 to 2024, he was an animator and designer at Viva Nicaragua; Flash Metal/Perro Blanko also aired on the channel.

== Biography ==
Gutiérrez was born in Acoyapa on 7 September 1986 to Bayardo Gutiérrez Núñez and Mayela Minar Cuadra Caldera. In his youth, he studied Philology and Communication at the National Autonomous University of Nicaragua, but dropped out of the course. To sustain himself, he worked as a construction worker, house painter, among other jobs.

At age 13, he started to disobey his parents. During the 2000s, Cuadra learned how to draw and animated on his own, after coming home with his hands exhausted from his construction job, or full of paint. He later got his own computer, which he obtained from a loan. His interest in drawing stemmed from "two decades growing in intolerance, humiliation, contempt among other things". When he was already drawing, his sister had already left home because she wasn't bringing in money, he moved to Managua to continue working, where he received several requests from TN8 to show his talent, but these initial results became inconclusive.

It was Maurice Ortega Murillo, one of the children of Daniel Ortega, through his company RGB Media, that discovered Gutiérrez's work and gave him a chance to work professionally. He was employed by the state channel Viva Nicaragua, where he produced graphics. In 2014, he returned to Acoyapa since his mother Mayela was facing a terminal disease.

== Death ==
Gutiérrez died on 1 July 2024 according to Viva Nicaragua, the channel where he worked at. The cause of death was not disclosed, but he was severely ill at the time.

== Flash Metal ==
Flash Metal was Gutiérrez's animated series. It, and its main character Perro Blanko, were created when he was still in Acoyapa, where he sketched an "episode 0". Each of the characters was based on typical characteristics of Nicaraguans. Since Gutiérrez did not like criticism of personalities as means of humor, Daniel Ortega and Rosario Murillo were omitted at his own will. The series was halted in 2014, when he returned to Acoyapa. Viva Nicaragua aired the series during its run.

Characters included Perro Blanko, Flaco, Pom, Mierdoso, Lucrecia, el Ojo (The Eye) and El viejo Oldman (Old Man Oldman). Until the hiatus, over thirty episodes were produced.
