= Law enforcement in Nicaragua =

Law enforcement in Nicaragua falls under the jurisdiction of La Policia Nacional of Nicaragua. They are in charge of regular police functions and sometimes work in conjunction with the Nicaraguan military, making it an indirect and rather subtle version of a gendarmerie.

The Nicaraguan National Police work separately and have a different established set of norms than the nation's military.

== Historical secret police organizations ==
- Dirección General de Seguridad del Estado (DGSE) (Directorate-General of State Security)

== See also ==
- Nicaraguan National Police
- National Guard of Nicaragua

== Sources ==
1. World Police Encyclopedia, ed. by Dilip K. Das & Michael Palmiotto. by Taylor & Francis. 2004,
2. World Encyclopedia of Police Forces and Correctional Systems, 2nd. edition, Gale., 2006. ISBN 978-0-7876-7738-1.
3. Sullivan, Larry E. et al. Encyclopedia of Law Enforcement. Thousand Oaks: Sage Publications, 2005.
