= List of Nunavut television transmitters =

City of licence	Channel	Callsign	Network	Notes
Arctic Bay	5	CH2912		
Arctic Bay	11	CH4196	APTN	
Arctic Bay	12	CH4584	CBC North	
Arviat	7	CH4158	APTN	
Baker Lake	12	CH4156	APTN	
Cambridge Bay	13	CH2550	APTN	
Cape Dorset	12	CH4157	APTN	
Chesterfield Inlet	6	CH4213	APTN	
Clyde River	6	CH4172	APTN	
Clyde River	9	CH2290		
Clyde River	12	CH2291	CBC North	
Coral Harbour	4	CH4197	APTN	
Gjoa Haven	13	CH2552	APTN	
Hall Beach	12	CH4214	APTN	
Igloolik	12	CH4201	APTN	
Iqaluit	10	CH4161	APTN	
Iqaluit	12	CH2260	SRC	
Kimmirut	6	CH4198	APTN	
Kugaaruk	13	CH2554	APTN	
Kugluktuk	7	CH4410	TSN	
Nanisivik	11	CH4178	APTN	
Pangnirtung	12	CH4162	APTN	
Pond Inlet	12	CH4163	APTN	
Rankin Inlet	12	CH4265	APTN	
Resolute	12	CH4208	APTN	
Sanikiluaq	12	CH4217	APTN	
Taloyoak	13	CH2555	APTN	
Whale Cove	10	CH4219	APTN	
Whale Cove	12	CH2334	CBC North	

== See also ==
- Media in Canada
