= Channel 21 TV stations in Canada =

The following television stations broadcast on digital or analog channel 21 in Canada:

- CBMT-DT in Montreal, Quebec
- CBRT-DT in Calgary, Alberta
- CHNB-TV-12 in St. Stephen, New Brunswick
- CHNU-DT-1 in Victoria, British Columbia
- CIHF-TV-15 in Antigonish, Nova Scotia
- CJON-DT in St. John's, Newfoundland and Labrador
- CJWM-TV in Whistler, British Columbia
- CKRT-DT-4 in Cabano, Quebec
