= List of Northwest Territories television transmitters =

City of licence	Channel	Callsign	Network	Notes
Fort Good Hope	12	CH4200	APTN	
Fort McPherson	10	CH4205	APTN	
Fort Providence	16	CH2890		
Fort Providence	26	CH2895	TSN	
Fort Providence	28	CH2896	MuchMusic	
Fort Simpson	14	CH4202	APTN	
Fort Smith	6	CH4150		
Fort Smith	10	CH4206	APTN	
Gamèti	4	CH4294		
Gamèti	12	CH4215	APTN	
Hay River	2	CH4434	TSN	
Hay River	5	CIHC-TV	Community Channel	
Hay River	8	CH4435	SRC	
Hay River	9	CH4436	Knowledge	
Hay River	12	CH4160	APTN	
Hay River	16	CH4547	Family Channel	
Inuvik	13	CH4221	APTN	
Kakisa	12	CH2590	CBC North	
Norman Wells	3	CHWB		
Norman Wells	6	CH2018	TSN	
Norman Wells	12	CH4220	APTN	
Ulukhaktok	13	CH2553	APTN	
Whatì	6	CH4496	TSN	
Wrigley	9	CH2329	CBC North	
Yellowknife	8.1	CFYK-DT	CBC North	Digital
Yellowknife	11	CHTY-TV	APTN	
Yellowknife	13	CH4127	SRC	

== See also ==
- Media in Canada
