= Magic Channel =

Magic Channel (channel 17 on UHF and channel 78 on ESTESA's cable-TV system) is a nationwide terrestrial music television channel from Nicaragua owned by GR Enterprise from Miami, and Magic Broadcasting System, property of Nicaraguan radio entrepreneur Arnoldo Ríos. The channel was founded in 2002, after a change to the structure of Cadena Mágica, and one of the plans was the setup of a UHF channel.
