= Envío =

Nicaraguan magazine

Envío (or Revista Envío; Envío Magazine) is a Nicaragua-based magazine founded in 1981 and published by the Jesuit Universidad Centroamericana in Managua. Initially defining its role as focused on Nicaraguan affairs, particularly "critical support" of the projects of the Sandinista movement and of liberation theology, the magazine expanded in the 1990s to cover Central America and the Caribbean region as a whole, along with international sociopolitical themes. The Serials Directory describes the magazine's coverage as "[a]nalysis on the Central American region. For concerned citizens and scholars alike, provides analytical articles, documents, interviews and news stories on the politics and economics of Nicaragua and Central America."

In addition to the Spanish-language edition, the magazine has been published in English from its inception and in Italian since 1994, with the latter edition being published in Italy. Since 2003, the magazine's website also has offered a free archive of all articles going back to 1981.
