= List of Yukon television transmitters =

Television transmitters in Yukon, Canada include those licensed to five communities, carrying Knowledge, APTN, CBC North, or a community channel.

== List ==
City of license	Channel	Callsign	Network	Notes
Dawson City	2	CH2003	Knowledge	
Dawson City	9	CH4261	APTN	
Teslin	6	CFTS-TV	Community Channel	
Upper Liard	9	CH2986	CBC North	
Upper Liard	11	CH4167	APTN	
Watson Lake	5	CH4169	APTN	
Whitehorse	11	CHWT-TV	APTN	

== See also ==
- Media in Canada
