= SER (magazine) =

- Editor: Raquel López
- Categories: Lifestyle and Fashion
- Frequency: Monthly
- Founded: 2002; 23 years ago
- Company: MADERA & Co.
- Country: Nicaragua
- Language: Spanish
- Website: serenlinea.com

SER is a Nicaraguan magazine of fashion and lifestyle. It is a monthly publication and is directed mainly to women. It is published by MADERA & Co., conformed by three sisters: Margina, Denise and Raquel López.

== History and profile ==
Its first issue was published in September 2002. Back then, this name was an acronym for "Senses, Essences and Realities", alluding to the issues that were illustrated in the magazine. Then it was shortened with the letters to simply name SER ("TO BE").

SER is known to reflect images of fashion, high society events and interviews with leading personalities in Nicaragua and internationally, as the Nicaraguan Bianca Jagger, singer Hernaldo Zúñiga, the Puerto Rican Olga Tañón, among others. It is characterized by the use of Nicaraguan women on the cover. Only once, in 2004, did a man appear. It was Peter Nolet, a supermodel from New Zealand who conducted several advertising campaigns for renowned brands such as Giorgio Armani, Salvatore Ferragamo, Hugo Boss, Burberry and Ralph Lauren.
