= La Hora Nacional =

Mexican national government radio program

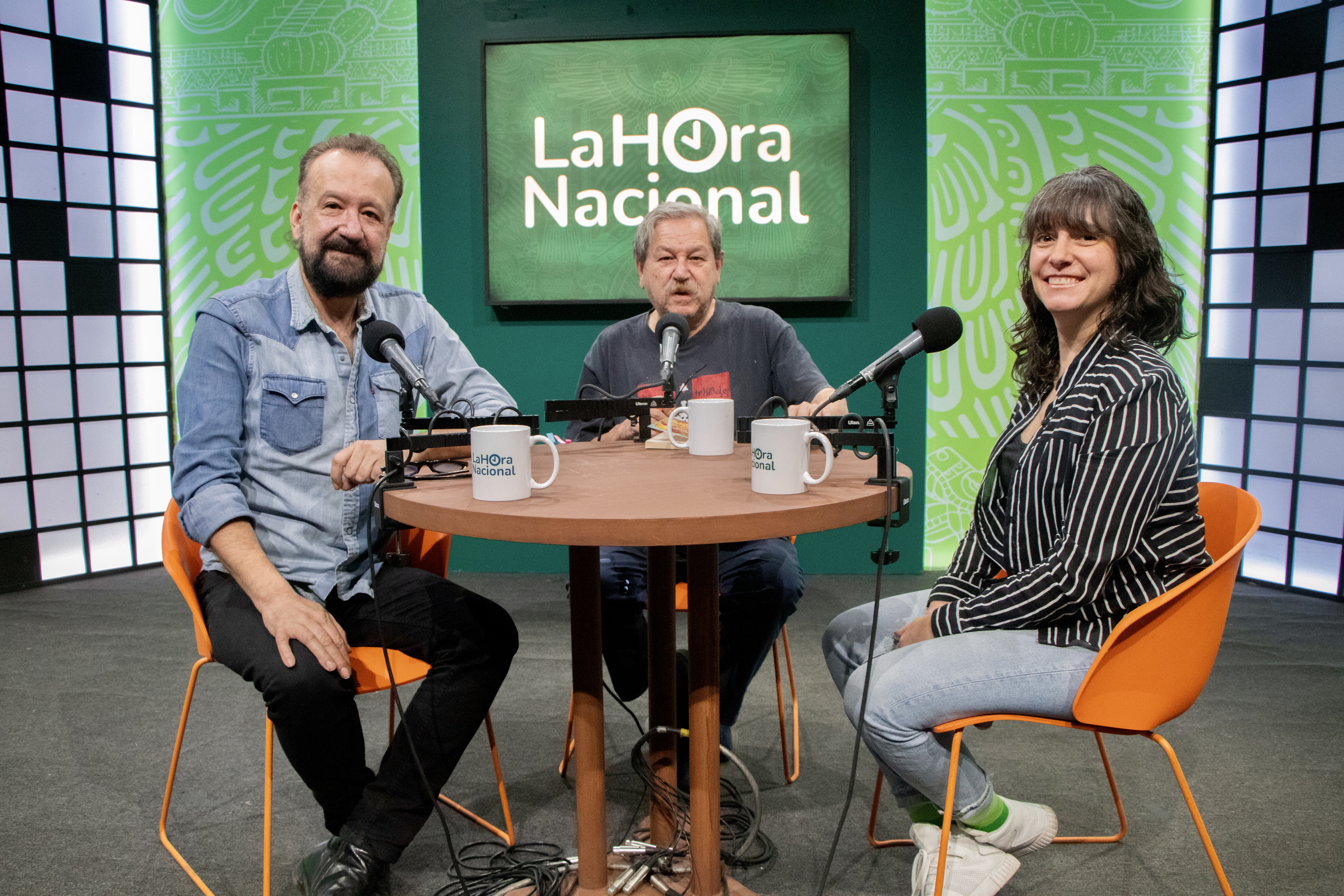
- Genre: Informational/government
- Running time: 60 minutes (10:00 pm – 11:00 pm)
- Country of origin: México
- Original release: July 25, 1937
- Website: lahoranacional.gob.mx

La Hora Nacional (The National Hour) is a radio program produced by the General Directorate of Radio, Television and Film (RTC) of the Mexican Secretariat of the Interior. The one-hour program airs at 10 p.m. local time on Sundays on all Mexican radio stations, as required by the Federal Telecommunications Institute (IFT)'s regulations.

== History ==
La Hora Nacional debuted on July 25, 1937, when it aired on station XEDT, then the station of the presidential Autonomous Department of Press and Propaganda. Alonso Sordo Noriega, who would go on to found XEX-AM, was the first host of the program. The vision of the hour-long program was to create a link between the federal government with Mexican society and foster national formation. La Hora Nacional emerged during a decade when the Mexican government under Lázaro Cárdenas further entered the medium of broadcasting.

Programming on La Hora Nacional has varied widely throughout its history, including classical music, popular music and live remotes from various locations in Mexico; it has also tended to change significantly in accord with larger political changes. In the 1950s, La Hora Nacional emphasized Mexican music and dedicated entire programs to different Mexican states. In the 1960s, La Hora Nacional became more of a radio magazine program, with dramatizations of historical events. Later decades would add cultural and sport sections, poetry, interviews, and segments that summarized the activities of the President of Mexico.

For 30 years, La Hora Nacional was broadcast live.

On July 26, 1987, La Hora Nacional celebrated its 50th anniversary with a radical change in format. Previously the entire hour program was originated from the RTC in Mexico City. However, from 1987 onward, the second half of the program would be produced by each of the states and broadcast within each state. Currently, 26 of the 32 Mexican federative entities produce their own half-hours; stations in Baja California, Baja California Sur, Campeche, Oaxaca, Tabasco and Tamaulipas air a second "complementary" half-hour produced by the RTC, as those states do not originate opt-outs.

The name of the program has changed throughout its history. At one point, it was known as the Army-Navy Hour; at another, it was the Weekly National Magazine.

== See also ==
- A Voz do Brasil, a similar program in Brazil
