= Economic history of Nicaragua =

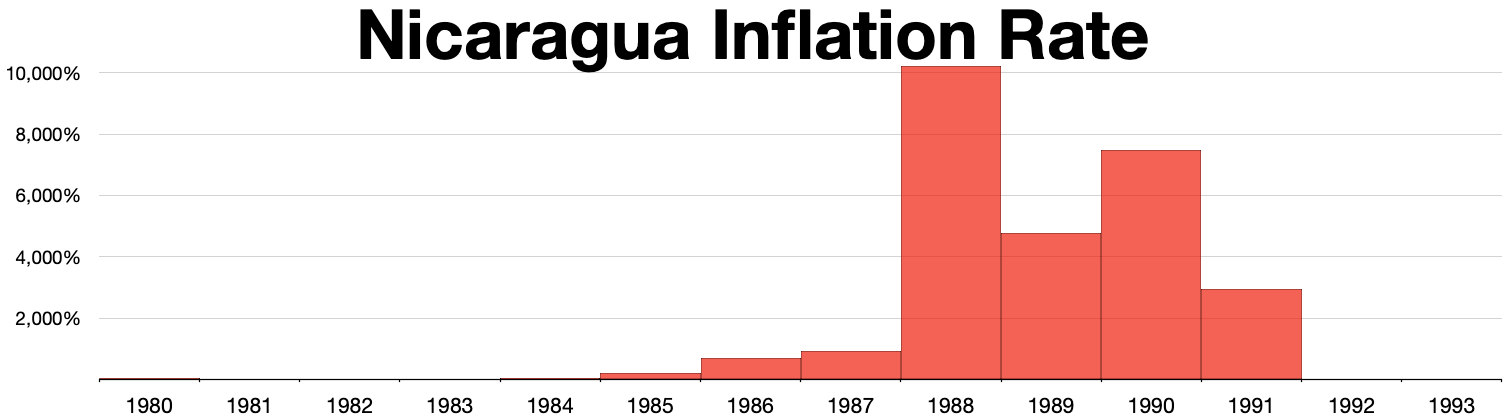
Nicaragua inflation rate 1980-1993

Nicaragua's economic history has shifted from concentration in gold, beef, and coffee to a mixed economy under the Sandinista government to an International Monetary Fund policy attempt in 1990.

Pre-Columbian Nicaragua had a well-developed agrarian society. European diseases and forced work in gold mines decimated the native population. Most tilled land reverted to jungle. Beef, hides, and tallow were the colony's principal exports. Commercial coffee growing began in the 1840s, expanding to resemble a banana republic at the end of the 19th century. After World War II, the economy diversified, with new crops and industrialization. In the 1960s, the Central American Common Market and import substitution industrialization stimulated the economy. The 1972 earthquake destroyed much of Nicaragua's industrial infrastructure. Reconstruction led to high foreign indebtedness, with the benefits concentrated in a few hands, especially the Somoza family.

The Sandinista government was determined to make workers and peasants the prime beneficiaries. All land belonging to the Somozas was confiscated, though private property continued in a mixed economy. Restructuring and rebuilding caused initial growth, but GDP dropped from 1984 to 1990. Between decreasing revenues, mushrooming military expenditures, and printing large amounts of paper money, inflation peaked at 14,000% annually in 1987. In early 1988, the Daniel Ortega administration established austerity with price controls and a new currency. Then the government spent massively to repair Hurricane Joan damage. A US embargo also hindered economic development. In 1990, most Nicaraguans were considerably poorer than in the 1970s.

The Chamorro administration embraced International Monetary Fund and World Bank policy with the Mayoraga Plan. The plan aimed to halt spiraling inflation, lower the fiscal deficit, reduce the public sector and military work force, reduce social spending, attract foreign investment, and encourage exports. Loss of jobs and higher prices resulted in crippling public and private-sector strikes. By the end of 1990, most free market reforms were abandoned. A severe drought in 1992 decimated the principal export crops and a tsunami left thousands homeless. Foreign aid and investment had not returned in significant amounts.

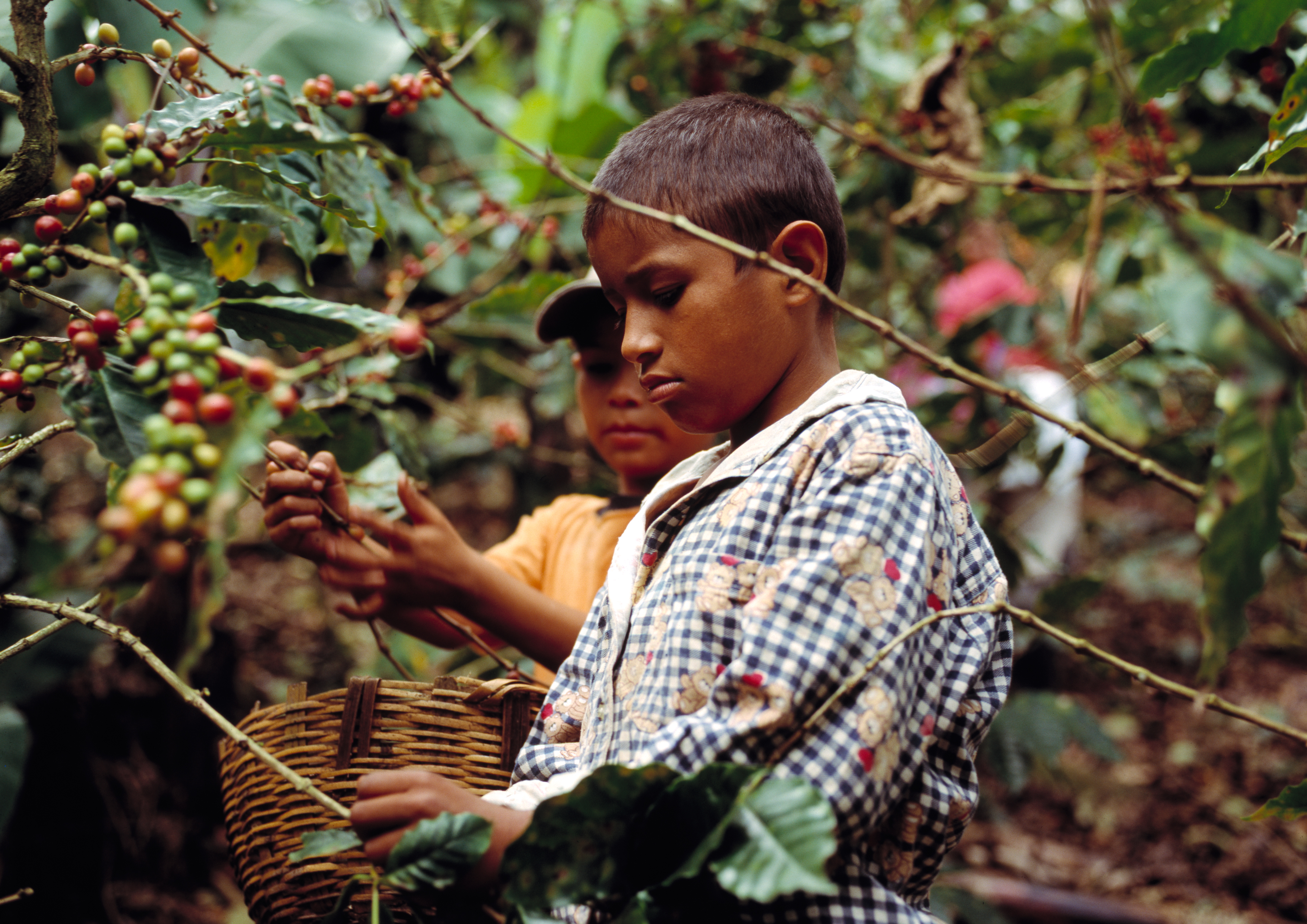
Nicaraguan children working on a Coffee plantation in 2006

== Pre-Columbian and colonial era ==
The first Spanish explorers of Nicaragua found a well-developed agrarian society in the central highlands and Pacific lowlands. The rich volcanic soils produced a wide array of products, including beans, peppers, corn, cocoa, and cassava (manioc). Agricultural land was held communally, and each community had a central marketplace for trading and distributing food.

The arrival of the Spanish in the early 16th century destroyed, for all intents and purposes, the indigenous agricultural system. The early conquistadors were interested primarily in gold; European diseases and forced work in the gold mines decimated the native population. Some small areas continued to be cultivated at the end of the 16th century, but most previously tilled land reverted to jungle. By the early 17th century, cattle raising, along with small areas of corn and cocoa cultivation and forestry, had become the primary function of Nicaragua's land. Beef, hides, and tallow were the colony's principal exports for the next two and a half centuries.

== The coffee boom, 1840s–1940s ==
Coffee was the product that would change Nicaragua's economy. Coffee was first grown domestically as a curiosity in the early 19th century. In the late 1840s, however, as coffee's popularity grew in North America and Europe, commercial coffee growing began in the area around Managua. By the early 1850s, passengers crossing Nicaragua en route to California were served large quantities of Nicaraguan coffee. The Central American coffee boom was in full swing in Nicaragua by the 1870s, and large areas in western Nicaragua were cleared and planted with coffee trees.

Unlike traditional cattle raising or subsistence farming, coffee production required significant capital and large pools of labor. Laws were therefore passed to encourage foreign investment and allow easy acquisition of land. The Subsidy Laws of 1879 and 1889 gave planters with large holdings a subsidy of US$0.05 per tree.

By the end of the 19th century, the entire economy came to resemble what is often referred to as a "banana republic" economy—one controlled by foreign interests and a small domestic elite oriented toward the production of a single agriculture export. Profits from coffee production flowed abroad or to the small number of landowners. Taxes on coffee were virtually nonexistent. The economy was also hostage to fluctuations in the price of coffee on the world markets—wide swings in coffee prices meant boom or bust years in Nicaragua. The Great Depression, coupled with poor harvests in 1931–1932, adversely affected Nicaragua's coffee sector. Nicaragua had the lowest income per capita in Central America and the second-lowest income per capita in Latin America. The eastern provinces of Nicaragua were unconnected to the capital by road or rail.

In 1912, Nicaragua was occupied by U.S. marines. The country lost its political independence. The US became primarily responsible for fiscal and monetary policy in Nicaragua.

== Diversification and growth, 1945–77 ==
The period after World War II was a time of economic diversification. The government brought in foreign technocrats to give advice on increasing production of new crops; hectarage in bananas and sugarcane increased, livestock herds grew, and cotton became a new export crop. The demand for cotton during the Korean War (1950–53) caused a rapid increase in cotton production, and by the mid-1950s, cotton was the nation's second largest export earner, after coffee.

Economic growth continued in the 1960s, largely as a result of industrialization. Under the stimulus of the newly formed Central American Common Market, Nicaragua achieved a certain degree of specialization in processed foods, chemicals, and metal manufacturing. By the end of the 1960s, however, import substitution industrialization as a stimulus for economic growth had been exhausted.

The 1969 Football War between Honduras and El Salvador, two members of the CACM, effectively suspended attempts at regional integration until 1987, when the Esquipulas II agreement was signed. By 1970 the industrial sector was undergoing little additional import substitution, and the collapse of the CACM meant that Nicaragua's economic growth, which had come from the expanding manufacturing sector, halted. Furthermore, the manufacturing firms that had developed under the tariff protection of the CACM were generally high-cost and inefficient; consequently, they were at a disadvantage when exporting outside the region.

Although statistics for the period 1970–77 seemed to show continued economic growth, they reflected fluctuations in demand rather than a continued diversification of the economy. The gross domestic product rose 13% in 1974, the biggest boom in Nicaragua's economic history. However, these figures largely represented the jump in construction as the country struggled to rebuild after the disastrous 1972 earthquake. Likewise, the positive growth in 1976–77 was merely a reflection of the high world prices for coffee and cotton.

Positive GDP growth rates in the 1970s masked growing structural problems in the economy. The 1972 earthquake destroyed much of Nicaragua's industrial infrastructure, which had been located in Managua. An estimated 10,000 people were killed and 30,000 injured, most of them in the capital area. The earthquake destroyed most government offices, the financial district of Managua, and about 2,500 small shops engaged in manufacturing and commercial activities. About 90% of city housing in Managua was left unstable.

Government budget deficits and inflation were the legacies of the earthquake. The government increased expenses to finance rebuilding, which primarily benefited the construction industry, in which the Somoza family had strong financial interests. Because earthquake reconstruction generated few new revenues, except through borrowing, most of the resulting public deficits were covered by foreign loans. In the late 1970s, Nicaragua had the highest level of foreign indebtedness in Central America.

Most of the benefits of the three decades of growth after World War II were concentrated in a few hands. Several groups of influential firms and families, most notably the Somoza family, controlled most of the nation's production. The Banamérica Group, an offshoot of the conservative elite of Granada, had powerful interests in sugar, rum, cattle, coffee, and retailing. The Banic Group, so-called because of its ties to the Nicaraguan Bank of Industry and Commerce (Banco Nicaragüense de Industria y Comercio-Banic), had its roots in the liberal families of León and had ties to the cotton, coffee, beer, lumber, construction, and fishing industries.

The third interest controlling the nation's production was the Somoza family, which had wide holdings in almost every segment of Nicaraguan society. Financial dealings for the Somozas were handled by the Central Bank of Nicaragua, which the Somozas treated as if it were a commercial bank. The Central Bank made frequent personal loans to the Somozas, which often went unpaid. Although the other financial groups used financial means primarily to further their interests, the Somozas protected their financial interests by controlling the government and its institutions.

The Somoza family owned an estimated 10% to 20% of the country's arable land, was heavily involved in the food processing industry, and controlled import-export licenses. The Somozas also controlled the transportation industry by owning outright, or at least having controlling interest in, the country's main seaports, the national airline, and Nicaragua's maritime fleet. Much of the profit from these enterprises was then reinvested in real estate holdings throughout the United States and Latin America. Some analysts estimated that by the mid-1970s, the Somozas owned or controlled 60% of the nation's economic activity. When Anastasio Somoza Debayle (president, 1967–72, 1974–79) fled Nicaragua in 1979, the family's worth was estimated to be between US$500 million and US$1.5 billion.

== Sandinista Revolution, 1977–79 ==
By the mid-1970s, the government's economic and dictatorial political policies had alienated nearly all sectors of society. Armed opposition to the Somoza regimes, which had started as a small rural insurrection in the early 1960s, had grown by 1977 to a full-scale civil war. The fighting caused foreign investment to drop sharply and the private sector to cut investment plans.

Much of the government expenditure was shifted to the military budget. As fighting in the cities increased, destruction and looting caused a large loss in inventories and operating stock. Foreign investment, which before 1977 had been a significant factor in the economy's growth, almost stopped. As the fighting intensified further, most liquid assets flowed out of the country.

Although the anti-Somoza forces finally won their struggle in July 1979, the human and physical cost of the revolution was tremendous. As many as 50,000 people lost their lives in the fighting, 100,000 were wounded, and 40,000 children were left orphans. About US$500 million in physical plants, equipment, and materials was destroyed; housing, hospitals, transportation, and communications incurred damage of US$80 million. The GDP shrank an estimated 25% in 1979 alone.

== Sandinista era, 1979–90 ==
The new government, formed in 1979 and dominated by the Sandinistas, resulted in a new model of economic development. The new leadership was conscious of the social inequities produced during the previous thirty years of unrestricted economic growth and was determined to make the country's workers and peasants, the "economically underprivileged," the prime beneficiaries of the new society. Consequently, in 1980 and 1981, unbridled incentives to private investment gave way to institutions designed to redistribute wealth and income. Private property would continue to be allowed, but all land belonging to the Somozas was confiscated.

The ideology of the Sandinistas put the future of the private sector and of private ownership of the means of production in doubt. Even though under the new government both public and private ownership were accepted, government spokespersons occasionally referred to a reconstruction phase in the country's development, in which property owners and the professional class would be tapped for their managerial and technical expertise. After reconstruction and recovery, the private sector would give way to expanded public ownership in most areas of the economy. Despite such ideas, which represented the point of view of a faction of the government, the Sandinista government remained officially committed to a mixed economy.

Economic growth was uneven in the 1980s. Restructuring of the economy and the rebuilding immediately following the end of the civil war caused the GDP to jump about 5% in 1980 and 1981. Each year from 1984 to 1990, however, showed a drop in the GDP.

After 1985 the government chose to fill the gap between decreasing revenues and mushrooming military expenditures by printing large amounts of paper money. Inflation skyrocketed, peaking in 1987 at more than 14,000% annually.

Measures taken by the government to lower inflation were largely wiped out by natural disaster. In early 1988, the administration of Daniel Ortega (Sandinista junta coordinator 1979–85, president 1985–90) established an austerity program to lower inflation. Price controls were tightened, and a new currency was introduced. As a result, by August 1988, inflation had dropped to an annual rate of 240%. The following month, however, Hurricane Joan cut a devastating path directly across the center of the country. Damage was extensive, and the government's program of massive spending to repair the infrastructure destroyed its anti-inflation measures.

In its eleven years in power, the Sandinista government never overcame most of the economic inequalities that it inherited from the Somoza era. Years of war, policy missteps due to inexperience, natural disasters, and the effects of the United States trade embargo all hindered economic development. The early economic gains of the Sandinistas were wiped out by seven years of sometimes precipitous economic decline, and in 1990, by most standards, Nicaragua and most Nicaraguans were considerably poorer than they were in the 1970s.

== Chamorro era, 1990–96 ==
The economic policies of Violeta Barrios de Chamorro (president, 1990–1997) were a radical change from those of the previous administration. The president proposed to revitalize the economy by reactivating the private sector and stimulating the export of agricultural products. However, the administration's political base was shaky. The president's political coalition, the National Opposition Union (Unión Nacional Oppositora-UNO), was a group of fourteen parties ranging from the far right to the far left. Furthermore, 43% of the voting electorate had voted for the Sandinistas, reflecting support for the overall goals of the former administration although not necessarily the results.

The Chamorro government's initial economic package embraced a standard International Monetary Fund and World Bank set of policy prescriptions. The IMF demands included instituting measures aimed at halting spiraling inflation; lowering the fiscal deficit by downsizing the public sector work force and the military, and reducing spending for social programs; stabilizing the national currency; attracting foreign investment; and encouraging exports. This course was an economic path mostly untraveled by Nicaragua, still heavily dependent on traditional agro-industrial exports, exploitation of natural resources, and continued foreign assistance.

Inspired by the IMF, Minister of Finance Francisco Mayoraga quickly put together an economic "Plan of 100 Days". This plan, also called the "Mayoraga Plan", cut the deficit and helped to lower inflation. Loss of jobs and higher prices under the plan, however, also resulted in crippling public and private-sector strikes throughout the country. Mayoraga's tenure in office barely exceeded the 100 days of his economic plan. By the end of 1990, the government was forced to abandon most of its freemarket reforms.

A series of political problems and natural disasters continued to plague the economy in 1991 and 1992. The need to accommodate left and right-wing views within its ruling coalition and attempts to work with the Sandinista opposition effectively prevented the implementation of unpopular economic measures. The government was unable to lower government expenditures or to hold the value of the newly introduced gold córdoba stable against the United States dollar. A severe drought in 1992 decimated the principal export crops. In September 1992, a destructive tsunami struck western Nicaragua, leaving thousands homeless. Furthermore, foreign aid and investment, on which the Nicaraguan economy had depended heavily for growth in the years preceding the Sandinista administration, never returned in significant amounts.

== See also ==
- Economy of Nicaragua

== Bibliography ==
- Merrill, Tim, ed. (1994). Nicaragua: a country study (3rd ed.). Washington, D.C.: Federal Research Division, Library of Congress. ISBN 0-8444-0831-X. OCLC 30623751. This article incorporates text from this source, which is in the public domain.
