= Radio Nicaragua =

- Managua; Nicaragua
- Frequencies: 90.5 FM, 620 AM

Programming
- Language: Spanish

History
- First air date: 1961

Links
- Website: radionicaragua.com.ni

Radio Nicaragua is the official state radio broadcaster of Nicaragua.

== History and management ==
Radio Nicaragua was founded in 1961. The station is fully owned by the Nicaraguan government and financed from the state budget.

In 1997, the station was occupied by students demanding increased education funding. During the 2018 Nicaraguan protests, its headquarters were set on fire.

== Content ==
Radio Nicaragua's content is controlled by the state, to the point where the station describes its purpose as disseminating "the activities, programmes and achievements of the Good Government".
