= TVX (Salvadoran TV channel) =

Defunct Salvadoran television channel

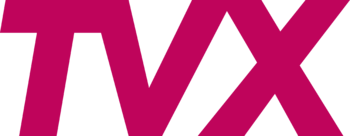
- Country: El Salvador
- Broadcast area: El Salvador
- Headquarters: 83 Avenida Norte, #619, Colonia Escalón, San Salvador, El Salvador

Programming
- Language: Spanish
- Picture format: 1080i HDTV (downscaled to 16:9 480i for the SDTV feed)

History
- Launched: November 5, 2012
- Closed: May 1, 2025 (12 years, 177 days)
- Former names: YSXY 23 (1989-2007); Star Channel (El Salvador) (2007-2012)

Links
- Website: www.tvx.com.sv

TVX was a Salvadoran subscription television channel operated by Master Communications through Channel 23 of El Salvador that was founded in 1989, after it was replaced by Star Channel in April 2007. The channel was founded by Oscar Berrios on 5 November 2012, and left the air on December 13, 2018, replaced by Tele1, serving only on cable television channel.

== History ==
It was inaugurated in 1989, as a new proposal for a Salvadoran channel. The creation of the channel is due to a study done to Salvadoran youth by private companies, where they discover their predilection for musical programs, especially in which video clips are presented. From here comes the first musical channel in the country. From March to May 1994, it initiates the test transmissions and in June of the same year its formal transmissions began.

In 2007, Channel 23 was replaced by Star Channel that aired music videos, and sometimes put programs related to music.

After Star Channel, it was replaced by the current TVX, beginning broadcasts on 5 November 2012, and since then it transmits own programming, such as newscasts, reports and opinion programs. It also broadcasts alternative programming, such as series and films by national and Latin American producers, and at the end of that same year it reinforced its programming with anime series and films and, in lesser number, US programs. In 2015 it decided to go to cable on a permanent basis, leaving channel 23 as the national feed, until Tele1 replaced the TV station feed on December 14, 2018.

Under Bukele, the channel was owned by Starlight, a company with connections to ALBA company Inverval.

Over time, as a cable channel, its programming began to decay. Chinese drama series, documentaries and cartoons started taking more time on air, while the anime series continued airing with expired rights and missing or skipped episodes, to an extent where the channel had to resort to internet copies. In 2022, the channel premiered Dragon Ball GT without an official license, followed by the first Dragon Ball series in 2023 and all seasons of Sailor Moon in 2024. Despite these changes, it lost its Twitch stream twice in 2024 before disabling its stream completely, forcing its news output to be posted on YouTube and Facebook.

On April 24, 2025, it was announced that TVX would cease transmissions on May 1 due to financial problems. Encuentro con Julio Villagrán moved to digital platforms.

== Logos ==
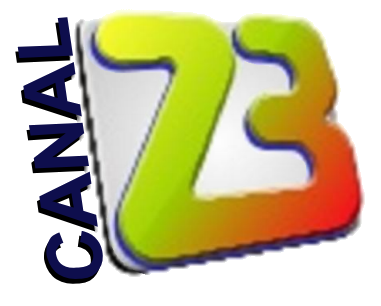
Canal 23 Logo.

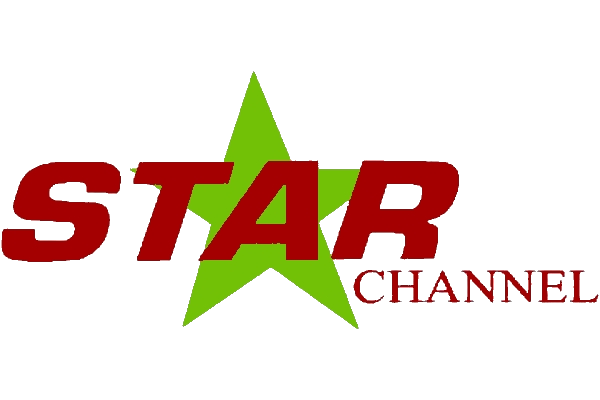
Star Channel (El Salvador) logo.
