= Sistema Nacional de Televisión (Nicaragua) =

Nicaraguan television network

The National Television System (Sistema Nacional de Televisión - SNTV) was a television network in Nicaragua, owned and operated by the government from 1990 to 1997.

With Violeta Chamorro's triumph in the 1990 elections, Canal 6 (then part of the Sandinista Television System) became the new National Television System. In 1997 it was legally declared in bankruptcy under Arnoldo Alemán's government.

Channel 6 continued operations until 2002 and resumed its formal operations in 2011, this time under a private company run by members of the Ortega family, NEPISA.
