= XHCDM-TDT =

Television station in Mexico City

- Mexico City; Mexico
- Channels: Digital: 21 (UHF); Virtual: 21
- Branding: Capital 21

Programming
- Subchannels: 21.1: Capital 21; 21.2: Congreso TV
- Affiliations: Public government broadcaster

Ownership
- Owner: Government of Mexico City; (Gobierno de la Ciudad de México)

History
- First air date: June 24, 2010
- Call sign meaning: "Ciudad de México"

Technical information
- Licensing authority: CRT
- ERP: 133.57 kW
- HAAT: 248.40 m (815.0 ft)
- Transmitter coordinates: 19°31′47″N 99°07′48″W

Links
- Website: www.capital21.cdmx.gob.mx

XHCDM-TDT (channel 21) is a digital-only television station licensed to Mexico City, Mexico, transmitting from Cerro del Chiquihuite. Branded as Capital 21, it is owned by the Government of Mexico City.

It is one of the newest stations in Mexico City; while the government had worked for years to build a station (which, had it signed on in analog, might have been channel 36, 38 or 42), it received its permit on February 22, 2010, and it signed on in 2012.

== Programming ==
Programming on XHCDM includes cultural and entertainment programming aimed at the general Mexico City area. XHCDM also has several local newscasts that air on weekdays: a 7am newscast entitled Metrópoli 21 and two newscasts titled A Tiempo 21, one at 2:30pm and the other at 9pm. It also carries news programs from Deutsche Welle, typical of other state networks.

=== Subchannels ===
In 2015, XHCDM's digital signal was multiplexed for the first time. A subchannel 21.2 was added, with coverage of the Legislative Assembly of the Federal District. It was retitled "Ciudad TV, Canal de la Asamblea" after a 2016 name change. The name has since been updated to "Ciudad TV, Canal del Congreso de la Ciudad de México" after the 2018 Mexico City Constitution was adopted.

Channel	Video	Short name	Network	Programming
21.1	1080i	XHCDM	Capital 21	Capital 21
21.2	480i	CCDMX	Congreso TV	Mexico City Congress
