= ESTESA =

Nicaraguan cable television company (1989–2009)

ESTESA, abbreviated from Estaciones Terrenas de Satélite, was a Nicaraguan cable television company established in the early 1990s and was acquired by Claro in 2008 (ESTESA's services continue under Claro's brand name).

== History ==
The Pellas family founded ESTESA in 1989. Its initial offer consisted of just 12 channels.

In 2003, ESTESA acquired all of its competitors in Managua and expanded its fiber network. The company set up a new communication center in March 2007, with the aim of starting digital telephony and digital cable. By 2008, ESTESA had 90 channels available in 11 departments.

In August 2008, Claro, owned by telecom magnate Carlos Slim, acquired the entirety of ESTESA. Its subscriber base moved to that of Claro, which was formerly ENITEL. The new brand name was adopted in 2009.
