= Televicentro (Nicaraguan TV channel) =

Nicaraguan TV network

Canal 2
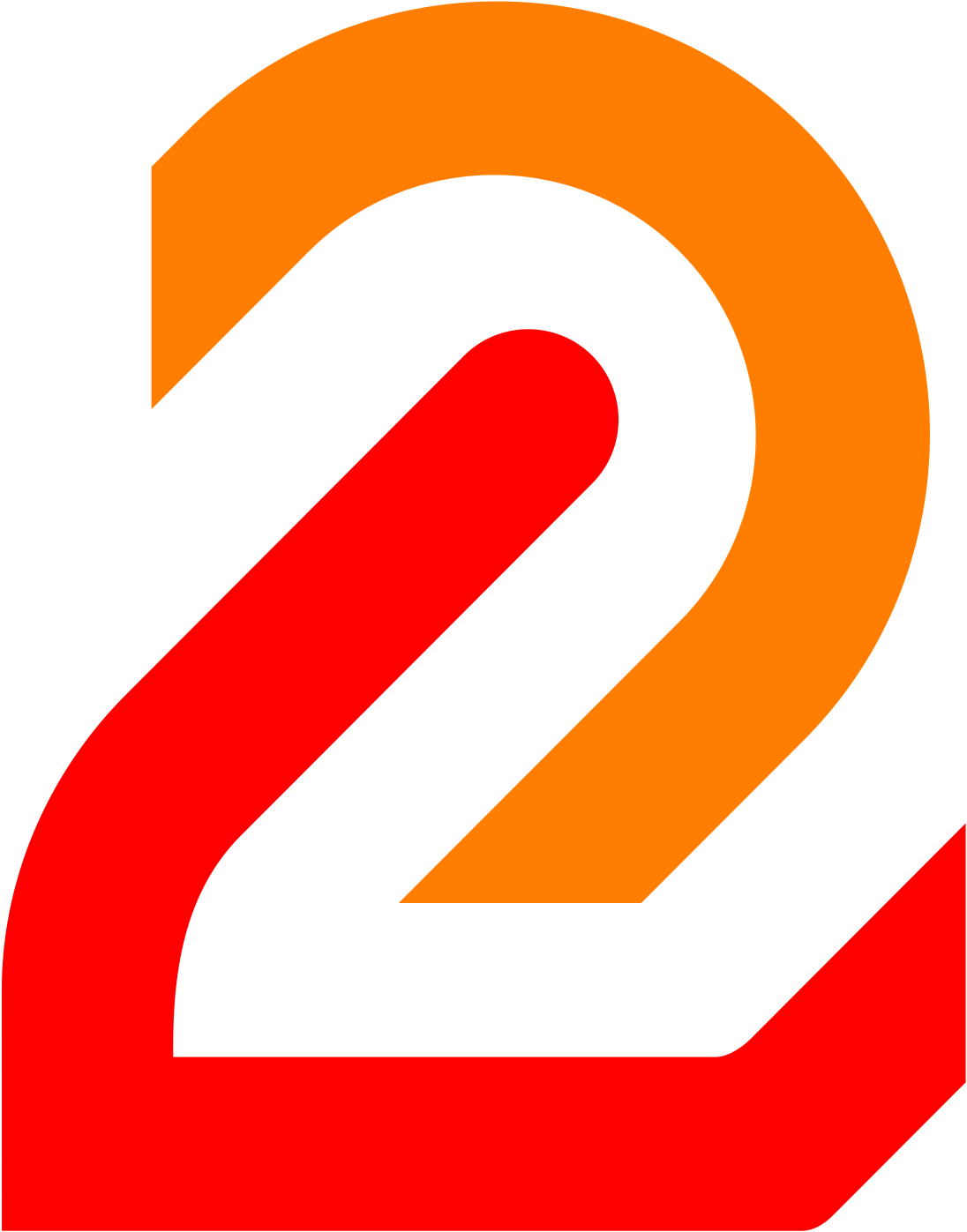
- Type: Free-to-air television network
- Country: Nicaragua
- Broadcast area: Nicaragua

Programming
- Language: Spanish
- Picture format: 480i SDTV

Ownership
- Owner: Televicentro de Nicaragua (Albavisión)

History
- Launched: 1966

Links
- Website: canal2tv.com

Availability

Terrestrial
- Analog VHF: Channel 2 (Managua); Channel 7 (some parts of the country)

Canal 2 is a Nicaraguan free-to-air television network owned by Televicentro de Nicaragua, S.A., owned by the Mexican media mogul Remigio Ángel González. In theory, the channel's sister channels are those of Grupo Ratensa, but in practice, the channel is an independent operation with support from the Nicaraguan government.

== History ==
Televicentro de Nicaragua, S.A. was founded in December 1965 by Octavio Sacasa Sarria and started broadcasting in March 1966. It was the third television channel in Nicaragua after Channel 6, owned by the Somoza family. Televicentro started broadcasting in colour in 1973.

With the triumph of the Sandinista revolution in July 1979, Channel 2 together with Channel 6 were expropriated by the Sandinista government and turned into the Sistema Sandinista de Televisión (SSTV), the Sandinista Television System. Channel 2 returned to its original owners at the end of 1989.

In 1996, Channel 2 became the first Central American TV channel to have an official web site. Canal 2 also broadcasts from relay-transmitter channel 7 in some parts of the country.

In 2005, Televicentro signed an agreement with Channel 33 from Costa Rica to broadcast the evening transmissions of Noticiero 22-22 in that country.

In 2006, the channel started streaming broadcasts.

Between 2007 and 2012, the channel started losing ratings and credibility. TELCOR granted new licenses to both Grupo RATENSA, owner of Canal 10 and the Ortega-Murillo family, whose sons had interests on Canal 4, Viva Nicaragua and acquired TN8. Televicentro distanced itself from its historic critical stance when Daniel Ortega returned to power in 2007.

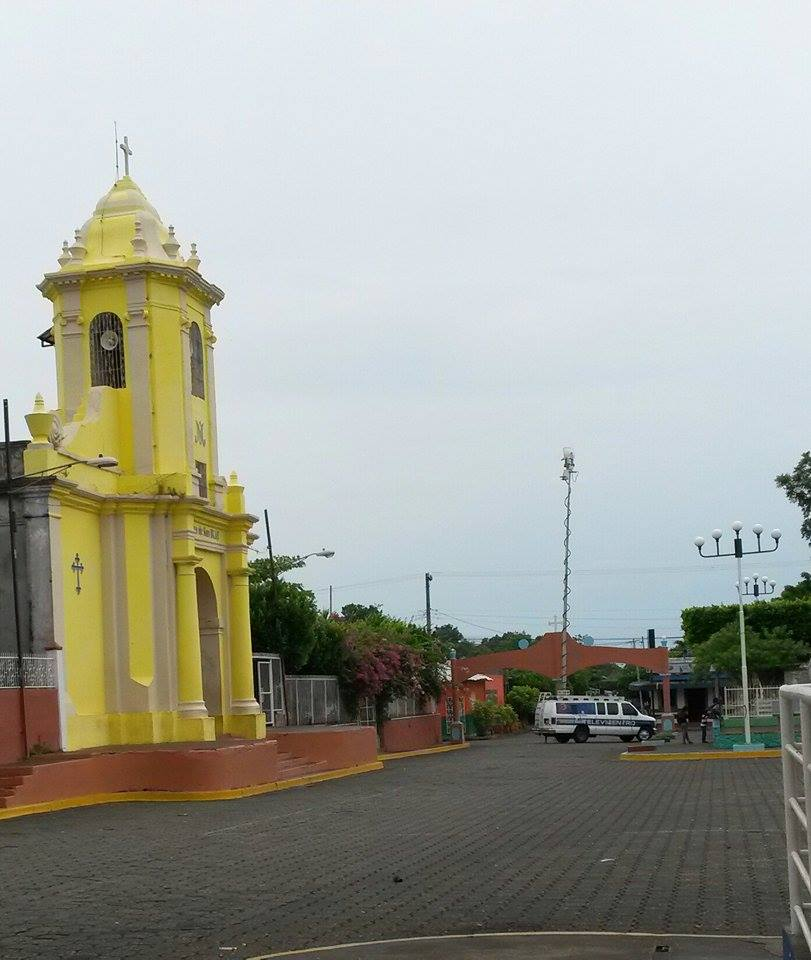
Televicentro outside van at the Saint Blas Church at Chichigalpa, 2015

In late 2011, Octavio Sacasa said that "the channel is not for sale", amid rising concerns that Televicentro's sale to Albavisión was finalized, as other versions of the same story have been circulating in business circles, about alleged advanced negotiations between Sacasa and Ángel González. González and Sacasa were business partners in the USA in the 80s, until becoming arch-rivals in the early 90s, when Sacasa reassumed control of Televicentro.

In 2014, the channel's news operation (TVNoticias) was taken over by Maurice Ortega, aligning it with the government's viewpoint.

In 2015, the channel was definitely sold to Albavisión, as an independent operation from Grupo Ratensa, even though Carlos Pastora from Canal 10 was still managing the channel. González owned the channel by means of one of his figurehead subsidiaries, TV Móvil, in what was considered to be another "blow" to democracy in Nicaragua, and was even condemned by the Nicaraguan Catholic Church. This maneuver allowed the Ortega-Murillo family to have absolute control of the television station and expand the number of media outlets, in exchange for a repeater television frequency for González (channel 7).
