= Canal 6 (Honduran TV channel) =

Television station in San Pedro Sula, Honduras

Canal 6 Honduras
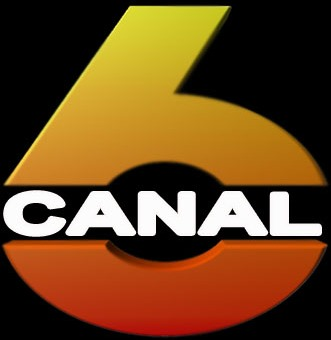
- Type: Spanish-language broadcast television network
- Country: Honduras
- Headquarters: San Pedro Sula, Honduras

Programming
- Picture format: 1080i HDTV

Ownership
- Owner: Compañía Broadcasting Centro America, S.A. de C.V.
- Key people: Rafael Nodarse (President)

History
- Launched: 1977 (in Honduras)
- Founder: Rafael Nodarse
- Former names: Noti 6

Links
- Website: http://www.canal6.com.hn

Canal 6 (Honduras) is a television station in San Pedro Sula, Honduras, that has been broadcasting since June 27, 1977.
