= Viva Nicaragua =

- Country: Nicaragua
- Headquarters: Managua

Programming
- Language: Spanish

Ownership
- Owner: Celeste, S.A. (Maurice, Camila and Luciana Ortega Murillo)

History
- Launched: June 13, 2011; 15 years ago

Links
- Website: www.vivanicaragua.com.ni

Availability

Terrestrial
- Analog VHF: Channel 13

Viva Nicaragua is a television station on channel 13 in Nicaragua. The channel also airs a mix of domestic and international programs, mainly consisting of news, lifestyle and sports programming, along with imported programming consisting of films, children's programs and drama series. It is one of the several outlets which is owned by the Ortega-Murillo family, with Camila Ortega Murillo as its director.

== History ==
The television station was awarded in 2011 in a contested battle over the closeness of the winners, Celeste, S.A., to the family of President Daniel Ortega Celeste was used as a figurehead by the government in order to achieve the license. The frequency was formerly used by a relayer of TN8, however a spokesman of the government said that the channel was owned by Venezuelan funds. Despite the mix of programming, Viva Nicaragua's profile was intended to be a news channel.

Viva Nicaragua also supports the annual Nicaragua Diseña fashion program, which is also led by Camila Ortega. Camila was sanctioned in June 2021.Bayardo Gutiérrez worked as an animator and designer for the channel from launch until his death in 2024; his series Flash Metal also aired on the channel.

In May 2025, the channel announced that it got the rights for the 2025 FIFA Club World Cup.
