= Canal 10 (Nicaraguan TV channel) =

Nicaraguan television channel

- Country: Nicaragua

Programming
- Language: Spanish
- Picture format: 480i SDTV; 1080i HDTV

Ownership
- Owner: Radio y Televisión de Nicaragua, S.A. (Grupo RATENSA/Albavisión)
- Sister channels: Canal 9 Canal 11

History
- Launched: 23 June 1997

Links
- Website: http://www.canal10.com.ni/

Availability

Terrestrial
- Analog VHF: Channel 10

Canal 10 (Canal Diez), is a nationwide terrestrial television channel from Nicaragua owned by Radio y Televisión de Nicaragua, S.A. (RATENSA), a company founded by Mexican investors.

RATENSA formerly owned Canal 4 and also owns a local network of four affiliated radio stations – Tropicálida, Alfa, Radio Galaxia La Picosa and Radio Joya.

Strictly speaking, the channel only has two sister channels (Canal 9 and Canal 11). Albavisión also operates Canal 2 as an independent operation in a condominium with Maurice Ortega, who owns its news operation. Since 2018, however, the channel has been embroiled in a management crisis and fears that the network will eventually fall under the Ortega-Murillo family's sphere of influence.

== History ==
The frequency was given to Carlos Reynaldo and César Augusto Lacayo, but was quickly bought by Ángel González. The channel's frequency was assigned in 1990, and upon Ángel González's control, he assigned Chicho Silva for the post. Broadcasts started on 23 June 1997, under the slogans ¡Sobresaliente! (Outstanding!) and El canal de nuestra gente (our peoples' channel).

The station initially carried exclusively foreign programming; a local newscast was added on 13 August 2001.

On 7 January 2005, the channel fired its existing news team as its newscast (Telediario 10) was replaced by Acción 10, and its presenters didn't match the new newscast's profile.

On 6 October 2005, subscribers of the Estesa cable system (now Claro) got access to a 24/7 feed of the channel, with better image quality and 24/7 programming, after an agreement was signed between Estesa and Ratensa. A new agreement was signed in December with local cable operators, aiming to extend the signal to the entire country, including areas with no signal of the national channel of border areas where Costa Rican channels were dominant.

=== Crisis ===
In August 2018, the channel's manager Carlos Pastora said that a boss from TN8 had forced him to regulate its newscasts and editorial decisions.

On 4 May 2022, the Nicaraguan government cancelled the license of its NGO, Fundación 10, which specialized in help for families and individuals with limited financial resources.

In September 2026, it was reported that ten staff left the channel due to supposed cuts. Among those who left are sports editor Kevin Cruz, journalist Carlos Larios, editor Magaly Rojas and presenter Gulnares Obando - this last one underthe pretext that he was sick, and that although he was known for his efforts working at the channel and that complaints emerged, the company took him away. The ultimate reason for these cuts was the fall in advertising revenue, which also affects Grupo RATENSA as a whole. Miguel Mendoza, an anti-Sandinist journalist, also described that there is a suspicion emerging that Canal 10 will be the next in line to fall under the regime's sphere of influence.
