= Enlace Nicaragua =

Canal 21 Nicaragua
- Broadcast area: Nicaragua
- Headquarters: Managua

Programming
- Language(s): Spanish

Ownership
- Owner: Trinity Broadcasting de Nicaragua Enlace Canal 21, S.A.

History
- Launched: 1991; 34 years ago

Links
- Website: www.enlace.org/nicaragua/

Availability

Terrestrial
- Analog UHF: Channel 21

Enlace Nicaragua is a Christian television channel in Nicaragua, part of the international Enlace TBN network (Trinity Broadcasting Network). It broadcasts on UHF channel 21.

== History ==
Enlace Nicaragua began its broadcasts in 1988 with a low-power transmitter providing it a coverage radius of 2 kilometres (1.2 mi). In 1991, the network began transmitting from Las Nubes, a high mountain 27 kilometres (17 mi) south of the capital of Managua. It was Nicaragua's first UHF television station. The new station soon built studios to begin national program production, as well as a series of repeaters to give it national coverage.

In 2001, the network moved to a new studio location, which has since been expanded with a 500-seat auditorium and a new administration building.

A 2010 press release from the opposition Cambio Cristiano Democrático party described the then-director of Enlace Nicaragua, Guillermo Osorno, as having "sold out" to Daniel Ortega's government, calling on the public to stop giving to Enlace's telethons.

On November 9, 2021, Telcor visited the facilities of Enlace Nicaragua (branded at time of closure as TV21) for an act of "routine inspection" and arbitrarily cancelling the channel's terrestrial television license. Reverend Guillermo Osorno said that the shutdown of the channel was unjustified since most of the programs broadcast by the channel were spiritual and not political.
