= Vos TV =

Vos TV, formerly ESTV, is a Nicaraguan terrestrial TV channel (cable until 2010) broadcasting from the city of Managua. Before it was assigned a terrestrial frequency, it was known as ESTV and ran exclusively on ESTESA's cable network.

== History ==
ESTV (Canal 11)began broadcasting in 2005. Despite being a newcomer in the Nicaraguan TV market, it quickly gained has a broad audience thanks to its nationalistic approach and mass production of local TV shows. The channel's motto is El canal del orgullo nicaragüense (The channel of the Nicaraguan pride).

The most popular local TV shows were: De sol a sol (morning show), La revista del mediodia (variety show), Dónde y cuándo (investigative journalism), Senderos y destinos (tourism, featuring in every show a tourist spot in the country), ESTV Musical (daily music video show), En concierto (music concerts), Lo Nuestro (show featuring only national artists, interviews and music videos), Éxitos empresariales (success stories of Nicaraguan companies), Deportes 11 (sports), Sexto Sentido (popular youth TV series) and live broadcasts of national cultural events, such as local festivities.

In 2005, ESTV made history as the first channel in Central America to produce and broadcast a reality show; En Otra Onda.

On July 27, the channel was rebranded to Vos TV and moved to channel 14 on the Estesa cable TV system.

Grupo Pellas, owner of the channel, wanted to broadcast on the VHF band, but had to go to UHF channel 14 as the two potential frequencies (channels 11 and 13) were already given to Ángel González and a son of Daniel Ortega, respectively.
