= Canal 11 (Nicaragua) =

Nicaraguan broadcast TV channel

- Type: Free-to-air television network
- Country: Nicaragua

Programming
- Language: Spanish
- Picture format: 480i SDTV

Ownership
- Owner: Albavisión (Grupo Ratensa)

History
- Launched: 2010

Availability

Terrestrial
- Analog VHF: Channel 11

TV Red (Canal 11) is a nationwide terrestrial television channel from Nicaragua owned by Ángel González. TV Red began broadcasting in August 2010; until then, channel 11 on Claro TV (the former ESTESA) was occupied by VosTV.

The frequency was initially supposed to be given to Grupo Pellas, who was the owner of ESTV, but was later given to Ángel González of the Albavisión group, amidst much controversy. It is believed that González bought the frequency following the sale of the Canal 4 assets in 2007 following the re-election of Daniel Ortega.
