= Sistema Sandinista de Televisión =

Defunct Nicaraguan television network

The Sandinist Television System (Sistema Sandinista de Televisión - SSTV) was a television network in Nicaragua, owned and operated by the government from 1979 to 1990.

== History ==
When the Sandinistas overthrew the Somoza regime in Nicaragua in 1979, there were only two private television stations broadcasting in Nicaragua. Televicentro (Canal 2), founded in 1965 and owned by Televicentro de Nicaragua, S.A. of the Sacasa family and Canal 6 owned by the Somoza family and founded in 1959.

The SSTV was officially constituted by law on February 10, 1984 but both TV stations were nationalized from their former owners by the Sandinista government already in July 1979 and the SSTV existed de facto since then.

The network was under the administration of a Board of Directors with the following representatives from these institutions:.

- the Council of National Reconstruction
- the president of National Council for Higher Education
- the Ministry of Education
- the Ministry of Culture
- the Ministry of Telecommunications
- the National Teacher's Association
- the Nicaraguan Journalists Union
- as well as representatives of the two channels of SSTV and their station managers

In 1989 the Sandinista government decided to return Televicentro (Canal 2) to the Sacasa family. That was interpreted as an evidence of the political circumstances in the last years of Sandinistas rule with a more open and tolerant policy towards the opposition.

With Violeta Chamorro's triumph in the 1990 elections, the network was dismantled and Canal 6 became part of The National Television System (Sistema Nacional de Televisión - SNTV) until 1997 when it was legally declared in bankruptcy under Arnoldo Alemán's government. After 16 years of abandonment, on September 14, 2011, Channel 6 was again on the air, due to the investments made by the Nicaraguan government in the restoration of the channel.

== Programming ==
In the beginning, because of the economic blockade imposed by the United States, the SSTV programming was composed of US series and Cuban productions used to educate according to the new government's ideology.

However, with the help of European professionals (especially from Soviet bloc countries) and Cubans, the network created programs of ample remembrance among the Nicaraguan population while at the same time forming talents that would influence the Nicaraguan television scene. Among the programs produced by SSTV are La Liga del Saber, El Chocoyito Chimbarón, Domingos Espectaculares (Spectacular Sundays) and several documentaries about the Sandinista Revolution.

Channel 6 offered a generalist programming while Channel 2 specialized in educational and cultural programming.
