= Canal 4 (Nicaraguan TV channel) =

National TV channel in Nicaragua

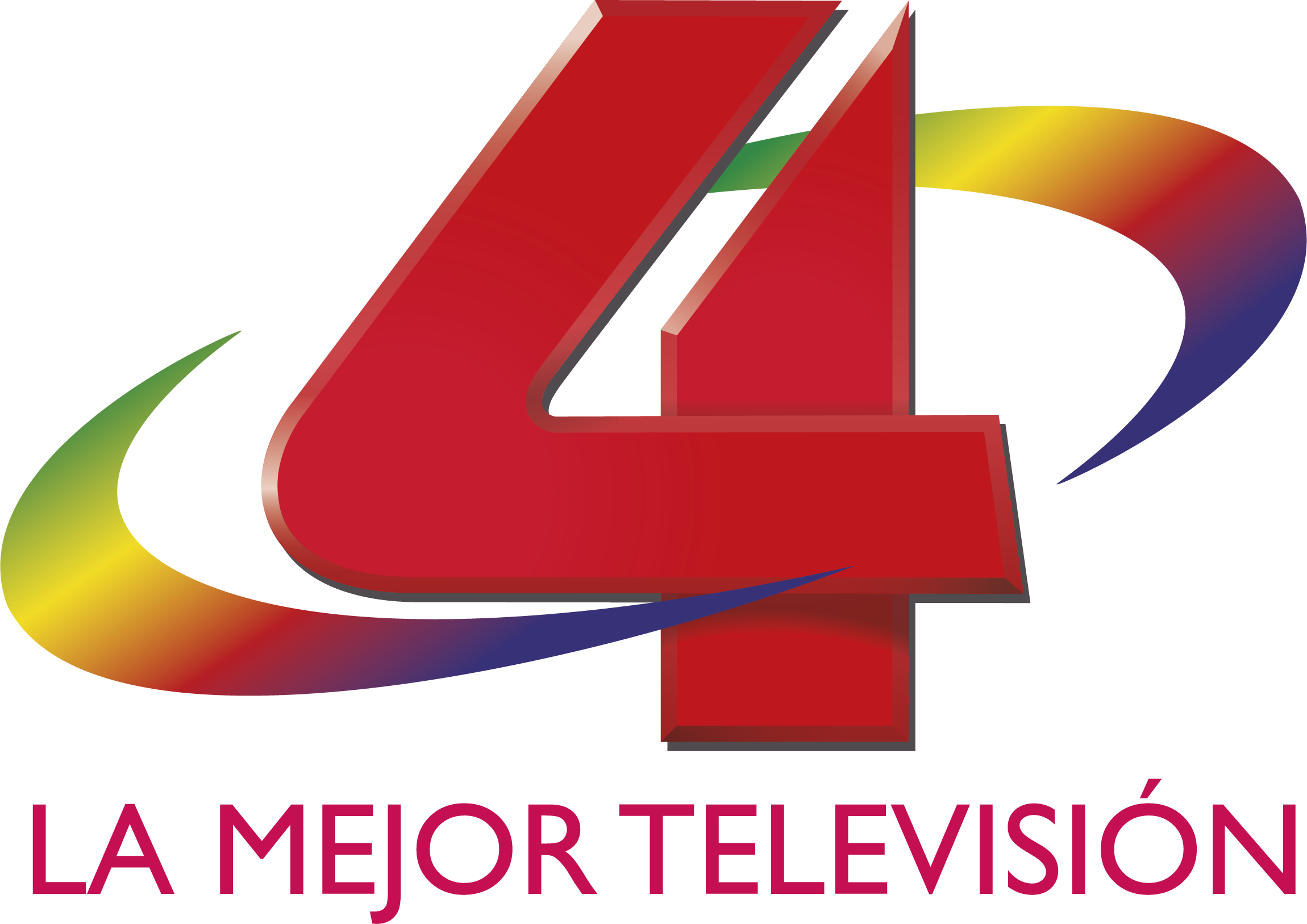
- Country: Nicaragua
- Affiliates: teleSUR

Programming
- Language: Spanish
- Picture format: 1080i HDTV (downscaled to 480i for the SD feed)

Ownership
- Owner: Intrasa: Informativos de Televisión y Radio S.A. (Carlos Enrique and Daniel Edmundo Ortega)

History
- Launched: 1990 (experimental); 1992 (regular)

Links
- Website: http://www.canal4.com.ni/

Availability

Terrestrial
- Analog VHF: Channel 4

Canal 4 (Nueva Imagen, S.A.) is a state-run nationwide terrestrial television channel in Nicaragua owned by Informativos de Televisión y Radio S.A. (Intrasa), a company owned by two sons of Nicaraguan President Daniel Ortega, Carlos Enrique "Tino" Ortega and his brother Daniel Edmundo. Until 2007, Remigio Ángel González of Albavisión owned 94% of the channel's assets, after that, the Ortega-Murillo family regained control.

== History ==
Before the formation of the Sandinist government, the frequency was first used by Telecadena Nicaraguense, assigned to Oleoductos de Nicaragua S.A., from Anastasio Somoza Debayle, and granted to journalist Luis Felipe Hidalgo. The station signed on on August 12, 1970, but shut down in 1972 for two factors: the lack of a wide television market to cover all of the existing channels, and the high cost of television production.

In 1990, with the defeat of the Sandinist regime, the channel was reactivated and in the early 1990s, Remigio Ángel González helped the FSLN in the creation of Canal 4, initially led by Dionisio Marenco. Marenco recalls travelling to Miami, where González had an office, and González supported the creation of the channel from scratch, in a very hostile environment, providing mainly with equipment. During this period, the channel aired cartoons and music videos aimed at younger audiences until 8pm, and from then until sign-off, feature films and telenovelas. The station began building a studio in December 1992 and started producing its own programs in early 1993. This in 1993 alone only contributed to 2% of the weekly total, the rest being entirely foreign. In April 1993, the offer consisted of around 59% feature films, 24% children's programs, 4% news; the remaining 13% from series and short programs with a focus on sports and music.

The channel broadcast 63 hours a week in 1994.

The channel experienced a crisis in the 1990s. This was seen as an opportunity for Ángel Gonzáles to set up Nueva Imagen, kicking off a productive relation with Canal 10.

A new policy affected the channel in 1998. Many Nicaraguan productions (Generación 2000, Tú Música, Tita; Ternura, Puerta Diez) were cancelled as part of a new policy to clean local productions from the channel, the only ones that survived were the newscast (Multinoticias) and La cámara matizona, due to a transfer of ownership.

Under the commercial control of RATENSA, the channel was also subject to some technological advancements that its then-sister channel Canal 10 was subjected to, including a 24/7 cable feed on ESTESA and wider carriage on cable operators in areas with weak terrestrial reception.

Over time, the RATENSA administration caused a debt for the channel, as the Sandinists were unable to pay the programs they bought from González. When Daniel Ortega became president of Nicaragua again in January 2007, he recovered Canal 4's assets, but González later was benefitted from other frequencies (11 and later 9)
