= Canal 6 (Nicaraguan TV channel) =

- Country: Nicaragua

Programming
- Language: Spanish
- Picture format: 480i SDTV

Ownership
- Owner: NEPISA (Negocios Publicitarios Internacionales, S.A.)

History
- Launched: January 17, 1957

Links
- Website: http://www.canal6.com.ni/

Availability

Terrestrial
- Analog VHF: Channel 6
- Digital UHF: Channel 20.1

Canal 6 is a Nicaraguan terrestrial television channel broadcasting from the city of Managua. The station claims to be owned by the Government of Nicaragua, but is actually owned by a joint stock company called NEPISA (Negocios Publicitarios Internacionales).

The channel's current director is Aarón Josué Peralta Obregón, former director of the Sandinist Youth.

== History ==
Canal 6 started broadcasting on January 17, 1957, as Nicaragua's second television channel, after Channel 8 that was established the year before. It was owned by Salvadora Debayle de Somoza and Lilliam Somoza de Sevilla, daughter of the then president Anastasio Somoza Garcia. In 1962, its programming was seen on channel 8 after a decision to merge the two extant channels.

When the Sandinistas overthrew the Somoza regime in Nicaragua in 1979, Canal 6 was nationalized and became part of the state owned Sistema Sandinista de Televisión. The station had a relay in Bluefields (established in January 1980 thanks to the installation of a national microwave network) which, in the 1980s, was autonomous. In August 1989, the station was restored with help from Cuban technicians after its transmitter was damaged by a hurricane. The station relayed Canal 6's output and aired a local news service two to three times a week; its news team consisted exclusively of a reporter and an editor.

With Violeta Chamorro's triumph in the 1990 elections, Canal 6 became part of the rebranded state television network SNTV until 1997, when it was legally declared bankrupt under Arnoldo Alemán's government.

A fraud scandal involving the redirection of money erupted in March 2002, before the channel shut down. An audit followed in April.

A new project was announced for the frequency in September 2006. This time the aim was to be an educational channel.

Canal 6 was restored by the Government. Weeks before its resumption, the building was cleaned, as it had outdated equipment and was set to be among the official television channels. Orlando Castillo, executive president of Telcor, confirmed the comeback on September 6, although the programming was still yet to be defined by the government. It then resumed operations on September 14, 2011, after investing in its redevelopment since 2008.

Upon its resumption, Canal 6 broadcast a varied schedule, including cartoons from the 80s (when it was part of the SSTV network), musical programming and news flashes about the presidential campaign of Daniel Ortega throughout the day, as well as relays from Telesur and RT's Spanish service.

In November 2019, Canal 6 started managing a second channel, occupying the terrestrial signal of the former 100% Noticias with a secondary channel, Canal 15, carrying educational and cultural programming.

On April 9, 2024, it received a set of 4×4 trucks (three Toyota Hilux trucks and a Toyota Hiace minibus) from Casa Pellas to improve its mobile fleet, costing C$5,347,147.87.

== Criticism ==
Since Daniel Ortega took over control of Canal 6 in 2007, the channel has been criticized by media outlets for the lack of transparency in certain transactions, as well as the state of its equipment. The channel is believed not to be self-sustaining and instead be reliant on the budget of the Nicaraguan presidency.

As of March 2023, the station had a monthly operating revenue of C$428,593.64, or C$5,571,717.32 (US$ 152,577.30) annually. According to Nicaragua Investiga, the channel is used to broadcast manipulated information, which is heavily condemned by locals.
