= LGBTQ representation in Ecuadorian television =

The representation of sexual diversity on Ecuadorian television began in the late 1990s, with the appearance of the first homosexual character on local television, featured in the show Mis adorables entenados con billete (1998). However, both this character and others identifying as LGBT who appeared on television during those years tended to reproduce negative stereotypes, often intended to generate humor through mockery of people belonging to sexual minorities. This trend continued well into the 2010s.

With the turn of the 20th to the 21st century, the first openly LGBT individuals began appearing on Ecuadorian television. Óscar Ugarte, a journalist who worked as a presenter in the 1990s, was one of the first public figures to come out, while transgender actress Rudy Arana began her television career in the drama series Archivos del destino. Widely covered by the media was the 2005 participation of model Juan Sebastián López in the reality show Gran Hermano del Pacífico, where he came out publicly and shared the first same-sex kiss in the history of Ecuadorian television. Aside from those already mentioned, other people belonging to the LGBTQ+ community also entered local television during the 2000s, although most were featured in entertainment or beauty-related shows.

In 2013, the National Assembly of Ecuador passed the Organic Law of Communication, which included a clause prohibiting discriminatory content and the promotion of discrimination or violent acts against vulnerable groups. This enabled civil organizations to successfully report television programs that featured characters reinforcing harmful stereotypes. The 2010s also saw the appearance of openly LGBT figures on local television, including non-binary actor Adrián Avilés and transgender actress Doménica Menessini.

Although in recent years some portrayals of LGBT characters have become more nuanced, stereotypes or storylines ending in violence are still common. Additionally, the presence of LGBT characters or actors remains minimal. By 2020, it was estimated that only around 1% of television characters in Ecuador were LGBT.

== Background (until 1997) ==
Until the decriminalization of homosexuality in Ecuador, which took place in 1997, there were no fictional characters from the LGBT community portrayed in local television programs, although the topic occasionally appeared in television advertisements or interviews. In 1984, after the first cases of HIV and AIDS were reported in the country, the government's response—at a time when the disease was still popularly associated with homosexuality—included a stigmatizing television commercial. In the ad, a young man arrives at the wake of another, only for the deceased’s mother to drive him away, saying, “Don’t come near. It’s your fault, because he was homosexual, that my son has died.” The government's campaign also falsely suggested that all homosexual people were infected with the virus.

In 1986, LGBT activist Orlando Montoya made history in Ecuadorian LGBT activism by participating in an interview on Teleamazonas to denounce hate crimes against the LGBT community and the impunity surrounding them. At the time, the National Police regularly raided venues frequented by LGBT individuals. This appearance made Montoya the first openly gay person on Ecuadorian television to publicly denounce homophobia.

== Early Representations (1998–2009) ==
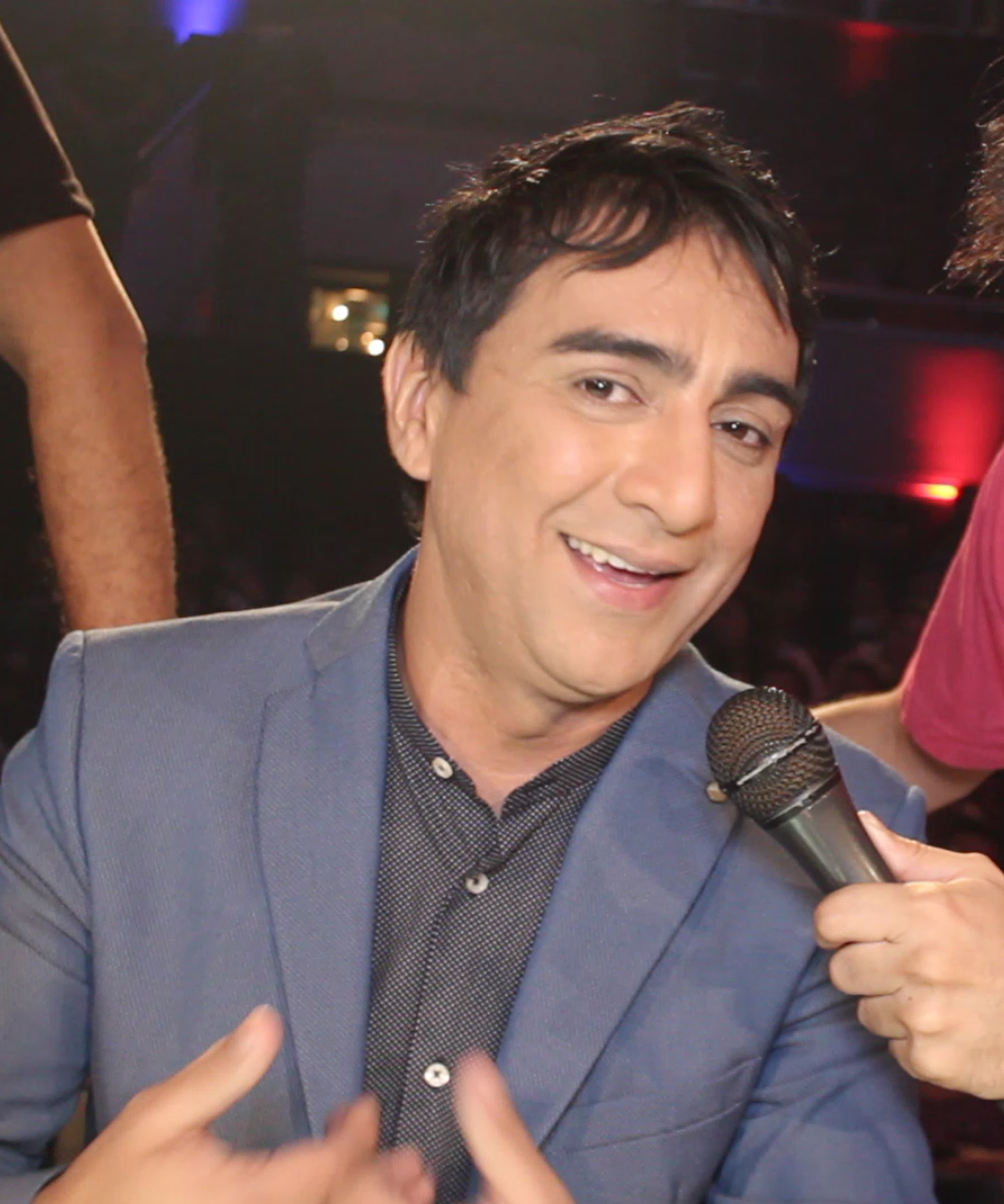
Fernando Villarroel, the actor who portrayed the first LGBT character on Ecuadorian television.

The first LGBT character on Ecuadorian television was Fermín, a flamboyant gay butler who appeared in 1998 on the show Mis adorables entenados con billete, portrayed by actor Fernando Villarroel. Characters with similar stereotypes appeared in the following years in comedy shows such as Ni En Vivo Ni En Directo, which introduced the character La Melo, and Solteros sin compromiso (2001), which exaggerated the perceived femininity of an LGBT character played by actor Alberto Cajamarca when interacting with other male characters. La Melo, in particular, became a controversial character due to the way it portrayed gay men as effeminate and sexually uninhibited. The character remained on television until 2014 and was even publicly criticized by LGBT activists in the National Assembly of Ecuador.

The turn of the century brought the first openly LGBT figures to Ecuadorian television. One of them was journalist Óscar Ugarte, who began publicly advocating for LGBT rights in 2001. Also notable is transgender actress Rudy Arana, who began her acting career on the TV drama Archivos del destino, broadcast by TC Televisión. She later appeared in De la vida real and Mostro de Amor (2010), in which she played the role of a transgender woman who helped the residents of her neighborhood.

The first same-sex kiss on Ecuadorian television occurred in 2005 during the reality show Gran Hermano del Pacífico, in which Ecuadorian model Juan Sebastián López came out as gay during the program and went on to win the competition. He kissed another contestant on-air. The media exposure of the kiss led López to go on a press tour after the show ended, during which he spoke about his experiences as a gay man. He went on to participate in other local reality shows and was named master of ceremonies for the Quito LGBT Pride festival.

In 2005, the morning show Cosas de casa invited a young gay man on one of its broadcasts to talk about his experiences and his rights. The invitation came after the show made a public call for a young person willing to come out of the closet.

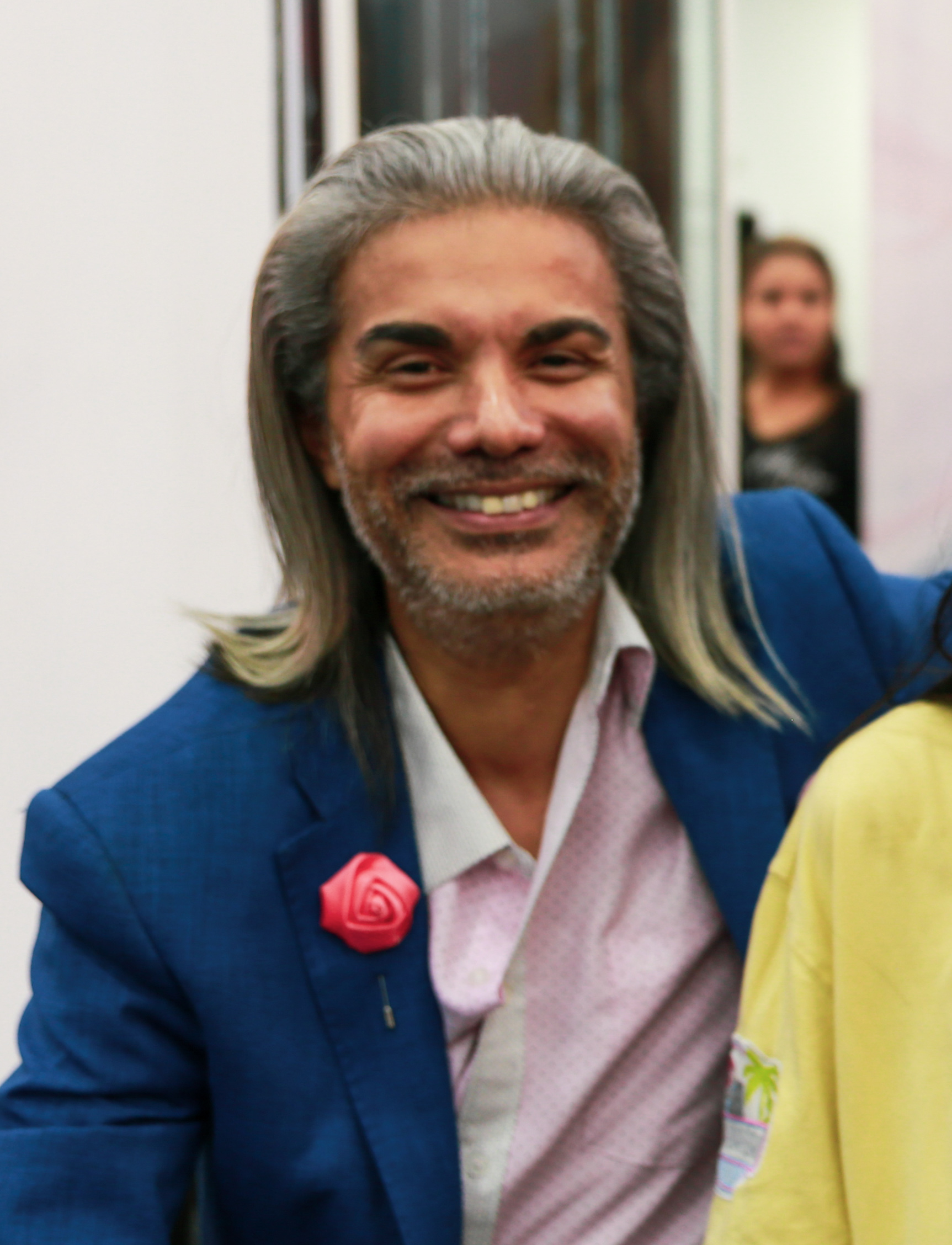
Giovanni Dupleint, Ecuadorian activist and television host.

During these years, openly LGBT individuals began to appear in various television programs. However, with the exception of Óscar Ugarte, their presence was largely limited to entertainment, cooking, or beauty shows rather than opinion or news programs. Among the local personalities who gained visibility in such formats was Giovanni Dupleint, a bisexual presenter who appeared in entertainment and celebrity shows such as Buenos muchachos and Vamos con todo.

Led by actor Martín Calle, two television series featuring LGBT characters premiered in 2008 and 2009: El secreto de Toño Palomino (2008) and El exitoso Lcdo. Cardoso (2009). However, Calle’s portrayal also relied heavily on exaggerated stereotypes, including effeminate behavior and sexually suggestive double entendres, which were used to mock the character.

== 2010s ==
The early 2010s saw the emergence of several LGBT figures on Ecuadorian television. In 2012, actor Adrián Avilés joined the cast of the Ecuadorian adaptation of the series Aída, while artist Angela Peñaherrera worked on the educational program Aprendamos. The following year, transgender actress Doménica Menessini appeared on the reality show Baila la noche, broadcast by Canal Uno.

In 2013, the National Assembly of Ecuador passed the Organic Law of Communication, aiming to regulate media content and broadcasting frequencies. Journalists and international organizations argued that the law violated press freedom, although they acknowledged that certain sections were positive. Among the positive measures, the law included a clause against discriminatory content, which stated:

The dissemination through any form of social media of discriminatory content aimed at undermining or nullifying the recognition, enjoyment, or exercise of human rights as recognized in the Constitution and international instruments is prohibited. The dissemination of messages through the media that constitute advocacy of discrimination or incitement to engage in discriminatory or violent acts is also prohibited.

In 2014, another character came under fire for perpetuating homophobic stereotypes: La Michy, portrayed by Víctor Aráuz and popularized on the program Vivos. Among the critics was actor Diego Ulloa, who described the character as "offensive".

Based on the anti-discrimination clause of the Organic Law of Communication, in 2014, thirty-three citizen collectives and LGBT rights groups filed a complaint against the television programs Vivos and La pareja feliz with the Superintendence of Communication and the Ombudsman’s Office of Ecuador, alleging that the shows promoted racist, sexist, and homophobic discrimination in their content. One of the discriminatory storylines in La pareja feliz involved a scene where the coworkers of Valentín, a gay character in the series, tried to convince him to attend a "conversion therapy clinic" to "make him a man". The case was ruled in favor of the plaintiffs, and the television network Teleamazonas was ordered to pay a fine, as well as to issue a public apology for the discriminatory content.

The series 3 familias, which premiered on the Ecuavisa network in 2014, featured a gay character named Kiki Kilovatio, played by Efraín Ruales. Initially depicted as a stereotypical hairdresser, the character later transitions into a more complex role when he successfully pursues a university degree and becomes an accountant. According to screenwriter Eddie González, portrayals like these were used because audiences were accustomed to stereotypical depictions of homosexuality, and the best way to introduce a more diverse character was through a narrative of professional transition. A similar example occurred in the series Cuatro Cuartos (2017), where the character Jaquna was initially shown as a flamboyant gay stereotype but was later developed into a more nuanced character. However, the character met a tragic end in 2018 after a viewer vote led to his on-screen murder in a homophobic attack that lasted nearly 10 minutes.

In April 2016, the channel Ecuavisa aired a program that presented various perspectives on discrimination against sexual diversity, voiced by young people. This marked the first time an Ecuadorian television network had produced a show of this nature.

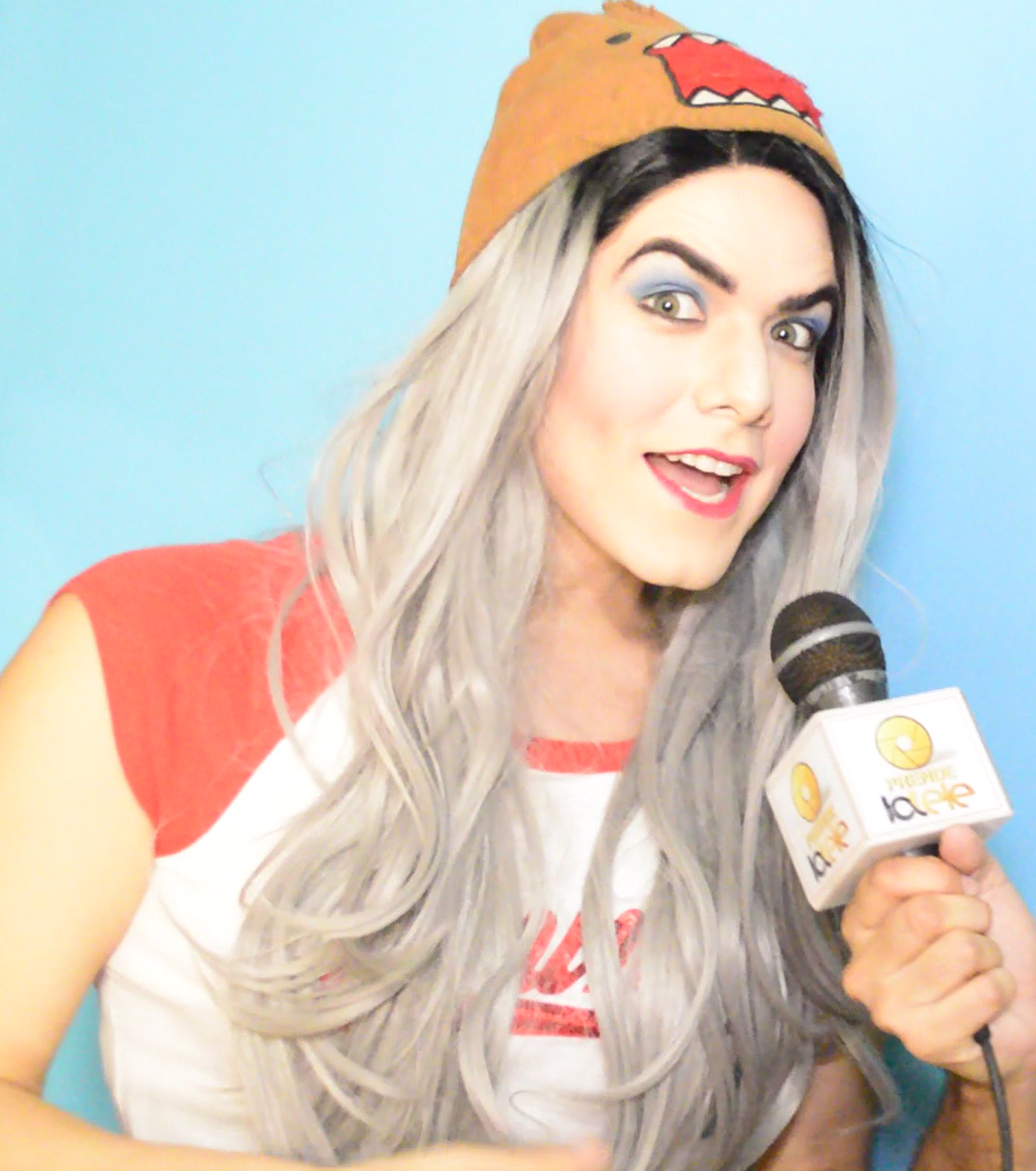
Adrián Avilés portraying the drag queen character Kuki Entrerríos.

LGBT personalities continued to appear in television productions throughout these years. The non-binary actor Adrián Avilés, for instance, acted in the series 3 Familias and Cuatro Cuartos, and their drag queen character, Kuki Entrerríos, served as a judge in reality show competitions and appeared in morning shows such as En Contacto. On the production side, LGBT screenwriter Xavier Hidalgo contributed as a writer for series such as Bienvenidos a la Trinity (2016) and also served as president of the Ecuadorian Association of Screenwriters.

== 2020s ==
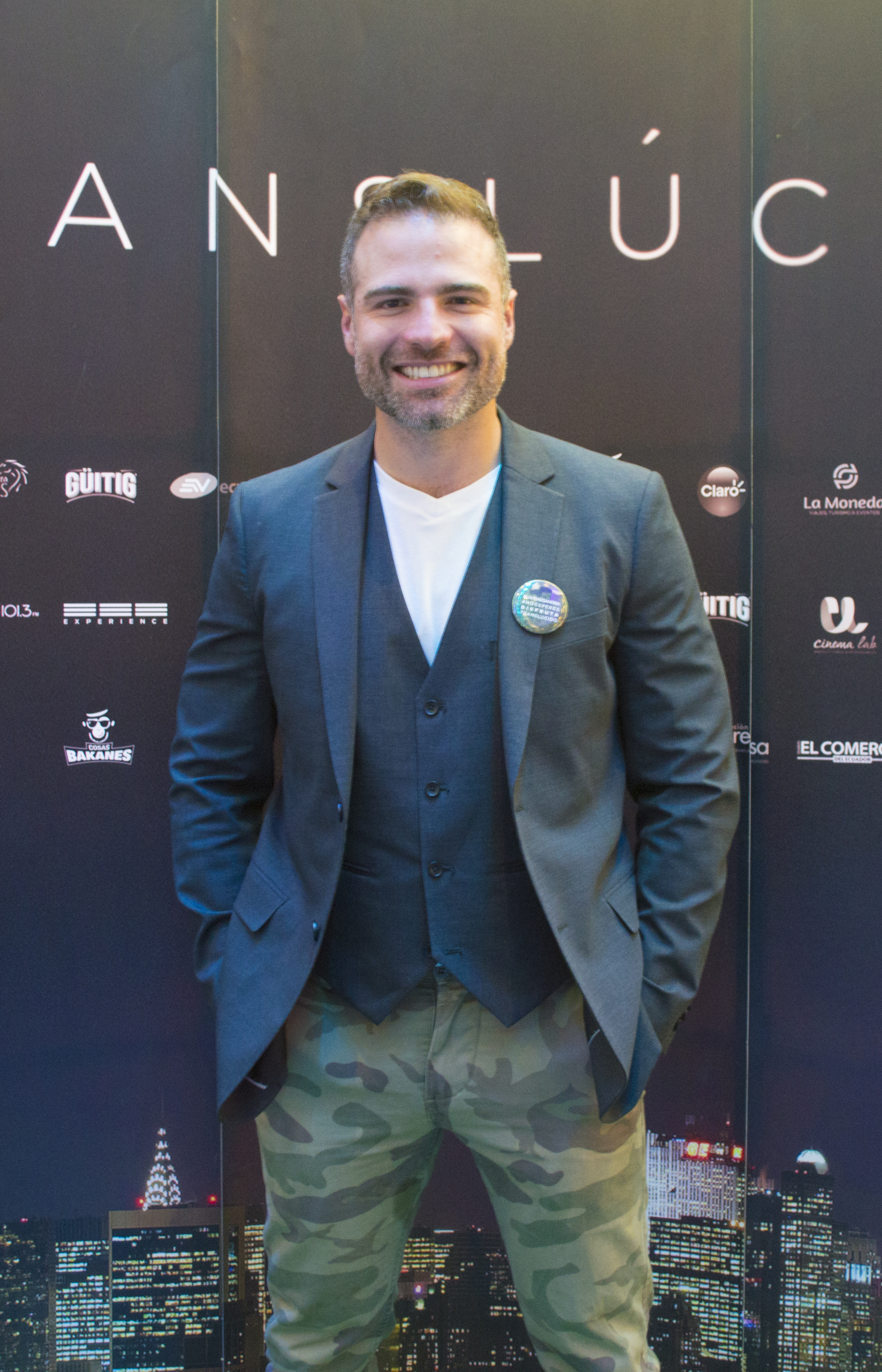
Roberto Manrique in 2017.

In August 2021, Ecuadorian actor Roberto Manrique—whose extensive career in both national and international television began in 2003 with the Ecuadorian production La Hechicera—publicly came out as gay. According to Manrique, he made the announcement to help others in similar situations accept themselves.

A few months earlier, Ecuadorian journalist Galo Arellano—who was based in the United States but began his career on Ecuadorian television—also publicly came out as gay. He made the statement after receiving homophobic messages on social media following the publication of a photo with his husband.

In recent years, LGBT individuals have expanded their presence in reality television programs. In 2023, Doménica Menessini returned to the small screen on the reality show Soy el mejor. Singer Nikki Mackliff, meanwhile, participated in the Ecuadorian edition of MasterChef.

Transgender model Nathalia Espinoza also joined as a contestant on Desafío a la fama.

On the side of scripted television, programs such as the telenovela Casi cuarentonas (2021) included LGBT characters who broke away from stereotypes and focused their humor on the situations portrayed, rather than on exaggerated character traits.

== See also ==
- Television in Ecuador

== Bibliography ==
- Cardona, Luz (2019). Sotavento y Barlovento: The Impact of Societal and State-Society Interactions on Legal Changes Regarding Sexual Diversity in Peru and Ecuador (1980–2018) (PDF). FLACSO México. Archived (PDF) from the original on 2021-08-20.
- Mancero, Cristina (2007). "The Construction of the Gay Movement and Its Social, Cultural, and Political Manifestations in the City of Quito" (PDF). Facultad Latinoamericana de Ciencias Sociales. Archived from the original (PDF) on 2020-07-10.
