= María Fernanda Ríos =

Ecuadorian actor (born 1982)

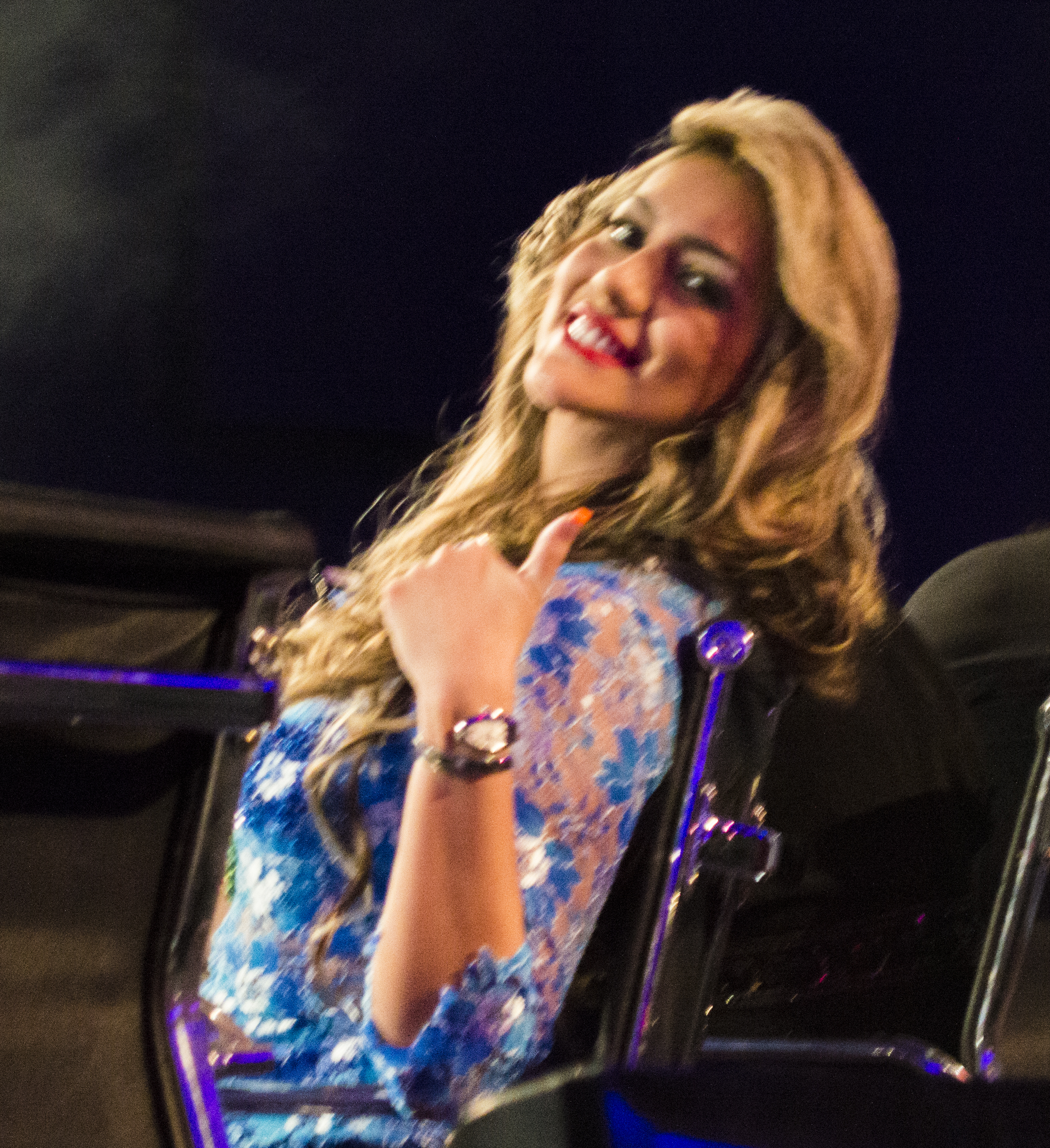
- Born: María Fernanda Ríos Villalta; February 20, 1982 (age 44); Guayaquil, Ecuador
- Occupations: Actress, singer, model, fashion designer
- Spouse: Miguel Ángel Álvarez (m. 2019; div. 2020)

María Fernanda Ríos Villalta (born February 20, 1982), also known as Mafer Ríos, is an Ecuadorian actress, singer, model, and fashion designer. She is known for performing in the tecnocumbia groups Leche y Chocolate and Kandela & Son, for acting in TV series such as El Combo Amarillo and Los Hijos de Don Juan, and for being a juror on Ecuador's Got Talent. In 2018, she played entertainer Sharon la Hechicera in an eponymous telenovela.

== Career ==
=== Beginnings and music ===
María Fernanda Ríos was born in Guayaquil on February 20, 1982. She studied ballet and attended the Danzas Jazz academy.

She studied medicine for three years at the Universidad Católica de Santiago de Guayaquil, after which she left to dedicate herself to the arts.

She began as a singer and dancer in technocumbia groups such as Leche y Chocolate (created by Sharon la Hechicera), Las Musas, and most famously Kandela & Son, which she joined with Jasú Montero, Jordana Doylet, Malena Fernández-Madrid, Carla Ramírez, and Diana Guerrero. She stayed with the group for a year, leaving after appearing on the program A todo dar.

=== Television ===
After retiring from music, Ríos tried her luck on television, on the RTU youth program El Callejón. Shortly afterward, she moved to Gamavisión as presenter of the show business program Rojo Rosa.

She played Mariana on the TC Televisión telenovela Jocelito, starring Fernando Villarroel, along with Roberto Manrique, who played her boyfriend.

Returning to Gamavisión, she appeared in Infiltrados, Buenos Muchachos, and the dancing competition Bailando por un sueño, where she finished second.

She also appeared on Teleamazonas shows such as Historias Personales, Súper Espías, Vivos, and La pareja feliz.

She moved to Ecuavisa in 2010, playing the character Selva Monina in the telenovela La taxista, starring Claudia Camposano. After its success, Ecuavisa created the spin-off comic series El Combo Amarillo, which Ríos remained with until its conclusion in 2016. She was also a juror for the second, third, and fourth seasons of Ecuador's Got Talent.

She was nominated for ITV Awards for Best Comedy Actress in 2013, 2014, and 2015.

She played Juana Francisca Silva on the TC Televisión comedy series Los Hijos de Don Juan.

From 2018 to 2019, she starred in the biographical telenovela Sharon la Hechicera, playing the late singer in her adulthood until her death. In real life, Ríos had been very close to Hechicera since her time in the group Leche y Chocolate, recalling "I worked with Sharon. And then she was my boss and I learned things with her. Then I belonged to another group, then we were friends, and now I am the one who is playing her."

In 2021, she was a juror on the fifth season of Soy el mejor.

=== Fashion designer ===
Ríos made her debut as a fashion designer at Salinas Fashion Week 2014. She has a line of clothing sold under the brand MFR.

== Controversies ==
As a juror on the fourth season of Ecuador's Got Talent in 2015, Ríos rebuked a 16-year-old contestant for being an atheist, advising that she would never be successful if she did not believe in God. The criticisms that emerged from various atheist associations had wide repercussions in the domestic and international press. Following comments made toward her via social networks, she answered her critics directly, which the program's producers considered to be inappropriate. She was dismissed from the jury, leaving her companions Wendy Vera, Paola Farías, and Fernando Villarroel to judge the semifinals.

== Personal life ==
María Fernanda Ríos had a romantic relationship with Jonathan Estrada Becerra, her coworker at El Combo Amarillo, and later with the comic actor David Reinoso.

In July 2019, through her official Instagram account, she announced that she had married Colombian model Miguel Ángel Álvarez. However, approximately four months later she announced their separation. In December 2020, she confirmed on social media that their divorce was final.

== Filmography ==
=== TV series and telenovelas ===
Year	Title	Character
2004	Jocelito	Mariana
2005	Historias personales	Various characters
2006	Super espías	Cast
2009	La pareja feliz	Colorina
2009	Vivos	Various characters
2010–2011	La taxista	Selva Monina
2012–2016	El Combo Amarillo	Selva Monina
2016	Los Hijos de Don Juan	Juana Francisca Silva
2018–2019	Sharon la Hechicera	Sharon la Hechicera

=== TV programs ===
Year	Title	Role
2005	El Callejón	
2005	Infiltrados	Presenter
2005	Rosa Roja	Presenter
2006	Buenos Muchachos	Presenter
2007	Bailando por un sueño	Contestant (semifinalist)
2013-2015	Ecuador's Got Talent	Juror
2020	En contacto	Guest presenter
2021	Soy el mejor	Juror
