= Mariela Viteri =

Ecuadorian television presenter and actress (born 1968)

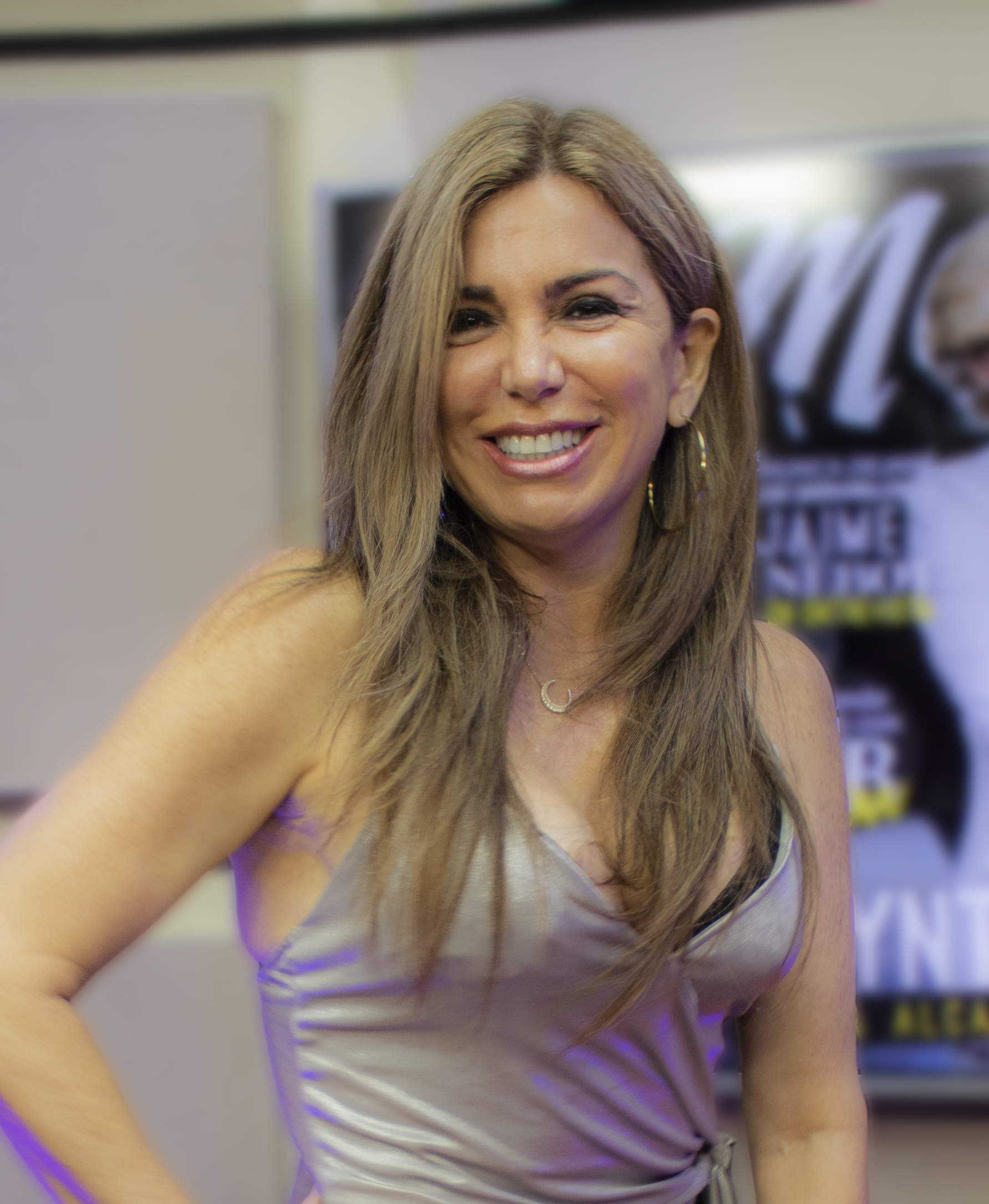
- Viteri in 2019
- Born: Mariela de Jesús Viteri Velasco; December 27, 1968 (age 57); Bahía de Caráquez, Ecuador
- Occupations: TV presenter, actress, businesswoman
- Spouse: Ricardo Mórtola (divorced)

Mariela de Jesús Viteri Velasco (born December 27, 1968) is an Ecuadorian television presenter, radio host, media director, and actress. She has hosted talk shows such as Simplemente Mariela, which ran for 12 seasons on Telecentro (now TC Televisión).

She is also a businesswoman, serving as the media director of Radio Fuego and the magazine Revista Mariela. In 2013, her company Producciones de Fuego launched the website MarielaTV.com and YouTube channel MarielaTV.

== Early life ==
Mariela Viteri was born in Bahía de Caráquez on December 27, 1968, to parents Mariana Velasco and Dr. Leonardo Viteri. She has four siblings.

== Career ==
Viteri began her television career in 1989 on the Telecentro program Aplausos. After this, she co-hosted Música y Deportes with Gerardo España on the channel CableDeportes, following a format of mischievous interviews with national and international personalities. She became the main face of the show after España's departure.

In 1993, Viteri moved to CRE Televisión (now Canal Uno), where she worked as an interviewer for the shows Na 'que ver and Media hora con Mariela.

In early 1994, she created the program Aquí Mariela on Teleamazonas, where she was given the opportunity to interview personalities from both Ecuador and Spain.

Viteri returned to Telecentro in 1997 to host La Hora de Mariela. This had low ratings, as it was a midday program opposite the popular El Show de Bernard. Due to its poor performance, Jorge Kronfle proposed a new weekly interview program, Simplemente Mariela. This was a great success, remaining on the air for 12 seasons, and frequently leading its time slot.

She has been a juror for several competition programs, such as Escuela de famosos in 2011, Soy el mejor VIP in 2014, and Prueba de amor in 2019.

=== Foray into acting ===
In 2018, Viteri acted in the Ecuavisa telenovela Sharon la Hechicera, in which she narrates the life of the titular singer. In the story, Viteri plays the character Luz María, host of the TV show Destellos, based on Luzmila Nicolalde, host of Chispazos. The same year, she made a special appearance on the fourth season of the comedy 3 familias, also on Ecuavisa.

=== Radio Fuego and Revista Mariela ===
Viteri is a businesswoman, serving as the executive president of Radio Fuego: 106.5 FM, created in 1995 together with her then husband Ricardo Mórtola, and of Revista Mariela, launched in 2006 as a guide for women on the topics of nutrition, psychology, interviews, entertainment, and fashion.

=== Digital media ===
In 2013, her company Producciones de Fuego launched the web platform MarielaTV.com, as an outlet for both magazine and radio station. Her YouTube channel features content such as interviews with personalities from the entertainment medium under the title Miércoles de MarielaTV, as well as nutrition, health, beauty, and psychology interviews on Mariela en Cabina.

She has recorded six short Christmas albums for charity: Que canten los niños, Ahora tengo más, Vive, Yo quiero ser como tú, La familia, and Amigos por Ecuador, the latter with Daniel Betancourth, Fausto Miño, David Reinoso, and Francisco Pinoargotti.

== Media roles ==
=== TV programs ===
- Aplausos (1989, Telecentro) - presenter
- Música y Deportes (1990, CableDeportes) - presenter
- Media hora con Mariela (1993, CRE Televisión) - presenter
- Na que ver (1993, CRE Televisión) - presenter
- Aquí Mariela (1994, Teleamazonas) - presenter
- La Hora de Mariela (1997, TC Televisión) - presenter
- Simplemente Mariela (1998–2011, TC Televisión) - presenter
- Escuela de famosos (2011, Ecuavisa) - juror
- MarielaTV (2015, Telerama) - presenter
- Soy el mejor VIP (2015, TC Televisión) - juror
- Prueba de amor (2019, Ecuavisa) - juror
- EnfiesTC (2020, TC Televisión) – guest presenter

=== Digital programs ===
- MarielaTV (2013–present, YouTube) - presenter

=== Radio programs ===
- MarielaTV (2013–present, Radio Fuego) - presenter

=== Telenovelas ===
- 3 familias (2018, Ecuavisa – herself
- Sharon la Hechicera (2018, Ecuavisa)- Luz María
