= Prisca Bustamante =

Peruvian-Ecuadorian actress

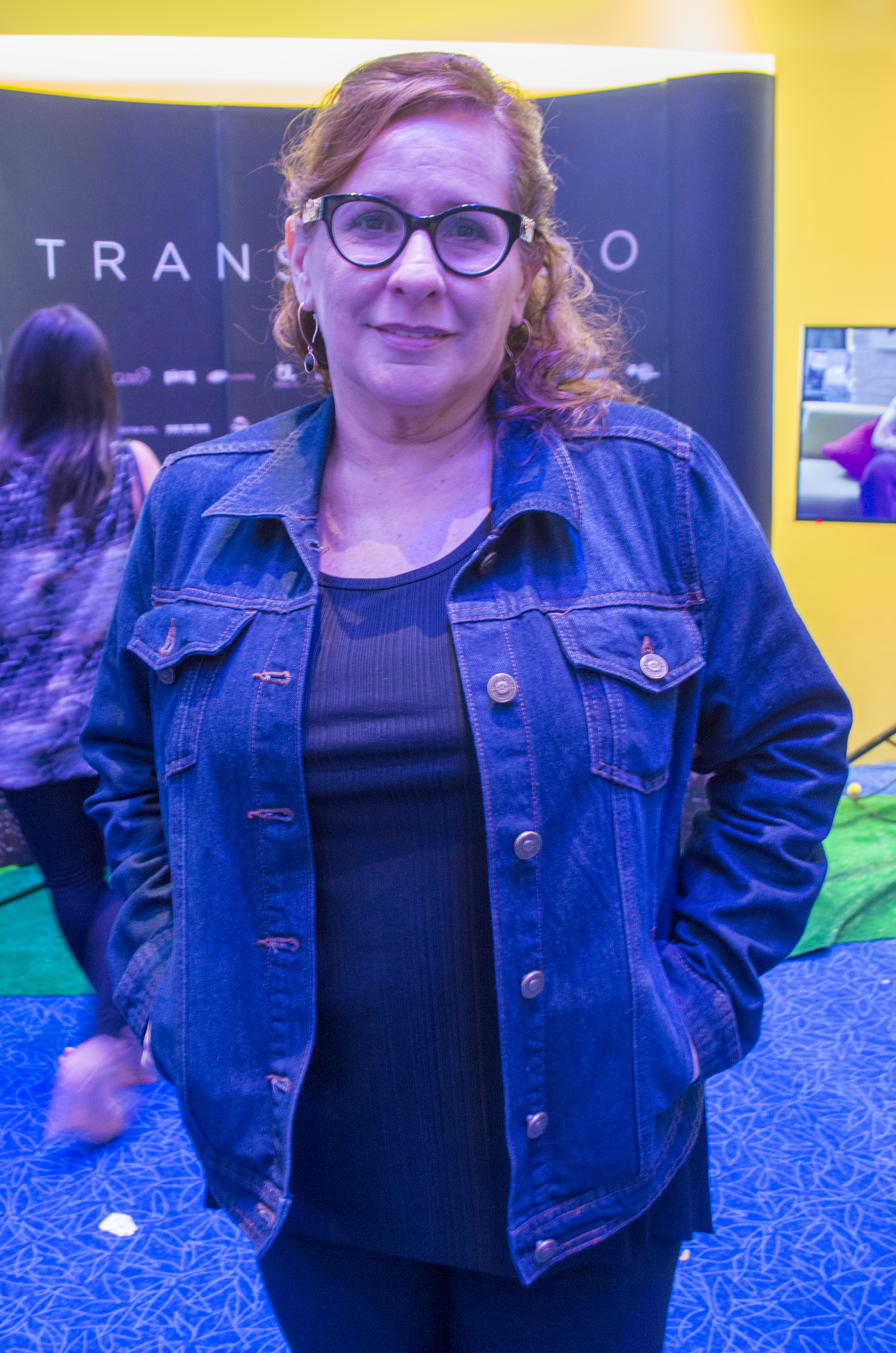
- Bustamante in 2016
- Born: 10 March 1964 (age 62); Lima, Peru
- Occupation: Actress

Prisca Bustamante (born 10 March 1964) is a Peruvian-Ecuadorian actress who has appeared in several Ecuadorian television shows, such as Tal para cual on Ecuavisa and Departamento 69 on Canal Uno.

== Early life ==
Prisca Bustamante was born in Lima on 10 March 1964. After graduating from school at age 16, she worked as a clothing seller at a department store in the Miraflores District of Lima. She also sold English courses, and worked as a babysitter during her exchange stay in Germany. She came to Ecuador to visit a friend, and decided to move there permanently.

== Career ==
=== Theater ===
Her friend introduced her to Marina Salvarezza, an Italian theater and television actress based in Ecuador, who gave Bustamante her first role, in the play The House of Bernarda Alba.

In 1987, she was cast in the play Blithe Spirit by Noël Coward, along with Martha Ontaneda, Marina Salvarezza, Jaime Roca, Julio César Andrade, and María del Carmen Montesdeoca.

In June 1989, she appeared in Les quatre vérités by Marcel Aymé at the Teatro Centro de Arte.

In 2012, she was in Las González by Hugo Saccoccia, a play that deals with the sexuality and desire of older women, directed by Andrés Garzón.

In 2013, she played María Callas, in Master Class by Terrence McNally, under the direction of Eduardo Muñoa.

In March 2017, Bustamante and Belén Idrovo presented the play El santo prepucio at the Pop Up Teatro - Café in central Urdesa. This ran without any problems. However, the same work met with controversy when put on at a theater in Samborondón. Protesters from Catholic groups arrived on 11 January 2018, along with policemen and authorities of the municipality, who shut down the show on the grounds that the premises did not have the correct operating permits. After establishing that the theater had the required permits, the play opened without incident.

=== Television ===
Bustamante made her television debut in the telenovela Valeria. Some time later she was head writer for the program Control remoto, hosted by Xavier Pimentel.

She had her first leading role in the Ecuavisa series Tal para cual, as Doña Bacha. She was next a protagonist in Dejémonos de vainas with Gonzalo Samper, Marco Ponce, Mabel Cabrera, Santiago Naranjo, and Martha Ormaza.

She starred in the comedy series Departamento 69 on Canal Uno, alongside Azucena Mora and Amparo Guillén.

In 2008, she joined TC Televisión, and was part of the comedy El Gabinete, along with Santiago Naranjo and Sharon la Hechicera. She next appeared on the series Corazón contento and the telenovelas El Garañón del Millón and Fanatikda.

In 2017, Bustamante and singer Nikki Mackliff were offered roles on the telenovela Lo Que está Pa Ti on GamaTV. However, the next day, after having had a reading of the script, she and Mackliff were summoned to the channel to be fired. Both expressed discontent over this on social networks, attributing it to their not being sympathizers of the political ideology of the Rafael Correa government, since the channel was seized by the state.

She was also part of the cast of 3 familias from Ecuavisa, as a guest in her first season, and as a recurring character from the second season, playing Cástula de Galindo. From 2018 to 2019, she was in the biographical telenovela Sharon la Hechicera.

In 2020, for the first time in her career, Bustamante played a villain in a telenovela, Antuca me enamora on TC Televisión.

=== Radio ===
Bustamante hosted the radio program Qué pasa with Mariela Viteri on Fuego 106.5 FM.

== Personal life ==
Bustamante has one son. She is an activist for animals, and puts out a calendar every year showing pets of the Patitas Foundation.

== Filmography ==
=== TV series and telenovelas ===
- Valeria (1990–1991)
- Una mujer (1991)
- Tal para cual (1991–1992) ... Doña Bacha
- Dejémonos de vainas (1991–1996) ... Renata Hermelinda Villegas de Vargas
- Isabela (1992–1993)
- Ángel o Demonio (1993–1994)
- Palabras al viento (1999–2000)
- Amores que matan (2005–2006)
- Departamento 69 (2006)
- El Gabinete (2008) ... La Pelu
- El Garañón del Millón (2008) ... Rosita
- Corazón contento (2009) ... Angustias
- Fanatikda (2010) ... Sol
- ¡Así pasa! (2013) ... Doña Débora de Narváez
- 3 familias (2014–2019) ... Cástula Posligua de Galindo
- La Trinity (2017–2018)
- Sharon la Hechicera (2018–2019) ... Cecilia de Corona
- Antuca me enamora (2020) ... Dorotea Petersen de Andrade
- Juntos y revueltos (2021) ... Consuelo
