= Jasú Montero =

Ecuadorian singer, presenter, and actress

- Born: Janeth Susana Montero Preciado; July 20, 1981 (age 43); Guayaquil, Ecuador
- Education: Colegio de Bellas Artes Juan José Plaza
- Occupation(s): Singer, presenter, actress
- Spouse: Ronny Castro (m. 2008; div. 2009)

Janeth Susana Montero Preciado (born July 20, 1981), known professionally as Jasú Montero, is an Ecuadorian singer, presenter, and actress.

== Early years ==
Montero was born in Guayaquil on July 20, 1981. She earned a licentiate in journalism at the Colegio de Bellas Artes Juan José Plaza.

== Career ==
In 2000, at age 19, she joined the musical group Kandela & Son, part of its second and third generation, along with Jordana Doylet, María Fernanda Ríos, Dora West, and manager Loly Ochoa. At the beginning she was inexperienced, but with a good musical ear, and had to learn body language, singing, tuning, music theory, dance, and choreography through rehearsals during her first six months, in addition to learning to wear heels and put on makeup, which she had not done before. She adopted the stage name Jasú for the group.

In 2006, she made her first foray into television when the group appeared on the TC Televisión contest program A todo dar.

In 2008, they had their own reality show called "En busca de la quinta Kandela (In Search of the Fifth Kandela)" on Gama TV.

Montero was the host of several entertainment programs, such as "Caiga quien caiga" on Canal Uno, alongside Marián Sabaté, and Vamos con todo on RTS.

She was a juror on the reality show "Oye mi canto" on Ecuavisa. She also participated in Bailando por un sueño, edición especial on Gama TV, and was part of TC Televisión's Soy el mejor VIP.

She had an antagonistic role in the comedy Los Hijos de Don Juan on TC Televisión, playing Ruperta Palomeque.

In 2016, she joined the cast of the TC Televisión program De casa en casa, sharing the stage with Ana Buljubasich and Carla Hall.

In 2014, she left Kandela & Son and became part of the group "Las Tr3s", with Jordana Doylet, Dora West, and manager Andrea Pesantez. Las Tr3s broke up in 2017.

== Personal life ==
Montero married Ronny Castro, the singer of the group Millenium, in 2008, and they divorced in 2009. She has one daughter.

== Filmography ==
=== TV series and telenovelas ===
Year(s)	Title	Role
2008	El Garañón del Millón	Cast
2008	El secreto de Toño Palomino	Herself
2009	Kandela	Jasú Cervantes
2015–2016	Los Hijos de Don Juan	Ruperta Palomeque
2015–2016	Los Hijos de Don Juan	Marimy

=== TV programs ===
Year(s)	Title	Role	Channel
2006	A todo dar	Presenter	TC Televisión
2007–2008	Caiga quien caiga	Presenter	Canal Uno
2010	En busca de la quinta Kandela	Presenter	Gama TV
2011	Kandela Pura	Presenter	Canal Uno
2012	Oye mi canto	Juror	Ecuavisa
2012	Vamos con todo	Presenter	RTS
2013	Canta si puedes	Juror	Ecuavisa
2014	Bailando por un sueño	Guest participant	Gama TV
2015	Soy el mejor VIP	Contestant	TC Televisión
2016-present	De casa en casa	Presenter	TC Televisión

== Discography ==
Montero has released the following singles through Universal Music Ecuador:

- "Yo Te Espero"
- "Iluso"
- "Rockolas" (feat. Jenny Rosero)
- "Me Siento Viva"
