= Marián Sabaté =

Ecuadorian television presenter

- Born: María de los Ángeles Sabaté Morán; 1 October 1966 (age 59); Barcelona, Spain
- Occupation(s): Television presenter, actress, producer
- Spouses: Marcelo Fernandes (divorced) Alejandro Kenig (divorced) Enrique “Kikín” Mero (m. 2011; div. 2019)
- Children: 2

María de los Ángeles Sabaté Morán (born 1 October 1966), better known as Marián Sabaté, is a Spanish-born Ecuadorian television presenter. She has been dedicated to informing people about Ecuadorian entertainment, from the 1990s to the present; She is also nicknamed as "La Reina de la Prensa Rosa(The Queen of the Pink Press)".

Sabaté began in Telesistema, currently RTS, during the 90s, with the variety program "¿Aló que tal? America", with Roberto Begué. She has made entertainment programs on various television channels such as Noche a noche with Marián on Canal Uno, along with Ángello Barahona, Pablo Mario Ansaldo "Antonella" and Carlos José Matamoros "El Paparazzi". Later, she was part of the program "Caiga que caiga", along with Ángello Barahona and Jasú Montero.

After being away for a period of time, Sabaté returned to television, this time in the program Jarabe de pico on Teleamazonas, where she shared the set with Nicolás Espinoza, Emerson Morocho as Miss Laura, Dora West, Paola Farías, among other personalities of showbiz.

== Early years ==
María de los Ángeles Sabaté was born in Barcelona, Spain on 1 October 1966 and at the age of 11, she emigrated to Ecuador for job opportunities for her parents, where she was nationalized and due to her charisma and attractive physique, she won several beauty pageants in different schools in which she attended, such as the Espiritu Santo School, also participating in several comic theatrical works of the school, thus learning to function on stage.
