= Carmen Angulo =

Ecuadorian actress (born 1970)

- Born: September 17, 1970 (age 54); Guayaquil, Ecuador
- Occupation: Actress

Carmen Angulo (born September 17, 1970) is an Ecuadorian actress.

== Biography ==
Carmen Angulo was born in Guayaquil on September 17, 1970, to an Afro-Ecuadorian family.

She studied social communication at the University of Guayaquil's Faculty of Social Sciences (FACSO), but dropped out in her third year to raise a family.

== Career ==
=== Television ===
Angulo's first television appearance was on the telenovela Blanco y negro, with Richard Barker, which was based on the racial problems of Afro-Ecuadorians. This led to roles on the Ecuavisa telenovelas Amores que matan and Yo vendo un ojos negros, working with actresses such as Maricela Gómez, Toty Rodríguez, and Giovanna Andrade.

She was on the dramatization program De la vida real, and made a special appearance on the telenovela El secreto de Toño Palomino.

On TC Televisión, she played Leticia on the comedy series Condominio, and later played Mónica on the telenovela Fanatikda.

She was also a member of the cast of the comedy Los Tostadams, a parody of The Addams Family, which was initially part of the program Granados en pijamas.

From 2013 to 2015, Angulo appeared on the telenovela Secretarias. On the comic series Los Hijos de Don Juan, she played Madame Trouché. She next had roles in the telenovelas Cuatro Cuartos, Calle amores, and Antuca me enamora.

=== Film ===
In 2007, Angulo was cast in the film El milagro de coromoto, the story of a religious miracle set in 17th-century Venezuela.

In 2011, she appeared in the successful low-budget film Prometeo deportado, directed by Fernando Mieles.

=== Theater ===
Angulo is part of the theatrical group Los compadritos del Parque Histórico, which works to preserve the culture of the Montubio and Afro-Ecuadorians.

== Other works ==
Angulo is a member of the Casa de la Cultura Ecuatoriana, and taught at a nursery school for the Central Bank's foundation El muchacho trabajador, with the aim of eradicating child labor. She has also given workshops on rights and duties that citizens must fulfill for the Ministry of Economic and Social Inclusion.

In 2012, Angulo announced that she, together with model Alexandra Mora and dancer Stalyn Vera, would be opening an art school named MAD in Babahoyo.

== Filmography ==
=== TV series and telenovelas ===
- Blanco y negro (2000)
- De la vida real (2001-2005)
- Yo vendo un ojos negros (2004)
- Amores que matan (2005)
- El secreto de Toño Palomino (2008-2009) ... Ginger's mother
- Fanatikda (2010-2011) ... Mónica
- Condominio (2011) ... Leticia
- Los Tostadams (2012) ... Grandmother
- Secretarias (2013-2015) ... Monze
- Los Hijos de Don Juan (2015-2016) ... Madame Trouché
- Cuatro Cuartos (2017-2018) ... Angelina Youlín Nazareno
- Maleteados (2018) ... Bella
- Calle amores (2019) ... Melina Molina
- Antuca me enamora (2020) ... Maritza Rizos

=== Film ===
- El milagro de Coromoto (2006) ... Ana
- Prometeo deportado (2011)
