= Priscilla Negrón =

Ecuadorian actress (born 1984)

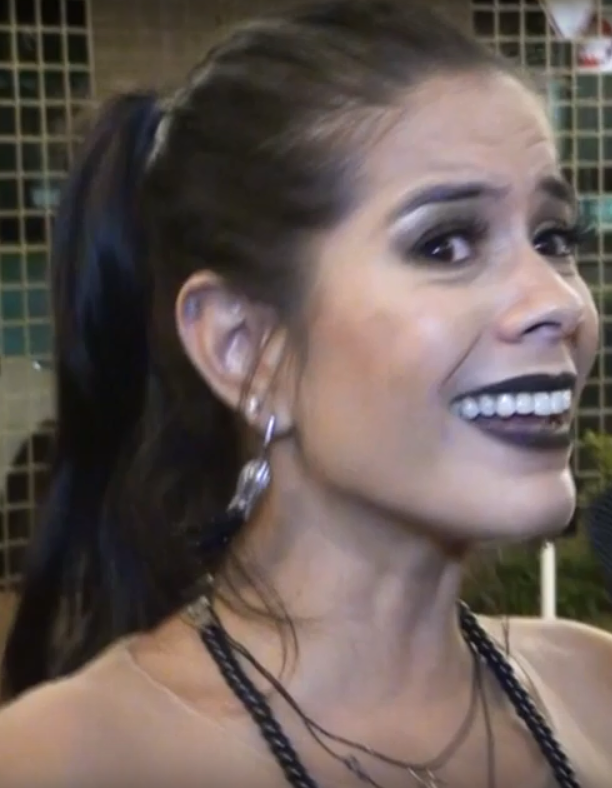
- Born: May 22, 1984 (age 40); Guayaquil, Ecuador
- Occupation: Actress

Priscilla Negrón (born May 22, 1984) is an Ecuadorian actress. She is known for appearing in successful TV series and telenovelas such as La pareja feliz, Sharon la Hechicera, and 3 familias, as well as plays such as La última cita.

== Biography ==
Priscilla Negrón was born in Guayaquil on May 22, 1984. She studied acting in Buenos Aires and in the United States. Her first television roles were in the Ecuavisa dramas De la vida real and Yo vendo un ojos negros. She moved into comedic acting in 2006, appearing on the series Kliffor, starring Richard Barker. The following year, she starred in the comedy El hombre de la casa alongside Xavier Pimentel, Alejandra Paredes, and Azucena Mora.

In 2009, she joined Teleamazonas, and was cast in the successful comedy La pareja feliz, playing Señora Negrón, one of the best friends of "La Mofle". This became one of her best-known roles. In 2010, she joined the cast of the telenovela Fanatikda on TC Televisión. In 2012, she returned to La pareja feliz in its third season, and remained with it until its conclusion in 2014.

In 2016, she played Luminitza in the series Los Hijos de Don Juan on TC Televisión.

In 2018, Negrón returned to Ecuavisa and appeared in the biographical telenovela Sharon la Hechicera, where she played Tere Bermeo, a character based on Tani Bermeo, the sister of the late singer Edith Bermeo, better known as Sharon. She reprised the role the following year in the second season (now known as Sharon 2: El desenlace), and joined the cast of the fifth season of the comedy 3 familias.

Negrón has also participated in theater, in productions such as La última cita with Andrés Garzón, and the Ecuadorian adaptation of the Venezuelan play A 2.50 la cuba libre.

== TV series and telenovelas ==
| Year | Title | Role |
|---|---|---|
| 2003 | De la vida real | Various characters |
| 2003 | Yo vendo un ojos negros | Cast |
| 2006 | Kliffor | Érika |
| 2007 | El hombre de la casa | Diana |
| 2009 | Mujeres asesinas | Cast |
| 2009–2014 | La pareja feliz | Señora Negrón |
| 2010–2011 | Fanatikda | Patricia |
| 2013 | Secretos | Ep. "Donde estás Amor como Luisa" |
| 2016 | Los Hijos de Don Juan | Luminitza |
| 2018–2019 | Sharon la Hechicera | Teresa "Tere" Bermeo Cisneros de Cajas |
| 2019–2020 | 3 familias | Carmen Concha de Tomalá (young) |
| 2019–2020 | 3 familias | Gina Tomalá Concha |
