= Paredes =

Paredes may refer to:

== Places ==
=== Angola ===
- Paredes, Angola, a town and commune in the province of Bengo

=== Portugal ===
- Paredes, Portugal, a municipality in the district of Porto
- Paredes (parish), a parish in the municipality of Paredes

=== Spain ===
- Paredes, Spain, a municipality in the province of Cuenca, in the autonomous community of Castile-La Mancha
- Paredes de Escalona, a municipality in the province of Toledo, in the autonomous community of Castile-La Mancha
- Paredes de Nava, a municipality in the province of Palencia, in the autonomous community of Castile and León
- Paredes de Sigüenza, a municipality in the province of Guadalajara, in the autonomous community of Castile-La Mancha
- Murias de Paredes, a municipality in the province of León, in the autonomous community of Castile and León

== Other uses ==
- Paredes (surname)
