= Maricela Gómez =

Ecuadorian actress (born 1976)

- Born: Maricela Monserrate Gómez; November 23, 1976 (age 48); Guayaquil, Ecuador
- Education: University of Guayaquil
- Occupation(s): Actress, presenter, pscyhologist
- Spouses: Patricio Moreno; Darío León (m. 2004; div. 2011)
- Partner: Gerardo Panchana (2014-present)

Maricela Monserrate Gómez (born November 23, 1976) is an Ecuadorian actress, television presenter, and psychologist.

== Biography ==
Maricela Gómez was born in Guayaquil on November 23, 1976. She began her acting career in the early 1990s as a member of the company of the Teatro Bambalinas, led by actor Raúl Varela. She made her television debut in 1993 as an extra in the telenovela Ángel o Demonio, produced by Ecuavisa. This led to roles in other productions such as Dulce tormento (1995) and María Soledad (1995).

She obtained greater public recognition in 1999, when she starred in the TC Televisión telenovela Emergencia.

In 2003, she appeared in the telenovela La Hechicera, playing an antagonist to the leads played by Sharon la Hechicera and Bernie Paz. The following year, she was part of the cast of the Ecuavisa telenovela Yo vendo un ojos negros.

In 2005, she made her debut as a television presenter, serving as a panelist for the business show Sharon y los especialistas, again sharing the screen with Sharon la Hechicera. In 2006, she starred in the telenovela Amores que matan, and in the same year she also starred in the comedy Kliffor alongside Richard Barker. In 2007, she starred as María in the successful youth series Súper Papá.

In 2008, Gómez returned to TC Televisión on the comic series El Gabinete, together with Santiago Naranjo, Prisca Bustamante, and, once again, Sharon la Hechicera. At the end of that year, she starred in the comedy Corazón contento.

In 2009, she joined the ranks of RTS as host of the morning show El Club de la Mañana, along with Marcelo Cornejo, María Gracia Manzano, and Sandra Pareja. Gómez remained with the show until its cancellation in early 2018.

In 2019, she returned to acting after 10 years, joining the biographical telenovela Sharon la Hechicera in its second season. Her character, Wilma Aguilar, is the prosecutor investigating the death of the singer Sharon.

In 2021, she made a special appearance on the TC Televisión series Juntos y revueltos, in which she played María Elena.

== Personal life ==
Gómez has three daughters from her first marriage, to actor Patricio Moreno.

She married fellow actor Darío León in October 2006. They divorced in 2009, but continued their relationship until 2011.

She has been in a romantic relationship with psychologist Gerardo Panchana since 2014.

She was diagnosed with fibromyalgia in 2011, for which she received treatments to calm the pain and recover. After her father's death due to stomach cancer, the actress completely changed her eating habits, in addition to avoiding high impact exercise routines and taking care of her skin with regard to makeup.

In 2018, Gómez graduated as a psychologist from the University of Guayaquil, also receiving the school's Contenta Award. As of 2020, she had largely left acting and was offering online therapy sessions during the COVID-19 pandemic.

== Filmography ==
=== TV series and telenovelas ===
- Ángel o Demonio (1993) ... extra
- Dulce tormento (1995)
- María Soledad (1995) ... Sonia
- Puerto Lucía (1997)
- Emergencia (1999–2002) ... Dr. Rosario Tama
- La Hechicera (2003) ... Juana
- Yo vendo un ojos negros (2004) ... Pilar
- Amores que matan (2005–2006) ... Norma de Altamirano
- Kliffor (2006)
- Súper Papá (2007) ... María
- El Gabinete (2008)
- Corazón contento (2008–2009)
- Sharon la Hechicera (2019) ... Fiscal Wilma Aguilar
- Juntos y revueltos (2021) ... Maria Elena

=== TV programs ===
- Sharon y los especialistas (2005) ... presenter
- El Club de la Mañana (2009–2018) ... presenter
