= Kandela & Son =

Ecuadorian female music group

- Origin: Guayaquil, Ecuador
- Genres: Cumbia, Tecnocumbia, reggaeton
- Years active: 1998–present
- Members: Brigitte Sosa; Susana Rivera; Blanka Stronner; Wendy Gómez
- Past members: Katty Elisa; Maggy Flores; Carla Ramírez; María Fernanda Ríos; Jasú Montero; Dora West; Jordana Doylet; Diana Guerrero; Katherine Bury; Dayanara Peralta

Kandela & Son is a female music group formed in 1998, being the first female vocal quintet in Ecuador.

== History ==
Kandela & Son group has changed their lineup several times with different groups of Ecuadorian singers, standing out for the permanent presence of Montero, Doylet and West. The manager of the original group from its inception to its transformation into Kandela 4G was Loly Ochoa.

The first generation of Kandela & Son consisted of Katty Elisa Lamilla, Maggie Flores, Karla and Dayra Ramírez and María Fernanda Ormaza. Their first studio album was titled "A mi modo" and it was released in 1999. Then in 2006, the most recognized lineup was assembled, in whom were Jasú Montero, Jordana Doylet, Dora West, Katherine Bury and Diana Guerrero; they entered projects outside the musical field, also combining with their productions.

Kandela & Son had a televised reality show called "Buscando a La Quinta Kandela" which aired on GamaTV in 2008, after which a new member, Kimberly Jaramillo, was added. In 2009, they carried out a television project about an inspired novel in its trajectory. The project was called "Kandela", the idea of Estefanía Isaías and Ignacio Sáinz. It consisted of 50 chapters, and was broadcast by TC Televisión. In 2011, they performed in the program "Kandela Pura" on Canal Uno for six months.

The fourth generation of Kandela & Son consisted of Dayanara Peralta, Blanca Sttroner, Lorena Gaibor and Brigitte Sosa in 2014. From this generation on, the group was renamed "Kandela 4G". The first single with this new lineup was titled "Su amor es music". After the departure of Gaibor and Peralta, singers Janan Velasco and Susana Rivera joined the group.
