= Paredes (surname) =

- Place of origin: Spain, Portugal

Paredes is a Spanish and Portuguese surname. Notable people with the surname include:

- Alejandra Paredes (born 1983), Ecuadorian actress
- Americo Paredes (1915–1999), Mexican-American author
- Ángela García de Paredes (born 1958), Spanish architect
- Armando Paredes (born 1984), Ecuadorian football player
- Artur Paredes (1899–1980), Portuguese guitarist
- Carlos Paredes (1925–2004), Portuguese guitarist
- Carlos Humberto Paredes (born 1976), Paraguayan football player
- Edward Paredes (born 1986), Dominican baseball player
- Enoli Paredes (born 1995), Dominican baseball player
- Esteban Paredes (born 1980), Chilean football player
- Frederico Paredes (1889–1972), Portuguese fencer
- Irene Paredes (born 1991), Spanish football player
- Isaac Paredes (born 1999), Mexican baseball player
- Javier Paredes (born 1980), Spanish football player
- Jennifer Paredes (born 1991), American actress
- Jim Paredes (born 1951), Filipino musician
- Jimmy Paredes (born 1988), Dominican baseball player
- Johnny Paredes (born 1962), Venezuelan baseball player
- Jonathan Paredes (disambiguation), several people
- Juan Carlos Paredes (born 1987), Ecuadorian football player
- Julieta Paredes (born c. 1967), Bolivian poet and writer
- Leandro Paredes (born 1994), Argentine football player
- Kevin Paredes (born 2003), American soccer player
- Mariano Paredes (1797–1849), President of Mexico 1845–1846
- Mariano Paredes (artist) (1912–1980), Mexican artist
- Mariano Paredes (President of Guatemala) (1800–1856)
- Marisa Paredes (1946–2024), Spanish actress
- Matías Paredes (born 1982), Argentine hockey player
- Mike Paredes (born 2000), American baseball player
- Pablo Paredes (born 1983), Spanish football player
- Quintín Paredes (1884–1973), Filipino lawyer, politician, and statesman, President of the Senate of the Philippines in 1952
- Rubén Darío Paredes (born 1933), military ruler of Panama, 1982–1983
- William Paredes (born 1985), Mexican footballer
- Yenifer Paredes (born 1995), Peruvian politician
