= Siguenza =

The name Siguenza or Sigüenza (the Spanish original spelling) can refer to:

- The Spanish city Sigüenza and the nearby Paredes de Sigüenza
- A family of Spanish origin, including the following notable individuals:
  - Carlos de Sigüenza y Góngora, Mexican colonial officer, author and polymath
  - Francis Siguenza, French racing cyclist
  - Herbert Siguenza, actor
  - Peter C. Siguenza, Guam's former Chief Justice
  - Ruben Siguenza, bassist in the band Mink DeVille
