= Negron =

Negron or Negrón is a Spanish language surname, and may refer to:

- Alondra Negron (born 1998), Puerto Rican middle-distance runner
- Angélica Negrón (born 1981), Puerto-Rican composer and multi-instrumentalist
- Antonio Negrón García (1940–2025), Puerto Rican jurist, associate justice of the Supreme Court (1974–2000)
- Carlos Negrón (born 1988), Puerto Rican boxer
- Carlos Negron (wrestler) (born 1964), Puerto Rican wrestler
- Chuck Negron (1942–2026), American singer-songwriter
- Edna Negron Rosario (born 1944), American educator
- Esmeralda Negron (born 1983), American-born Puerto Rican footballer and coach
- Frances Negrón-Muntaner (born 1966), Puerto Rican filmmaker, writer, and scholar
- Frankie Negrón (born 1977), singer of salsa music and songwriter of Puerto Rican descent
- Jaqueline Negron (born 1989), singer of Puerto Rican descent
- Joe Negron (born 1961), member of the Florida House of Representatives
- Kristopher Negrón (born 1986), American baseball player
- Laudiel Negrón (born 1952), Puerto Rican boxer
- Luis Negrón (born 1970), Puerto Rican writer
- Luz Negrón de Hutchinson (born 1919) Puerto Rican pianist
- Mercedes Negrón Muñoz (1895–1973), Puerto Rican poet and essayist
- Priscilla Negrón (born 1984), Ecuadorian actress
- Rick Negrón (born 1961) Puerto Rican Broadway, film and television actor, singer, dancer
- Taylor Negron (1957–2015), American stand-up comedian, actor, and artist
- Wilfredo Negrón (born 1973), Puerto Rican boxer
