= Los Hijos de Don Juan =

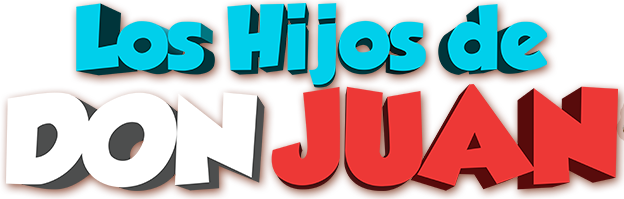
- Genre: Black-comedy; Sitcom; Mockumentary
- Created by: Fabrizzio Aveiga
- Starring: Víctor Aráuz; Leonardo Moreira; Sheryl Rubio; Isaam Eskandar; José Urrutia; María Fernanda Perez; Jonathan Montenegro
- Theme music composer: Sheryl Rubio
- Country of origin: Ecuador
- Original language: Spanish
- No. of seasons: 2
- No. of episodes: 205

Production
- Executive producers: Ana Franco; Ruth Coello
- Producers: Manuel Arias; José Navarrete
- Production locations: Guayaquil, Ecuador
- Camera setup: Single camera
- Running time: 20–24 minutes
- Production companies: TC Televisión (2015–2016)

Original release
- Network: TC Televisión
- Release: July 14, 2015 – December 23, 2016

Los Hijos de Don Juan is an Ecuadorian dark comedy-drama television series created by Fabrizio Aveiga for TC Televisión. The series represents the lives of four men, sons of the same father, and they discover him just when he dies, after leaving them in charge of his business. It premiered on July 15, 2015 on TC Televisión. In February 2016, TC Televisión renewed the show for a second season, which premiered on March 1, 2016.

== Premise ==
The series revolves around Francisco, Gonzalo, Salvador and Mauricio, the four are children of the same father and discover him just when he dies. After almost thirty years, four men discover that they are brothers. They are children of a womanizer, who never recognized them and who after his death inherits each of them, the administration of different premises of a shopping center. They know Sammy Silva, Don Juan's adopted daughter. These five children are forced to live together and work together, that's where a story of humor, love and entanglements begins, between them and the employees of the shopping center.

== Cast ==
=== Main ===
- Victor Araúz as Francisco Silva "Paco"
- Leonardo Moreira as Gonzalo Silva "Chalo"
- Isaam Eskandar as Salvador Silva
- Jose Urrutia as Mauricio Silva "Chicho"
- Maria Fernanda Perez as Sammy Silva
- Jasú Montero as Ruperta Palomeque
- Sofia Caiche as Zoila Bella
- Mayra Jaime as Maria Jose Patino "Pepa"
- Jose Corozo as Chavorino
- Sheryl Rubio as Malibu (season 2)
- Carmen Angulo as Madame Trouche
- Santiago Naranjo as Juan Silva
- Jonathan Montenegro as Amir Santander (season 2)

=== Recurring ===
- Joselyn Gallardo as Juliett Peralta (season 2)
- David Reinoso as Kassandro / Francisco Silva "Paco"
- Claudia Camposano as Saskia Mena Mora
- Elena Gui as Sara María
- Juan José Jaramillo as Gustavo
- Génesis Aviles as Amelia Silva
- Jessica Ibáñez as Mamaza
- Flor María Palomeque as "La Mofle"
- Alex Vizuete as Francisca "Paca" (season 2)
- Santiago Naranjo as Juan Silva (season 1)
- Priscilla Negrón as Luminitza (season 2)

== Production ==
=== Development ===
The series was created, produced and written by Fabrizzio Aveiga for TC Televisión. The series is the first comedy produced by TC Televisión.

The series premiered on TC Televisión on July 14, 2015. The production of the series began on March 14, 2015 in Guayaquil, Ecuador, at the beginning a season of 20 episodes was recorded, but after seeing the success obtained on TC Television, decided to record more episodes of the series and renew the series for a second season. On March 1, 2016, the second season of the series was released.

== Episodes ==
Season	Episodes	Originally released
1	131	14 June 2015
2	74	10 February 2016
