= Ruth Coello =

Ecuadorian actor and director

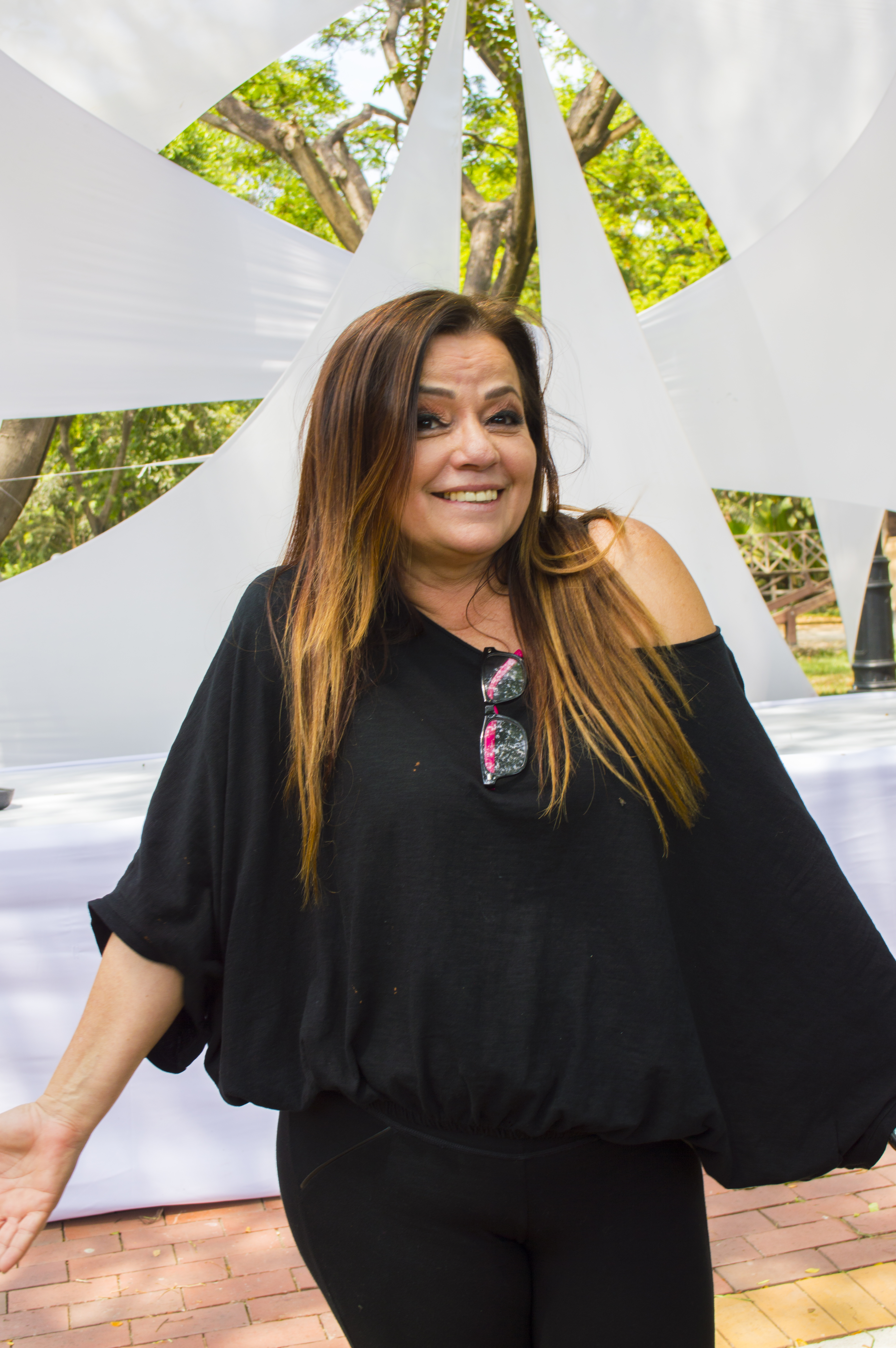
- Ruth Coello
- Born: Guayaquil
- Occupations: Actress, television director
- Spouse: Hugo Avilés

Ruth Coello is an Ecuadorian television and theater actress and director specializing in improvisation. She is married to a childhood friend, Hugo Avilés, and they have two children.

== Biography ==
Ruth Coello was born in and spent much of her early life in the Astillero, but moved to the northern area of the city. During the 1980s, while studying architecture in university, Coello took a 3-month theater class with a childhood friend and future husband, Hugo Avilés, and played in José Martínez Queirolo's play Los vampiros. Though she did not merit much attention, Coello and Avilés dropped out of college to pursue careers in theater. Eventually, the couple formed the improvisational theater group Fantoche.

== First years ==
Her first steps in acting were at Jehovah's Witness meetings, where she acted as a dramatist because she was always chosen as the youngest. She did drama at school, even though she did not attract much attention.

During the 1980s, Ruth was in her fourth year of architecture, and decided to join, together with her then neighbourhood friend Hugo Avilés with whom she met again and who was also studying architecture at another university, a three-month theatre course, and then took part in the play Los vampiros by the playwright José Martínez Queirolo. From that moment on, the theater was her passion, then he left her university career and dedicated herself to the theater with Hugo Avilés. Also with Hugo and several fellow actors, and later with their children, they formed the theater group Fantoche, dedicated to Impro.

== Career ==
Coello made her television debut in an episode of Ecuavisa's De la vida real on serial killer Daniel Camargo Barbosa and would continue to appear in many dramatizations in that series. She also appeared as a guest on TC Televisión's Archivos del destino and played in Solteros sin compromiso and Historias personales. In 2005, Coello made a brief appearance on the soap opera Corazón Dominado and two years later played in another, RedTeleSistema's Cholicienta, as Doña Victoria. Later that year, she created the telenovelas Kandela and Mostro de Amor, both broadcast on Teleamazonas.

In 2010 she directed the play Los pintores no tienen recuerdos, a theatrical adaptation of the literary work of the same name by the Italian Dario Fo.

In 2012 she had her first starring role in the Ecuadorian version of the Spanish series Aida, by Teleamazonas, where she worked with her son Adrián Avilés. In July, she played an old woman, married to a young man for whom she is willing to please him, in the play Mujeres soñaron caballos, by the Argentinean Daniel Veronese.

In 2013, she was part of the cast of Estas Secrearias de TC Televisión, playing the role of Analía Argudo, the dinosaur secretary. That same year she participated in the chapter Con mi corazón te espero in the series Secretos de Ecuavisa. She played Dora in the play La Niña Jamón by the Argentine playwright Laura Eva Avelluto.

In early 2014, she directed the play Monogamia, by Chilean playwright and psychiatrist Marco Antonio de la Parra, and her son Adrián was the producer.

In 2015 she becomes the stage director of the series Los hijos de Don Juan.
