= Luzmila Nicolalde =

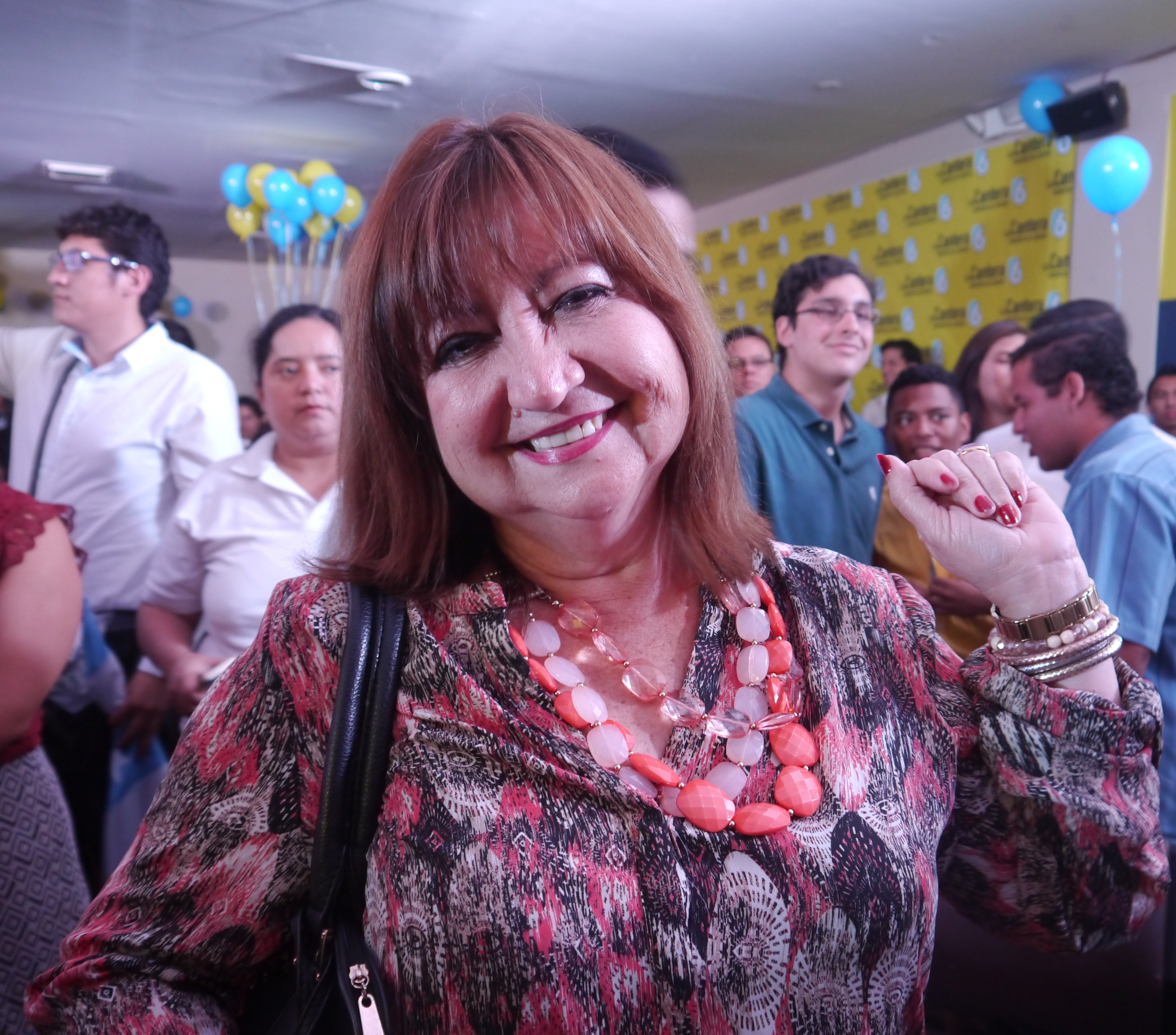
- Muzmila Nicolalde in 2016

Municipal Council of Guayaquil
- Incumbent
- Assumed office 2014

Viceprefect of the Province of Guayas
- In office 2009–2013
- Succeeded by: Cristina Nivelo Harb

National Congress of Ecuador
- In office 2007–2007

Personal details
- Born: Luzmila Nicolalde Cordero; 1 June 1957 (age 68) Guayaquil
- Party: Social Christian Party
- Spouse: Heinz Baumann
- Occupation: TV presenter and politician

Luzmila Nicolalde Cordero (born 1 June 1957) is an Ecuadorian TV presenter and politician, being the current Councillor for the Municipality of Guayaquil. She is one of the most experienced personalities in Ecuadorian television, with more than 36 years in the industry.

== Biography ==
Luzmila Nicolalde, born 1 June 1957 in Guayaquil, entered the world of television at age 13, appearing on TC Televisión's Panorama infantil to sing. Later, she would also appear on La discoteca de Pepe Parra, then on Chispazos, running since 1987.

Nicolalde made her first foray into politics when she was elected to the National Congress of Ecuador in the 2006 legislative elections, representing the Patriotic Society Party. She was dismissed from her position by the Supreme Electoral Tribunal during the 2007 legislative crisis at the request of President Rafael Correa in order to establish the Ecuadorian Constituent Assembly. In 2009, Nicolalde emerged as a primary candidate for the Mayor of Guayaquil for the Patriotic Society Party, and she announced her intention to run. However, the PSP denied any support for Nicolalde, instead backing Jaime Nebot for reelection.
