= Sandra Pareja =

Ecuadorian actress

- Born: 1966/1967; Guayaquil, Ecuador
- Education: National University of Cuyo
- Occupation: Actress
- Spouse: Jorge Ballesteros

Sandra Pareja (born 1966/1967) is an Ecuadorian actress, best known for her role in the Ecuavisa television series Mis adorables entenados. She began her acting career at age 16 in the theater group El Juglar, and has appeared at Teatro El Ángel with the group La Mueca. She has also appeared on TV series such as Súbete a mi taxi on RTS.

== Early life ==
Sandra Pareja was born in Guayaquil in 1966 or 1967. She took acting classes at age 16 with El Juglar. She remained with the group for 15 years.

== Career ==
She took courses in biochemistry and pharmaceutical chemistry before completing her 5-year studies of dramatic arts at the National University of Cuyo in Mendoza, Argentina. She began teaching acting in schools, colleges and universities, in addition to teaching physical expression for companies and institutions.

Throughout her career, Pareja has taken part in productions by La Mueca theater group, together with Oswaldo Segura, Amparo Guillén, Héctor Garzón, and Andrés Garzón, at Teatro El Ángel.

She made her television debut in 1987, in the Ecuavisa costumbrista series, Mis adorables entenados. Her character, Maribel la Virola, is the neighbor who is madly in love with Felipe Vera, played by Oswaldo Segura. She reprised this role in 1995 on Mis adorables entenados con billete, a continuation of the previous series but for RTS. On the same channel, she appeared in the series Súbete a mi taxi and Rosendo Presidente, again playing Maribel in the latter. In the early 2000s, she was in Ecuavisa's comic series Visa para un sueño. She was also part of La escuelita sketches on the show business program Vamos con todo.

In 2008, she played Yuli Bajaña in El Garañón del Millón on TC Televisión. The same year she appeared in the play Ovarios.

From 2010 to 2020, Pareja was part of the RTS morning magazine El club de la Mañana, where she played a reporter named Sarota, as well as the character Sarita "Doña Sari" Piedad, an outgoing elderly woman.

== Personal life ==
Sandra Pareja is married to Jorge Ballesteros, with whom she has one daughter.

== Filmography ==
=== TV series and telenovelas ===
- Mis adorables entenados (1989-1991) ... Maribel "La Virola"
- Mis adorables entenados con billete (1995–1997) ... Maribel "La Virola"
- Súbete a mi taxi (1997–1999) ... Maribel "La Virola"
- Visa para un sueño (2001)
- Rosendo Presidente (2006) ... Maribel "La Virola"
- El Garañón del Millón (2008) ... Yuli

=== TV programs ===
- El Show de Felipe (1999)
- Vamos con todo (2004-2008)
- El club de la mañana (2010-2020) ... Sarita Piedad "Doña Sari"
