= Paola Farías =

Ecuadorian model, actress, and singer

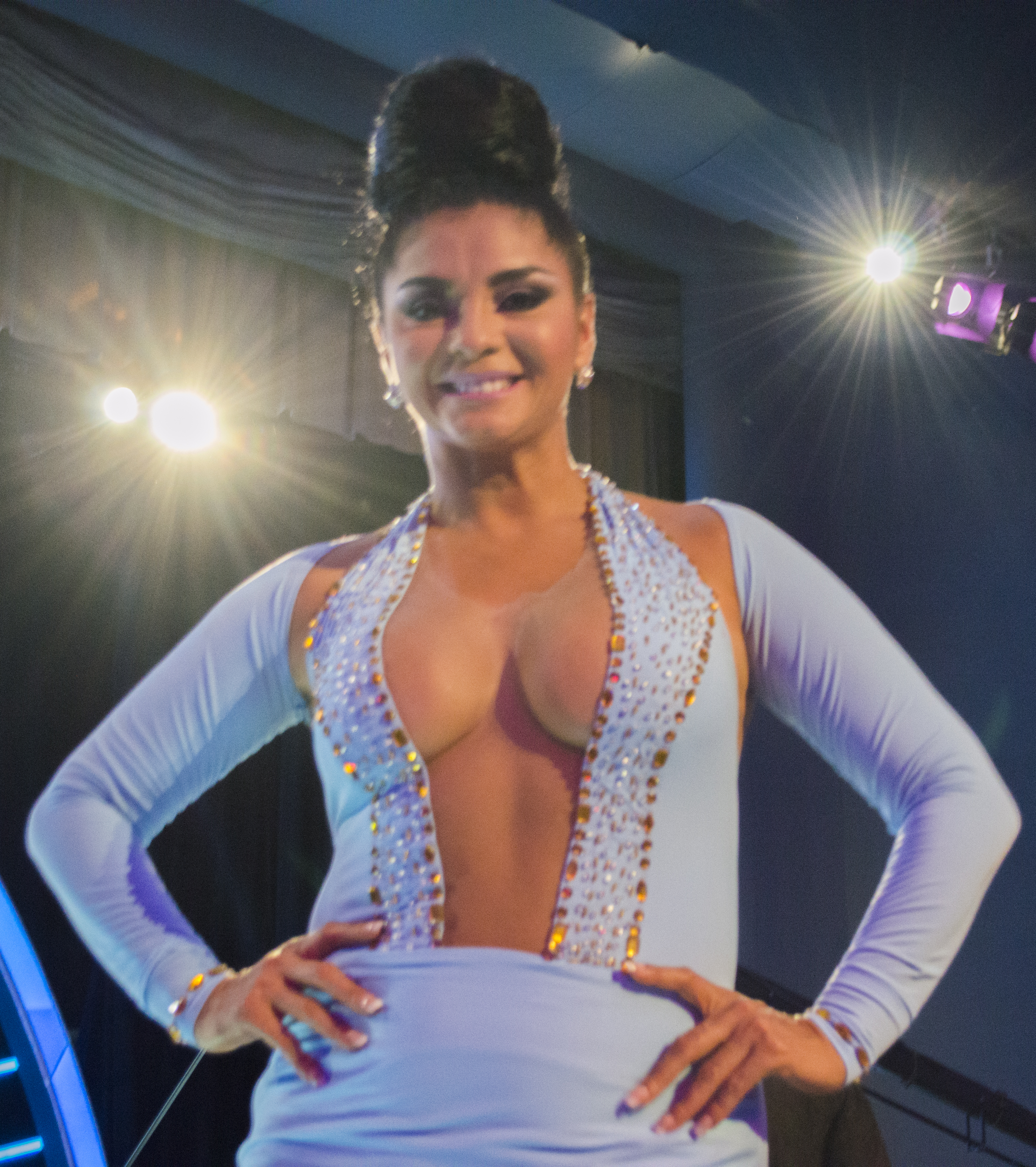
- Born: Paola Anabella Farías Alvarez; 25 June 1974 (age 50); Esmeraldas, Ecuador
- Occupation(s): Model, actress, singer
- Years active: Since 1995
- Spouse: Gustavo Navarro (divorced)

Paola Anabella Farías Alvarez, nicknamed La Cocotera (b. 25 June 1974), is an Ecuadorian model, actress, and singer.

== Early life ==
Paola Farías was born in Esmeraldas, Ecuador on 25 June 1974.

== Personal life ==
She was married to Ecuadorian television personality Gustavo Navarro, and they had a daughter.

In 2008, she remarried to Xavier Moncayo, but had her second divorce on 27 December 2012.

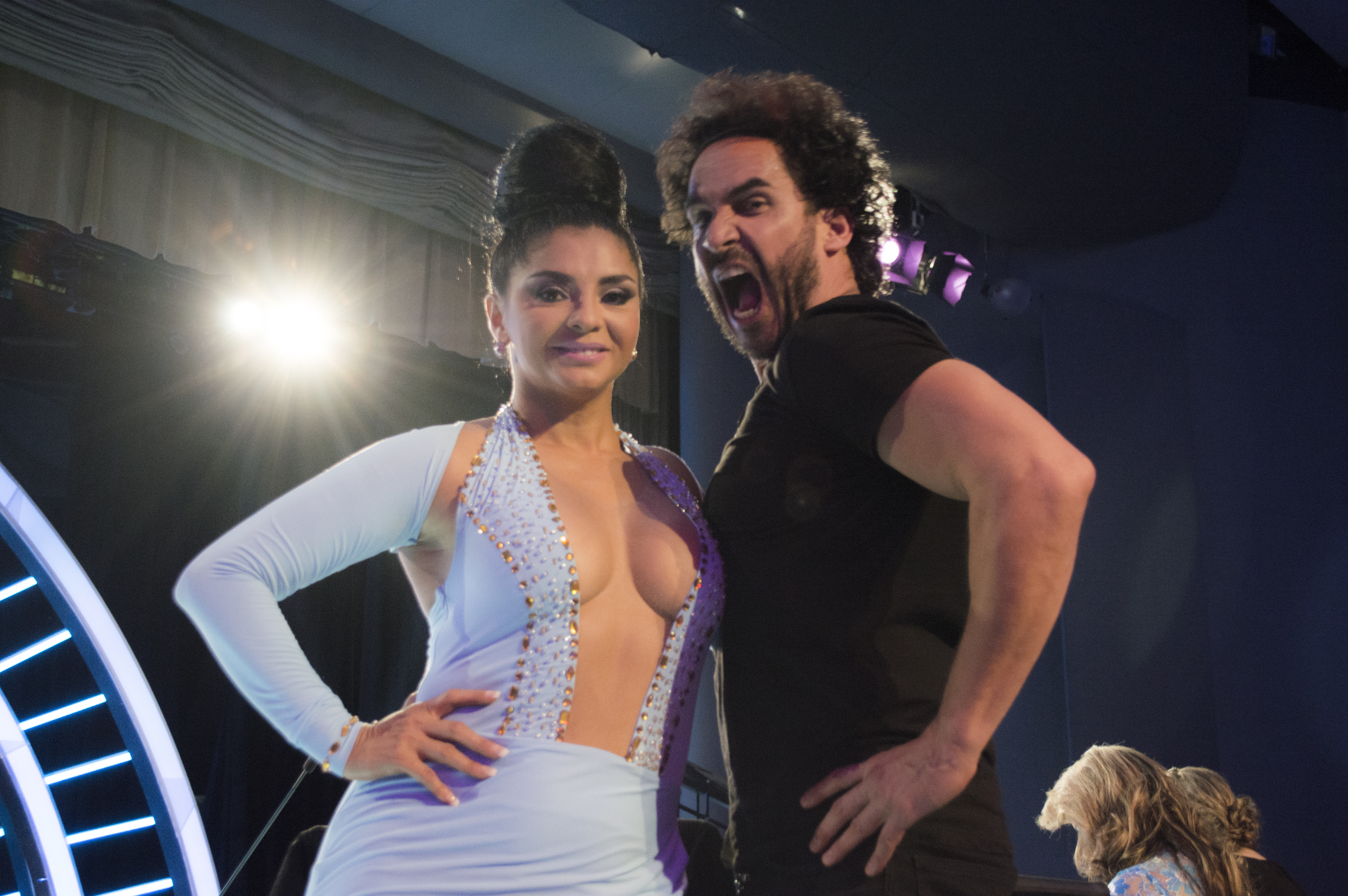
Paola Farías and Fabrizzio Ferreti as judges on Ecuador's Got Talent 3, 26 October 2014.

== Career ==
Farías began her television career in 1995 with Bernard Fougères on Ecuavisa's El show de Bernard as a model. The next year, she appeared as a model on SiTV programs such as Guayaquil Caliente, Todos a Bailar, and Playa Fantasía. Other Canal Uno productions that Farías played in include Juego de manos, Ídolos de la bola, Fantasías en la Playa, Las travesuras de Pepito and Palabras al Viento. For four years, she was a member of the musical group Las Perlas del Pacífico.

In 2000, Farías left Canal Uno to begin her career in solo singing and reentered the television world the next year for the TC Televisión shows Emergencia and A flor de piel as an actress Todos a bailar and as a cheerleader.

She achieved fame as the protagonist of Ecuador's version of The Nanny in 2006.
