= Gran Hermano del Pacífico =

Season of television series

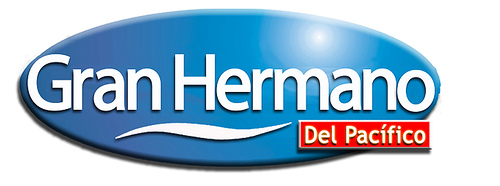
- Presented by: Lorena Meritano (Main); Álvaro Ballero and Álvaro García (Chile); Janine Leal (Ecuador); Juan Francisco Escobar (Peru)
- No. of days: 106
- No. of housemates: 19
- Winner: Juan Sebastián
- Runner-up: Leito

Release
- Original network: Telesistema (Ecuador); Red TV (Chile); ATV (Peru)
- Original release: 11 June – 24 September 2005

Gran Hermano del Pacífico is a television program based on the international Big Brother format produced in the Netherlands by Endemol. It involved three countries within South America (Ecuador, Chile and Peru).

The first season started on 11 June 2005 and finished on 24 September 2005 with a total duration of 106 days. The house was located in Bogotá, Colombia. 18 housemates entered the house and the winner was Juan Sebastián and the finalist was Leito. There are no plans for a second season.

== Housemates ==
Name	Age	Occupation	Hometown
Augusto Alvarez Penaranda		Administration	Lima
Bertha Alicia Rodriguez	26	Student	Lima
Claudio Andres Rodriguez	25		Chile
Gabriela Maria Torres	27	Psychoeducation	Quito
Gianmarco Retis	26	-	Lima
Jaren Hidalgo	27	Singer	Lima
Jessica Angulo	23	Model	Esmeraldas
José Luis Maldonado	26	Designer	Machala
Juan Sebastián López	23	Model	Quito
Katia Sáez			Chile
Kattya Denise Tamayo Ruiz		Communicator	Guayaquil
Leito Monteverde (Eduardo)	27	Teacher and actor	Lima
Liliana Langer	25	Seller	Chile
Pamela Hinzpeter	32		Chile
Roberto Manuel Mansilla	22	Designer	Guayaquil
Romina Ramos	25		Santiago
Teobaldo Álvarez	25	Political advisor	Chile
Viviana Andrade	31	Actress	Lima

== Nominations table ==
	Week 2	Week 3	Week 4	Week 5	Week 6	Week 7	Week 8	Week 9	Week 10	Week 11	Week 12	Week 13	Week 14		Week 15 Final	
	Week 2	Week 3	Week 4	Week 5	Week 6	Week 7	Week 8	Week 9	Week 10	Week 11	Week 12	Week 13	Secret Garden	Ex-housemates	Week 15 Final	
Juan-Sebastián	Claudio, Leito	Claudio, Leito	Claudio, Leito	Bertha, Romina	José, Leito	Leito, Romina	Leito, Liliana	Gabriela, Gianmarco	Jessica, Leito	Jessica, Leito	Augusto, Kattya	No; Nominations	Not; Eligible	No; Nominations	Winner (Day 106)	
Leito	Claudio, Gianmarco	Juan, Pamela	Juan, Teobaldo	Juan, Teobaldo	Juan, Toebaldo	Gianmarco, Juan	Juan, Liliana	Gabriela, Leito	Juan, Teobaldo	Juan, Teobaldo	Juan, Romina	No; Nominations	Not; Eligible	No; Nominations	Runner-Up (Day 106)	
Romina	Jessica, Leito	Bertha, Gabriela	Bertha, Juan	Bertha, Romina	Juan, Viviana	Gianmarco, Juan	Gianmarco, Juan	Gianmarco, Gianmarco	Gabriela, Leito	Gebriela, Leito	Augusto, Kattya	No; Nominations	In Secret; Garden	No; Nominations	Third place (Day 106)	
Gabriela	Bertha, Pamela	Bertha, Pamela	José, Leito	Bertha, Romina	José, Leito	Juan, Leito	Jarén, Liliana	Jarén, Teobaldo	Jarén, Romina	Jarén, Romina	Augusto, Kattya	No; Nominations	Not; Eligible	No; Nominations	Fourth place (Day 106)	
Jarén	Claudio, Pamela	Jessica, Pamela	Juan, Teobaldo	Juan, Teobaldo	Gianmarco, Teobaldo	Gianmarco, Juan	Gianmarco, Teobaldo	Juan, Teobaldo	Gabriela, Teobaldo	Gabriela, Teobaldo	Evicted (Day 78)		Not; Eligible	Nominated	Fifth place (Day 106)	
Teobaldo	Leito, Roberto	Gabriela, Leito	Jessica, Leito	Bertha, José	José, Leito	Gabriela, Gianmarco	Gabriela, Gianmarco	Jarén, Jarén	Jarén, Jessica	Evicted (Day 71)			Not; Eligible	Nominated	Re-Evicted (Day 99)	
Gianmarco	Leito, Roberto	José, Pamela	José, Leito	Bertha, José	José, Viviana	Leito, Romina	Leito, Liliana	Jarén, Leito	Evicted (Day 64)				Not; Eligible	Nominated	Re-Evicted (Day 99)	
Jessica	Claudio, Leito	Claudio, Jarén	Claudio, Leito	Bertha, José	José, Leito	Juan, Viviana	Gianmarco, Liliana	Gianmarco, Juan	Jarén, Toebaldo	Jarén, Teobaldo	Augusto, Kattya	No; Nominations	In Secret; Garden	Evicted (Day 99)		
Kattya	Not In; House							In Secret; Garden		Jarén, Jessica	Leito, Romina	No; Nominations	Evicted (Day 92)			
Augusto	Not In; House							In Secret; Garden		Jarén, Jessica	Kattya, Romina	Evicted (Day 85)				
Katia	Not In; House							In Secret; Garden	Evicted (Day 64)							
Liliana	Gabriela, Leito	José, Leito	José, Leito	Bertha, Juan	Jessica, Viviana	Gabriela, Gianmarco	Juan, Leito	Evicted (Day 57)								
Viviana	José, Pamela	Juan, Pamela	Juan, Liliana	Bertha, Juan	Gianmarco, José	Gianmarco, Romina	Evicted (Day 50)									
José-Luis	Leito, Romina	Gabriela, Leito	Claudio, Leito	Bertha, Juan	Toebaldo, Viviana	Evicted (Day 43)										
Bertha	Claudio, Roberto	Juan, Pamela	Juan, Teobaldo	Juan, Teobaldo	Evicted (Day 36)											
Claudio	José, Leito	José, Leito	Jessica, Leito	Evicted (Day 29)												
Pamela	Roberto, Viviana	Jessica, Leito	Evicted (Day 22)													
Roberto	José, Leito	Evicted (Day 15)														
Notes	None	^{1}	^{2}	^{3}	^{4}	^{5}	^{6}	^{7}, ^{8}	^{9}	^{10}	^{11}	^{12}, ^{13}	^{14}	^{15}	^{16}	
Nominated For Eviction	Claudio, Leito, Roberto	Gabriela, Leito, Pamela	Claudio, José, Leito	Bertha, José, Juan	José, Teobaldo, Viviana	Juan, Leito, Viviana	Gianmarco, Juan, Liliana	Gianmarco, Jarén, Juan	Jarén, Leito, Teobaldo	Jarén, Juan, Leito	Augusto, Kattya, Leito	Gabriela, Jessica, Juan, Kattya, Leito, Romina	Jessica, Romina	Gianmarco, Jarén, Teobaldo	Gabriela, Jarén, Juan, Leito, Romina	
Evicted	Roberto; 32.54% to save	Pamela; 30.94% to save	Claudio; 32.18% to save	Bertha; 27.70% to save	José; 32.26% to save	Viviana; 18.92% to save	Liliana; 31.85% to save	Gianmarco; 21.52% to save	Teobaldo; 31.51% to save	Jarén; 29.02% to save	Augusto; 10.96% to save	Kattya; 7.86% to save	Jessica; 40.05% to save	Gianmarco; 22.94% to save	Jarén; 4.41% to win	Gabriela; 6.06% to win
Evicted	Roberto; 32.54% to save	Pamela; 30.94% to save	Claudio; 32.18% to save	Bertha; 27.70% to save	José; 32.26% to save	Viviana; 18.92% to save	Liliana; 31.85% to save	Katia; Jessica's choice to evict	Teobaldo; 31.51% to save	Jarén; 29.02% to save	Augusto; 10.96% to save	Jessica; 16.54% to fake evict	Jessica; 40.05% to save	Teobaldo; 37.28% to save	Romina; 26.42% to win	Leito; 29.99% to win
Evicted	Roberto; 32.54% to save	Pamela; 30.94% to save	Claudio; 32.18% to save	Bertha; 27.70% to save	José; 32.26% to save	Viviana; 18.92% to save	Liliana; 31.85% to save	Katia; Jessica's choice to evict	Teobaldo; 31.51% to save	Jarén; 29.02% to save	Augusto; 10.96% to save	Romina; 17.76% to fake evict	Jessica; 40.05% to save	Teobaldo; 37.28% to save	Juan; 33.13% to win	

=== Notes ===
- ^1 The maximum number of Housemates that can be Nominated at any one time is three. If there is a tie the Housemate with the most Nominations so far in the game is Nominated. This Week Leito (6) and Pamela (6) were Nominated, and Gabriela, José and Juan drew next with 3 each. José had the most Nominations so far (including all Weeks) and was hence Nominated. However, last Week's Evictee Roberto was given the chance to save one of the Nominated Housemates and chose to save José, meaning that Gabriela took up his place in the Nomination line-up.
- ^2 Claudio, Juan and Leito were initially Nominated, however Pamela saved Juan and José dropped into his place.
- ^3 This Week Housemates Nominated in four teams of three. Teams were as follows: Bertha, Jarén and Leito (Yellow Team), Gabriela, Juan and Romina (Blue Team), Gianmarco, Jessica and Teobaldo (Purple Team) and José, Liliana and Viviana (Orange Team). Each team Nominated together, and their two Nominations counted for just one point each. Bethra, José and Juan were Nominated, and evictee Claudio decided not to save any of them.
- ^4 José, Leito and Viviana were initially Nominated. Evictee Betha saved Leito, and Teobaldo took her place with the next highest number of Nominations (3).
- ^5 This Week the first four Evictees (Bertha, Claudio, Pamela and Roberto) were allowed one Nomination each. They chose Toebaldo (Bertha), Viviana (Claudio), Gianmarco (Pamela) and Liliana (Roberto). Gianmarco, Juan and Leito were initially Nominated, but José-Luis (Evictee number five) chose to save Gianmarco, and Viviana took their place.
- ^6 Gianmarco, Leito and Liliana were initially nominated, however Viviana saved Leito and Juan took their place.
- ^7 This Week the Housemates Nominated in eight groups of two, depending upon with of the Pacifico countries they came from. Each Housemate nominated twice, in two different pairs. Gianmarco, Jarén and Juan Sebastián were Nominated, and Evitee Liliana chose not to save any of them.
- ^8 Shortly following Liliana's Eviction three new Housemates (Augusto, Katia and Kattya) moved into the Secret Garden. Jessica had to Evict one of them, and chose Katia.
- ^9 Jarén, Leito and Teobaldo were initially Nominated, and as Gianmarco chose not to save any of them, they all faced the Public Vote.
- ^10 New Housemates Augusto and Kattya were Immune, and could Nominate but not be Nominated. Jarén, Juan-Sebastián and Leito were Nominated and Teobaldo chose not to save any of them.
- ^11 Augusto, Kattya and Romina were Nominated, and after Jarén saved Romina Leito took their place.
- ^12 All Housemates were automatically Nominated. The Housemate with the least save votes would leave the House, and the next two Housemates with the least save votes would enter the Secret Garden. Kattya had the least save votes and was Evicted. Jessica and Romina were the two next least popular Housemates and entered the Secret Garden.
- ^13 Viewers were given the choice of five Evicted Housemates to return to the House for the final Week (Gianmarco, Jarén, Liliana, Teobaldo and Viviana). The three with the most votes would return to the House. The Public chose Teobaldo (29.79%), Jarén (23.89%) and Gianmarco (22.69%) to return and they re-entered after Kattya's Eviction and Jessica & Romina's fake Evictions. Lilliana (19.26%) and Viviana (4.37%) missed out on the chance to return.
- ^14 The two Housemates moved to the Secret Garden (Jessica & Romina) faced the Public Vote, and only one of them could return for the final night.
- ^15 Of the three returned Evicted Housemates only one could stay for the final night and hence Gianmarco, Jarén and Teobaldo all faced the Public vote. The one of them with the most save votes would stay in the House for final night.
- ^16 The final five Housemates all automatically faced the Public Vote to win.
