= Azucena Mora =

Ecuadorian actress (1945–2026)

- Born: Livia Lidia Mora Mendoza; October 21, 1945; Milagro, Ecuador
- Died: July 14, 2026 (aged 80)
- Occupation: Actress

Livia Lidia Mora Mendoza (October 21, 1945 – July 14, 2026), better known by the stage name of Azucena Mora, was an Ecuadorian theater and television actress who achieved notoriety with her performance as Petita Pacheco in the television series Tal para cual produced by Ecuavisa. She was a public servant for the Ecuadorian Ministry of Culture.

== Life and career ==
Azucena Mora was born Livia Lidia Mora Mendoza in Milagro, Ecuador, but her mother and relatives called her Azucena. She established herself at school, where she sang and performed, but at age 12 moved away to Guayaquil. Azucena studied for three years at the Theater School of the House of Culture in Guayaquil. At 32, she joined the theater group El Juglar.

From 1990 to 1992, she starred as Petita Pacheco in Ecuavisa's series Tal para cual, alongside Mimo Cava and Prisca Bustamante. Azucena also played in the Ecuavisa productions Yo vendo unos ojos negros, El hombre de la casa, and in 2016 appeared on the Ecuadorian telenovela 3 familias, again playing with Mimo Cava and Prisca Bustamente. Azucena, working with Virgilio Valero, produced Contigo pan y cebolla.

Azucena also participated in the TV show “De La Vida Real”

Azucena was married for 15 years. She died on July 14, 2026, at the age of 80.

== Filmography ==
- Por amor propio
- Los que vendrán
- Tal para cual (1991–1992)
- Ángel o Demonio (1993)
- Dulce tormento (1994)
- La Hechicera
- Yo vendo unos ojos negros (2004)
- El hombre de la casa (2007)
- 3 familias (2014)
