= Ricardo Mórtola =

Ecuadorian architect (1951-2014)

Ricardo Mórtola Di Puglia (c. 1950 – 22 April 2014) was an Ecuadorian architect and businessman. He was known for constructing Estadio Monumental Isidro Romero Carbo in Barcelona. He won many awards during his twenty-year career. He was born in Guayaquil, Ecuador.

Mórtola died in Guayaquil, Ecuador from testicular cancer, aged 63.
