= Amparo Guillén =

Ecuadorian actress (1953–2024)

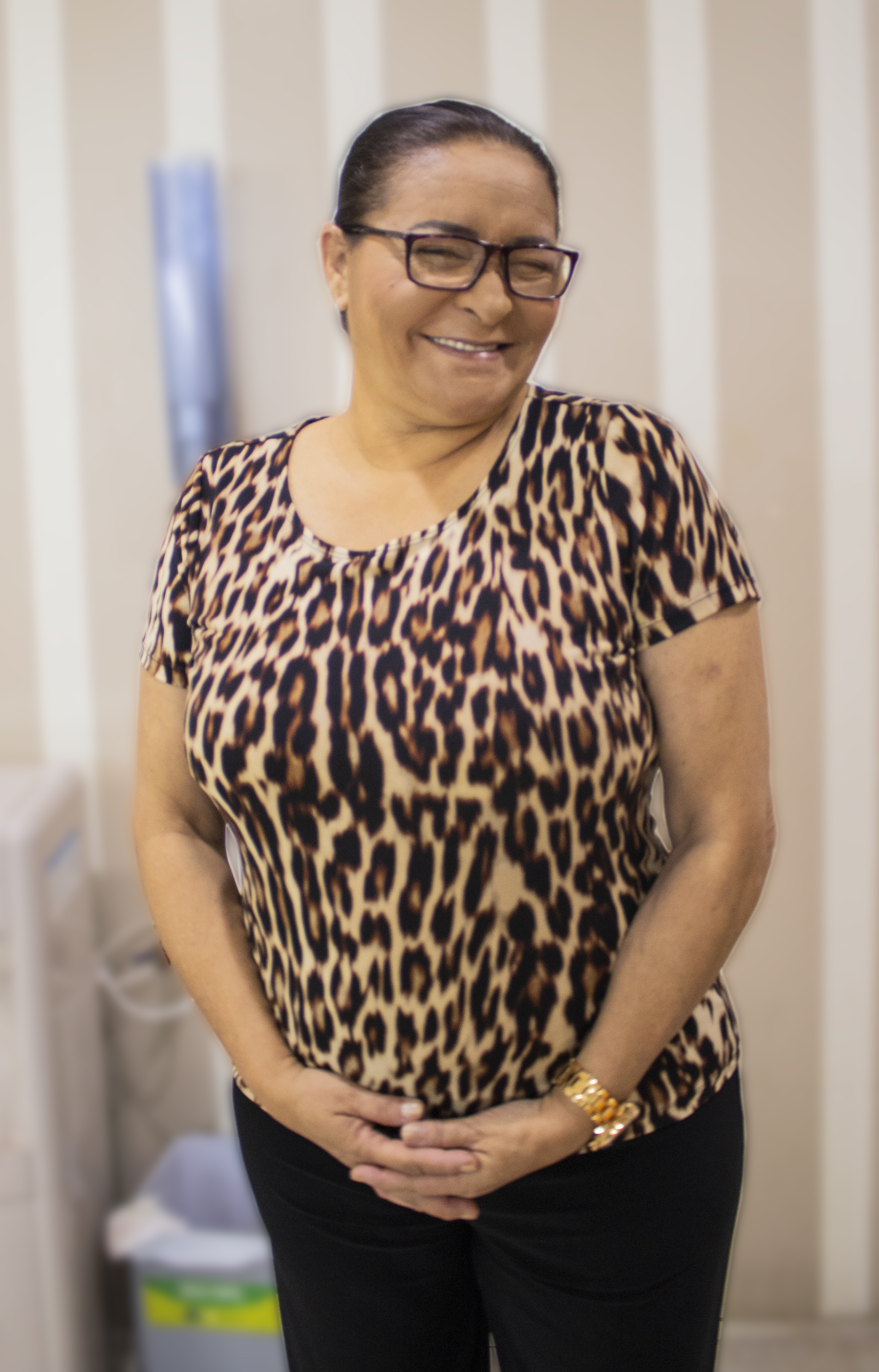
- Guillén in 2019
- Born: Amparo Piedad Coello Manzanares; 1953; Guayaquil, Ecuador
- Died: 12 December 2024 (aged 71); Cali, Colombia
- Occupation: Actress
- Children: At least 1

Amparo Piedad Coello Manzanares (1953 – 12 December 2024), better known as Amparo Guillén, was an Ecuadorian actress. Her best-known role was as Lupita, the mother of the Vera household in the Ecuadorian sitcom Mis adorables entenados.

== Biography ==
Amparo Piedad Coello Manzanares was born in Guayaquil in 1953. She took an interest in singing and acting from a young age, and at 23, began her career in the field by joining a theater group. She debuted as a television actress in the Ecuavisa telenovela Por amor propio.

=== Mis adorables entenados ===
As a member of the theater group La Mueca, Guillén met and befriended the actors Oswaldo Segura, Sandra Pareja, Héctor Garzón, Andrés Garzón, and Richard Barker. Together, they performed in the stage productions Maestra Vida and Mis adorables entenados in 1988. The next year, Ecuavisa brought the production to television and Guillén played the mother of the eponymous Vera family, who struggled to raise her step-children. Guillén participated in the series entire run, 1989 to 1991. In 2016, she had reunions with the rest of the cast in Ecuador and the United States.

=== Personal life and death ===
Amparo Guillén was sexually assaulted at ages six and fourteen, causing her to fall into substance abuse for the next 21 years of her life. Guillén kept her addiction secret, but reached a crisis when she sent her daughter, then nine years old, to study in the United States. She was married to Rodrigo Guillén. After their divorce, she kept his last name. She sought help, and at age 41, defeated her addiction and spoke publicly to young people about the dangers of substance abuse.

Guillén died from complications of diabetes and long COVID in Cali, on 12 December 2024 at the age of 71.
