= Alejandra Paredes =

Ecuadorian actress (born 1983)

- Born: María Alejandra Paredes Orejuela; January 6, 1983 (age 42); Guayaquil, Ecuador
- Occupation: Actress
- Mother: Lorgia Orejuela

María Alejandra Paredes Orejuela (born January 6, 1983) is an Ecuadorian actress. She is best known for her character Penélope de la Cruz on the TV series La pareja feliz.

== Biography ==
Alejandra Paredes was born in Guayaquil on January 6, 1983, the daughter of Lorgia Orejuela, a prominent Ecuadorian swimmer. At age 17, she was a model for Denisse Klein's agency. She began her television career on the Ecuavisa series De la vida real. Her most recognized role is that of Penelope de la Cruz on the black comedy series La pareja feliz, where she appeared alongside David Reinoso and Flor María Palomeque. She also had roles in Mostro de Amor, La Tremebunda Corte, and El hombre de la casa. She has served as the public relations officer for the Paradox School of Image and Sound.

In theater, she directed the micro-drama La balada de John y Yoko, and the children's productions Los grillos sordos and Chiquititas.

In 2019, Paredes appeared on the second season of the biographical telenovela Sharon la Hechicera. From 2019 to 2020, she was on the fifth and sixth seasons of the series 3 familias.

In 2020, she made her film debut as part of the cast of the historical drama Camino a la libertad, along with Emmanuel Palomares, Efraín Ruales, Verónica Pinzón, and Juan Carlos Román. The same year, she replaced Carolina Jaume on the TC Televisión series Antuca me enamora.

== Roles ==
=== TV series and telenovelas ===
Year(s)	Title	Character
2003	De la vida real	Various
2007	El hombre de la casa	Naty
2009–2014	La pareja feliz	Penélope de la Cruz "Penélope Cruzeta"
2010	Mostro de Amor	Cuky Guzmán
2011	La Tremebunda Corte	María Concepción de la Jaba y el Trapiche "La Conchito"
2013	Secretos	Cast
2019	Sharon 2: El desenlace	Ab. Ana María Vera
2019–2020	3 familias	Lourdes "Lili" Smith
2020	Antuca me enamora	Sixta Antonia "Sisi" Mena Mora

=== Theater ===
==== Actress ====
- La pareja feliz ... Penélope Cruzeta
- El amante
- Cat on a Hot Tin Roof
- Hollywood somos nosotras
- Radio Maja...dera ... Penélope Cruzeta
- A 2.50 la cuba libre

==== Director ====
- La balada de John y Yoko
- Los grillos sordos
- Chiquititas

=== Film ===
- Camino a la libertad ... Ana Garaycoa de Villamil
