= Giovanni Dupleint =

Ecuadorian TV personality (born 1970)

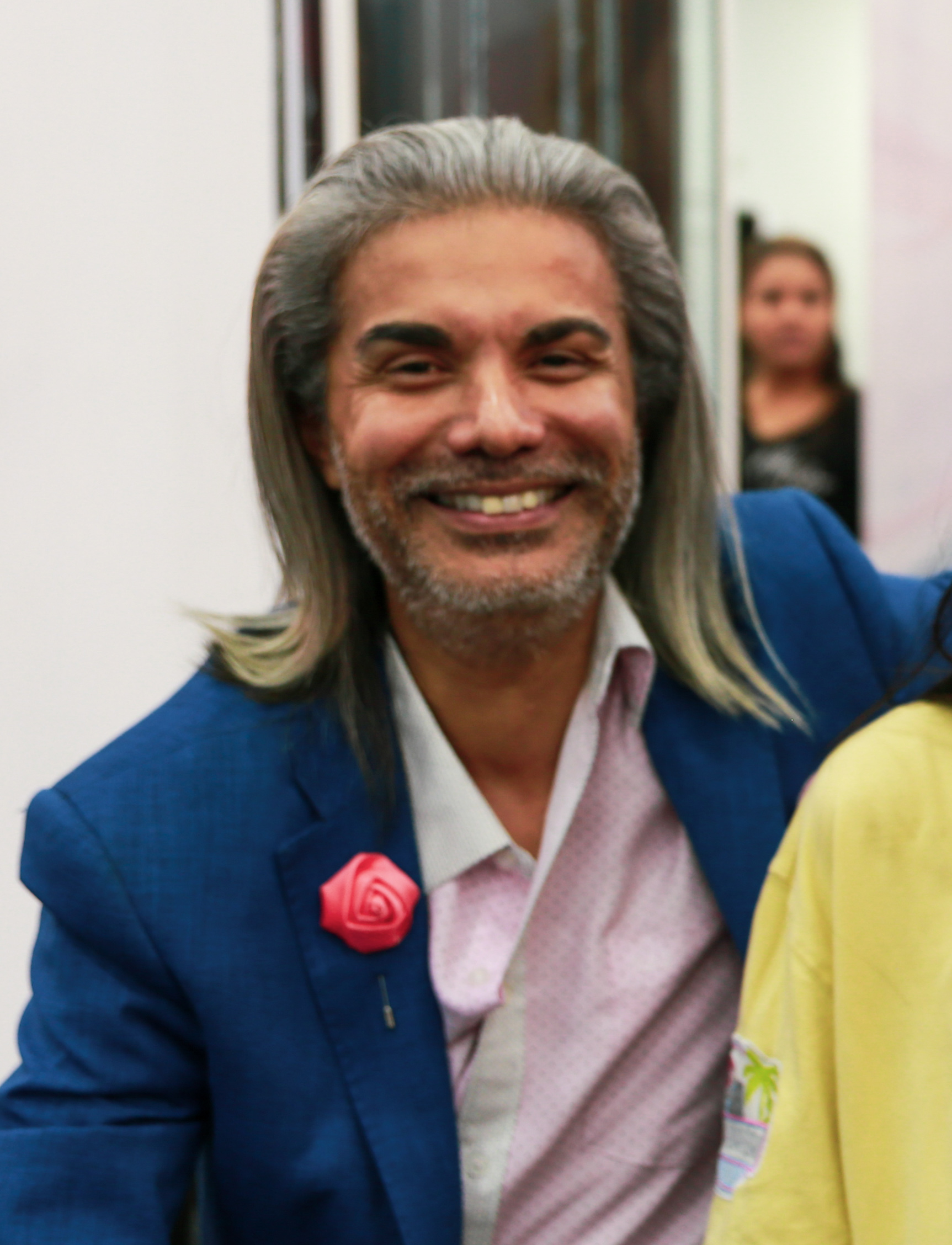
- Dupleint in 2019
- Born: 7 August 1970 (age 56); Guayaquil, Ecuador
- Occupations: TV presenter; human rights activist

Giovanni Jaramillo Lino (born 7 August 1970), better known as Giovanni Dupleint, is an Ecuadorian television presenter and human rights activist.

== Biography ==
Dupleint was born in Guayaquil, He started in the public life from a young age as a model and in 1999 ventured into radio. He reached fame on national television with his participation for more than four years as a panelist for the program Buenos muchachos, an adaptation of the Argentine program Televisión registrada.

Subsequently participating as a panelist or director in television programs like Vamos con todo, in which he remained from 2007 to 2012, Faranduleros and Intrusos. He also worked in the newspapers Hoy and El Telégrafo. In 2009 he was named "revealed character" for the LGBT foundation Famivida, given that Dupleint is openly bisexual.

He dabbled in politics in 2012 after announcing that he would launch his candidacy for the National Assembly for the Patriotic Society Party, of ex-president Lucio Gutiérrez, in order to be a candidate for vice president in the future. However, months later he announced that he had given up the candidacy and accused ex-president Gutiérrez of having asked for economic resources in order to be allowed to campaign.

During his time as a presenter on Vamos con todo, Dupleint was considered one of the more controversial figures on Ecuadoran television for his conflicts with other figures of local show business. In 2010 he caused controversy after issuing affirmations that were considered racist during the live program, saying: "!The Afro-Ecuadorians either serve to sell cocadas or serve as footballers".
