= Soy el mejor =

- Starring: Gabriela Pazmiño; Fernanda Gallardo
- Country of origin: Ecuador

Production
- Running time: 120 minutes 120 minutes (telecast)

Original release
- Network: TC Televisión
- Release: January 21, 2014

Soy el mejor (English: "I am the best") is an Ecuadorian reality show produced and broadcast by TC Television. It is hosted by Gabriela Pazmiño. The program is also transmitted by Internet, the leader of the DUAL was Lissette Cedeño and is currently Fernanda Gallardo. On Tuesday, January 21, 2014 was premiered the first season, on Monday June 30 the second, and on Monday, April 6, 2015 the VIP season. In this show, the contestants demonstrate their talents in singing, dancing and acting. Also they are graded and evaluated by a strict judges.

== Production ==
=== Casting ===
The casting process to select the sixteen participants began at Mall del Sol in Milagro, Ecuador, and was later extended to additional cities. For the VIP season, the contestants—primarily public figures—were announced during weekday broadcasts in the two weeks leading up to the program’s premiere. During these appearances, participants signed their contracts live on air before being formally introduced as part of the competition.

== Format ==
The program is structured around a series of challenges that test participants’ abilities in singing, dancing, and acting. Contestants are divided into four teams, each identified by a name and color, and compete throughout the week to prevent one of their nominated members from entering the “danger zone,” where elimination from the competition becomes possible. During the VIP season, the format differs by featuring only the two most popular teams. This version places greater emphasis on the judges’ evaluations, particularly regarding participants’ dance performance and overall talent.

== Team ==
=== Judges ===
The judge is composed of characters internationally, the same that will have to assess the presentations of each of the members of the program which will nominate and elect the removal step called Danger Zone .

==== Current ====
- Panama Drako – Dancer
- Ecuador Russia Juancho Lopez – Dancer
- Ecuador Yessenea Mendoza – Dancer

==== Previous ====
- Ecuador Vito Muñoz – Sports journalist
- Spain Danni Ubeda – Professional Singer
- Colombia José Urrutia – TV host, actor and model
- Venezuela Manuel Larrad – Singer
- Ecuador Luis Tipán – Designer
- Ecuador Mariela Viteri – TV host
- Ecuador Sofia Caiche – Model and TV host
- Ecuador AU-D – Rap Singer
- Russia Julia Mamonova – Model and dancer
- Argentina Noelia Pompa – Dancer

=== Guests ===
- Ecuador Jorge Luis del Hierro – Singer, songwriter and actor
- Ecuado} José Miguel Salem – Choreographer and dancer
- Ecuador Danilo Parra – Singer
- Urugua} Nestor Balbuena – Choreographer, entertainer and singer
- Ecuador Karen Gomez – Dancer

=== Teachers ===
- Peru Diego Tosso – Dancer and choreographer
- Ecuador Andrés Garzón – Actor
- Ecuador Yanina Murga – Singer
- Ecuador Jimmy Mendoza – Dancer and choreographer

== Crews ==
In the initial stage of the competition, it has the form of competing in Cuadrillas, at its first and second season there were 4 crews which were: Black And White, Fuego, Kilates and Neones. At that crews must beat participants from Monday to Friday to not have one of its members to Danger Zone or Gala Night. Later in the season VIP which has a different format to the other one there were two crews which as in previous seasons had to face Monday through Friday, these crews are Fuego and Kilates.

Then in the box the Achievements for each crews in 3 seasons:

Cuadrilla (Crew)	Seasons	Achievements
Black & White (Black And White)	1; 2	Winner First Season; 3º Spot Second Season
Fuego (Fire)	1; 2 VIP	2º Spot First Season; Semi-finalist First Season
Kilates (Karat)	1; 2 VIP	2º Spot Second Season; Semi-finalist Second Season
Neones (Neons)	1; 2	Winner Second Season; 3º Spot First Season; Semi-finalist Second Season
Los VIP (The VIP's)	4	
Los Bakanes (The Pleasants)	4	

== Seasons ==
Edition	Year	Host	Judge					Winner	2º Spot	3° Spot	Nº of contestants
1	2014	Gabriela Pazmiño; Danni Úbeda; Carlos José Matamoros (Withdrawn)	Sofía Caiche	José Urrutia	Manuel Larrad	Vito Muñoz	Danni Úbeda	Juan Carlos "JC" Palma	Annien Méndez	Arturo "Rayo" Vizcarra	19
2	2014	Gabriela Pazmiño; Danni Úbeda (Withdrawn)	Sofía Caiche / Mariela Viteri	AU-D	Julia Mamonova	Luis Tipán	–	Arturo "Rayo" Vizcarra	Ketzia Espinoza	Samantha Grey	18
3 (VIP)	2015	Gabriela Pazmiño	Juancho Lopez	Nestor Balbuena	Drako	Yessenea Mendoza	Noelia Pompa	Arturo "Rayo" Vizcarra	Samantha Grey	Jasú Montero	21
4	2015	Gabriela Pazmiño	Juancho Lopez	Nestor Balbuena	Carla Sala	Francisco Pinoargotti	–				25

Judge who retires during the season.

== Awards and nominations ==
Year	Awards	Category	Nominated	Result
2014	Premios ITV 2014	Best Reality Host	Gabriela Pazmiño	Winner
