= Jonathan Paredes =

Jonathan Paredes may refer to:

- Jonathan Paredes (cyclist) (1989–2025), Colombian cyclist
- Jonathan Paredes (diver) (born 1989), Mexican diver
