= Paredes de Sigüenza =

- Municipality
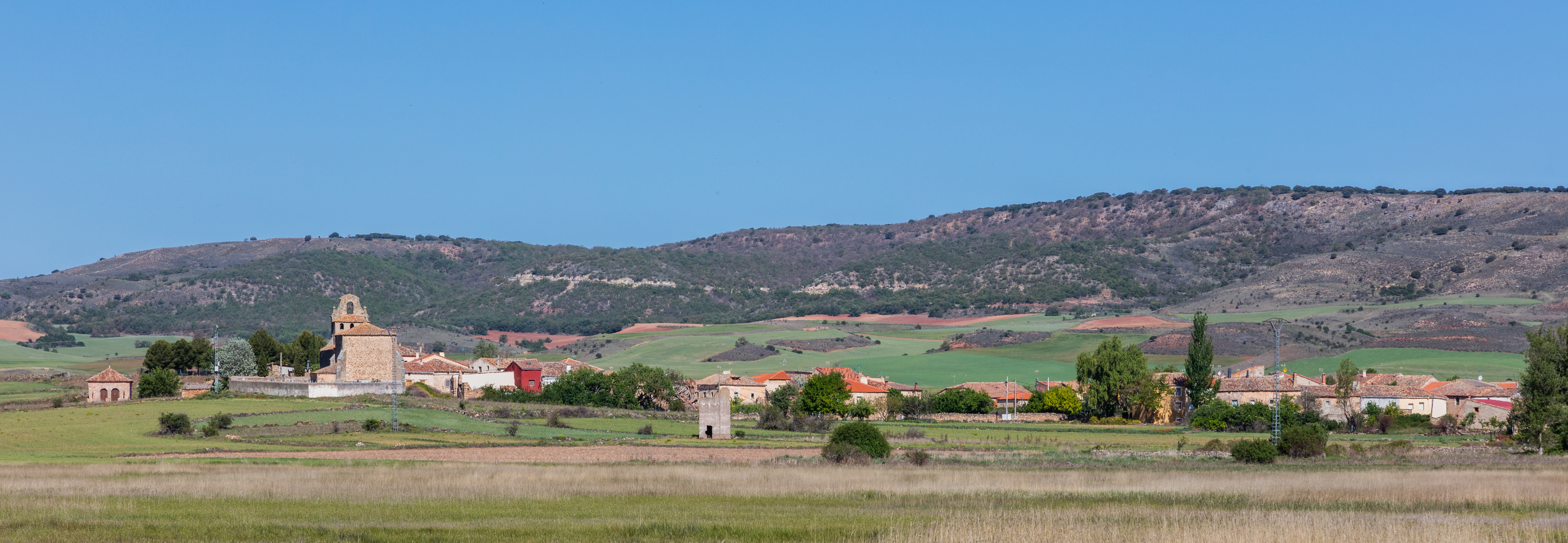

- Location in Spain
- Coordinates: 41°14′36″N 2°44′01″W
- Country: Spain
- Autonomous community: Castile-La Mancha
- Province: Guadalajara
- Comarca: Sierra norte de Guadalajara

Government
  - Alcalde: Ricardo Vázquez Puerta

Area
  - Total: 32.95 km^{2} (12.72 sq mi)
- Elevation: 1,003 m (3,291 ft)

Population (2025-01-01)
  - Total: 21
  - Density: 0.64/km^{2} (1.7/sq mi)
- Time zone: UTC+1 (CET)
  - Summer (DST): UTC+2 (CEST)
- Postal code: 19277

Paredes de Sigüenza is a municipality in the province of Guadalajara, Castile-La Mancha, Spain. The municipality has 32.95 km^{2} and had a population of 28 inhabitants, according to the 2013 census (INE).
