= Canal Uno (Ecuador) =

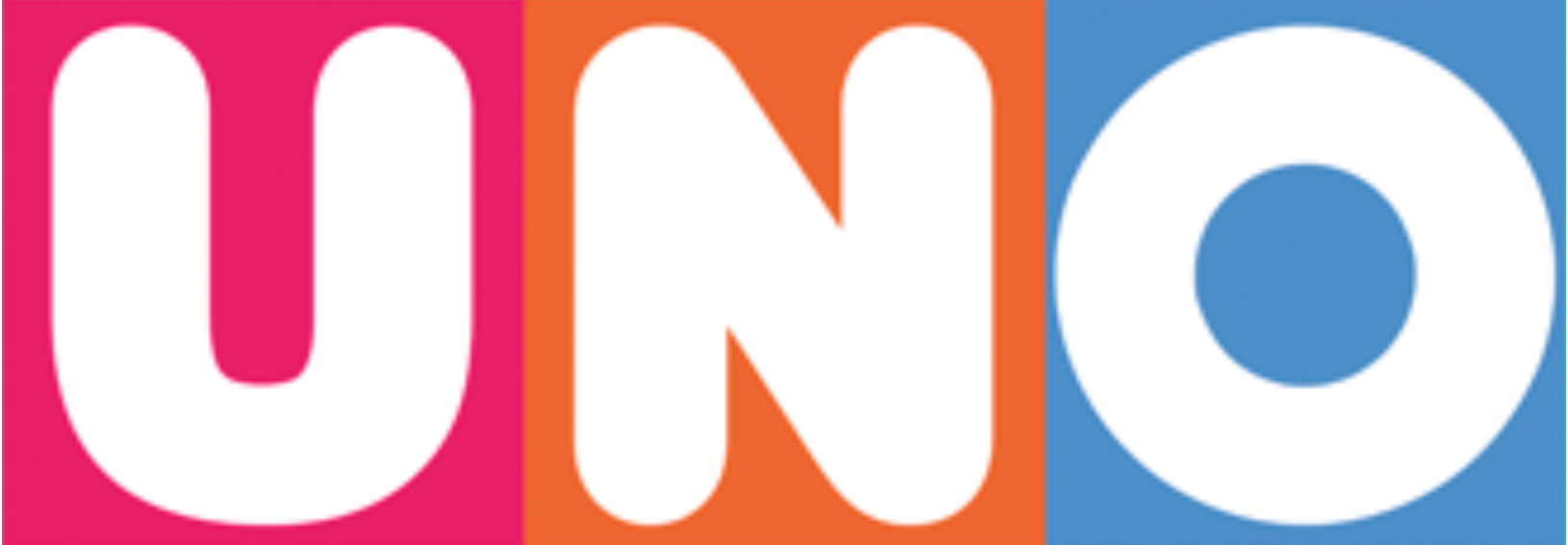
- Country: Ecuador
- Headquarters: Guayaquil, Ecuador; Quito, Ecuador

Programming
- Language(s): Spanish
- Picture format: 1080i HDTV

Ownership
- Owner: Grupo Rivas

History
- Launched: November 6, 1992
- Replaced: SíTV
- Closed: October 6, 2021
- Former names: CRE Television (1992–94); SíTV (1994–2002); Canal Uno (2002–2021)

Links
- Website: Canal Uno

Availability

Terrestrial
- Digital VHF: 12.1 (Guayaquil)

Canal Uno (formerly SiTV) was an Ecuadorian television network owned by the Group Rivas operated RELAD S.A., in the city of Guayaquil and Canal Uno S.A., in the city of Quito. Since its start in broadcasting on November 6, 1992, as CRE Televisión, April 18, 1994, as SíTV and May 6, 2002, the channel has become one of the largest chains of Ecuador.

It is on Channel 12 for the provinces of Guayaquil to the coast, the mountains, East, Southern Zone and Galapagos, Esmeraldas, Santo Domingo de los Tsáchilas, Los Rios, Manabi, Santa Elena, Guayas, El Oro, Carchi, Imbabura, Cotopaxi, Tungurahua, Chimborazo, Bolivar, Canar, Azuay, Loja, Sucumbios, Napo, Orellana, Pastaza, Morona Santiago and Zamora Chinchipe Galapagos. and Channel 12 for Quito Pichincha province. It uses the slogan "You see". Internationally signal is presented with "Canal Uno Internacional" through the website www.canal1tv.com (in May 2012, was relaunched with a new design, integrating online video and other services). In September 2012, will launch a special edition of the history of SíTV from April 18, 1994, to May 6, 2002.

Currently, a member of the Asociación de Canales de Televisión del Ecuador.

== History ==
=== CRE Televisión ===
The channel began its operations under the name of CRE Televisión (the initials of Compañía Radiodifusora del Ecuador) through cable television companies in Guayaquil, and broadcasting on Channel 12 in the VHF band. The station was owned by CRE Radio, a radio station that had launched in 1940. In its beginnings, it aired music videos, news from the radio booth, and programs imported from neighboring Colombia.

In December 1993, due to financial readjustments, businessman Rafael Guerrero Valenzuela sold the channel's shares to a group of businessmen led by Fernando Aspiazu, Isidro Romero and Galo Roggiero with the aim of entering Ecuadorian television.

=== SíTV ===
For this reason, on January 1, 1994, Sistema Integral de Televisión (SíTV) was created, created among the shareholders with the aim of seeking an alternative to commercial television in the country that was strongly dominated by the cities with the largest population. A greater investment was made and the projection of the new channel was also adjusted to the new schedule featuring Japanese anime, local productions and an updated news operation. On April 18, 1994, SíTV's broadcasts officially began, through Channel 12 VHF terrestrially from Guayaquil, from which it expanded to the national level through satellite, being one of the pioneers. In its beginnings, it had a lineup of 18 hours of local production, news services and anime series that achieved good ratings.

However, as a result of the economic crisis at the end of the 1990s and the devaluation of the official currency, the company began to fall apart due to personal and administrative disputes, therefore the channel began to completely reduce its audience. One of the biggest triggers was the arrival of businessman Marciel Rivas Sáenz, who after years as general director of Gamavisión, took ownership of the channel through the companies Banco del Progreso, Diario El Telégrafo, ElectroEcuador and Empresa Eléctrica del Ecuador (EMELEC) (Guayaquil), conforming to the company Canal 12 TV Limitada, a company that had been registered before. The channel began to cancel its own programs, the reduction of employees and the programming was leased to the Ecuadorian Episcopal Conference, under the name of Canal de Vida, for 22 hours, while the rest of the programming was only the SíTV news and an additional movie. The channel received bank loans through Banco del Progreso in order to pay off financial debts, including those of the channel's employees. During that time, the shareholders received money granted to mortgages, as well as the massive expense of the channel due to the lack of advertising and the sale of several lands that were going to be built as the new production centers of the channel.

In 2001, SíTV sold all the assets and they were transferred to the TV 12 Limitada consortium, led by a group of companies led by Rivas, with the aim of cleaning up the financial debts, as well as the renewal of the license that was about to expire. With the acquisition of the channel, SiTV continued to improve its audience, canceling the lease and began broadcasting programming from RCN Televisión from Colombia and América Televisión from Peru in a trial period, although the news programs only had one edition per week.

After financial readjustments and the cancellation of passive payments from creditors, the channel wat set to be relaunched as Canal Uno.

=== Canal Uno ===
The channel was officially relaunched on May 6, 2002, as Canal Uno Televisión (referring to the first television channel transmitted from Guayaquil to the entire country via satellite). In its beginnings it had its own in-house programming, replaced the Japanese anime for other foreign productions and taking the control of the distribution of América Televisión's programming. Canal Uno focused on news programming, its own low-budget productions, and offered movies from the Disney catalog.

In 2008, after the government confiscated the assets of Grupo Isaías after the bankruptcy of Banco Filanbanco, Rivas divested Gamavisión's shares, focusing solely on Canal Uno, after several employees and presenters moved to that channel.

== Canal Uno Internacional ==
"Canal Uno Internacional" was removed by DishLatino US in October 2008 and replaced it with Teleamazonas Internacional on channel 839.
Available in Chile as Claro TV and Satellite SatMex 5.
