= TC Televisión =

Ecuadorian free-to-air television network

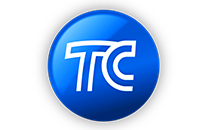
- Type: Free-to-air television network
- Country: Ecuador
- Broadcast area: Ecuador; TC Internacional: United States, Spain and Latin America
- Headquarters: Guayaquil

Programming
- Language: Spanish
- Picture format: 1080i HDTV (downscaled to 480i for the SD feed)

Ownership
- Owner: CAEC Televisión; Comunica EP
- Sister channels: Gamavisión, Ecuador TV, TV Legislativa, Educa

History
- Launched: 30 May 1969; 57 years ago
- Former names: Canal 10 (1969-1979); Telecentro (1979-1993)

Links
- Website: https://www.tctelevision.com/

Availability

Terrestrial
- Analog VHF: Channel 10 (Quito)
- Digital VHF: Channel 10.1 (HD); Channel 10.2 (SD)

TC Televisión is a state-run television channel in Ecuador. The network was founded in 1969 and was commercially-funded for many years until 2011 when Grupo Iasaías went into a lawsuit and was sold to a state government unit. Since then, the channel has been owned by SERTVSA (Sistema Ecuatoriano de Radio y Televisión) despite a local court ruling that the Isaías brothers return all of their assets from the government.

== History ==
In early 1969, RCA had completed equipment shipments worth US$600,000 to Cadena Ecuatoriana de Televisión (CETV) in Guayaquil. The transmitter was atop a mountain peak and relayed its signal over seven further transmitters across the country. CETV was primarily commercial, but had an agreement with the government to produce educational programming. On July 9, 1969, CETV was formally created, its founder being Ismael Pérez Perazo. Shortly afterwards, the station was acquired by La Filantrópica (later Filanbanco).

The organization was divided between two locations, the Azul and El Carmen mountains of Guayaquil, in charge of operations, and the city's center, where the administrative functions were located. The station's relay in Riobamba opened on December 27, 1969, becoming the first television station available there.

== Incidents ==
On January 9, 2024, at just after 2:00 p.m. local time, a group of criminals armed with weapons and explosives took over the channel's newsroom, taking the news program's presenters as hostages while threatening them during a live broadcast, although police later stated that all of the staff were freed and that they had made 13 arrests relating to the incident. The events may have been a response to the escape of José Adolfo Macías Villamar, leader of Los Choneros, an Ecuadorian drug cartel, although it is uncertain whether this is true.
