= Television in Guatemala =

Television arrived to Guatemala in 1955. Four VHF television stations are owned by the Albavisión conglomerate, which nominally represents a sort of television monopoly.

== History ==
The first television broadcast was conducted on September 18, 1955, by Canal 8, to an audience of forty television sets in central Guatemala City. Canal 3 followed in 1956. It was hit by a fire on September 29, 1961; the following day, Canal 8 shut down.

Competition was reinstated on December 15, 1964, with the launch of Televicentro Canal 7, funded by newspaper El Imparcial. The station fell into a crisis among shareholders in October 1965. This was followed by Canal 11, on October 26, 1966. The station originally intended to start transmissions around 1960–1961, but was suspended in February 1962 due to technical problems. With its launch, Guatemala now had three television stations.

Two further stations appeared in the late 1970s: Teletrece on August 23, 1978, followed by Canal 5 TV-CE on August 1, 1979, at 6pm, the latter being a public channel. UHF broadcasting started in May 1984, the first of which being Canal 21, an evangelical channel, followed by Canal 27 in 1990, also known as "el canal de Chiquitimilla". It was sold to the Protestant Familia de Dios church in 2000.

In 1975, Remigio Ángel González founded Prolasa, a content distribution company which catered the Central American market. Five years later, his new wife Alba Elvira Lorenzana acquires Televisiete, while establishing a relationship with Canal 3. In the 90s, Teleonce and Trecevisión fell under its sphere of influence.

== Digital television ==
The government of Guatemala approved the ISDB-T format to employ the digital terrestrial platform in 2013. The initial goal was to switch off analog TV within 4-5 year window. That same year, Guatevisión manager Jaime Eduardo Torres was initiating a conversion plan to digital, impacting its productions.

In November 2017, the government of Japan donated digital terrestrial equipment to the Telecommunications Superintendency.

The Congress of the Republic of Guatemala started broadcasting its digital service on channel 9.1, thanks to a US$200,000 donation from the government of Taiwan.
