= Cadena de las Américas (television program) =

Cadena de las Américas (lit. 'Network of the Americas') is a television programming block produced by Televisa in 1992, in collaboration with other Spanish-speaking broadcasters in the Americas and in Spain, in commemoration of the 500th anniversary of the Discovery of the Americas. It lasted a total of 176 days, from 20 April to 12 October 1992; nineteen Spanish-speaking countries took part.

The Cadena consisted of a four-hour, satellite-fed block which was sent to the member stations of the project. Programs usually lasted for one hour, whose title was the name of the country to which it was dedicated. Each country-specific program showed facets of its culture, religion, customs and traditions, key historic figures, key spots, ethnic groups, geography, economy, the problems the country was facing, etc. The block was delivered using PanAmSat.

In addition to that, several special programs such as the children's telenovela Carrusel de las Américas were also broadcast, airing on the member broadcasters at the end of the daily block and on Televisa's main channel (El Canal de las Estrellas) in a separate timeslot, the one usually reserved for children's telenovelas.

== Participating countries ==
In alphabetical order:

Country	Channel or network
Argentina	ATC and Canal 9 Libertad
Bolivia	ATB
Chile	Megavisión and RTU
Colombia	Cadena 3
Costa Rica	Sinart
Ecuador	Gamavisión
El Salvador	TCS (channels 2, 4 and 6)
Spain	TVE (La 2 and TVE Internacional)
United States	Univisión and Telemundo
Guatemala	RTG (channels 3 y 7)
Honduras	TVC (Telesistema Hondureño, Canal 5 and Telecadena 7/4)
Mexico	Televisa (El Canal de las Estrellas and Canal 4)
Nicaragua	Televicentro
Panama	RPC Televisión
Paraguay	SNT and RPC
Peru	América TV, ATV y Frecuencia Latina
Puerto Rico	Telemundo
Dominican Republic	RTVD
Uruguay	Monte Carlo TV
Venezuela	Venevisión

Peru arrived late following instability from a self-coup, while Brazil was excluded from the project because of its language.

== Programs ==
The four-hour block had three hours of obligatory programming, however the fourth hour was optional. In Mexico, the bulk of it (three hours) aired on Canal 4 in Mexico City, while Carrusel de las Américas and the fourth hour aired on XEW's network. In Spain, it was carried on La 2; TVE also delivered the block on its international channel in its feed for the Americas. Each participating broadcaster was expected to send 20 to 35 hours of programming in total; TVE, however, opted to use its contributions to carry programs on Expo '92 (held in Seville during the entire run of Cadena) and the 1992 Summer Olympics (held in Barcelona).

While the United States were not a participating country, it was carried on the Galavisión cable network there.

In July 1992, the Millennium ensemble from Guatemala began its activities by appearing on the network.

In addition to country-specific programs from the member countries, there were also other programs:

- Carrusel de las Américas: commemmorative telenovela for the 500th anniversary of the Spanish arrival to the American continent. Unlike the original Carrusel from 1989 which tackled class differences, the series emphasized on differences between countries; each child of the telenovela represented each country's way of thinking. Its main actors were Gabriela Rivero, Irán Eory, Ricardo Blume and Marisol Santacruz.
- Iberoamérica Hoy: half-hour program presented by Julieta Rosen and Gonzalo Vega, showing brief reports from the participating countries. The program usually ended with a typical fable from an American country.
- El Sida: enfermedad del siglo XXI: reports and special investigations on AIDS and its repercussions on Latin American society.
- Y Vero América Va: Music show presented by Verónica Castro. The main characteristic was, in addition of presenting top artists from the participating country, it also entered the daily life of its inhabitants, with the goal of knowing the traditions unique to each country or region.
- Toros: bullfighting was broadcast on 19 July, showing highlights from Quito, Tlaxcala, Lima and Cali.
- Encuentro para Gente Grande: Program where events and culture of the Ibero-American region were shown.

== Topics ==
The programs tackled the collowing topics:

- Demographics
- Society
- Geography
- Religion
- Flora and fauna
- Customs and traditions
- Music
- Sports

== Aftermath ==
The program did not have a huge impact upon its ending in the United States; in the early 90s, Spanish-language television was heavily commercialized and less cultural.
