= 1990–91 Guatemalan general election =

- Presidential election
- 11 November 1990 (first round); 6 January 1991 (second round)
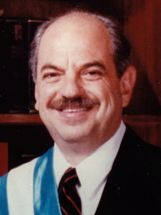

Nominee	Jorge Serrano	Jorge Carpio
Party	MAS	National Centre Union
Running mate	Gustavo Espina	Manuel Ayau
Popular vote	936,389	438,990
Percentage	68.08%	31.92%
President before election
Vinicio Cerezo
DCG
President-elect
Jorge Serrano Elías
MAS

General elections were held in Guatemala on 11 November 1990. with a second round of the presidential election held on 6 January 1991. The presidential election resulted in a victory for Jorge Serrano Elías of the Solidarity Action Movement, whilst the National Centre Union won the Congressional elections. Voter turnout was 56.4% in the elections on 11 November 1990 and 45.2% in the elections on 6 January 1991.

== Results ==
=== President ===
Candidate	Running mate	Party	First round		Second round	
Candidate	Running mate	Party	Votes	%	Votes	%
Jorge Carpio Nicolle	Manuel Francisco Ayau Cordón	National Centre Union	399,777	25.72	438,990	31.92
Jorge Serrano Elías	Gustavo Espina	Solidarity Action Movement	375,165	24.14	936,389	68.08
Luis Alfonso Cabrera Hidalgo	Marco Antonio Villamar Contreras	Guatemalan Christian Democracy	271,933	17.50		
Álvaro Arzú	Fraterno Vila Betoret	National Advancement Party	268,796	17.29		
Luis Ernesto Sosa Ávila	Luis David Arturo Eskenasy Cruz	MLN–FAN	74,825	4.81		
René Armando de León Schlotter	Aracely Mercedes Conde Aguilar de Paiz	PSD–AP5	55,819	3.59		
José Ángel Lee Duarte	Carlos Francisco Gallardo Flores	Revolutionary Party	33,429	2.15		
José Ramón Fernández González	José Adolfo Putzeys Pacheco	Democratic Party of National Cooperation	32,325	2.08		
Manuel Benedicto Lucas García	Héctor Antonio Guerra Pedroza	Emerging Movement of Harmony	16,894	1.09		
Fernando Antonio Leal Estévez	Kurt Martín Meyer Rodas	National Renewal Party	11,052	0.71		
Leonel Hernández Cardona	Raúl Horacio Montenegro Castellanos	United Front of the Revolution	7,957	0.51		
Jorge Antonio Reyna Castillo	Carlos Antonio Torres Herrera	Democratic Party	6,341	0.41		
Total			1,554,313	100.00	1,375,379	100.00
Valid votes			1,554,313	85.93	1,375,379	94.89
Invalid/blank votes			254,488	14.07	74,110	5.11
Total votes			1,808,801	100.00	1,449,489	100.00
Registered voters/turnout			3,204,955	56.44	3,204,955	45.23
Source: Nohlen, Rosón

=== Congress ===
Party	National			District			Total seats
Party	Votes	%	Seats	Votes	%	Seats	Total seats
National Centre Union	399,679	25.72	8	357,528	22.28	33	41
Solidarity Action Movement	375,119	24.14	8	225,031	14.02	10	18
Guatemalan Christian Democracy	271,842	17.49	6	276,072	17.20	21	27
National Advancement Party	268,776	17.29	5	233,559	14.55	7	12
MLN–FAN	74,994	4.83	1	4,381	0.27	0	1
PSD–AP5	55,804	3.59	1	64,633	4.03	0	1
Revolutionary Party	33,417	2.15	0	50,547	3.15	1	1
Democratic Party of National Cooperation	32,297	2.08	0	24,750	1.54	0	0
Emerging Movement of Harmony	16,915	1.09	0	10,759	0.67	0	0
National Renewal Party	11,025	0.71	0	17,386	1.08	0	0
United Front of the Revolution	7,950	0.51	0	16,808	1.05	0	0
Democratic Party	6,413	0.41	0	13,284	0.83	0	0
FRG–PID–FUN				201,401	12.55	12	12
National Liberation Movement				83,738	5.22	3	3
PID–FUR–FRG				11,923	0.74	0	0
Organised Nationalist Union				3,422	0.21	0	0
Popular Alliance 5				2,521	0.16	0	0
Democratic Social Party				2,204	0.14	0	0
Guatemalan Republican Front				1,875	0.12	0	0
National Progress Front				1,684	0.10	0	0
Progressive Liberating Party				590	0.04	0	0
FUN–PID				447	0.03	0	0
PNR–MEC				320	0.02	0	0
Total	1,554,231	100.00	29	1,604,863	100.00	87	116
Valid votes	1,554,231	85.93		1,604,863	89.08		
Invalid/blank votes	254,487	14.07		196,733	10.92		
Total votes	1,808,718	100.00		1,801,596	100.00		

== Bibliography ==
- Villagrán Kramer, Francisco. Biografía política de Guatemala: años de guerra y años de paz. FLACSO-Guatemala, 2004.
- Political handbook of the world 1990. New York, 1991.
