= Asociación de Televisoras de Centroamérica y Panamá =

Group of television channel companies

Asociación de Televisoras de Centroamérica y Panamá (Spanish: Association of Television Companies of Central America and Panama, abbreviated ATELCAP) was a pan-regional broadcasting alliance composed of television channels from five Spanish-speaking Central American nations and Panama.

ATELCAP was founded by a group of five businessmen who each owned one television station per country, and subsequently became members by default: José Antonio Mourra (owner of Trecevisión) from Guatemala; Boris Eserski (owner of Telecorporación Salvadoreña) from El Salvador; Rafael Ferrari (owner of Canal 5) from Honduras; Octavio Sacasa (owner of Televicentro from Nicaragua; and Fernando Eleta Almaran (owner of RPC Televisión) from Panama, who together acted as presidents. Through their collaborative efforts, the owners of the channels bought imported content together and used the microwave network supplied by telecommunications company COMTELCA that was shared between the countries. Thanks to the network, the member channels provided a variety of international content to the viewers in the individual markets.

As of October 1987, the network consisted of the following members:

- Guatemala: Canal 3, Televisiete, Teleonce, Canal 13
- El Salvador: Telecorporación Salvadoreña (channels 2, 4 and 6)
- Honduras: Televicentro (channels 3, 5 and 7)
- Costa Rica: Canal 2, Telecentro, Teletica
- Panama: TVN, RPC Televisión, Panavisión/Telecinco (defunct), Telemetro

Nicaragua had been suspended at the time because the channels Sacasa owned (2 and 12 and their respective relayers 7 and 5) had been usurped by the state in 1979, forming Sistema Sandinista de Televisión. Per a session held in San José, and following the Esquipulas II agreement, ATELCAP demanded the return of the channels to their rightful owner, enabling the country to enter the network.

Both Televicentro and the state channel of Nicaragua joined ATELCAP in 1992, in order to combat piracy of international television content, stemming from the rise of satellite dishes.

On December 1, 2006, ATELCAP and ASDER held a joint forum for the then-incoming arrival of digital terrestrial television in the region, and what should be done at the long term. It was suggested that the countries would adopt the ATSC format.

It is unknown when exactly did ATELCAP shut down; up until October 2022, the ID of the association was played on the sign-on and sign-off routines of the three TCS networks, before it was removed when TCS unveiled a new national anthem video.
