= Mass media in Latin America =

Mass media in Latin America includes a range of media groups across television, radio and the press. Pan-Latin American television networks include the US-based CNN en Español, Univision, and MundoVision, as well as Spain's Canal 24 Horas. In 2005 TeleSUR, headquartered in Caracas, Venezuela, was launched with the support of regional governments, as a Venezuelan government propaganda channel.

Mexican media mogul Remigio Ángel González's Albavision encompasses 26 TV stations and 82 radio stations, and includes La Red (Chile), ATV (Peru), SNT (Paraguay) and Canal 9 (Argentina). González's is a particularly powerful force in the media of Guatemala, with a virtual monopoly of the commercial television airwaves.

Grupo Clarín, with 2009 revenues of $1.7bn, is Argentina's largest media group. Established as such in 1999, it includes the Clarín newspaper (the most-widely circulated in Latin America), the Artear media company, and numerous other media outlets.

Peruvian newspaper El Peruano, founded October 22, 1825, is the oldest daily newspaper of Latin America currently in circulation.

== See also ==
- International Press Institute
- Television in Latin America
- Telenovela
