= Mass media in Guatemala =

Mass media in Guatemala is dominated in the area of commercial television by Mexican media mogul Remigio Ángel González, who since the mid-1990s has "virtual monopoly control of that nation's commercial television airwaves". González controls four television stations in Guatemala - El Super Canal, Televisiete, Teleonce and Trecevisión.

González, who also owns a majority of the country's cinemas, had by 2000 also acquired 21 radio stations, including Radio Sonora, known as a leader in news. The other two major radio chains are Emisoras Unidas (owned by the Archila family) and Radio Grupo Alius (owned by Alfonso Liu), a chain of Christian stations which does not compete in news or music.

A 2001 study of González' media properties in Guatemala and Nicaragua found that they had a tendency to squeeze out voices opposed to the government, and concluded that "Gonzalez’s ownership practices create an atmosphere that undercuts the development of democracy." He has a strong influence in Guatemalan politics, for example giving $650,000 to Vinicio Cerezo's 1985 presidential campaign, as well as more than $2.6 million and free airtime to Alfonso Portillo's 1999 campaign. "Political analysts say the free commercials helped Portillo win the election."

After becoming president, Portillo "named Gonzalez's brother-in-law, Luis Rabbé, as his minister of communications, infrastructure and housing, a powerful Cabinet position whose jurisdiction includes the oversight of broadcast media."

== See also ==
- List of newspapers in Guatemala
- List of journalists killed in Guatemala
