= Guillermo Méndez =

Guillermo Méndez may refer to:

- Guillermo Méndez (footballer, born 1994) (born 1994), Uruguayan footballer
- Guillermo Méndez Pereiro (born 1992), Spanish footballer
- Guillermo W. Méndez (born 1955), Guatemalan theologian
