= Censorship in Guatemala =

Article 35 of the Guatemalan Constitution guarantees the right to freedom of expression, with an attached clause banning offensive or criminal speech. Censorship in Guatemala remains a problem in the country today. Guatemalan news reporters have faced government led censorship and other types of censorship, often in the form of intimidation, since the beginning of the Guatemalan Civil War. In Guatemala today, reporters often must contend with legal harassment, threats, and in the worst cases, assault or murder, originating from the government, large businesses, and the cartels. Newspapers and radio stations face the most harassment in the country, as television in Guatemala is owned almost exclusively by Angel González González, a conservative foreign businessman, whose success in the country is due to cooperation with the government. These aggressions, combined with the government's lack of response or punishment for perpetrators, have led to a culture of self-censorship for reporters in the country.

== Censorship during the Guatemalan Civil War ==
The Guatemalan Civil War, fought from 1960 to 1996, put into power a series of dictators who tried to control the media through a combination of censorship laws and violence. During the thirty-six years of violence in the country, three hundred and twenty four journalists were killed, while a hundred and twenty-six are still missing. So far, no one has been held accountable for any of these deaths or disappearances, although the Guatemalan government has been implicated in the cases of both Irma Flaquer and Jorge Carpio Nicolle. Another form of censorship used during the 1980s was defamation, when "government agents would accuse certain journalists as destabilizers of democracy, connections with cartels, or just attempt to publically [sic] humiliate them, as tactics to disqualify their integrity and morality as journalists." In 1987, the government of General Efraín Ríos Montts’ ordered the censorship of any news relating to leftist guerrillas or "commentaries related to subversive activities occurring in the country." In May 1993, President Jorge Serrano ordered the censorship of both daily newspapers and broadcast media. In protest, newspapers would run their stories with the blacked out marks made by the censors that the President had installed at their companies, although some accepted the presidents offer of self-censorship. Self-censorship was prevalent to journalists in Guatemala, due to the violence faced by those who would criticize the government. Juan Lopez, the President of Guatemalan Federation of Radio Stations in 1991, said of self-censorship regarding his programs, "of course self-censorship govern all our programs: we want to avoid provoking reprisals at all cost. There are certain subjects we can’t take on board."

== Censorship from 1996-present ==
From the end of the war to present, many of the modes of censorship in Guatemala have remained the same, though journalists and human rights activists believe that freedom of the press is stronger now then it was during the war. Censorship in the form of intimidation is still prevalent in Guatemala, where there have been 24 murdered journalists between 2000 and 2013, all unsolved. In March 2015, protests were held in Guatemala City and Mazatenago in retaliation to three journalists who were murdered in connection to a money laundering scandal one of the journalists was investigating. CERIGUA reported 117 cases of violence against journalists in November 2015, up from 74 cases the previous year, specifying, "that police and political parties were among the primary aggressors." Censorship also comes in the form of legal threats in present-day Guatemala, where the government uses legal restrictions under Article 35 to target media organizations and the journalists that work for them. Journalists often face libel and defamation cases, though politicians will uses bribery, money laundering, and trafficking to take journalists to court "with the express purpose of harassment." José Rubén Zamora, along with facing numerous physical threats throughout his career, had criminal charges filed against him by the president and vice president for his coverage of the government. The government also formed Foundation Against Media Terrorism in 2015, which "journalists interpreted as an attempt to increase control over the press." Amid complaints from human rights’ groups, the foundation was disbanded in the same year. Also in Guatemala, "there is an unspoken collective censorship on three topics: cartels, organized crime, and corporate companies. Those topics are off limits for the main reason of personal safety." This self-censorship is out of fear of retaliation by powerful groups in Guatemala. Red zones in the countryside also exist in Guatemala, areas controlled by the cartels where no one is allowed to enter unless given permission, including journalists. Mention of cartel groups by journalists often comes with threats or harassment.
