= Alba Elvira Lorenzana =

Wife of media mogul Remigio Ángel González

Alba Elvira Lorenzana Cardona
- Born: January 5, 1950 (age 75); Puerto Barrios, Guatemala
- Spouse: Remigio Ángel González

Alba Elvira Lorenzana Cardona (Puerto Barrios, January 5, 1950) is the second wife of controversial Latin American media mogul Remigio Ángel González. Her first name was used by her husband for the Albavisión conglomerate and the Cinemas Alba circuit in Guatemala. Between 2016 and 2022, she was wanted by the Guatemalan government for corruption.

== Biography ==
=== Personal life ===
Ángel González married Alba in a second marriage upon his return to Guatemala in 1980 after a car accident during his honeymoon killed his first wife, who was related to Luis Rabbé. In 2008, González named his media conglomerate Albavisión in her honor.

As of 2016, she was the legal representative of Albavisión's two main channels in Guatemala, Radio Televisión, S.A. (Canal 3) and Televisiete, S.A. (Televisiete, now Canal 7). Between 2008 and 2011, the two stations received Q 17.6 million in finances. She had owned both stations since at least the late 70s, alongside Sara Aurora Cardona.

=== Corruption cases ===
Between 2008 and 2011, she was involved in a case of political corruption where it was alleged that she had illegally funded former president Otto Pérez Molina's candidacy.

On September 8, 2016, Interpol issued an arrest order for Alba, due to her connections with a state corruption case begun that July (Cooptación del Estado). The document revealed that she traveled illegally from Italy to Miami with a stop in Nicaragua, one of the countries where Albavisión has assets. Also on the trip was Remigio's Argentine attorney Carlos Loréfice Lynch. Her case was removed from Interpol's website on July 4, 2017 for unknown reasons.

On July 28, 2022, the Second Chamber of Greater Risk of Guatemala demanded the suspension of her arrest order within a 24-hour period. She was benefitted by the Constitutional Court on November 9, annulling her warrant order.
