= Qualy TV =

Central American satellite television operator

Qualy TV logo before its closure in 2016

Qualy TV was a Central American satellite television operator owned by Albavisión. The service operated between 2013 and 2016 in Guatemala, Nicaragua and Costa Rica and used the satellite fleet of Media Networks Latin America, which Movistar used for its satellite services in South American countries.

== History ==
The operator had its commercial launch in March 2013 in Guatemala, with plans to launch the service in the coming months to more countries of the region: Costa Rica, Honduras, El Salvador, Panama, Nicaragua and the Dominican Republic. At the same time, it added Yups Channel, produced by Media Networks and carrying RGB (Cris Morena)'s back catalog. Ahead of the launch, the provider had more than 60 channels, including Albavisión's four OTA outlets. In December, it arrived to Costa Rica.

On December 31, 2013, the operator added Claxson's Hotpack, consisting of Playboy, Venus and Sextreme. In March 2014, its service launched in Nicaragua.

Facing the removal of channels, Qualy TV announced in late August 2016 that it would cease operations in Costa Rica, without even determining if the two other countries would cease the service too. The operator did not mention what were the causes, aside from technical issues beyond the company's control.
