= 1999 Guatemalan general election =

- Presidential election
- 7 November 1999 (first round); 26 December 1999 (second round)
- Turnout: 53.76% (first round) ▲6.96pp 40.37% (second round) ▼3.49pp
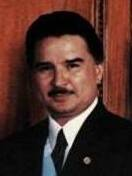

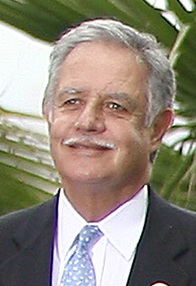
Nominee	Alfonso Portillo	Óscar Berger
Party	FRG	PAN
Running mate	Juan Francisco Reyes	Arabella Castro
Popular vote	1,184,932	549,408
Percentage	68.32%	31.68%
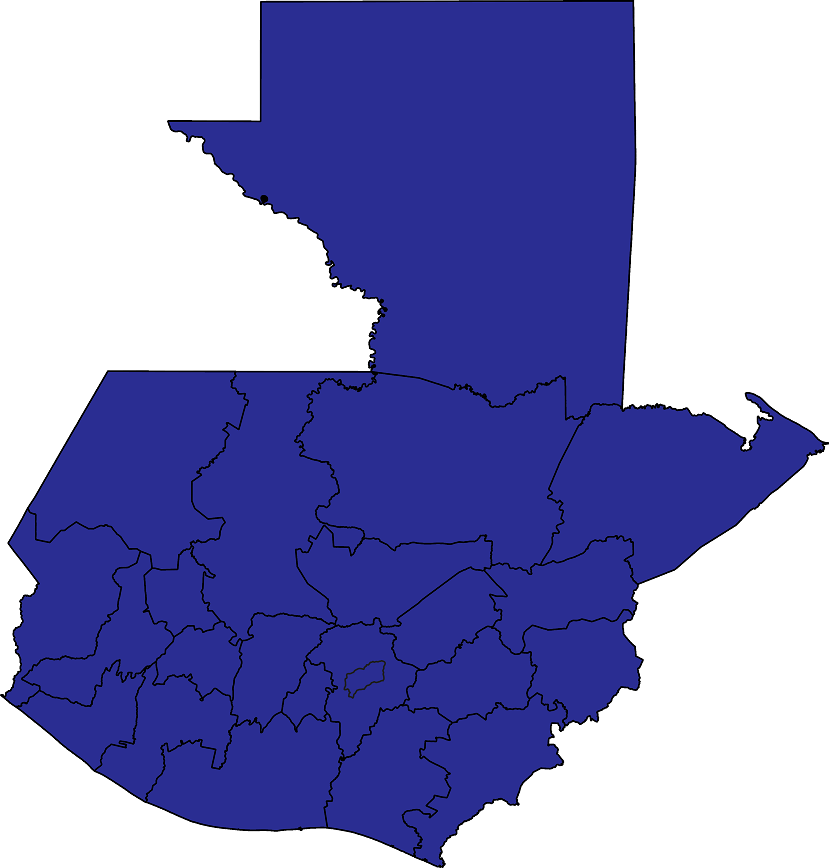
President before election
Álvaro Arzú
PAN
President-elect
Alfonso Portillo
FRG

General elections were held in Guatemala on 7 November 1999, with a second round of the presidential elections on 26 December. Alfonso Portillo won the presidential elections, whilst his Guatemalan Republican Front also won a majority of Congressional seats. Voter turnout was 53.8% on 7 November and 40.4% on 26 December.

Media owner Remigio Ángel González gave more than $2.6 million and free airtime to Alfonso Portillo's campaign, which led to some political analysts to claim that the free adverts helped Portillo win the election. After becoming president, Portillo appointed Gonzalez's brother-in-law Luis Rabbé to the post of Minister of Communications, Infrastructure and Housing, a post which included responsibility for overseeing the broadcast media. The presidential election also established a pattern for the next 16 years in which the runner-up of the previous contest then went on to win.

== Results ==
=== President ===
Candidate	Party	First round		Second round	
Candidate	Party	Votes	%	Votes	%
Alfonso Portillo	Guatemalan Republican Front	1,045,820	47.72	1,184,932	68.32
Óscar Berger	National Advancement Party	664,417	30.32	549,408	31.68
Álvaro Colom	URNG–DIA	270,891	12.36		
Acisclo Valladares Molína	Progressive Liberating Party	67,924	3.10		
Juan Francisco Bianchi Castillo	Democratic Renewal Action Party	45,470	2.07		
Ana Catalina Soberanis Reyes	Democratic Front New Guatemala	28,108	1.28		
José Enrique Asturias Rudeke	LOV–UD	25,236	1.15		
Danilo Julián Roca Barillas	National Centre Union	22,939	1.05		
Carlos Humberto Pérez Rodríguez	National Liberation Movement	13,080	0.60		
Emilio Eva Saldívar	Democratic Alliance	4,929	0.22		
Flor de María Alvarado Suárez de Solís	National Reconciling Alliance	2,698	0.12		
Total		2,191,512	100.00	1,734,340	100.00
Valid votes		2,191,512	91.42	1,734,340	96.36
Invalid/blank votes		205,700	8.58	65,588	3.64
Total votes		2,397,212	100.00	1,799,928	100.00
Registered voters/turnout		4,458,744	53.76	4,458,744	40.37
Source: Nohlen

=== Congress ===
Party	National			District			Total seats
Party	Votes	%	Seats	Votes	%	Seats	Total seats
Guatemalan Republican Front	891,429	42.09	11	879,839	41.36	52	63
National Advancement Party	570,108	26.92	7	589,550	27.71	30	37
New Nation Alliance (URNG–DIA)	233,870	11.04	2	231,970	10.90	7	9
Guatemalan Christian Democracy	86,839	4.10	1	68,609	3.23	1	2
Progressive Liberating Party	84,197	3.98	1	91,484	4.30	0	1
Democratic Renewal Action Party	63,824	3.01	0	76,994	3.62	0	0
Democratic Front New Guatemala	60,821	2.87	0	53,544	2.52	0	0
LOV–UD	48,184	2.28	0	48,398	2.28	1	1
National Centre Union	42,921	2.03	0	40,069	1.88	0	0
National Liberation Movement	22,857	1.08	0	21,656	1.02	0	0
Democratic Action	8,644	0.41	0	6,074	0.29	0	0
National Reconciliation Alliance	4,178	0.20	0	1,868	0.09	0	0
UCN–DCG				6,480	0.30	0	0
DCG–FDNG				5,792	0.27	0	0
National Union				3,222	0.15	0	0
MLN–DCG				1,829	0.09	0	0
Total	2,117,872	100.00	22	2,127,378	100.00	91	113
Valid votes	2,117,872	88.36		2,127,378	88.80		
Invalid/blank votes	279,011	11.64		268,249	11.20		
Total votes	2,396,883	100.00		2,395,627	100.00		
Registered voters/turnout	4,458,744	53.76		4,458,744	53.73		
Source: Nohlen, Lehoucq

== Bibliography ==
- Villagrán Kramer, Francisco. Biografía política de Guatemala: años de guerra y años de paz. FLACSO-Guatemala, 2004.
- Political handbook of the world 1999. New York, 2000.
