= Politics of Guatemala =

Politics of Guatemala takes place in a framework of a presidential representative democratic republic, where by the President of Guatemala is both head of state, head of government, and of a multi-party system. Executive power is exercised by the government. Legislative power is vested in both the government and the Congress of the Republic. The judiciary is independent of the executive and the legislature. Guatemala is a Constitutional Republic.

Guatemala's 1985 Constitution provides for a separation of powers among the executive, legislative, and judicial branches of government.

Historically, Guatemala was characterized by civil war and frequent coups. Modern Guatemalan politics are still strongly affected by the Guatemalan Civil War (1960–1996). From the late 1990s to the mid-2010s, Guatemalan democracy improved, as greater civilian control of the military was achieved and anti-corruption measures were adopted. Since 2017, there has been democratic backsliding in Guatemala.

== Legislative branch ==
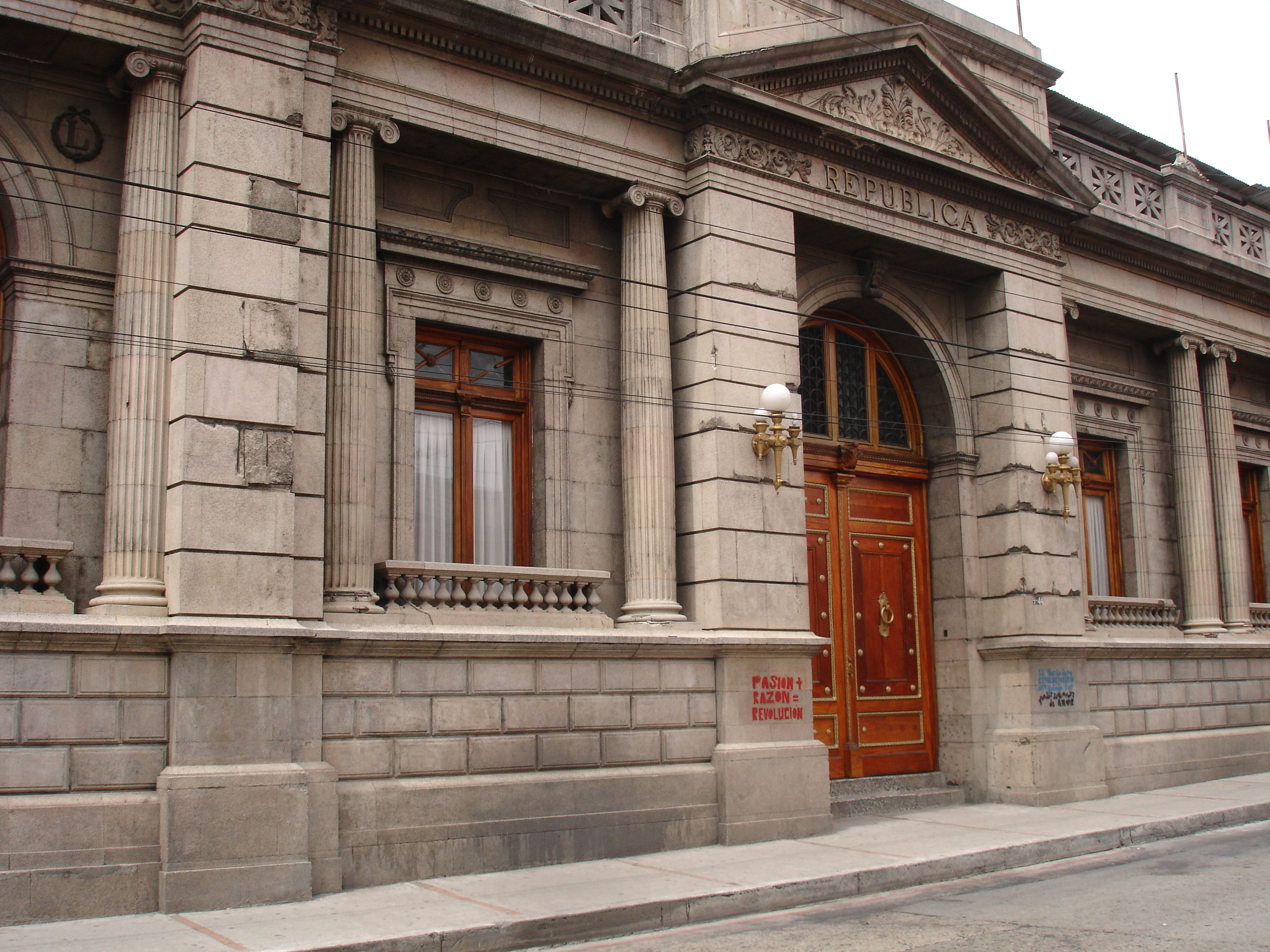
The Guatemalan Congress.

The Congress of the Republic (Congreso de la República) has 160 members, elected for a four-year term, partially in departmental constituencies and partially by nationwide proportional representation.

== Judicial branch ==
The Constitutional Court (Corte de Constitucionalidad) is Guatemala's constitutional court and only interprets the law in matters that affect the country's constitution. It is composed of five judges, elected for concurrent five-year terms each with a supplement, each serving one year as president of the Court: one is elected by Congress, one elected by the Supreme Court of Justice, one is appointed by the President, one is elected by Superior Council of the Universidad San Carlos de Guatemala, and one by the Bar Association (Colegio de Abogados);

The Supreme Court of Justice (Corte Suprema de Justicia) is Guatemala's highest court. It comprises thirteen members, who serve concurrent five-year terms and elect a president of the Court each year from among their number. The Supreme Court has an Appeal Court formed by 43 members. When one of the Supreme Court is absent or cannot participate in a case, one of the Appeal Court takes its place. The president of the Supreme Court of Justice is also president of the Judicial Branch of Guatemala (Organismo Judicial de Guatemala), and supervises both the hundreds of trial judges around the country (who are named to five-year terms) and the administrative work force which assists the magistrates.

== Administrative divisions ==
Guatemala is divided into 22 departments, administered by governors appointed by the president. Guatemala City and 333 other municipalities are governed by popularly elected mayors or councils.

== Foreign relations ==
Guatemala's major diplomatic interests are regional security and increasingly, regional development and economic integration.

== Political culture and human rights ==
The 1999 presidential and legislative elections were considered by international observers to have been free and fair. Participation by women and indigenous voters was higher than in the recent past, although concerns remained regarding the accessibility of polling places in rural areas.

Alfonso Portillo's landslide victory combined with a Guatemalan Republican Front (FRG) majority in Congress suggested possibilities for rapid legislative action. However, under the Guatemalan Constitution of 1985, passage of many kinds of legislation requires a two-thirds vote. Passage of such legislation is not possible, therefore, with FRG votes alone.

The political balance was disrupted in 2000 when allegations surfaced that the FRG had illegally altered legislation. Following an investigation, the Supreme Court stripped those involved, including President of Congress and FRG chief Ríos Montt, of their legislative immunity to face charges in the case. At roughly the same time, the PAN opposition suffered an internal split and broke into factions; the same occurred in the ANN. As a result, reforms essential to peace implementation await legislative action.

New cases of human rights abuse continued to decline, although violent harassment of human rights workers presented a serious challenge to government authority. Common crime, aggravated by a legacy of violence and vigilante justice, presents another serious challenge. Impunity remains a major problem, primarily because democratic institutions, including those responsible for the administration of justice, have developed only a limited capacity to cope with this legacy. The government has stated it will require until 2002 to meet the target of increasing its tax burden (at about 10% of GDP, currently the lowest in the region) to 12% of GDP.

During the Presidential race, the FRG organized what will later be known as Black Thursday (Jueves negro). The FRG organized its partisans from the country and brought them to the city. The FRG gave them transport, food, a shelter for the night, and meter long sticks. With these sticks, the participants ran through the streets wreaking havoc on the public infrastructure. During this day a journalist of Prensa Libre (a leading newspaper) was killed.

The media, which have a tradition of being independent and free,[According to whom?] took it very personally and for the next month, every headline was about these events, and the participation of the ruling party in this day of terror. The FRG was protesting the ruling of the TSE (supreme electoral tribunal) to ban the FRG candidate Efrain Rios Mont from the race. The TSE argued that as a formal putschist, he was banned by the constitution from ever becoming president. The FRG argued that since the events in which the former general participated predate the constitution, he was eligible for presidential office. Common sense argued that if such a clause was not retroactive by nature it would have no point.

Since 2004 Óscar Berger of the GANA (a coalition of political parties rather than a single one) won the elections, this was the first government in the history of democratic Guatemala that did not have an overwhelming majority in Congress. After he took office in January 2004 it was made public that the FRG had wildly ransacked the government going to the extremes of stealing computer equipment and objects of historic importance. Alfonso Portillo fled to Mexico with an impressive amount of money stolen from military funds, the national hospital, and the revenue service. Guatemala made a formal request for the deportation of Portillo to face charges of embezzlement, however, Mexico has never revoked diplomatic asylum once it is granted to a person.

Though the constitution says nothing about it, the vice president runs the government like a prime minister while the president deals with foreign affairs, this can be seen regularly as the VP stands in for the president in many events that are traditionally presided by the President of the Republic.

Criminality has reached staggering proportions: about 200 murders per month and it is starting to affect the economy as many companies prefer to leave the country than face the growing corruption and insecurity. One significant problem is the ongoing gang warfare between the M18 (Mara Dieciocho) and the MS (Mara Salvatrucha). These are two rival street gangs comprising loosely linked international franchise organizations, who wield a power somewhat like that of the US mafia of the 1930s and are for the moment above and beyond the grasp of the law. They hold territory under their control and extort "taxes" (la renta) from it.

They are not yet involved in high-level organized trafficking. That industry is of a different class of organized crime in Guatemala, with Mexican smugglers and top-ranking Guatemalan police officials regularly making headlines being caught with hundreds of kilograms of cocaine.

The mara phenomenon originated in the United States in the 1980s, specifically in Los Angeles, among refugees fleeing civil wars in El Salvador and Guatemala. Later many members of the maras were deported from the United States to their countries of origin, and during the 1990s this has helped fuel the spread of the two gangs across the United States, Mexico, El Salvador, Guatemala, Honduras, and even Italy and Spain. There is a zone of Guatemala City, "El Gallito" which is recognized as being outside of Government control, it belongs to the drug lords that inhabit it. Barrio "El Gallito" is located in Zone 3, three kilometres (2 mi) away from the National Palace where the Government's offices are located.

Drug trafficking has reached staggering proportions in Guatemala, with corruption extending to top positions of many branches of government. Various narco-mafias vie for control of the remote northern jungle regions of Petén, where drugs, arms, and people all cross the border into Mexico, mostly bound for the United States. Drug trafficking is undoubtedly the greatest threat to political freedom in Guatemala today.

Guatemala is plagued by lynchings which severely blemish the country's humans rights record as a violation of due process of law.

The Berger administration has been hailed in some circles for its work in devolution. Guatemala has always been a strongly centralized state and the administration sought to take halt the growing pre-eminence of the Capital. For example, the administration has engaged in mobile cabinets where the President and all his ministers will go into the country and change the seat of power every so often, to be "closer to the people".

The administration is facing growing financial difficulties, potentially in part due to 60% of the population being considered "poor" and therefore ineligible for taxation. The SAT (superintendence of tributary administration), the revenue service, is therefore obligated to tax the middle class which is starting to suffer under the burden. The SAT has become stringent in its application of the law seeking the full penalties of incarceration for tax evasion.

In September 2006 the PNC (civil national police), in a joint action with the national military took by storm the Pavon detention centre, a prison with 1,500 inmates which until that date hadn't been requisitioned for 10 years and which was a hub of criminal activity. Some inmates, the guard of the chief of the mafioso what ran the prison and the leader himself resisted the onslaught of forces of law with AK-47 and handguns, they were massacred. Around 3,000 infantry and 4 tanks participated in the action. This was a milestone in the history of Guatemala and made national headlines.

2006 saw the dismemberment of the GANA in the face of the 2007 elections. It fractured into many parties, damaging the ability of the government to get legislation through Congress.

In the November 2007, second round presidential elections, Álvaro Colom of the UNE was elected president, defeating ex-general Otto Perez Molina of the PP. And in 2011, Retired General Otto Pérez Molina of the Patriotic Party won the presidential election in a runoff against populist Manuel Baldizón of the LIDER party. Pérez Molina assumed office on 14 January 2012, and his vice president is Roxana Baldetti. In September 2015, President Otto Perez Molina resigned because of bribery allegations.

In October 2015 presidential election, former TV comedian Jimmy Morales was elected as the new President of Guatemala after huge anti-corruption demonstrations. He took office in January 2016. In January 2020, Alejandro Giammattei replaced Jimmy Morales as the President of Guatemala. Giammattei had won the presidential election in August 2019 with his "tough-on-crime" agenda. In August 2023, Bernardo Arevalo, the candidate of the centre-left Semilla (Seed) Movement, had a landslide victory in Guatemala's presidential election. On 15 January 2024, Bernardo Arévalo was sworn in as Guatemala's president.

== See also ==
- Censorship in Guatemala
- Central American Parliament
