= Mario Taracena =

Guatemalan politician

The Honourable Mario Taracena Díaz-Sol
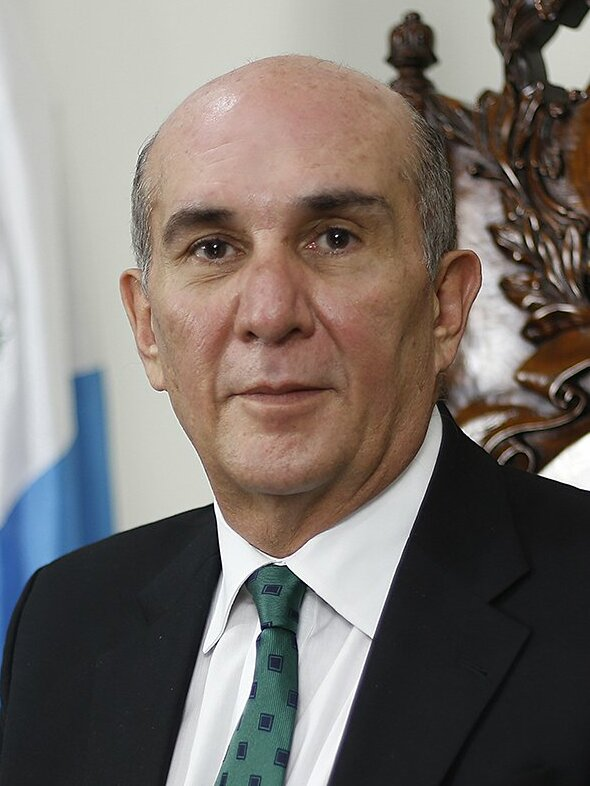
- Official portrait

President of the Congress of Guatemala
- In office 14 January 2016 – 14 January 2017
- Vice President: Iván Arévalo; Felipe Alejos; Roberto Castañeda
- Preceded by: Luis Rabbé
- Succeeded by: Óscar Chinchilla

Personal details
- Born: 6 May 1957 (age 69) Guatemala City, Guatemala
- Party: Unión del Centro Nacional; National Advancement Party; National Unity of Hope
- Education: Rafael Landívar University

Mario Taracena Díaz-Sol (born 6 May 1957) is a Guatemalan politician. He was President of the Congress of Guatemala from January 2016 to January 2017. Taracena started his political career in 1984 and since then has served multiple times in the Congress, as well as a term in the Central American Parliament.

== Early life ==
Taracena was born on 6 May 1957 in Guatemala City. He grew up in an economically well-off family. Both his father and grandfathers were involved in politics. His father was a founding member of the National Liberation Movement, as an opponent of Miguel Ydígoras Fuentes, he was exiled twice.

Mario Taracena followed a part of his education at the Liceo Guatemala and later obtained a degree at the Faculty of Economics of the Rafael Landívar University.

== Political career ==
Taracena served in the Constituent Assembly of Guatemala between 1984 and 1986 for the Unión del Centro Nacional (UCN). He had been one of the founders of the party in 1983. Taracena was member of the Congress of Guatemala for the UCN from 1986 to 1991, and once again from 1991 to 1993. He left the party after a conflict with Jorge Carpio Nicolle. He was member of the Central American Parliament for the National Advancement Party (PAN) between 1995 and 2000. Taracena was also one of the founders of the PAN in 1989. He left the PAN after a conflict with Rubén Darío Morales. In 2004 Taracena once again obtained a domestic political office when he became member of the Congress for the National Unity of Hope (UNE). He completed his first term for the party in 2008 and a second in 2012. Taracena was reelected in the 2015 elections, obtaining a seat for the National List.

On 14 January 2016 Taracena was elected President of the Congress, receiving 120 out of 157 votes. He succeeded Luis Rabbé. Shortly after taking office Taracena stated that his main goal was to obtain reforms to the Ley Orgánica del Organismo Legislativo, so that public confidence in the Congress would be raised after having been lowered due to power abuse and corruption. He was succeeded by Óscar Chinchilla as President of the Congress on 14 January 2017.

== Personal life ==
Taracena is a Catholic. He is married and has three daughters and one son.
