= Guillermo W. Méndez =

Guatemalan theologian

Guillermo W. Méndez (born 1955) is a Guatemalan theologian, educated in Guatemala, Central America, and in North America. After two decades serving as a Theology Professor in Guatemala, deeply challenged by Liberation Theology, he researched Law, Economics and Politics. Former member of the Latin American Theological Fraternity and the theological commission of the World Evangelical Fellowship, he developed a concern for the poor and engaged in the transformation of the Civil Law system of his native Guatemala, to undermine the privileges of the ruling political class and reform, through political and legal means, the State of Guatemala.

Professor Méndez has proposed the celebration of a national and international day of Freedom of Conscience, a celebration growing since 2003 in Guatemala, to call attention to the intromission of the legal system in matters of conscience, and to rethink the participation of Christians in political and social change. Founder of the Institute of Services to the Nation (ISN), a private funded civic organization registered in the Supreme Electoral Tribunal, ISN teaches and organizes population for change from a Judeo Christian perspective. Professor Méndez team teaches History of Religion in Universidad Francisco Marroquín, Guatemala.

== Bibliography ==
Author of:

- A Life Patterned After Responsibility. Guatemala: Ha-aretz. 2005.
- Raising Kids for Responsibility: Teaching Values in a Valueless Society. Guatemala: Ha-aretz. 2006.
- The Church Faces Responsibility. Guatemala: Ha-aretz. 2006.
- The "Yes" of the Gospel and the Protestant "No": The Reformation five hundred years later.
- An Introduction to Evangelical Dogmatics.

Contributor to:

- Ed. D. A. Carson (2002). Right With God: Justice in the Bible and the World. Wipf & Stock Publishers..
- Ed. D. A. Carson (2002). Worship Adoration and Action. Wipf & Stock Publishers..

== Education ==
- B. A. Central American Theological Seminary (1978)
- S. T. M. Dallas Theological Seminary (1982)
- M. A. S. Universidad Francisco Marroquín (1994)
