= Atlas Libertas =

Atlas Libertas is a sculpture placed on the main façade that welcomes visitors in the Business School Building at Universidad Francisco Marroquín (UFM), in Guatemala.

The monument was made as a tribute to the spirit of enterprise and creative power of the individual, in the frame of the celebration of the 50th anniversary of the publication of Atlas Shrugged, the novel written by Ayn Rand. This artwork responds to the mission of the university: “to teach and disseminate the ethical, legal, and overall economic principles of a society of free and responsible persons”.

It's a high-relief sculpture of a human figure supporting the universe, seen from the back from head to hip. The universe is represented by a series of semicircles (abstract planets and gear mechanisms). The sculpture is made of brass plate with a cyan-colored finish resembling oxidized copper. Atlas Libertas is 4.5 x 4.5 meters. It was created by the sculptor Walter Peter Brenner, and was unveiled on October 11, 2007.

The sculpture includes a quote from the Part III, chapter VII of Atlas Shrugged:

"Do not let your fire go out, spark by irreplaceable spark, in the hopeless swamps of the approximate, the not-quite, the not-yet, the not-at-all. Do not let the hero in your soul perish, in lonely frustration for the life you deserved, but have never been able to reach. Check your road and the nature of your battle. The world you desired can be won, it exists, it is real, it is possible, it's yours."
