= Center for the Study of Capitalism =

University center in Guatemala

- Abbreviation: CSC
- Formation: 2009
- Type: Public policy think tank
- Headquarters: 6 calle final. zona 10. Campus UFM.
- Location: Guatemala City
- Website: http://capitalismo.ufm.edu/index.php/Página_principal

The Center for the Study of Capitalism (CSC) is a Guatemalan think tank and University Research Centre of Study founded in 2009 with the support of Universidad Francisco Marroquin. Its stated mission is "to promote discussion and reflection in order to encourage the adoption of a philosophy of life that leads a person to champion reason, individual rights, capitalism and entrepreneurial activity". CSC is a private, secular, coeducational, nonresidential, nonprofit center of study supported primarily by grants and contributions from foundations, corporations, and individuals. It is headquartered in Guatemala City, Guatemala

== Personnel ==
=== Officers and trustees ===
CSC's current executive director is the philosopher and architect Warren Orbaugh. The Centre is sponsored by Universidad Francisco Marroquin.

== Research programs ==
CSC's research is divided upon socratic dialogue sessions with high school students and young entrepreneurs to study values as guides to excellence in thinking and action. Their dialogues elaborate into six broad categories: economic history, philosophy, individual rights, political and public opinion studies, social and cultural studies, and legal and constitutional studies. AEI scholars' research is presented at socratic dialogues, lectures, and colloquiums in Guatemala City, Guatemala.

== See also ==
- Universidad Francisco Marroquin
