= Canal 8 (Guatemala) =

First television station in Guatemala

TGW-TV
- Guatemala City; Guatemala
- Channels: Analog: 8 (VHF)

Ownership
- Sister stations: TGW radio

History
- First air date: September 18, 1955
- Last air date: 1961

Technical information
- ERP: 200 watts

Canal 8 was the first television station to broadcast in Guatemala, operating in Guatemala City from September 18, 1955, to 1961. The station, owned by the government, failed due to lack of funds.

== History ==
Plans had existed for television in Guatemala as early as 1953, but it was not until September 18, 1955, two days after tests were conducted, when the first official television broadcast was made in Guatemala, with the first image seen on channel 8 being that of Mexican singer Pedro Vargas singing the Our Father. Just 40 television sets existed at the time, all of them in the historic center of Guatemala City.

The original facilities were an improvised studio in the National Palace, supported by American engineers, which operated for about a month. At that time, management of the new station was taken over by government radio station TGW and moved into the National Typography Building, which offered improved facilities and a much better audio chain. The station extended its broadcast day to as long as five hours. However, its limited power curtailed its reach to the center of Guatemala City.

Not long before its closure, on September 30, 1961, the station began airing commercial advertisements; the day before, a fire had destroyed the country's only commercial television station, Canal 3. The station closed not long after due to slow technical decline and a lack of funding.
