= Canal 11 (Guatemalan TV channel) =

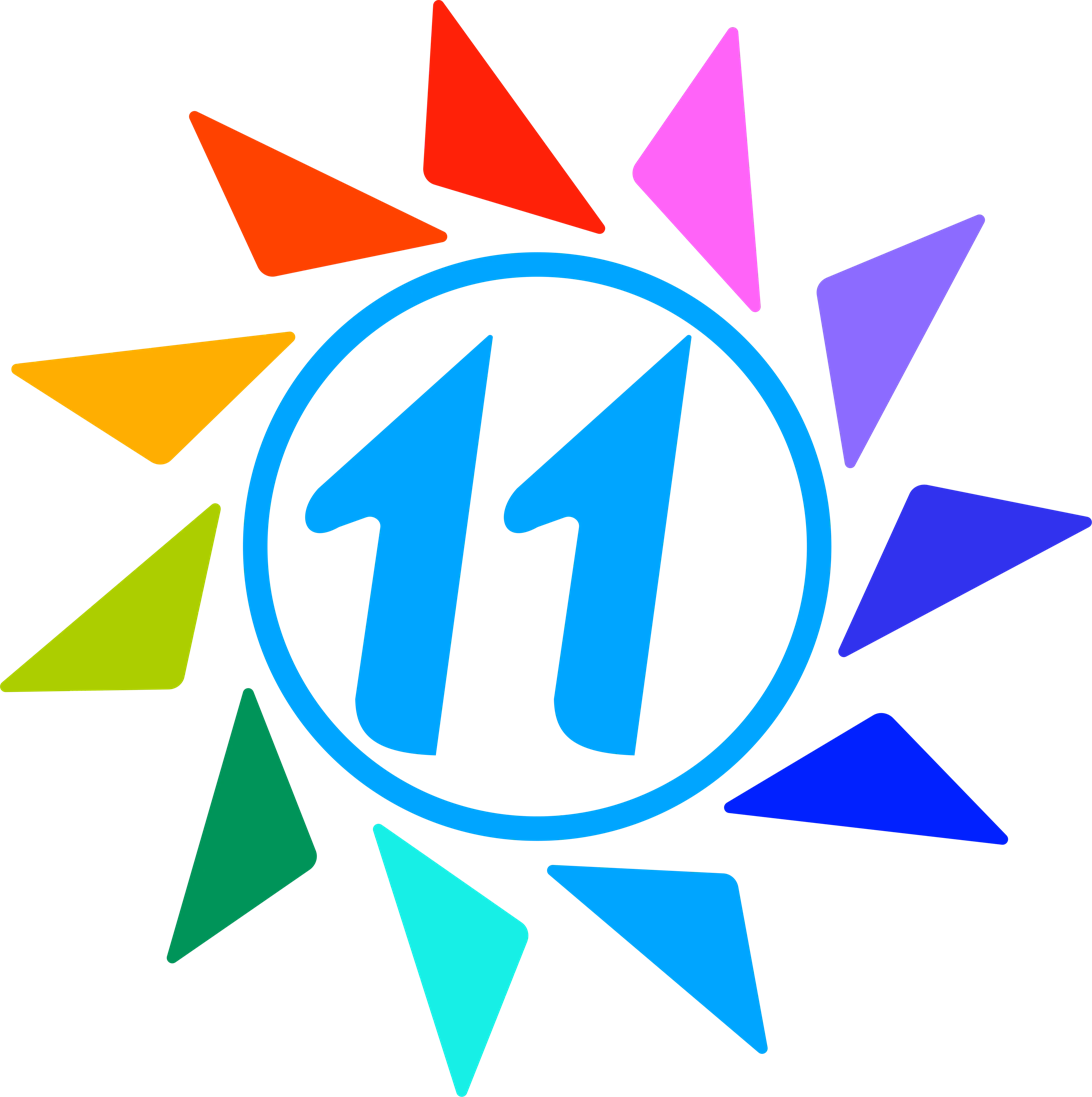
- Logo used since November 2022
- Country: Guatemala
- Headquarters: Guatemala City

Programming
- Language: Spanish
- Picture format: 1080i HDTV

Ownership
- Owner: Chapin TV (Albavisión)
- Sister channels: Canal 3 Canal 7 Canal 13; TN23

History
- Launched: 25 October 1966
- Former names: Teleonce (1966-2022)

Links
- Website: www.chapintv.com

Availability

Terrestrial
- Analog VHF: Channel 11

Streaming media
- Tele Latino: Channel 092; Channel 1027

Canal 11, formerly known as TeleOnce is a television station headquartered in Guatemala City, Guatemala, with repeaters throughout the country. The network and stations broadcast in the NTSC format.

It is one of the five stations operated by Radio y Televisión de Guatemala, who also operate channels 3, 7, 13 and 23; all of which are linked to Remigio Ángel González through his Albavisión group. The channel specializes in animated series, TV shows and movies.

== History ==
The Guatemalan government issued a license for channel 11 in 1960, announcing on December 27 that year as "Voz e Imagen de Centroamérica" on an advertisement at the El Imparcial newspaper, promising an 8,000-watt antenna and a budget of 25,000 quetzales. Before starting operations, the channel failed to begin operations, having failed its initial April 1961 target; the station faced legal problems on February 9, 1962, before the government suspended its license on March 6 the same year.

The current station was founded between October 1966 and February 1967 with mixed Guatemalan and Honduran capitals; financing came from Guatemalan businessmen and the channel was led by the Honduran Antonio Mourra. Mourra later started channel 13, which later joined Asociación de Televisoras de Centroamérica y Panamá as a founding member.

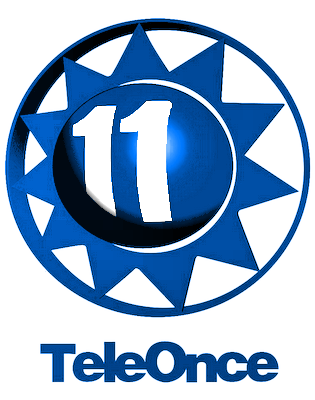
Former Teleonce logo from 2002 to 2022.
