= Luis Rabbé =

Politician and business man of Guatemala

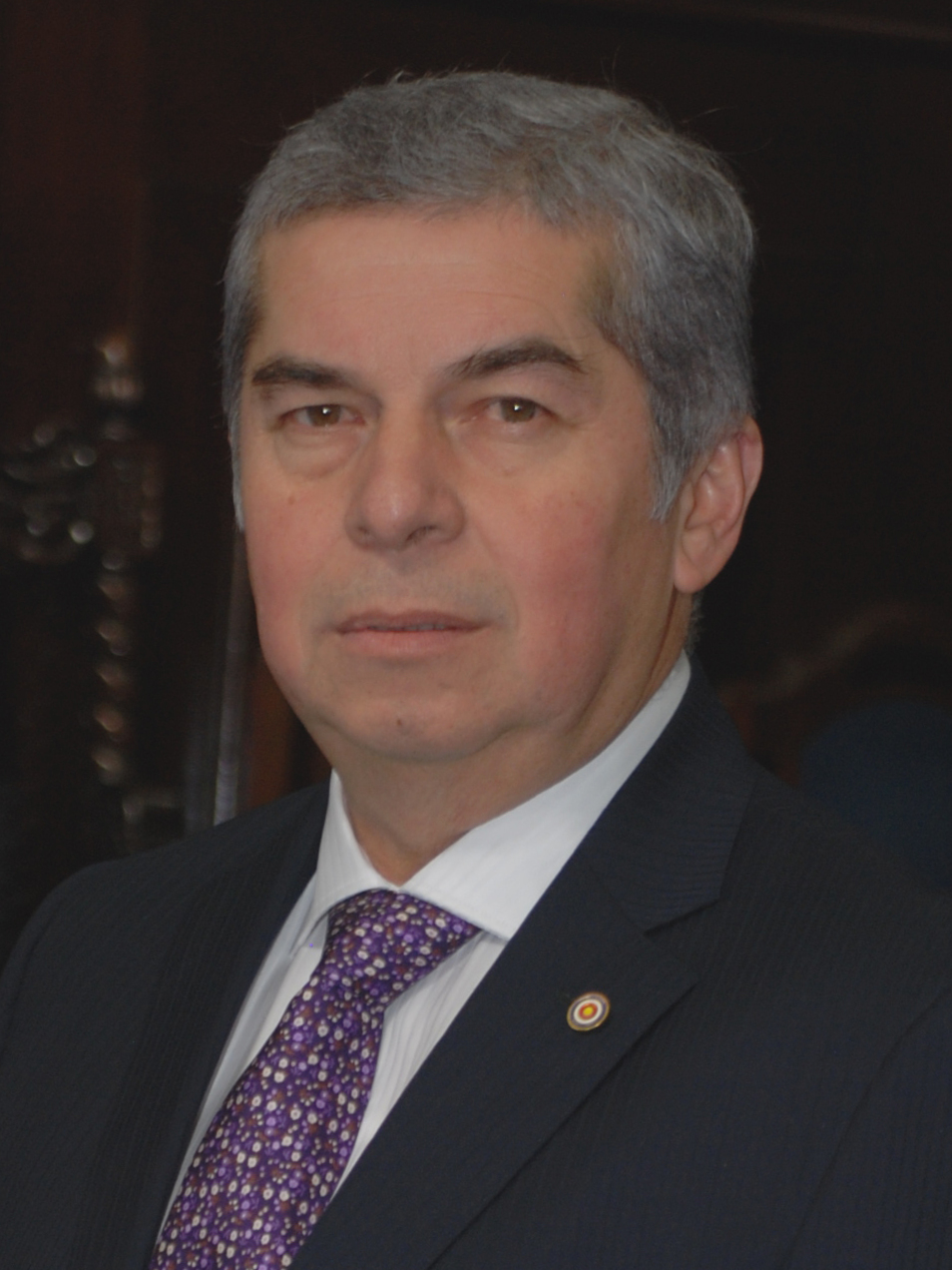
- Official portrait, 2012

President of the Congress of Guatemala
- In office 14 January 2015 – 14 January 2016
- Vice President: Arístides Crespo (First); Julio López (Second); Selvin García (Third)
- Preceded by: Arístides Crespo
- Succeeded by: Mario Taracena

Member of the Congress of Guatemala
- In office 14 January 2012 – 22 September 2016
- Constituency: National List

Minister of Communications
- In office January 2000 – June 2001
- President: Alfonso Portillo

Personal details
- Born: 26 May 1956 (age 70)
- Party: Guatemalan Republic Front (before 2012); National Change Union (until March 2012); Independent (since March 2012)

Luis Armando Rabbé Tejada (born 26 May 1956) is a Guatemalan politician and media entrepreneur. He was President of the Congress of Guatemala between 14 January 2015 and 14 January 2016. Rabbé was elected to the Congress of Guatemala in the 2011 elections for the National List under the banner of National Change Union. Three months after being installed he became an independent member. In the 2015 general election Rabbé ran once more for the National List, this time as the number two of the Renewed Democratic Liberty (LIDER).

As member of the Guatemalan Republic Front (FRG) Rabbé unsuccessfully ran for the office of mayor of Guatemala City in 1999. He subsequently served as Minister of Communications in the government of Alfonso Portillo between 2000 and 2001. In the 2007 presidential election Rabbé was an unsuccessful candidate for the FRG.

== Career and media ==
Rabbé was born on 26 May 1956.

Rabbé had a career in media. He was president of Televisiete, director of Radio Sonaro and later of Noti 7. Rabbé has also been an investor and director of the magazine Proceso.

== Political career ==
In 1999 Rabbé started his political career. In the 1999 general elections he ran for the position of mayor of Guatemala City for the Guatemalan Republic Front (FRG). He lost against Fritz García Gallont.

In the same 1999 general elections Alfonso Portillo was elected president. Rabbé served in his government as Minister of Communication between January 2000 and June 2001. Rabbé was a presidential candidate for the FRG in the 2007 elections, he obtained 7,29% of the vote in the first round and was eliminated from the race.

The contacts Rabbé build up during his time as Minister gave him the opportunity to successfully run for Congress in the 2011 elections under the banner of National Change Union of Mario Estrada. Estrada had also served in the government of Portillo. Three months after being installed as Deputy Rabbé resigned from the National Change Union and became an independent member of Congress. He is a Deputy for the National List.

Rabbé ran for the office of President of the Congress in 2013, but saw his attempt fail due to lack of support of Roberto Alejos and his party Todos. On 30 October 2014 was elected as President of the Congress, he was elected at the same time as the other members of the governing council. The group received 85 votes in favor and took office on 14 January 2015. Large parts of the opposition were absent during the vote. The group received support from the Patriotic Party and National Unity of Hope. As President, Rabbé succeeded Arístides Crespo, who was elected first vice-president.

In the 2015 general election Rabbé ran once more for the National List, this time as the number two of the Renewed Democratic Liberty (LIDER) list.

Rabbé's term as President of the Congress ended on 14 January 2016, he was succeeded by Mario Taracena. In April 2016 Rabbé switched parties to Alianza Ciudadana, becoming the last deputy to be allowed to do so in the term of Congress.

In 2016 Rabbé became target of investigation in the plazas fantasmas scandal involving members of Congress. The investigation was led by the public prosecution service and the Comisión Internacional contra la Impunidad en Guatemala. Rabbé and Arístides Crespo were seen as leaders of a group of seven deputies involved in abuse of power, misuse of state money and illegally appointing people to positions in government. Rabbé claimed immunity on charges against him. The Corte Suprema de Justicia de Guatemala however lifted his immunity in August 2016. In August Rabbé wrote a letter to Congress President Mario Taracena asking him to allow him to be absent from the Congress for a one-month period. He stated to wish to have some personal meetings abroad in relation to the charges against him. Rabbé meanwhile flew to Mexico City. On 5 September an arrest warrant for Rabbé was made public. On 22 September Rabbé lost his seat in the Congress and was temporarily replaced by Fernando García Gudiel.

== Personal life ==
Rabbé's brother Alfredo is a politician as well. Like his brother he was elected to Congress in 2011 for the National Change Union and left the party at the same time to continue as independent.

Luis Rabbé is brother-in-law to Mexican media entrepreneur Remigio Ángel González. González donated $2.6 million to the 1999 Presidential campaign of Alfonso Portillo. After becoming President, Portillo named Rabbé Minister of Communication.
