= Telesistema Informativo =

Honduran television station

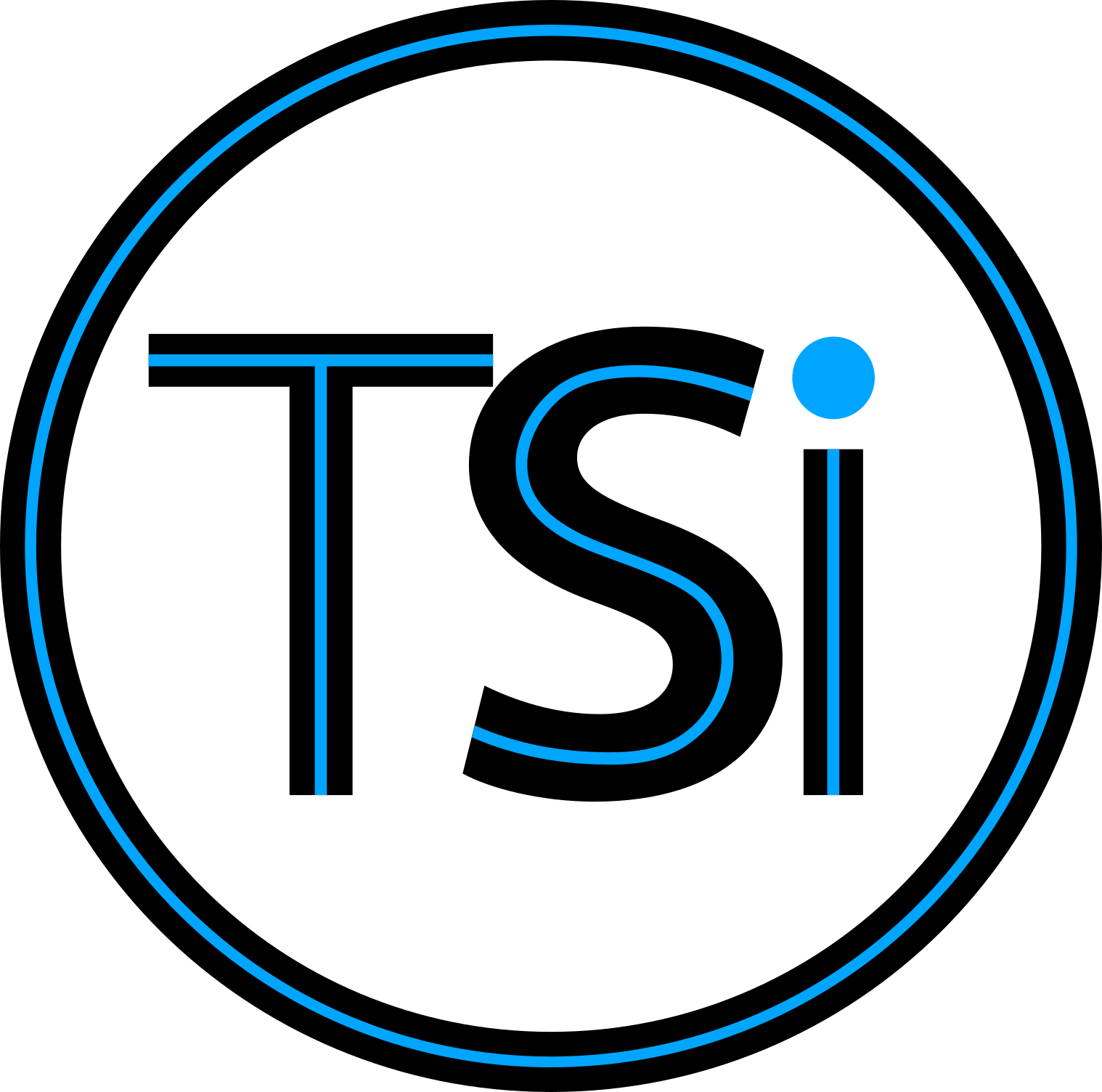
- Type: Spanish-language broadcast television network
- Country: Honduras
- Headquarters: Tegucigalpa, Honduras

Programming
- Picture format: 1080i HDTV

Ownership
- Owner: Corporación Televicentro
- Key people: Rafael Ferrari (President)

History
- Launched: December 27, 1967; 58 years ago
- Former names: Canales 3 y 7 (1967-2000); Telesistema (2000-2016)

Links
- Website: https://www.televicentro.com

Availability

Terrestrial
- Analog VHF: Channel 3 (Center Zone); Channel 7 (North Zone)

Telesistema Informativo (known as TSi) is a television station in Tegucigalpa, Honduras, broadcasting on Channel 3 and Channel 7 in NTSC and is owned by TVC. The station has repeaters in La Ceiba and Puerto Cortés, also on channel 7. Until 2016, the channel had programs of news, entertainment, series, sports and movies.

The station launched on December 27, 1967 (as Telesistema Hondureño) with a budget of 150,000 lempiras. By 1976, the station's budget was worth 427,274 lempiras and annual operating costs were worth 26,000 lempiras.

García Ardón joined the San Pedro Sula station (channel 7) in 1967 to present a weekly news program on Sundays before being promoted to anchorman of Telediario from 1969, where he remained until 2013.

In July 1974, the station started broadcasting to Tegucigalpa on channel 3.

In 1987, the station was integrated into the new Televicentro Corporation.

On December 15, 2016, its logo and programming were changed, changing its name to TSi (Telesistema Informativo) and format to a 24-hour news channel.
