= Solidarity Action Movement =

Solidarity Action Movement Movimiento de Acción Solidaria
- Leader: Jorge Serrano Elías
- Founded: 1986
- Dissolved: 1996
- Ideology: Conservatism; Populism
- Political position: Right-wing
- Colors: Red

The Solidarity Action Movement (Spanish: Movimiento de Acción Solidaria, MAS) was a conservative political party in Guatemala founded in 1986 and dissolved in 1996.
