= Telecadena 7/4 =

- Type: Spanish-language broadcast television network
- Country: Honduras
- Headquarters: Tegucigalpa, Honduras

Programming
- Picture format: 1080i HDTV

Ownership
- Owner: Corporación Televicentro
- Key people: Rafael Ferrari (President)

History
- Launched: July 29, 1985; 40 years ago
- Former names: HRLP-TV

Links
- Website: http://www.televicentro.com

Availability

Terrestrial
- Analog VHF: Channel 7 (Center Zone); Channel 4 (North Zone)

Telecadena 7 y 4 is a Honduran over-the-air television channel, owned by the Televicentro corporation. Its name is due to the two frequencies that the channel occupies to transmit nationally, VHF channel 7 of Tegucigalpa and VHF channel 4 of San Pedro Sula. The channel carries programs from Univision.

Its programming is general in nature, with programs for an adult audience in the mornings and afternoons.

== History ==
Rafael Ferrari launched Telecadena (legal name Centroamericana de Televisión) on July 29, 1985; the Ferrari family later merged Telecadena with other television stations under their control two years later to create the current Televicentro. After the creation of Televicentro, a news unit for the channel Telenoticieros y Documentales, S.A., was created, for the purpose of Abriendo Brecha, its newscast. Abriendo Brecha was long known for Wong Arévalo's comments against US interference in Honduran politics.

In September 2020, the channel aired Vencer el Miedo, a telenovela produced by Televicentro in association with the government countering gender violence. The channel has also aired Korean animated series (in recent years) and dramas (since 2024).
