= Manuel Ayau =

Founder of the Universidad Francisco Marroquín (1925–2010)

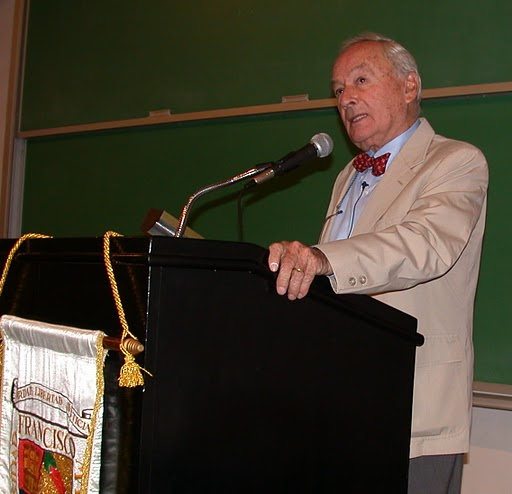
- Born: December 27, 1925; Guatemala City, Guatemala
- Died: August 4, 2010 (aged 84); Guatemala
- Education: Hillsdale College; Louisiana State University
- Occupation: Businessperson
- Known for: Founder of Francisco Marroquín University

Manuel Francisco Ayau Cordón (December 27, 1925 – August 4, 2010) was the founder of the Universidad Francisco Marroquín in Guatemala. He was born in Guatemala City, on December 27, 1925. After diverse studies, he obtained a B.S. in mechanical engineering from Louisiana State University in 1950, an L.H.D. from Hillsdale College in 1973, and an honorary degree in law (Legum Doctor) from Northwood University in 1994.

== Scholarly and laboral contributions ==
Ayau is CEO of Samboro, S.A., a company dedicated to the production of ceramic tiles, and directed a group of Guatemalan industrialists for over forty years in the production of industrial gases and hydro-electric energy. Ayau has also served on the board of directors of several different companies, including IBM in Latin America and the Guatemalan local stock and debt exchange, of which he was founding president.

In 1959 Ayau founded the Center for Economic and Social Studies in Guatemala, to analyze the fundaments and philosophy of free society. In 1972 he was instrumental in founding the Francisco Marroquín University, of which he was the first president, serving until 1988.

A member of the Mont Pelerin Society since 1964, Ayau was its president from 1978 to 1980. He was on the board of directors of the Liberty Fund in Indianapolis and he was also a trustee of the Foundation for Economic Education in New York. He was also a member of the Philadelphia Society.

In Guatemala, Ayau entered politics as a member of congress from 1970 to 1974, and as presidential candidate in the 1990 elections.

Twice he has formed part of the central bank council and has been president of two different commercial banks, vice-president of the National Electrification Institute, trustee of the Philadelphia Society, and honorary member of the engineering society "Tau Beta Pi".

His last contribution to Guatemala was as president of Asociacion Civil proReforma del Estado de Guatemala.

In 2004 he was awarded by the Mont Pelerin Society for his contributions to freedom. Ayau obtained the Adam Smith Award from the Association of Private Enterprise Education in 2005. He obtained the Juan de Mariana Award, from the Instituto Juan de Mariana, in Spain, in 2008. That year, at the Universidad Peruana de Ciencias Applicadas, he was appointed honorary professor.

== Works ==
Among his most important works are "Como Mejorar el Nivel de Vida", "De Robinson a Viernes", "El Comercio", "La Década Perdida", "El Proceso Económico", "No Tenemos que Seguir Siendo Pobres para Siempre" and "Un Juego que no suma cero". He has been published widely in Guatemala and Latin America, as well as in the US, including in "Vision", "The Wall Street Journal", and "The Freeman".
