= Canal 5 (Honduras) =

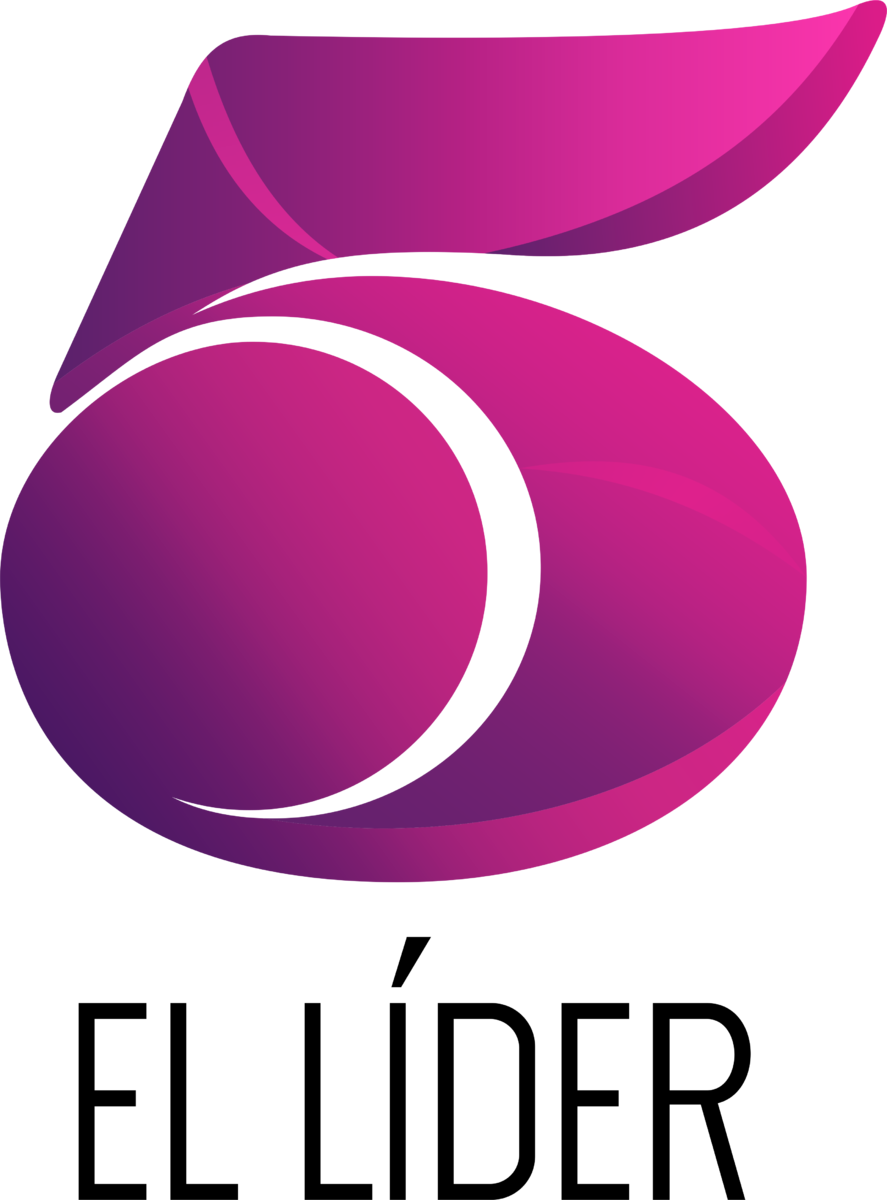
- Type: Spanish-language broadcast television network
- Country: Honduras
- Headquarters: Tegucigalpa, Honduras

Programming
- Picture format: 1080i HDTV

Ownership
- Owner: Corporación Televicentro
- Key people: Rafael Ferrari (President)

History
- Launched: September 15, 1959
- Former names: HRTG-TV

Links
- Website: https://www.televicentro.com

Availability

Terrestrial
- Analog VHF: Channel 5 (Center Zone); Channel 9 (North Zone)

Canal 5 (Canal Cinco), is a Honduran terrestrial television channel, owned by the Ferrari family and operated by the Televicentro Corporation. Its first official broadcast was on September 15, 1959.

Channel 5's programming consists mainly of telenovelas, entertainment programs, both national and foreign production, game shows and newscasts. On weekends it broadcasts unitary series, comedies, movies and special events.

The channel, as well as the others that are part of the corporation, owns the broadcasting rights to the FIFA World Cup, matches of the Honduran senior soccer team and the broadcast of matches from the National Professional Soccer League of Honduras.

== History ==
In June 1958, Honduran businessman Fernando Lardizabal García studied the possibility of a television service for Honduras. In a visit to Mexico City, he and his son-in-law Miguel Brooks sat at the lobby of a hotel, watching Mexican television. Miguel told Fernando that television would be a "lucrative business" that should be brought to Honduras. Upon their return to Honduras, the businessmen carried out the procedures at the Directorate General of Telecommunications of Honduras with the aim of acquiring the license required to install the transmitter and, subsequently, begin its operations.

On January 26, 1959, Compañía Televisora Hondureña S.A. (HRTG-TV Canal 5) was founded with mixed capital work 180 thousand lempiras. 55% of the shares were held by Fernando Lardizábal and Miguel Brooks, 30% by the American ABC television network, and 15% by Rene Sempé and Raúl Zelaya. The first test broadcasts were held on September 15 of the same year, to 25 monochrome television sets in Tegucigalpa and the signal came from the Cantagallo hill - behind Santa Lucía - covering 96.56 km. The first president of the channel was Fernando Lardizábal, the manager Miguel Brooks, the head of operations Antonio Lardizábal, and the sales promoter and head of programming was the Mexican Mario Reconco. The launch date was selected as it coincided with the 130th anniversary of the country's independence, where the significance of the date could never be forgotten, according to the founders.

All of the equipment used for the station was acquired at RCA, who signed the purchase and sale with the local distributor Francisco J. Yones, local representative Eng. Guaragna, and for the television station, Lic. Fernando Lardizábal father and Miguel Brooks son.

The first live program was Las Letras Pagan ("The Letters Pay") sponsored by El Indio coffee and produced by Luis Valentine, it was hosted by Nahúm Valladares. The content offer slowly increased, led by entertainers such as Mario López Urquía, Omar de Jesús García, Pedro René Gonzáles and later Rafael Zavala.

Its first news program emerged at the end of 1959, whose presenter was Gustavo Acosta Mejía and was sponsored by the national airline SAHSA, but was quickly replaced. The rest of the programming was a package of Spanish-dubbed American television series that ABC supplied under an agreement with the stations it set up, and whose dubbing was made in Puerto Rico or Mexico. Among the series aired in the monochrome period of the channel included The Rifleman with Chuck Connors, Naked City, Bat Masterson, Mannix, Bonanza, Lassie, Highway Patrol, The Invaders, Daktari and other features such as The Three Stooges' theatrical shorts, cartoons and the series Peyton Place. These imported programs were kinescoped. Due to the lack of assistance from other sources, the channel's initial decade was heavily influenced by American imports.

The second news program, Telerápidas, was directed by Vicente Machado Valle Jr., and aired from 1961 to 1966. Its content came from video footage from the AP news agency, the three American networks and the UPI. Initially it was weekly before becoming daily. Additionally, there was Telediario, with a more political output, at noon, which ended in 1963 due to the coup against the president in October that year. With the political shift, Telerápidas became its replacement. In 1960, mobile units were added, easing the need to broadcast live local sporting events. That same year it broadcast President Ramón Villeda Morales' new year speech. ABC left the company in 1963, and José Rafael Ferrari acquired the shares of the Lardizábal family and Brooks. Ferrari was the owner of Honduras's most important radio network at the time, HRN. In December 1964, the station received its first satellite signals; first from the Vatican, and then the moon landing in 1969.

Between 1963 and 1970, Canal 5 started increasing the amount of national programming on offer. Among them was Ante la Prensa (Facing the Press), whose goal was to boost support for Oswaldo López Arellano and legitimize his position. Later, El consultorio del aire, a viewer phone-in program, premiered, where viewers asked questions related to legal issues, health or work. From radio came Vista, a weekly newsmagazine.

In 1965, the company became the property of Rafael Ferrari and his partner Manuel Villeda Toledo, who in 1966 moved to their current location on Suyapa Boulevard, which is now used by Televicentro.

The channel's first telenovela was also the first program to be shown in color, Muñeca from Mexico, thanks to an agreement with Televisa that had just started. The channel had previously tested color broadcasts in 1966.

Facing the political crisis of the mid-1980s, Rafael Ferrari signed Canal 5 up for a Salvadorean-backed commercial television group, ATELCAP.

In 1987, the channel became a part of Corporación Televicentro, becoming its main channel.

In 1980 and 1990, Canal 5 premiered new national content, the sports program Cinco Deportivo and the game show X-0 Da Dinero. Both were presented by Salvador Nasralla, which became the country's "Mr. Television". In order to gain a morning slot, the channel premiered La Mujer Ahora, presented by Delia Mejía.

With the fall of the Callejas administration, the channel premiered its current newscast, Telenoticias (TN5) in 1994. Even after the effects of Hurricane Mitch, the television industry developed further. The three channels premiered a combined morning newscast, TVC, in 2000, which was subsequently renamed to TN5 Matutino in 2010, from then on, it was limited to Canal 5. The creation of a morning newscast facilitated the creation of Frente a Frente, a political debate. Also in the early 2000s, the channel signed an agreement with Telemundo, on top of the existing telenovelas from Televisa. This consolidated its position as the channel with "the best telenovelas of the Americas".

The group avoided talking about the 2009 Honduran coup d'état, in a period marked by increasing social and media polarization. Later on in the year, Televicentro legitimized the coup and its channels strengthened their credibility relations with the viewers.

From 2012, the channel started broadcasting 24/7, filling the overnight schedule with movies and repeats of national productions.
