= Universidad Francisco Marroquín =

Private, secular university in Guatemala

Coordinates: 14.6051°N 90.5062°W

- Motto: La enseñanza y difusión de los principios éticos, jurídicos y económicos de una sociedad de personas libres y responsables.
- Motto in English: To teach and disseminate the ethical, legal, and economic principles of a society of free and responsible persons.
- Type: Private
- Endowment: 1971
- President: Ricardo Castillo A.
- Students: 2700
- Location: Guatemala City, Guatemala
- Campus: 6a. Calle Final, Calle Manuel F. Ayau, Zona 10
- Colors: Red and white
- Nickname: UFM
- Website: ufm.edu
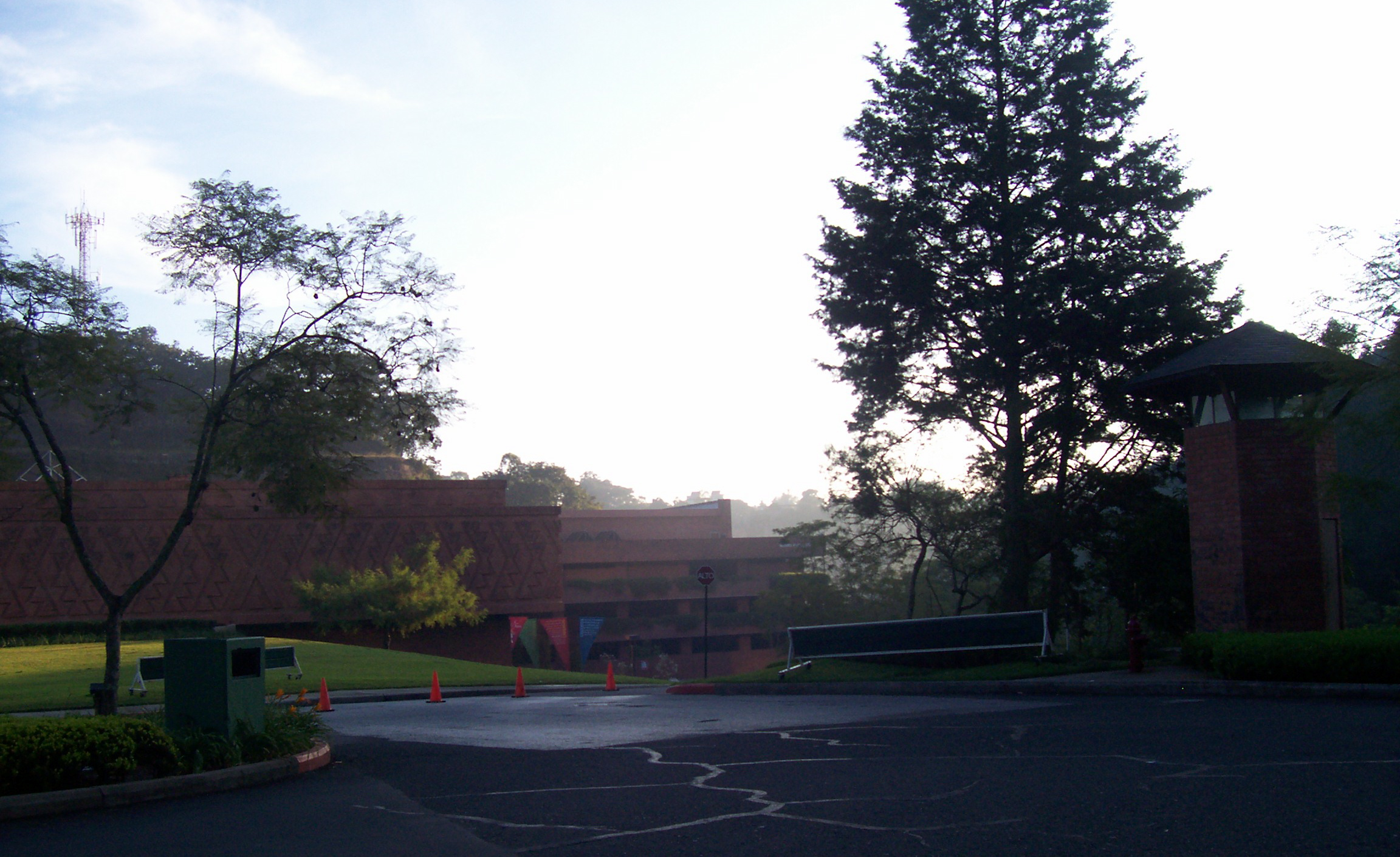

Francisco Marroquín University (Spanish: Universidad Francisco Marroquín), also known by the abbreviation UFM, is a private, secular university in Guatemala City, Guatemala. It describes its mission as "to teach and disseminate the ethical, legal, and economic principles of a society of free and responsible persons."

Founded by Manuel Ayau, in an attempt to counter what he perceived as "socialist" ideology at other universities in the country, Universidad Francisco Marroquín is a libertarian university, and Milton Friedman once called it "one of the leading universities in Latin America."

== History ==
It was founded in 1971 by Manuel Ayau, known as Muso. Its namesake is Francisco Marroquín, an early bishop of Guatemala, educator and defender of the rights of the indigenous people. Started by members of Center for Economic and Social Studies with $40,000 and 125 students, UFM counted 2700 students in 2023. The philosophy statement says that "universities need to place themselves beyond the conflicts of their time so that science and academic freedom – which humankind will need at all times – may be preserved."

On September 28, 2018, Universidad Francisco Marroquín opened a campus in Madrid and became the first Latin American university authorized to operate in Spain.

== Degrees ==
In Guatemala, as in most of the rest of Latin America, the educational system concentrates students in their academic or professional discipline from the time of admission. Following secondary school, students are admitted to a particular school or department and, beginning the first year, they follow a prescribed program leading to a degree.

=== Undergraduate ===
Licenciatura degree (Licentiate): in most of Latin America, the degree most commonly awarded to undergraduate students is the licenciatura. Traditionally, it includes several more academic credits than does a B.A. or a B.S.:

- Disciplines: architecture, business administration, clinical nutrition, economics, education, international relations, law, political studies, public accounting and auditing, psychology (clinical and industrial).
- M.D./D.D.S.: Students are admitted directly into medical and dental schools as high-school graduates. Then follows a three-year program of basic science studies after which students receive a B.S. degree. It is followed by four years of medical or three of dental studies and one year of internship for medical students. The, graduates receive an M.D.(doctor of medicine) or D.D.S. (doctor of dental surgery) degree. Dental graduates may pursue residency specialization into Oral & Maxillofacial Surgery (four years), Peridodontics (2–3 years), Endodontics (2–3 years), Orthodontics (2–3 years), etc.
- Associate degree: disciplines include art history and personnel administration.
- Profesorado degree: the profesorado is a specialized degree for secondary school teachers. In many cases, it is required for employment: disciplines include art history, computer studies, social sciences and language.

=== Graduate ===
Master's degree disciplines: business administration (MBA); virtual business administration (online MBA); real estate project management (MAPI); entrepreneurial economics; international political economy; international relations, finance and taxation (MFIN); management of human resources; social sciences. Master's degree in the following medical specialties: internal medicine, ophthalmology, pediatrics, radiology.

=== Doctoral degree ===
Doctoral degree disciplines: economics, law, social sciences.

== Areas of instruction ==
- Accounting
- Architecture
- Business administration
- Clinical nutrition
- Dentistry
- Economics
- Education
- International relations
- Law
- Medicine, including internal medicine; ophthalmology; pediatrics; and radiology
- Political studies
- Psychology
- Social sciences

== Departments and projects ==
The Ludwig von Mises Library hosts a collection of the private libraries focused on prominent intellectuals and collectors:

- José Cecilio del Valle, a founding father of Central American independence.
- Carlos Elmenhorst, collector of Central American books and maps.
- William Hutt, an English author and economist.
- Gordon Tullock, co-founder of the school of Public Choice
- Sir Alan Walters, an economic advisor to Margaret Thatcher.

At the beginning of the 2000s, the library started offering access to digital resources. It is subscribed to other services in this area including EBSCOHost databases, Oxford Scholarship Online, xRefer Plus and UpToDate, MDConsult and others.

The library was chosen among all the libraries around the World within the 10 libraries to receive the Elsevier donation of 670 titles. The library site received the Arroba de Oro award in Guatemala for the best educational website.

The Henry Hazlitt Center co-ordinates the courses of Ethics of Freedom, The Philosophy of Friedrich A Hayek, and Economic Process (I, II and III) that are offered to all undergraduate students in all schools. It also offers seminars and lectures for professors in order to improve their academic and pedagogic skills.

The Center for the Study of Capitalism was founded in 2009 with the support of the university as a private, secular, coeducational, nonresidential, nonprofit center of study. It organizes Socratic dialogue sessions with high school students and young entrepreneurs to study philosophical values. Since its foundation, more than 1000 participants have joined philosophical discussions.

The Arboretum aims to conserve plants and animals in the campus. The land of the university is a remnant of the Montano Forest of pine and Encino trees that used to cover Guatemala. The gardens have been designed to integrate native and exotic species. Since the beginning, preservation of the forest was a priority, to the point that the library's architectural design of the buildings was done to keep the trees as intact as possible. New Media Department – Creation, Implementation & Effective Management of Digital Resources – The New Media Department specializes in streaming audio and video conferences in English and Spanish on topics related to classical liberal thought.

Sampler:

- Milton and Rose Friedman's Free to Choose series (in Spanish)
- James Buchanan conference for the opening of Latin America's first Public Choice Center (2001)
- Vernon L. Smith honorary doctorate ceremony (2004)
- Interview of Milton and Rose Friedman for the 2002 Mont Pelerin Society General Meeting in London

The Museo Popol Vuh Museum offers its visitors a journey through Guatemalan history, illustrated by its collection of pre-Hispanic and colonial art. The museum is a scientific, private, nonprofit organization for the conservation, investigation and the popularization of Guatemala's cultural and archeological heritage.

Lienzo de Quauhquechollan is a large Nahua painting on cotton cloth (lienzo) that belongs to the pre-Hispanic tradition of documenting stories of migrations and conquests within a geographic context. Considered the first map of Guatemala, it is one of the few sources from the 16th century that tell of the military campaigns of Jorge de Alvarado in 1527. A digitally-restored copy and an animated recreation of the story, exhibited at the campus, are based on the research done by Dutch archaeologist Florine Asselbergs.

The ITA Scholarship Program (an acronym for Impulso al Talento Academico) stands for "promotion of academic talent." The program grants scholarships for undergraduate degrees to the poorest, most highly qualified and most motivated students. The scholarship covers full tuition and fees, room and board, medical insurance, and a stipend for public transportation, books, and basic personal expenses.

== Traditions and landmarks ==
Following Manuel Ayau, in 1972, the first class of students that entered to the university presented a pair of bronzed shoes to the founding rector, Ayau, as a joke. Since then the shoes are kept at the rector's office; as a way to remember to follow Ayau's steps and those of the founders of the university on the road to freedom.

Honoring the champions of freedom, it has awarded honoris causa doctorates to scientists, intellectuals, businessmen, artists and others who have contributed to the sciences, the arts, the world of business and the cause of freedom. Four Nobel Prize winners have accepted an honorary degree awarded by the university: Friedrich Hayek; Milton Friedman, James M. Buchanan, and Vernon L. Smith.

At the House of Freedom, the library is named after Ludwig von Mises; there are the Friedrich A. Hayek Auditorium and the Milton Friedman Auditorium. The department in charge of the courses of Social Philosophy and Economic Process is named after Henry Hazlitt. There is a Freedom Plaza and a terrace named after Rose Friedman.

Mises's birthday, September 29, is celebrated by Professor Joseph Keckeissen's students with a Viennese party by the second semester of every year. It includes theatrical presentations, singing and dancing. Keckeissen attended Mises's Seminar in New York City and he began the theatrical tradition in the 1980s with the Guttenberg Society.

Commencement ceremony – On May and November, UFM celebrates commencement ceremonies. During these the graduating students receive their titles and diplomas. On that occasion the Board of Directors award the honoris causa doctorates.

Honor graduates ceremony – The night before the commencement ceremony, at UFM, they celebrate a ceremony and a cocktail party in praise of those students which graduate with honors, and to celebrate excellence (in Spanish). The honors awarded are cum laude, for those who obtained grades between 85 and 90: magna cum laude, for those who obtained grades between 91 and 94; and summa cum laude, for those who accumulated an average between 95 and 100.

Inaugural Lesson – The Inaugural Lesson is an academic tradition at Universidad Francisco Marroquín where a local or visiting professor gives a lecture on philosophy. The first Inaugural Lesson, at UFM, was presented by vice-rector emeritus Rigoberto Juárez-Paz, and it was about Plato's Academy.

=== Landmarks on campus ===
Marroquín's bust, as the university is named after Bishop Marroquín, because he was the first prelate ordained in America in the colonial times. During his tenure as bishop, Marroquín took care of the rights of indigenous people and helped fund Colegio de Santo Tomás de Aquino (Saint Thomas Aquinas High School) the first university in Central America. The bust's sculptor is José Nicolás. However, the university is nondenominational.

Hayek's bust, as he was awarded the Nobel Memorial Prize in Economic Sciences in 1974. He visited 1977, when he was awarded an honoris causa doctorate in social sciences. The House of Freedom, the auditorium of the Academic Building, is named for Hayek. His bust is located at the Ludwig von Mises Library and was donated by Walter S. Morris, of Little Rock, Arkansas, in 1991.

Mises's bust, as he visited Guatemala when he was invited by the Centro de Estudios Económico-Sociales and supported for the foundation of the university. His bust was donated by the class of 1975 by the School of Business.

The Atlas Libertas is a bas relief placed on the main façade of the UFM Business School. A high-relief sculpture of a human figure supporting the universe seen from the back from head to hip. The universe is represented by a series of semicircles (abstract planets and gear mechanisms).

The Central Garden (renamed the Garden of Manuel Ayau) is modeled after a Greek amphitheater and hosts the commencement ceremonies. In 2011, after the death of founder Ayau, it was renamed to honor him.

== Journals ==
- Apuntes de Economía y Política (Public Choice Newsletter)
- Areté (Journal of the Department of Education)
- Arquitemas (Journal of the School of Architecture)
- Eleutheria (Philosophy Department)
- Laissez-Faire (Economics Journal)
- Revista de la Facultad de Derecho (Law Review)

== Recipients of honorary degrees who have been awarded Nobel Prizes ==
- James M. Buchanan, Nobel Prize in Economics
- Milton Friedman, Nobel Prize in Economics
- Friedrich Hayek, Nobel Prize in Economics
- Vernon L. Smith, Nobel Prize in Economics
- Mario Vargas Llosa, Nobel Prize in Literature

== See also ==
- List of universities in Guatemala
