= Canal 13 (Guatemalan TV channel) =

Canal 13 TGSS-TV
- Country: Guatemala
- Affiliates: Univision
- Headquarters: Guatemala City

Programming
- Language: Spanish
- Picture format: 1080i HDTV

Ownership
- Owner: Chapin TV (Albavisión)
- Sister channels: Canal 3 Canal 7 Canal 11; TN23

History
- Launched: 20 September 1978
- Former names: TeleTrece; Trecevisión

Links
- Website: www.chapintv.com

Availability

Terrestrial
- Analog VHF: Channel 13; Channel 2 (inside the country)

Canal 13, formerly known as TeleTrece and Trecevisión is a television station headquartered in Guatemala City, Guatemala, with repeaters throughout the country. The network and stations broadcast in the NTSC format.

It is one of the five stations operated by Radio y Televisión de Guatemala, who also operate channels 3, 7, 11 and 23, all of which are linked to Remigio Ángel González through his Albavisión group. The channel mostly airs animated series aimed at children in the daytime, as well as sporting events, TV shows and newscasts.

== History ==
The channel started operating as 13Visión on September 20, 1978, being founded by José Antonio Mourra. Mourra brought Guatemala to the pan-regional ATELCAP framework in the mid-1980s. In the 1980s and 90s, the channel's output was limited to foreign programming. It premiered its newscast, T13 Noticias, in 2007.
