= Televicentro (Honduras) =

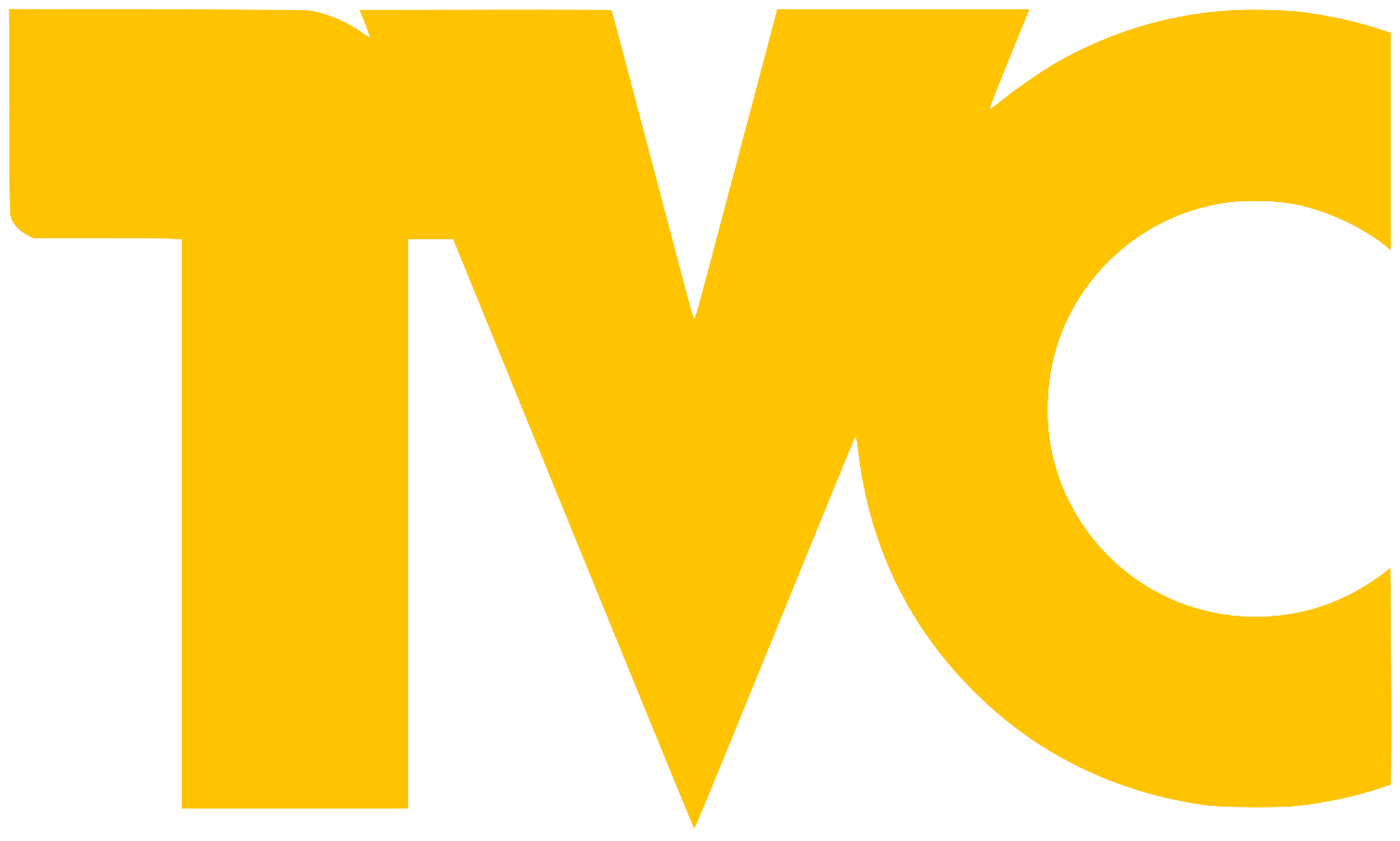
- Headquarters: Tegucigalpa, Honduras

Programming
- Picture format: 720p/1080i (HD)

Links
- Website: www.televicentro.com

Televicentro or TVC is a television corporation in Honduras, which as of 2004, is owned by Rafael Ferrari.

Televicentro was founded in 1987 with the aim of merging Canal 5, Canal 3/7 and Telecadena 7/4 under an umbrella organization, aiming at improving the coverage of the stations and creating new relayers for them. In 1993, the group installed new equipment – Betacam, Sony SP videotapes, Video Toaster, Topas and new title and effect generating machines.

== Operations ==
The company owns four terrestrial television networks (Canal 5, Telecadena 7y4, TSi, Mega Clásicos) and one subscription television network (Canal Deportes TVC).

=== Television ===
Logo	Name	Content	Launch	Channels	Former names
	Canal 5 El Líder	Main general programming network. It mainly broadcasts telenovelas, entertainment programs of both national and foreign production, game shows and newscasts. On weekends it broadcasts series, comedies, movies and special events.	September 15, 1959	Channel 5 (Tegucigalpa); Channel 9 (northern zone)	
	TSi; El orgullo de estar informado	News channel.	December 27, 1967	Channel 3 (Tegucigalpa); Channel 7 (San Pedro Sula)	Telesistema Hondureño (1967-2016)
	Telecadena; Va con toda la familia	Secondary generalist network. True part of the programming consists the contents from Univision.	July 29, 1985	Channel 7 Channel 4 (northern zone)	
	Mega	Generalist programming network. It broadcasts programming from Televicentro's media archive such as series, comedy, telenovelas and movies. As well as repeats of the original productions of Channel 5 and TSi.	July 20, 2007	Channel 24 (central zone); Channel 36 (northern zone)	Mega TV (2007-2017) Mega Show Business TV (2017-2018) Mega Clásicos (2018-2022)
	Canal Deportes TVC; El canal que tu pasión merece	Sports network. It broadcasts information and opinion programs with sports themes, as well as live and delayed broadcasts of Liga 5 Estrellas. It is only available on cable television.	November 1, 2023	Varies on provider	

=== Other media ===
Logo	Name	Founding	Type
	tunota	November 8, 2019	Press
	HRN Radio	1933	Radio station
