= National Centre Union =

National Centre Union Unión del Centro Nacional
- Founded: 14 June 1983
- Dissolved: 22 February 2000
- Ideology: Liberalism
- Political position: Centre to centre right
- Colors: Blue

National Centre Union (Spanish: Unión del Centro Nacional, UCN) was a political party in Guatemala founded in 1983, by Jorge Carpio Nicolle, Ramiro de León Carpio and Mario Taracena.

It was succeeded ideologically in 1995 by the Partido de Avanzada Nacional (PAN) and then in 2003 by the Gran Alianza Nacional (GANA).
