= Jorge Carpio Nicolle =

Guatemalan politician and newspaper publisher

- Born: 24 October 1932; Guatemala
- Died: 3 July 1993 (aged 60); Chichicastenango, Quiché Department, Guatemala
- Cause of death: Assassination by firearm
- Education: Universidad de San Carlos de Guatemala
- Political party: National Centre Union
- Spouse: Martha Arrivillaga de Carpio
- Children: 1
- Relatives: Roberto Carpio (brother); Ramiro de León Carpio (cousin)

Jorge Carpio Nicolle (24 October 1932 – 3 July 1993) was a Guatemalan politician, journalist and newspaper owner and publisher. In 1963, Carpio the foundered El Gráfico, at one time one of Guatemala's largest newspapers. Carpio served as Guatemala's Ambassador to the United Nations, and formed part of the commission on human rights. The founder of the National Centre Union in 1983, Carpio was assassinated by firearm on 3 July 1993.

== Early life and education ==
Carpio was born on 24 October 1932 in Guatemala to Roberto Carpio de la Cerda and María Luisa Nicolle. One of three siblings, Carpio was the brother of Roberto Carpio, a politician and Vice President of Guatemala from 1986 to 1991. Carpio was the cousin of the Ramiro de León Carpio, a politician, human rights procurator and President of Guatemala from 1993 to 1996.

Educated at the Universidad de San Carlos de Guatemala, Carpio graduated with a degree in political science.

== History ==
Jorge Carpio was the representation of Guatemala as a Delegate to the UN General Assembly, appointed by the Chancellor Emilio Arenales Catalan to represent Guatemala in the Third Committee of that organization in 1967. That year he wrote other covenants on Human Rights, Economic, Social and Cultural Rights and the Protocol on Civil and Political Rights. Jorge Carpio sponsored events and activities for the needy population of the country. He chaired the GRC and the Organization of Fire. Promoted the implementation of the Special Olympics for Handicapped Children and was driving several of the most important cycling laps had Guatemala.

== The Journalist ==
In 1960 founded "El Grafico Deportivo" and in 1961 the weekly news, ”El Grafico del Jueves ". In 1963 came "El Grafico", from which it is presented as a journalist and columnist for 30 years. As a journalist, was president of several national and regional organizations such as: Media Advertising Federation of Central America and Panama (FEMEPCAP) between 1974 and 1975, the Advertising Media Association of Guatemala (AMPG) between 1975–76 and 77; the Media Federation of Central America between 1979 and 1982, the Guatemalan Chamber of Journalism from 1980 to 1981 (he was appointed Honorary President), the Newspaper Association of America (JV) between 1982 and 1983. The Media Federation of Central America (FEMECA) 1982–83. During his presidency of the Media Federation of Central America and Panama, won the Gold Award Kin, for advertising campaigns "We are five people and one destiny" and "Let us live in peace, violence down," which were broadcast mass and simultaneously across all media in Central America.

== The Academic ==
As a professional in political science, Jorge Carpio conducted several analyses of national and international reality. Among a variety of topics and articles published in El Grafico or edited separately, are among these the thesis presented to the School of Political Science at the University of San Carlos to obtain the title of political scientist: "Political parties in Guatemala (1954 -1978) ", one of the first scientific studies on political parties in Guatemala. In the travel chronicle "The United States to the Economic Situation and Policy Updates" explores the economic, social and political U.S., based on a trip to that country invited by the State Department in 1973. His newspaper editorials showed their education. Prominent among these a series of articles on "The Social Structure of Guatemala", "Analysis of the Challenges of the Military Junta of Government", "Reflections on the Altiplano Indian Massacres", "Democratizing Decentralization Is" and "Press Freedom and Democracy. "

== The Politician ==
On July 14, 1983, founded the National Center Union party (UCN), which became Secretary General. Just seven months old, UCN participated in the 1984 elections to integrate the National Constituent Assembly that would draft the country's current constitution, achieving placed as one of the major parties in the country. Later, Jorge Carpio competed as a presidential candidate in the general election of 1985, reaching second place. Although in the second round was defeated, his party was established as the main opposition politics in the country. In 1990 he served as President of the Federation of Liberal and Centrist Parties in Central America and the Caribbean, as well as being Vice President of Liberal International. That same year, Jorge Carpio participated again as presidential candidate in the November general election, winning first place in the first round, but took second place in the second round. However, he continued his political activity nationally. In 1992 he published a proposal to improve the Guatemalan political system, called the "October Letter" which is a valuable tool for reflection on the possibilities of the country's political development.

As a national leader, Jorge Carpio played an important role in the return to democracy after the attempted coup of May 1993. On July 3 of that year, in an obscure incident, Jorge Carpio was killed along with Juan Vicente Villacorta Fajardo and two other members of UCN in the department of El Quiche, during a political tour of the west. His death led to the repudiation of Guatemalan society, who lost one of its best leaders.

== Assassination ==
He was assassinated on 3 July 1993, along with Juan Vicente Villacorta Fajardo who was a member of one of Guatemala's oldest and well known political families and two other political leaders of the UCN, in the municipality of Chichicastenango, El Quiché. Surviving witnesses reported that the murders took place after the group was intercepted by members of the Army Self Defense Patrols, a type of paramilitary unit under the control of the Guatemalan Army. According to his widow, Marta Arrivillaga de Carpio, who was with Carpio and the others during the attack, the party's minivan was stopped by a group of armed men in ski masks. The assailants said "You're Jorge Carpio" and then shot him three times. The other victims of the attack were Alejandro Ávila Guzmán, and Rigoberto Rivas González.

Shortly before Carpio's assassination, his first cousin, Ramiro de León Carpio, was appointed president after the failed auto-coup by Jorge Serrano Elías.

== Personal life ==
Carpio was married to Martha Arrivillaga de Carpio, with whom he one son.
