= Canal 7 (Guatemalan TV channel) =

Guatemalan television network

Canal 7 TGVG-TV
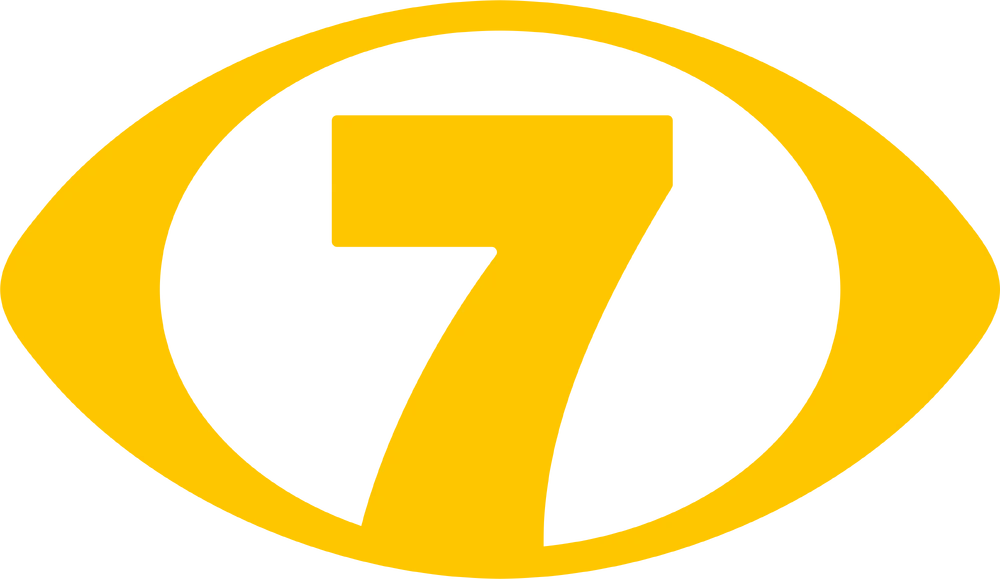
- Country: Guatemala

Programming
- Picture format: 1080i HDTV

Ownership
- Owner: Chapín TV (Albavisión)
- Sister channels: Canal 3 Canal 11; Canal 13; TN23

History
- Launched: December 15, 1964

Links
- Website: chapintv.com

Availability

Terrestrial
- Analog VHF: Channel 7 Channel 8 (inside the country)
- Digital UHF: Channel 19.2; Channel 43.1

Canal 7 (Canal Siete, formerly Televicentro and Televisiete) is a Guatemalan terrestrial television channel owned by Grupo Chapín TV, a subsidiary of Remigio Ángel González's Albavisión group. Similar to sister channel Canal 3, the channel has a generalist profile and also airs programming from Univision.

== History ==
Televicentro launched on December 15, 1964 under the TGBO-TV calls, with a daily schedule between 5pm and 11pm. The station was founded by the El Imparcial newspaper, with initial funding costing 250,000 quetzales and with video taping equipment worth 80,000 quetzales. At launch, the channel covered 80% of the Guatemalan territory. On December 5, 1965, the channel faced internal problems among shareholders, with José Quiñones as interventor.

One of its initial successes was its sports telecasts, especially of the Guatemalan soccer league, however the bulk of its programming consisted in movies and television series produced in both Mexico and the United States, much like what happened with Canal 3. The hiring of foreign experts at the station and the installation of repeaters in the Guatemalan interior regions led to an increase in ratings but a stiff competition with Canal 3.

Around 1977, the channel was renamed Televisiete, changed their callsigns to TGVG-TV, likely due to its relations with Televisa.

The station is acquired by Alba Lorenzana Cardona, wife of Remigio Ángel González, in 1980. Televisiete's parent company Televisiete S.A. controls Indetel S.A. in Ecuador, which runs La Tele. With the appearance of González and Cardona, the station specialized more in relaying Mexican programming. In 1987, the station launched the Notisiete newscast.
