= Remigio Ángel González =

Mexican media mogul

- Born: June 14, 1944 (age 82); Higueras, Nuevo León, Mexico
- Occupations: Businessman, entrepreneur
- Spouse: Alba Elvira Lorenzana
- Children: 1

Remigio Ángel González (born June 14, 1944) is a Mexican-born owner of the Latin American media network Albavisión. He has lived in Miami since 1987. The network (previously named Televideo Services) is named for his wife Alba Elvira Lorenzana, who is from Guatemala. González was estimated to be worth $350m in 2002, and by some accounts is now worth $2bn. González has a conservative political stance, but he aims to keep a low profile and cooperate with host country governments. As part of this strategy, he is said to have modified the editorial lines of his stations, particularly in Guatemala and Nicaragua, to accommodate government preferences.

== Albavisión ==
Current logo of the conglomerate

The foundation for the Albavisión network, created in May 2008, was laid in 1981 when González acquired his two Guatemalan television stations (Canal 3 and 7). At the time, González was a sales representative for Mexico's Televisa, selling its programming in Central America, and used Televisa's loan backing to acquire the station. In the mid-1990s, he acquired Guatemala's Canal 13, and completed a "virtual monopoly control of that nation's commercial television airwaves".

In January 2010, the Albavision network had 26 television stations (including La Red (Chile), ATV (Peru), SNT (Paraguay) and Canal 9 (Argentina) and 82 radio stations. Many Latin American countries have laws restricting foreign ownership, and as a result the network has a range of "phantom companies run by local relatives, friends and stand-ins"; his Guatemalan properties are in his (Guatemalan) wife's name.

Through Albavision, González controls four television stations in Guatemala—El Super Canal, Televisiete, Teleonce and Trecevisión—attaining a monopoly of commercial television channels inside the country. He also controls three of Nicaragua's nine television stations (Channels 10 and 4 (until 2018)). As of May 2018, all the stations González owns, operates or advises in Nicaragua have sons and daughters of Nicaraguan President Daniel Ortega, an associate of González, running them. González also owns three stations in Costa Rica, as well as five in the south of his native México, operating as Canal 13.

A 2001 study of González's media properties in Guatemala and Nicaragua found that they had a tendency to squeeze out voices opposed to the government, and concluded that "Gonzalez’s ownership practices create an atmosphere that undercuts the development of democracy." He has a strong influence in Guatemalan politics, for example giving $650,000 to Vinicio Cerezo's 1985 presidential campaign, as well as more than $2.6 million and free airtime to Alfonso Portillo's 1999 campaign. "Political analysts say the free commercials helped Portillo win the election." After becoming president, Portillo "named Gonzalez's brother-in-law, Luis Rabbé, as his minister of communications, infrastructure and housing, a powerful Cabinet position whose jurisdiction includes the oversight of broadcast media."

Until the creation of the name Albavisión, González used the name Televideo Services.

As of August 2018, Gonzalez owned 35 television channels, 114 radio stations and two newspaper companies in 11 Latin American countries.

== Personal life ==
He is better known as "the Ghost" (el Fantasma) because he deliberately avoids appearing in public. Because of this, only a few photographs of him exist.

His second wife, Alba Elvira Lorenzana, is the largest shareholder of Radio y Televisión de Guatemala, S.A. and Televisiete S.A.; their daughter Jani González Lorenzana (born 1973) is a psychologist by profession, and is the main shareholder of Interacel Argentina as well as holding shares on Televisiete.

González is seen as a gourmet eater, but prefers to eat in low-profile restaurants in Coral Gables, Florida, in order to evade encounters with his questionable invitees. His lunches, often with political figures, are crucial for the political alignment of his stations in the countries where they operate, and often last from 12pm to 5pm.
