= Canal 3 (Guatemalan TV channel) =

Guatemalan television network

Canal 3 TGV-TV
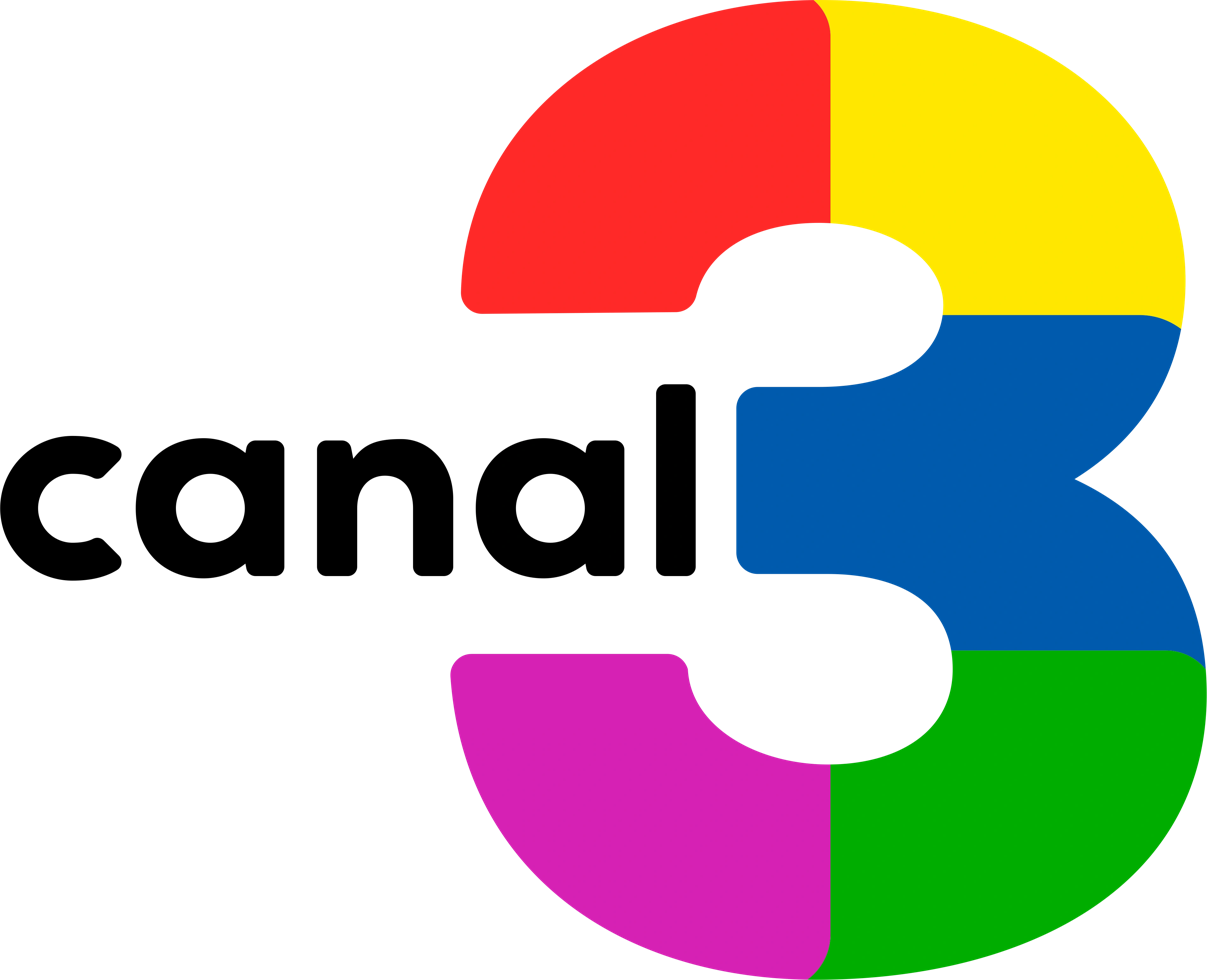
- Country: Guatemala

Programming
- Picture format: 1080i HDTV

Ownership
- Owner: Chapín TV
- Sister channels: Canal 7 Canal 11; Canal 13; TN23

History
- Launched: May 15, 1956

Links
- Website: chapintv.com

Availability

Terrestrial
- Analog VHF: Channel 3 Channel 10 (inside the country) (UHF 43 repeater)
- Digital UHF: Channel 19.2; Channel 43.1

Canal 3 is a Guatemalan television station, that was the first commercial TV station and the second overall station in Guatemala. It began its TV service in 1956.

Its programming broadcasts its own productions and telenovelas, among other international productions. It is owned by Grupo Chapín TV, a subsidiary of Remigio Ángel González's Albavisión group.

== History ==
On May 15, 1956, Channel 3 began broadcasting and became the first private station in Central America, using the TGBOL calls (later changed to TGV-TV). Its first studio was located in the 8th. avenue and 9th. Zone 1 street, and its antenna was located in the city center. In 1961 the studio was destroyed after a fire, forcing the channel to be off the air for a few months. Later, it moved its facilities to a location in Las Majadas, zone 11.

The channel is considered pioneer of television, as it was the first to make live broadcasts from mobile units and in color broadcasting. It was the fourth country in Latin America to do so, after Mexico, Cuba and Puerto Rico. Its signal was available in a handful of districts around Guatemala City and within the first six months on air, it premiered its first newscast, Cuestión de Minutos, whose name was adapted from a Mexican newscast.

In 1962, the channel started broadcasting from the Alux range, improving its reception, especially in the capital, allowing it to have national coverage.

In 1968, the Canal 3 facility was looted. On February 4, 1976, it suffered material losses from a 7.5 magnitude earthquake.

In the 1980s, it incorporated stereo sound, but in 1982 the government of Efrain Rios Montt gave the order to close the channel for about a month. In 1988, Canal 3 and Televisiete were sold to Remigio Ángel González.

In 1990, it began broadcasting 24 hours a day.

In 1992, both channels were sold to Miami-based television corporation Albavisión.

The station made its first broadcasts in high definition during the 2006 FIFA World Cup held in Germany experimentally on digital UHF channel 19.

In 2015, the Grupo Chapín TV group was created, along with its sister channels. Canal 3 had a predominantly foreign output.

== Controversies ==
On June 2, 2016, the International Commission Against Impunity in Guatemala and Public Prosecutor's Office announced the State Cooperation Case in Guatemala State Co-optation. According to the investigations, in 2008, Otto Pérez Molina, general secretary of the Patriotic Party, was shaping up as the presidential candidate. Because his party needed funds, a group of companies controlled by Roxana Baldetti was used to receive illicit money, including Comercial Urma, Publicmer, Publiases and Serpumer. These entities began receiving money from Guatemala Radio and Television and Televisiete.

As the campaign progressed, channels increased payments to the four companies to the sum of Q17 679 200.00. Monthly, two payments were recorded for Q215 600.00, one for each channel. Both television stations benefited from million-dollar contracts after the new government took office in 2012.

Payments were not reported to the Supreme Electoral Court and were used to purchase new vehicles: ten trucks, one bus and five vans, which were used in the Patriot Party's presidential campaign.
