= List of television stations in Latin America and the Caribbean =

This is a list of television stations throughout Latin America and the Caribbean regions.

== Caribbean ==
=== Anguilla ===
- ZJF-TV 3 (Anguilla TV) Anguilla
- Caribbean Gospel TV (CGTV) Digicel Ch.560

=== Antigua and Barbuda ===
- V2C-TV 10 (formerly ZAL-TV)(ABS-TV/Radio) – Antigua and Barbuda

=== Aruba ===
- ATV 8/15 (Aruba Broadcasting Company/NBC) – Oranjestad, Aruba
- Telearuba 13/23/313 (SETAR) – Pos Chikito, Aruba / Oranjestad, Aruba
- Canal 22 – Sta Cruz, Aruba / Oranjestad, Aruba
- ArubaTV Plus on Roku TV & ViewSat DvB S2 - Oranjestad, Aruba

=== Bahamas ===
- ZNS-TV 13 (Channel 13) – Nassau, Bahamas / Freeport, Bahamas
- JCN Channel 14
- NB12
- BCN
- Bahamas Real Estate Channel
- Parliament 40
- BTC TV
- ILTV Studios

=== Barbados ===
- 8PX-TV 8 (Caribbean Broadcasting Corporation) – Bridgetown, Barbados

==== Future ====
- Public Broadcast Service

==== Cable-only ====
- Caribbean Cooking Channel
- CaribVision
- Discover Barbados TV
- Multi-Choice TV
- Caribbean Gospel TV (CGTV) Digicel Ch.27

=== Bermuda ===
- Bermuda Broadcasting Company
  - ZFB-TV (ABC) 7 – Hamilton, Bermuda
  - ZBM-TV (CBS) 9 – Hamilton

=== Bonaire ===
- PJB-TV 6 (Tele Curaçao, Bonaire/Saba)
- PJC-TV 8 (Tele Curaçao, Curaçao)
- Bonaire.tv (Telbo ch. 70, Flamingo TV ch. 23)
- Energia TV (formerly Dutch Caribbean TV)
- NosTV Bonaire

=== British Virgin Islands ===
- See Television stations in Road Town

Caribbean Gospel TV (CGTV) Digicel+

=== Cayman Islands ===
- Cayman27 / CITN
- Compass TV

==== Cable-only ====
- Discover Cayman TV
- Cayman Real Estate Channel
- Island 24 (I24) – Cayman Islands
- Caribbean Gospel TV ( Logic Cable Ch. 48)

=== Curaçao ===
- Televishon Direct kanal 13 (TV Direct 13), Curaçao
- PJC-TV 8 (Tele Curaçao, Curaçao)
- Nos Pais Television, Curaçao
- Caribbean Gospel TV (CGTV) Digicel Ch.83

=== Dominica ===
- No domestic terrestrial television stations; Marpin Telecoms and SAT Telecommunications Ltd, Dominica's cable TV operators both offer locally produced programming, plus channels in NTSC from the US, Latin America and the Caribbean, as well as Guadeloupe and Martinique (converted from SECAM). SAT Telecommunications Ltd delivers its offering via digital cable with the use of set top boxes whereas Marpin still uses traditional analogue.
- Caribbean Gospel TV (CGTV) Digicel Ch.560
- Marpin 2K4 Ltd.

=== Dominican Republic ===
- HIN-TV/Antena Latina
- Antena 21
- HISD-TV/RTVD 4 (Canal 4)
- HIMQ-TVColor Visión (Canal 9)
- HIJB-TV/Tele Antillas Canal 10
- HITM-TV/Telemicro Canal 5/Digital 15
- HITD-TV/Telesistema 11

See also Template:Dominican Republic TV

=== Grenada ===
- Grenada Broadcasting Network –
- Meaningful Television MTV 9 and 10 – Grenada

WPG 10 TV

==== Cable-only ====
- Gayelle TV (cable) – Trinidad and Tobago
- Caribbean Gospel TV (CGTV) Greendot Ch.14

=== Guadeloupe ===
Note: All transmissions in Guadeloupe are in digital terrestrial television

Local channels

- Channel 1, Guadeloupe La 1ère
- Channel 4, France 2
- Channel 5, France 3
- Channel 6, France 4
- Channel 7, France 5
- Channel 9, ARTE
- Channel 10, franceinfo
- Channel 11, Éclair Télévision (ETV)
- Channel 12, Alizés Guadeloupe

==== Cable TV ====
On cable TV (SFR Caraïbe), the local channels are:

- Alizés Guadeloupe
- Canal 10
- Éclair Télévision
- FUSION TV
- Guadeloupe La 1ère

=== Haiti ===
Port-au-Prince

- Canal 11 Canal 11
- Canal 13 Télé Timoun/
- Canal 18 Radio Télé Ginen
- Canal 24 Tele Lumiere
- Canal 30 Tele Variete Haiti

Other areas in Haiti
- Canal 4 TNH
- Canal 7 Tele Yaguana - Leogane
- Canal 15 Saint-Marc
- Canal 28 Tele La Brise, Camp-Perrin

=== Jamaica ===
==== Kingston ====
Ination TV

- Love TV Channel 6, Kingston, Jamaica / Saint Andrew Parish, Jamaica
- TVJ ZQI-TV Channel 11, Kingston, Jamaica
- Love TV Channel 17, Kingston, Jamaica / Saint Andrew Parish, Jamaica
- CETv! The Family Network (Cable)
- CVM TV Channel 9, Kingston, Jamaica / Saint Andrew Parish, Jamaica
- Hype TV (cable & DirecTV)
- RE TV (cable only)
- Mercy and Truth Ministries Television channel 671, channel 94 and channel 745 (MTM TV), Kingston, Jamaica
- Caribbean Gospel TV (Digicel Ch. 27)
- SportsMax (cable only), Kingston, Jamaica
- TVJ SPORTS NETWORK (cable only)

==== Manchester ====
- JUICE TV (Cable only) Mandeville, Jamaica

==== Montego Bay ====
- Love TV; Channel 2 - Montego Bay
- Eplus TV; Cornwall Communications Ltd.
- ZQI-TV; Channel 9, Montego Bay / Flower Hill, Jamaica
- CVM TV; Channel 11 Montego Bay, Jamaica / Flower Hill, Jamaica
- Mercy and Truth Ministries Television (MTM TV) Channel 671
- Caribbean Gospel TV (CGTV) ( Digicel Ch. 27)

==== Ocho Rios (Lillyfield) ====
- Love TV Channel 3 Ocho Rios, Jamaica (Lillyfield)
- CVM TV Channel 10 Ocho Rios, Jamaica (Lillyfield)
- Mercy and Truth Ministries Television (MTM TV) channel 68

==== Port Antonio ====
- ZQI-TV; Channel 8, Port Antonio
- CVM TV; Channel 13, Port Antonio

==== Coopers Hill ====
- ZQI-TV; Channel 7, Coopers Hill, Jamaica
- CVM TV; Channel 9, Coopers Hill, Jamaica

==== Other areas of Jamaica ====
- TVJ Channel 9, Yallahs, Jamaica
- TVJ Channel 10
- TVJ Channel 12, Oracabessa, Jamaica
- TVJ Channel 10, Morant Bay, St. Thomas
- CVM TV Channel 12, Morant Bay, St. Thomas
- MTM TV channel 69 (St. Ann) Channel 671 FLOW islandwide
- Caribbean Gospel TV ( Digicel Ch. 27)

==== Cable-only ====
- Hype TV – Premiere Caribbean Entertainment TV Station based in Kingston
- Logic One Limited – Digital Picture Perfect Cable TV
- Eplus TV- FLOW Channel 391 403 on the HD box, With over 1.3 million views monthly, HD ready Most interactive channel on cable.
- RE TV – Music and Entertainment from Jamaica
- TVJ SPORTS NETWORK – Airs regional sports based in Kingston
- CVM PLUS – Airs regional sports based in Kingston
- CaribV TV – Caribbean Family Entertainment
- CTV – The #1 Station for Arts and Culture in Jamaica
- SportsMax – The Caribbean's first and only 24-hour sports cable channel, based in Kingston, Jamaica, distributing its signal to 23 other territories in the Caribbean.
- FLOW Sports is the Caribbean's second 24- hour sports cable channel which is being aired in several Caribbean countries and Panama.

FLOW Sports is the only regional channel that broadcast in full High Definition (HD) from a state of the art broadcasting studio located in Trinidad.

- JET – Jamaica Education TV
- FLOW TV Michele English, president and chief operating officer of Flow in Jamaica, put the local content drive in the context of the company's development. She said that when Flow started its service in Jamaica five years ago, "we made a promise that we would continuously innovate". And English welcomed all to the relaunch of the revamped Flow TV. She made it clear that "we do not have any intention of becoming a broadcaster", while welcoming programmes in business, education, lifestyle, and those targeting children. English positioned Flow TV as "an affordable option for local producers", thereby providing them an opportunity to earn extra income. Michael Look Tong, head of media services, gave an even wider perspective on Flow TV's local content initiative, saying that Flow is moving towards being a user-generated channel with new and interesting content.

Flow which was once owned by Columbus Communications is currently owned by Cable and Wireless Plc (CWC). However, in November 2015, the board of CWC approved the sale of CWC to Liberty Global who had made an offer.

- JUICE TV Jamaica -Cultural, Entertainment and Music TV Station based in Mandeville, Jamaica
- Caribbean Gospel TV - Caribbean Gospel TV (CGTV) is a 24/7 faith and family-based television network that features programs for the Caribbean communities and diaspora.

=== Martinique ===
Note: All transmissions in Martinique are in digital terrestrial television

Local channels

- Channel 1, Martinique La 1ère
- Channel 2, viàATV (Some of TF1 and M6 programmes)
- Channel 4, France 2
- Channel 5, France 3
- Channel 6, France 4
- Channel 7, France 5
- Channel 9, ARTE
- Channel 10, franceinfo
- Channel 11, Zitata TV

==== Cable TV ====
On cable TV (SFR Caraïbe), the local channels are:

- Annonces TV
- APTV (live internet)
- FUSION TV
- Graphé TV
- KMT
- LCC
- Martinique La 1ère
- TV Famille
- viàATV
- Zouk TV

=== Montserrat ===
- People's Television, Manjack, Montserrat [Free to Air]
- ZTV, Sweeney's Montserrat [Cable]

=== Saba ===
- PJB-TV 6 (Tele Curaçao, Bonaire/Saba)
- PJS-TV 6 (LBC, Saba)
- RCTV 10

=== Saint Barthélemy ===
Note: All transmissions in Saint Barthélemy are in digital terrestrial television

Local channels

- Channel 1, Guadeloupe La 1ère
- Channel 3, France 2
- Channel 4, France 3
- Channel 5, France 4
- Channel 6, France 5
- Channel 8, ARTE
- Channel 9, franceinfo
- FUSION TV

=== Saint Kitts and Nevis ===
- ZIZ-TV 2 and 5, Basseterre, Saint Kitts and Nevis
- Caribbean Gospel TV (CGTV) Digicel Ch. 502

=== Saint Lucia ===
- Daher Broadcasting Service (DBS) Channel 10 (Cable Channel 35), Castries, Saint Lucia
- National Television Network (NTN 2) – Saint Lucia
- VQH-TV 4 and 5 (Helen Television System Channel 4,(Cable: Channel 34) Castries, Saint Lucia
- EWTN Channel 6, Castries, Saint Lucia
- GVD Caribbean 115 Flow Sarrot Bexon St Lucia
- Hot 7 TV (Internet, Cable, Mobile Device, Castries, Saint Lucia
- SHINE TV – Channel 49 LIME, Channel 53 Karib Cable, [Castries, Saint Lucia]
- The Visitor Channel 40 LIME & 51 FLOW,

=== Saint Martin/Sint Maarten ===
- TV 15 on St.Maarten Cable TV
- Guadeloupe La Première
- TVCARiB on WTN, TELTV+, MSR Cable Fr. St. Martin
- FUSION TV
- Caribbean Gospel TV (CGTV) (TELTV+)

=== Saint Vincent and the Grenadines ===
  - ZBG-TV Channel 9, with repeaters on 7, 10, 11, 13, 14, (CBS / CNN / Caribbean Media Corporation), Kingstown, Saint Vincent and the Grenadines
- TBN Channel 4, Kingstown, Saint Vincent and the Grenadines

=== Trinidad and Tobago ===
See: List of television stations in Trinidad and Tobago, and Template:Trinidad-Tobago-TV

=== United States Virgin Islands ===
- See Television Stations in Saint Croix/Charlotte Amalie
- Caribbean Gospel TV (CGTV) (One TV+ Ch. 333 )

=== Regional cable stations ===
- Multi-Choice TV
- Nexus – The Caribbean Connection to the World...
- Hype TV – Premiere Caribbean Entertainment TV Station based in Kingston, Jamaica
- Tempo TV – A Caribbean-centric cable television channel
- CaribVision – A Caribbean-centric cable television channel by the Caribbean Media Corporation.
- Gayelle TV – Trinidad and Tobago
- Caribbean Faith Network
- WSEE-TV – the CBS affiliate station in Erie, Pennsylvania, which airs a broadcast feed on cable and satellite for Caribbean viewers (with localized weather forecasts, commercials and infomercials in place of its local newscasts), as part of the Primetime 24 group of channels.
- FLOW Sports – Regionwide cable station run by FLOW broadcasting sports content 24/7 in Full HD.
- Caribbean Gospel TV (CGTV)

== Central America ==
=== Belize ===
==== National ====
- Channel 5 – Belize City-based
- Channel 7 – Belize City-based

==== Cable-only ====
- The National Channel (TNC10) – Red Creek Village-based
- Belize Broadcasting Network (BBN9) – Belize City-based
- Channel 3 (CTV3) – Orange Walk-based
- XTV Belize – Belize City-based
- Love Television – Belize City-based
- Open Learning Television (OLTV) – Belize City-based
- Plus TV – Belmopan-based

=== Costa Rica ===
- Template:San Jose TV
- TI-TNS-TV: CDR Canal 2
- TI-IVS-TV: Repretel 4
- TI-TV6-TV: Repretel 6
- TI-TSR-TV: Teletica Canal 7
- TI-DE-TV: Canal 9 teve
- TI-TEC-TV: Sinart 10 (TI-SRN-TV translator)
- TI-BYK-TV: Repretel 11
- TI-SRN-TV: Sinart Canal 13
- TI------: TV Sur Canal 14 (Zona Sur)
- TI-UCR-TV: UCR Canal 15
- TI------: Canal 29 VM Latino
- TI------: Teletica Canal 33
- TI------: Anexion TV Canal 36 (Guanacaste y Limón)
- TI------: Extra TV Canal 42
- TI------: Telecable Canal 12 (Cable)

=== El Salvador ===
- YSR 2: Canal Dos - Telecorporación Salvadoreña
- YSU 4: Canal Cuatro - Telecorporación Salvadoreña
- YSLA 6: Canal Seis - Telecorporación Salvadoreña
- YSWE 8: Canal Ocho
- YSAL 9: - Legislative Assembly Channel
- YSTVE 10: Canal Diez - Televisión de El Salvador
- YSXU 19: Canal Diecinueve - (Thematic channel)
- YSTP 33: Canal Treinta y Tres - Francisco Gavidia University
- YSMH 65: (CJC 65)

=== Guatemala ===
- TGV-TV: 3 (Guatemala City)| 10: Canal 3 - El Súper Canal (Televisión Guatemalteca - Albavisión)
- TGCE-TV: 5 (Guatemala City) | 12: TV Maya (Academy of Mayan Languages of Guatemala); formerly known as Cultural and Educational TV (military channel)
- TGVG-TV: 7 (Guatemala City)| 8: Televisiete (Televisión Guatemalteca - Albavisión)
- TGW-TV: 8 (Guatemala): Televisión Nacional (first television channel in the country, already disappeared) (Channel State)
- TGCC-TV: 9 (Guatemala City)| 4: Congress Channel -Outside Air-
- TGMO-TV: 11 (Guatemala City)| 6: TeleOnce (Televisión Guatemalteca - state-operated)
- TGSS-TV: 13 (Guatemala City)| 2: Trecevisión (Televisión Guatemalteca - state-operated)
- Canal 19 (Guatemala City): Sonora TV (Radio Sonora - Albavisión)
- Canal 21 (Guatemala City): Enlace-TBN
- Canal 22 (San Marcos)
- Canal 22 (Escuintla) TV Azteca Guatemala
- Canal 23 (Guatemala City): Todonoticias (Albavisión)
- Canal 25 (Guatemala City): Guatevision "Un canal como debe ser"
- Canal 27 (Guatemala City)| 28 and 66: El Canal de la Esperanza (Christian Ministry Grounds)
- Canal 29 (Guatemala City): Grupo Nuevo Mundo
- Canal 31 (Guatemala City): TV Azteca; formerly known as Latitud Televisión
- Canal 33 (Guatemala City): TV-USAC
- Canal 35 (Guatemala City): TV Azteca
- Canal 40 (Petén): Corporación de Radio y Televisión Petenera, S. A.
- Canal 41 (Guatemala City): International Channel Telecentro
- Canal 43 (Guatemala City): International Channel Telecentro
- Canal 45 (Guatemala City): Jesus TV (Catholic channel)
- Canal 58 (Suchitepequez) : Mazatevision
- Canal 61 (Guatemala City): Enlace Juvenil
- Canal 63 (Guatemala City): Channel Archdiocese of Guatemala
- Canal 65 (Guatemala City): Family TV; formerly known as EWTN and TV Light (Catholic channel) -Outside Air-

==== Cable or satellite channels ====
- Canal de Gobierno (television Gubernamental Organismo Ejecutivo)
- Guatevision "Un canal como debe ser"
- Canal Antigua: "Mira sin límites"
- NTV (Nacional Tele Vision): "Lo que nadie se atreve a mostrar"
- 18-50 Televisión: "Diferente"
- VEA Canal:"Vida, Ecología y Ambiente"
- Expresion TV : "Un canal con actitud"
- Región + (Quetzaltenango)
- Huehuevision: "El Canal de los Huehuetecos"

=== Honduras ===
- HRJS-TV 2: Vica Television
- HRXN-TV 2: Tele Ceiba
- HRCV-TV 3/7: Telesistema 3/7 -
- HRTG-TV 5: Canal5 - El Lider
- HRJG-TV 6: Canal 6
- Canal 8 Honduras
- HRTS-TV 7:
- HRJS-TV 9: Vica Television
- Canal 11
- JBN
- Maya TV

=== Nicaragua ===
- Template:Nicaragua TV
- YNTC-TV 2: Televicentro Canal 2
- YNTM-TV 4: Canal 4
- YNSA-TV 6: Canal 6
- YN??-TV 8: Telenica Canal 8
- YNSA-TV 9: Canal 9
- YN??-TV 10: Canal 10
- YN??-TV 11: TV RED
- YNLG-TV 12: Canal 12 Nicavisión
- YNSA-TV 13: Viva Nicaragua 13
- YN??-TV 14: Vos TV
- YN??-TV 17: Magic Channel
- YN??-TV 21: Enlace Nicaragua
- YN??-TV 23: CDNN 23
- YN??-TV 35: Telenorte Canal 35
- Canal 15 (100% Noticias)
- Atv98
- SSTV (defunct; 1979–1990)
- SNTV (defunct; 1990–1997)

=== Panama ===
- Template:Panama TV
- RPC TV Canal 4
- TVN Canal 2
- Telemetro Canal 13
- FETV Canal 5
- SERTV Canal 11
- TVMax Canal 9
- NexTV Canal 21
- OYE TV Canal 7
- +23 Canal 23 (Panama's first music station)
- Enlace Canal 29
- NexTV Canal 33 (temp. mirroring signal from +23)
- Plus Canal 35
- Hosana Visión Canal 37
- ACP (Canal TV) Canal 25 (water level radar)

==== Defunct stations ====
- Panavision Canal 5
- Telecinco Canal 5
- SCN Channel 8
- Tele7 Canal 7
- Grupo Mix Holding: RCM Canal 21, Mix TV Canal 33
- Riande Productions: TVO Canal 21, ShopTv Canal 33
- Cadena Millenium: RCM Canal 21, RCM Mundo Canal 33, RCM Plus Canal 35
- QEXTV La Exitosa Canal 27 (signal test)

== Mexico ==
- Television stations in Aguascalientes
- Television stations in Baja California
- Television stations in Baja California Sur
- Television stations in Campeche
- Television stations in Chiapas
- Television stations in Chihuahua
- Television stations in Coahuila
- Television stations in Colima
- Television stations in Mexico City
- Television stations in Durango
- Television stations in Guanajuato
- Television stations in Guerrero
- Television stations in Hidalgo
- Television stations in Jalisco
- Television stations in the State of Mexico
- Television stations in Michoacán
- Television stations in Morelos
- Television stations in Nayarit
- Television stations in Nuevo León
- Television stations in Oaxaca
- Television stations in Puebla
- Television stations in Querétaro
- Television stations in Quintana Roo
- Television stations in San Luis Potosí
- Television stations in Sinaloa
- Television stations in Sonora
- Television stations in Tabasco
- Television stations in Tamaulipas
- Television stations in Tlaxcala
- Television stations in Veracruz
- Television stations in Yucatán
- Television stations in Zacatecas

== South America ==
=== Argentina ===
- América (Canal 2)
- América 24
- Argentina/12
- C5N
- Canal 13 (Argentina) (Arte Radiotelevisivo Argentino- Canal 13)
- Canal 26
- TV Publica
- Canal 9
- Crónica TV
- América 24
- Europa Europa
- Ciudad Magazine
- Pakapaka
- Telefe
  - Telefe International
- TN (Todo Noticias)
- TyC Max (Torneos y Competencias)
- TyC Sports (Torneos y Competencias)
- TyC Sports Internacional

=== Bolivia ===
- Bolivisión (Canal 4)
- Cadena A
- PAT
- Red ATB
- Red Uno de Bolivia
- RTP
- Televisión Nacional de Bolivia
- Unitel Bolivia

=== Colombia ===
- Canal 13 (formerly known as TV Andina)
- Canal Capital
- Canal Institucional
- Canal TRO
- Canal Uno
- Caracol TV
  - Caracol TV Internacional
- City TV Colombia
- Canal RCN (Radio Cadena Nacional)
  - RCN Nuestra Tele Internacional
  - Nuestra Tele Noticias 24 Horas
- Señal Colombia
- Teleamiga
- Teleantioquia
- Telecafé
- Telecaribe
- Telepacífico

=== Ecuador ===
- Ecuavisa
- TC Television
- Teleamazonas

=== French Guiana ===
- Guyane La Première

=== Guyana ===
Note: All transmissions in Guyana are in NTSC and ATSC 1.0

==== Georgetown ====
Analog stations:

- Godfrey Washington Television (GWTV) (formerly Safe TV) | VHF 2
- Ignite Television | VHF 6 | ENet TV CH 6
- GUY TV 9 | VHF 9
- Guyana Learning Channel| UHF 24 - Benab | UHF 29/80 - Georgetown | ENet TV CH 9 | Atlantic Cable TV Network CH 8
- NCN HD (NCN Guyana) | VHF 11
- Rambarran Broadcasting Systems (RBS) | VHF 13
- Multi Technology Vision (MTV) | UHF 14/65
- HGPTV | UHF 16/67 | Northwest TV
- National Television Network (NTN) | UHF 18/69 | ENet TV CH 5
- Hits and Jams Television (HJTV/STVS Channel) | UHF 21/72 | ENet TV CH 20
- First Light Television | UHF 23/74
- CGTN (TV channel) | UHF 27/78
- TVG | UHF 28
- Good News TV | UHF 31/82
- MBC TV | VHF 42/93

Digital stations:

- NCN HD | DTV CH 1-2 | ENet TV CH 4
- NCN Sports | DTV CH 1–3
- GLC Elementary | DTV CH 24-32 | ENet TV CH 11
- GLC Elevate | DTV CH 24-36 | ENet TV CH 12
- GLC Discover | DTV CH 24-40 | ENet TV CH 14
- MOE Central | DTV CH 24-44 | ENet TV CH 14
- GLC Teen | DTV CH 24-48 | ENet TV CH 12
- GLC Jr. | DTV CH 24-52 | ENet TV CH 10

==== Linden ====
Analog stations:

- National Communications Network (NCN Linden) | VHF 8 | VHF 13
- Guyana Learning Channel Trust | VHF 10

Digital stations:

- GLC Elementary | DTV CH 24-32 | ENet TV CH 11
- GLC Elevate | DTV CH 24-36 | ENet TV CH 12
- GLC Discover | DTV CH 24-40 | ENet TV CH 14
- MOE Central | DTV CH 24-44 | ENet TV CH 14
- GLC Teen | DTV CH 24-48 | ENet TV CH 12
- GLC Jr. | DTV CH 24-52 | ENet TV CH 10

==== Port Kaituma ====
Analog stations:

- Guyana Learning Channel Trust | VHF 10 | ENet TV CH 9

Digital stations:

- GLC Elementary | DTV CH 24-32 | ENet TV CH 11
- GLC Elevate | DTV CH 24-36 | ENet TV CH 12
- GLC Discover | DTV CH 24-40 | ENet TV CH 14
- MOE Central | DTV CH 24-44 | ENet TV CH 14
- GLC Teen | DTV CH 24-48 | ENet TV CH 12
- GLC Jr. | DTV CH 24-52 | ENet TV CH 10

==== Berbice ====
- Guyana Learning Channel Trust | VHF 3 - Ituni, New Amsterdam, Annai, Aishalton, Mahdia, & Bartica
- Dave's Televisison Station (DTV8) | VHF 8
- KTV | VHF 8 - Kwakwani
- Little Rock Television (LRTVS) | VHF 10
- Television Guyana (TVG) | VHF 12
- National Communications Network (NCN unknown if NCN Berbice or NCN HD) | UHF 15
- Countryside Broadcasting Inc. (CTV19) | UHF 19
- National Television Network (NTN Berbice) | UHF 26/77

Digital stations:

- CTV19 | DTV CH 19-1
- GLC Elementary | DTV CH 24-32 | ENet TV CH 11
- GLC Elevate | DTV CH 24-36 | ENet TV CH 12
- GLC Discover | DTV CH 24-40 | ENet TV CH 14
- MOE Central | DTV CH 24-44 | ENet TV CH 14
- GLC Teen | DTV CH 24-48 | ENet TV CH 12
- GLC Jr. | DTV CH 24-52 | ENet TV CH 10

==== Essequibo ====
Analog stations:

- Tarzie's Transmission Service (TTS) | VHF 5
- Guyana Learning Channel Trust | VHF 5 - Karasabai & Lethem | VHF 10 - Charity | ENet TV CH 9
- Pinnacle Communications (RCA TV 8) | VHF 8 (shut down in 2025)
- Premium Communication Services (PCN15) | UHF 15/66
- National Communications Network (NCN Guyana) | UHF 25

Digital stations:

- GLC Elementary | DTV CH 24-32 | ENet TV CH 11
- GLC Elevate | DTV CH 24-36 | ENet TV CH 12
- GLC Discover | DTV CH 24-40 | ENet TV CH 14
- MOE Central | DTV CH 24-44 | ENet TV CH 14
- GLC Teen | DTV CH 24-48 | ENet TV CH 12
- GLC Jr. | DTV CH 24-52 | ENet TV CH 10

==== ENet TV ====
- E1 | CH 1
- E2 | CH 2
- E3 | CH 3
- Skar TV | CH 7
- Sankhya TV | CH 8

==== Air Link TV ====
- Air Link TV 1 | CH 1
- IBN | CH 7
- M&E TV | CH 8
- TIN | CH 10
- Caribbean Gospel TV (CGTV) | CH 51

==== Atlantic Cable TV Network ====
- FRESH TV | CH 1

=== Islas Malvinas (Falkland Islands) ===
- British Forces Broadcasting Service (BFBS)
- Falkland Islands Television Service
- KTV Ltd.

=== Paraguay ===
- Red Guaraní (Canal 2)
- Telefuturo (Canal 4)
- Paravisión (Canal 5)
- SNT (Canal 9)
- Red Paraguaya de Comunicaciones (Canal 13)
- Paraguay TV (Canal 14)
- Unicanal
- Tigo Sports

=== Peru ===
- América (Canal 4)
- ATV (Canal 9)
- ATV Sur
- ATV+
- Canal IPe
- Canal N
- Global
- Latina
- Panamericana
- Movistar Plus
- TV Perú
- TV Perú Noticias
- La Tele

=== Uruguay ===
- Canal 4
- Saeta TV (Canal 10) [https://web.archive.org/web/20061001225509/http://www.tveo.com.uy/
- Teledoce (Canal 12)
- Uno TV

== Pay television channels ==
- A&E
- Adult Swim
- AMC
- Animal Planet
- AXN
- Cartoon Network
- Cartoonito
- Cinecanal
- Comedy Central
- Discovery Channel
- Discovery Home & Health
- Discovery Kids
- Discovery Turbo
- Disney Channel
- Disney Jr.
- DreamWorks Channel
- E!
- ESPN
- ESPN 2
- ESPN 3
- ESPN 4
- ESPN 5
- ESPN 6
- ESPN 7
- ESPN Premium
- Food Network
- FX
- Golf Channel
- HBO
- HGTV
- History
- History 2
- HTV
- Investigation Discovery
- Lifetime
- MTV
- National Geographic
- Nickelodeon
- Nick Jr.
- Paramount Network
- Sony Channel
- Sony Movies
- Space
- Star Channel
- Studio Universal
- TLC
- TCM
- TNT
- TNT Novelas
- TNT Series
- Tooncast
- Universal TV
- Universal+
- USA Network
- Warner Channel

== See also ==
- List of countries by number of television broadcast stations
- List of local television stations in South America
- List of television networks by country
- List of television stations in Brazil
- List of television stations in Latin America
- Lists of television stations in North America
- List of television stations in North America by media market
- Lists of television channels
- North American call sign
