= List of television stations in Yucatán =

The following is a list of all IFT-licensed over-the-air television stations broadcasting in the Mexican state of Yucatán. There are 13 television stations in Yucatán.

== List of television stations ==
RF	VC	Call sign	Location	Network/name	ERP	Concessionaire
31	1	XHDH-TDT	Mérida	Azteca Uno (adn40)	97.952 kW	Televisión Azteca
30	2	XHTP-TDT	Mérida	Las Estrellas (FOROtv)	125 kW	Televisora Peninsular
22	3	XHCTMD-TDT	Mérida	Imagen Televisión (Excélsior TV)	60 kW	Cadena Tres I, S.A. de C.V.
28	4	XHST-TDT	Mérida	Tele Yucatán	100 kW	Sistema Tele Yucatán (Gobierno del Estado de Yucatán)
35	5	XHMEN-TDT	Mérida	Canal 5 (9.1 Nu9ve)	125 kW	Radio Televisión
33	7	XHMEY-TDT	Mérida	Azteca 7 (a+)	97.708 kW	Televisión Azteca
25	8	XHY-TDT	Mérida	SIPSE Televisión (6.1 Multimedios Televisión)	122.6 kW	Televisora de Yucatán (Grupo SIPSE)
24	13	XHTMYC-TDT	Mérida	Telsusa (Canal 13)	160.6 kW	Telsusa Televisión México
23	14	XHSPRME-TDT	Mérida	SPR multiplex (11.1 Canal Once, 14.1 Canal Catorce, 20.1 TV UNAM, 22.1 Canal 22)	33.6 kW	Sistema Público de Radiodifusión del Estado Mexicano
23	1	XHKYU-TDT	Valladolid/Kahua	Azteca Uno (adn40)	4.76 kW	Televisión Azteca
32	2/5	XHVTT-TDT	Valladolid; Tizimín	Las Estrellas (Canal 5)	60 kW; 28 kW	Televimex
24	7	XHVAD-TDT	Valladolid/Kahua	Azteca 7	4.75 kW	Televisión Azteca
27	13	XHTMYU-TDT	Valladolid–Tizimín	Telsusa (Canal 13)	80.120 kW	Telsusa Televisión México
