= List of television stations in Colima =

The following is a list of all IFT-licensed over-the-air television stations broadcasting in the Mexican state of Colima. There are 16 television stations in Colima.

== List of television stations ==
RF	VC	Call sign	Location	Network/name	ERP	Concessionaire
18	1	XHKF-TDT	Atenquique, Jal. Colima (Cerro La Cumbre) (Note: Primary transmitter at Atenquique on Nevado de Colima. Shadow transmitter in Colima.)	Azteca Uno (adn40)	24.14 kW; 9.42 kW	Televisión Azteca
16	2	XHBZ-TDT	Colima; Manzanillo; Cd. Guzmán, Jal.	Las Estrellas (FOROtv)	54 kW; 30 kW; 15 kW	Televimex
27	3	XHCTCO-TDT	Colima	Imagen Televisión (Excélsior TV)	50 kW	Cadena Tres I, S.A. de C.V.
17	5	XHCC-TDT	Colima; Manzanillo (RF 14); Cd. Guzmán, Jal.	Canal 5	54 kW; 30 kW; 15 kW	Radio Televisión
19	7	XHCOL-TDT	Atenquique, Jal. Colima (Cerro La Cumbre)	Azteca 7 (a+)	24.25 kW; 9.44 kW	Televisión Azteca
26	9	XHCKW-TDT	Colima	Nu9ve	54 kW	Teleimagen del Noroeste
11	12	XHCPAL-TDT	Colima	Canal 12	1.15 kW	Gobierno del Estado de Colima
21	14	XHSPRCO-TDT	Colima	SPR multiplex (11.1 Canal Once, 14.1 Canal Catorce, 14.2 Ingenio Tv, 20.1 TV UNAM, 22.1 Canal 22, 45.1 Canal del Congreso)	5.25 kW	Sistema Público de Radiodifusión del Estado Mexicano
21	2	XHIOC-TDT	Isla Socorro	Las Estrellas	2 kW	Televimex
21	1	XHDR-TDT	Manzanillo	Azteca Uno (adn40)	10.47 kW	Televisión Azteca
31	7	XHNCI-TDT	Manzanillo	Azteca 7	12.24 kW	Televisión Azteca
36	9	XHMAW-TDT	Manzanillo	Nu9ve	35 kW	Teleimagen del Noroeste
13	12	XHPBMZ-TDT	Manzanillo	Canal 12	17.208 kW	Gobierno del Estado de Colima
22	1	XHTCA-TDT	Tecomán	Azteca Uno (adn40)	4.560 kW	Televisión Azteca
23	2/5	XHTEC-TDT	Tecomán/Armería	Las Estrellas (Canal 5)	33 kW	Televimex
29	7	XHTCO-TDT	Tecomán	Azteca 7 (a+)	4.29 kW	Televisión Azteca
