= List of television stations in Querétaro =

The following is a list of all IFT-licensed over-the-air television stations broadcasting in the Mexican state of Querétaro. There are 9 television stations in Querétaro.

== List of television stations ==
RF	VC	Call sign	Location	Network/name	ERP	Concessionaire
26	1	XHQUR-TDT	Querétaro (Cerro El Cimatario)	Azteca Uno (adn40)	301.070 kW	Televisión Azteca
32	2	XHZ-TDT	Querétaro (Cerro El Zamorano); Cerro El Cimatario (RF 9); Guanajuato, Gto. Irapuato-Celaya, Gto. San Miguel de Allende, Gto.	Las Estrellas (FOROtv)	180 kW; 20 kW; 20 kW; 50 kW; 65 kW	Televimex
15	3	XHCTCY-TDT	Querétaro (Cerro El Cimatario)	Imagen Televisión (Excélsior TV)	150 kW	Cadena Tres I, S.A. de C.V.
29	5	XEZ-TDT	Querétaro (Cerro El Zamorano); Cerro El Cimatario (RF 10); Guanajuato, Gto. Irapuato-Celaya, Gto. San Miguel de Allende, Gto.	Canal 5	180 kW; 20 kW; 20 kW; 50 kW; 65 kW	Radio Televisión
34	7	XHQUE-TDT	Querétaro (Cerro El Cimatario)	Azteca 7 (a+)	298.85 kW	Televisión Azteca
18	9	XHQCZ-TDT	Querétaro (Cerro El Zamorano); Cerro El Cimatario (RF 8); Irapuato-Celaya, Gto.	Nu9ve	190 kW; 20 kW; 10 kW	Teleimagen del Noroeste
14	10	XHSECE-TDT	Querétaro (Cerro El Cimatario)	RTQ	5 kW	Sistema Estatal de Comunicación Cultural y Educativa del Gobierno de Querétaro
30	14	XHSPRMQ-TDT	Querétaro (Cerro El Cimatario)	SPR multiplex (11.1 Canal Once, 14.1 Canal Catorce, 20.1 TV UNAM, 22.1 Canal 22)	11.2 kW	Sistema Público de Radiodifusión del Estado Mexicano
11	24	XHPBQR-TDT	Querétaro	TV UAQ	14.998 kW	Universidad Autónoma de Querétaro
