= List of television stations in Sonora =

The following is a list of all CRT-licensed over-the-air television stations broadcasting in the Mexican state of Sonora.

== List of television stations ==
RF	VC	Call sign	Location	Network/name	ERP	Concessionaire
14	15	XHADO-TDT	Adivino	Telemax	.036 kW	Gobierno del Estado de Sonora
22	15	XHAPS-TDT	Agua Prieta	Telemax	2.5 kW	Gobierno del Estado de Sonora
17	2	XHAPT-TDT	Agua Prieta	Las Estrellas	25 kW	Televimex
22	15	XHALM-TDT	Álamos	Telemax	.15 kW	Gobierno del Estado de Sonora
22	15	XHACH-TDT	Arivechi	Telemax	.267 kW	Gobierno del Estado de Sonora
14	15	XHAZP-TDT	Arizpe	Telemax	.13 kW	Gobierno del Estado de Sonora
14	15	XHALS-TDT	Átil	Telemax	.05 kW	Gobierno del Estado de Sonora
14	15	XHBNI-TDT	Bacadehuachi	Telemax	.036 kW	Gobierno del Estado de Sonora
14	15	XHBCA-TDT	Bacanora	Telemax	.023 kW	Gobierno del Estado de Sonora
16	15	XHBAC-TDT	Bacerac	Telemax	.036 kW	Gobierno del Estado de Sonora
14	15	XHBCI-TDT	Bacoachi	Telemax	.036 kW	Gobierno del Estado de Sonora
30	15	XHBAS-TDT	Banamichi	Telemax	.036 kW	Gobierno del Estado de Sonora
14	15	XHBVA-TDT	Baviacora	Telemax	0.7 kW	Gobierno del Estado de Sonora
14	15	XHBVE-TDT	Bavispe	Telemax	.3 kW	Gobierno del Estado de Sonora
14	15	XHBNL-TDT	Benjamin Hill	Telemax	.1 kW	Gobierno del Estado de Sonora
35	2	XHSVT-TDT	Caborca	Las Estrellas	37 kW	Televimex
17	5	XHCBO-TDT	Caborca	Canal 5	37 kW	Radio Televisión
36	15	XHCAS-TDT	Caborca	Telemax	2.5 kW	Gobierno del Estado de Sonora
34	2	XHCNS-TDT	Cananea	Las Estrellas	32 kW	Televimex
25	7	XHCAN-TDT	Cananea	Azteca 7	5.11 kW	Televisión Azteca
5	15	XHCPCA-TDT	Cananea	Telemax		Gobierno del Estado de Sonora
15	15	XHCRO-TDT	Carbó	Telemax	.5 kW	Gobierno del Estado de Sonora
33	1	XHCSO-TDT	Ciudad Obregón	Azteca Uno (adn40)	38.46 kW	Televisión Azteca
24	3	XHCTOB-TDT	Ciudad Obregón	Imagen Televisión (Excélsior TV)	120 kW	Cadena Tres I, S. A. de C.V.
36	5	XHCDO-TDT	Ciudad Obregón	Canal 5 (9.1 Nu9ve, 12.1 Televisa Sonora)	200 kW	Radio Televisión
35	7	XHBK-TDT	Ciudad Obregón	Azteca 7 (a+)	45.75 kW	Televisión Azteca
32; 34	10	XHI-TDT	Ciudad Obregón; Empalme/Guaymas	Televisa local	125 kW; 5 kW	Televisora del Yaqui
31	14	XHSPROS-TDT	Ciudad Obregón	SPR multiplex (11.1 Canal Once, 14.1 Canal Catorce, 14.2 Ingenio Tv, 20.1 TV UNAM, 22.1 Canal 22, 45.1 Canal del Congreso)	57.34 kW	Sistema Público de Radiodifusión del Estado Mexicano
25	15	XHCPBY-TDT	Ciudad Obregón	Telemax		Gobierno del Estado de Sonora
14	15	XHRPS-TDT	Cucurpe	Telemax	.036 kW	Gobierno del Estado de Sonora
34	15	XHCPS-TDT	Cumpas	Telemax	.05 kW	Gobierno del Estado de Sonora
16	15	XHDVS-TDT	Divisaderos	Telemax		Gobierno del Estado de Sonora
19	15	XHFAS-TDT	Fronteras	Telemax	.036 kW	Gobierno del Estado de Sonora
28	15	XHGDS-TDT	Granados	Telemax	.036 kW	Gobierno del Estado de Sonora
21	1/7	XHHN-TDT	Guaymas	Azteca Uno (Azteca 7)	12.34 kW	Televisión Azteca
20	2	XHGST-TDT	Guaymas	Las Estrellas	46 kW	Televimex
29	5	XHGUY-TDT	Guaymas	Canal 5	46 kW	Radio Televisión
18	15	XHSGU-TDT	Guaymas	Telemax	5 kW	Gobierno del Estado de Sonora
24	1	XHHSS-TDT	Hermosillo	Azteca Uno (adn40)	38.950 kW	Televisión Azteca
23	2	XHHES-TDT	Hermosillo	Las Estrellas (FOROtv)	100 kW	Televimex
28	3	XHCTHE-TDT	Hermosillo	Imagen Televisión (Excélsior TV)	100 kW	Cadena Tres I, S.A. de C.V.
29	5	XHHMS-TDT	Hermosillo	Canal 5	100 kW	Radio Televisión
30	7	XHHO-TDT	Hermosillo	Azteca 7 (a+)	39.43 kW	Televisión Azteca
8	8	XHUS-TDT	Hermosillo	Televisión Universitaria	38.43 kW	Universidad de Sonora
31	9	XHHMA-TDT	Hermosillo	Nu9ve	100 kW	Teleimagen del Noroeste
33	12	XHAK-TDT	Hermosillo	Televisa Regional	100 kW	Televisora de Occidente
27	14	XHSPRHA-TDT	Hermosillo	SPR multiplex (11.1 Canal Once, 14.1 Canal Catorce, 20.1 TV UNAM, 22.1 Canal 22)	43.8 kW	Sistema Público de Radiodifusión del Estado Mexicano
19	15	XEWH-TDT	Hermosillo	Telemax	40 kW	Televisora de Hermosillo (Gobierno del Estado de Sonora)
14	15	XHHCH-TDT	Huachinera	Telemax	.036 kW	Gobierno del Estado de Sonora
18	15	XHHAS-TDT	Huásabas	Telemax	.5 kW	Gobierno del Estado de Sonora
19	15	XHIMS-TDT	Imuris	Telemax	.05 kW	Gobierno del Estado de Sonora
14	15	XHMDS-TDT	Magdalena de Kino	Telemax	.05 kW	Gobierno del Estado de Sonora
21	2	XHMST-TDT	Magdalena de Kino	Las Estrellas	24 kW	Televimex
34	15	XHMZN-TDT	Mazatán	Telemax	.036 kW	Gobierno del Estado de Sonora
31	15	XHMOS-TDT	Moctezuma	Telemax	0.7 kW	Gobierno del Estado de Sonora
33	15	XHNAC-TDT	Naco	Telemax	.036 kW	Gobierno del Estado de Sonora
14	15	XHNCO-TDT	Nácori Chico	Telemax	.036 kW	Gobierno del Estado de Sonora
14	15	XHNGE-TDT	Nácori Grande	Telemax	.036 kW	Gobierno del Estado de Sonora
22	15	XHNCZ-TDT	Nacozari	Telemax	1 kW	Gobierno del Estado de Sonora
27	2	XHBF-TDT	Navojoa	Las Estrellas	65 kW	Televisora de Navojoa
15	1	XHFA-TDT	Nogales; Cananea	Azteca Uno (adn40)	77.34 kW; 13.94 kW	Televisión Azteca
17	2	XHNOS-TDT	Nogales	Las Estrellas	35 kW	Televimex
26	5	XHNON-TDT	Nogales	Canal 5	35 kW	Radio Televisión
24	7	XHNOA-TDT	Nogales	Azteca 7	76.82 kW	Televisión Azteca
31	8	XHNSS-TDT	Nogales	Local independent	42.46 kW	Jaime Juaristi Santos
14	15	XHONV-TDT	Ónavas	Telemax	.023 kW	Gobierno del Estado de Sonora
15	15	XHOQT-TDT	Oquitoa	Telemax	.036 kW	Gobierno del Estado de Sonora
22	2/5	XHPDT-TDT	Puerto Peñasco	Las Estrellas (Canal 5)	32 kW	Televimex
21	7/1	XHPPS-TDT	Puerto Peñasco	Azteca 7 (Azteca Uno)	1.82 kW	Televisión Azteca
20	15	XHCPCZ-TDT	Puerto Peñasco	Telemax		Gobierno del Estado de Sonora
16	15	XHQBI-TDT	Querobabi	Telemax	.05 kW	Gobierno del Estado de Sonora
15	15	XHRON-TDT	Rayon	Telemax	.05 kW	Gobierno del Estado de Sonora
35	15	XHRSO-TDT	Rosario	Telemax	.2 kW	Gobierno del Estado de Sonora
20	15	XHSPA-TDT	Sahuaripa	Telemax	1 kW	Gobierno del Estado de Sonora
18	15	XHSFS-TDT	San Felipe de Jesús	Telemax	.05 kW	Gobierno del Estado de Sonora
14	15	XHSJR-TDT	San Javier	Telemax	.023 kW	Gobierno del Estado de Sonora
32	2/5	XHLRT-TDT	San Luis Río Colorado	Las Estrellas (Canal 5)	55 kW	Televimex
30	15	XHRCS-TDT	San Luis Río Colorado	Telemax	10.2 kW	Gobierno del Estado de Sonora
14	15	XHSPE-TDT	San Pedro de la Cueva	Telemax	.05 kW	Gobierno del Estado de Sonora
15	15	XHSAS-TDT	Santa Ana	Telemax		Gobierno del Estado de Sonora
14	15	XHSCZ-TDT	Santa Cruz	Telemax	.036 kW	Gobierno del Estado de Sonora
14	15	XHSIC-TDT	Sáric	Telemax	.023 kW	Gobierno del Estado de Sonora
14	15	XHSSE-TDT	Sásabe	Telemax	.023 kW	Gobierno del Estado de Sonora
17	15	XHSQP-TDT	Sinoquipe	Telemax	.05 kW	Gobierno del Estado de Sonora
14	15	XHSYT-TDT	Sonoyta	Telemax		Gobierno del Estado de Sonora
35	15	XHSYO-TDT	Soyopa	Telemax	.05 kW	Gobierno del Estado de Sonora
34	15	XHSGE-TDT	Suaqui Grande	Telemax	.023 kW	Gobierno del Estado de Sonora
14	15	XHTCE-TDT	Tepache	Telemax	.05 kW	Gobierno del Estado de Sonora
14	15	XHUES-TDT	Ures	Telemax	1.9 kW	Gobierno del Estado de Sonora
14	15	XHVHO-TDT	Villa Hidalgo	Telemax	.036 kW	Gobierno del Estado de Sonora
31	15	XHVPA-TDT	Villa Pesqueira	Telemax	.036 kW	Gobierno del Estado de Sonora
17	15	XHCPCC-TDT	Yécora	Telemax		Gobierno del Estado de Sonora
