= List of television stations in Campeche =

The following is a list of all IFT-licensed over-the-air television stations broadcasting in the Mexican state of Campeche. There are 15 television stations in Campeche.

== List of television stations ==
RF	VC	Call sign	Location	Network/name	ERP	Concessionaire
29	1	XHGE-TDT	Campeche	Azteca Uno (adn40)	20.33 kW	Televisión Azteca
34	2	XHCPA-TDT	Campeche	Las Estrellas (FOROtv)	28 kW	Televimex
20	3	XHCTCA-TDT	Campeche	Imagen Televisión (Excélsior TV)	50 kW	Cadena Tres I, S.A. de C.V.
30	4	XHCCA-TDT	Campeche	TRC	10 kW	Gobierno del Estado de Campeche
22	5/9	XHAN-TDT	Campeche	Canal 5 (Nu9ve)	28 kW	Radio Televisión
24	7	XHCAM-TDT	Campeche	Azteca 7 (a+)	20.46 kW	Televisión Azteca
27	13	XHTMCA-TDT	Campeche	Telsusa (Canal 13) (TN23)	49.035 kW	Telsusa Televisión México
14	11	XHCPES-TDT	Campeche	Canal Once		Instituto Politécnico Nacional
32	14	XHSPRCC-TDT	Campeche	SPR multiplex (11.1 Canal Once, 14.1 Canal Catorce, 14.2 Ingenio Tv, 20.1 TV UNAM, 22.1 Canal 22, 45.1 Canal del Congreso)	8.18 kW	Sistema Público de Radiodifusión del Estado Mexicano
35	1	XHGN-TDT	Ciudad del Carmen	Azteca Uno (adn40)	8.16 kW	Televisión Azteca
22	2/5	XHCDC-TDT	Ciudad del Carmen	Las Estrellas (Canal 5)	31 kW	Televimex
31	7	XHCCT-TDT	Ciudad del Carmen	Azteca 7	21.74 kW	Televisión Azteca
25	13	XHTMCC-TDT	Ciudad del Carmen	Telsusa (Canal 13) (TN23)	150 kW	Telsusa Televisión México
7		XHCPEQ-TDT	Ciudad del Carmen			Instituto Politécnico Nacional
8		XHCPER-TDT	Ciudad del Carmen			Sistema Público de Radiodifusión del Estado Mexicano
29	1	XHPEH-TDT	Escárcega	Azteca Uno (adn40)	7.23 kW	Televisión Azteca
21	2	XHEFT-TDT	Escárcega	Las Estrellas	18 kW	Televimex
27	7	XHECA-TDT	Escárcega	Azteca 7	7.27 kW	Televisión Azteca
