= List of television stations in Oaxaca =

The following is a list of all IFT-licensed over-the-air television stations broadcasting in the Mexican state of Oaxaca.

== List of television stations ==
RF	VC	Call sign	Location	Network/name	ERP	Concessionaire
33	1	XHJN-TDT	Huajuapan de León	Azteca Uno (adn40)	22.840 kW	Televisión Azteca
31	2	XHHLO-TDT	Huajuapan de León; Tehuacán, Pue.	Las Estrellas (FOROtv)	76 kW; 36 kW	Televimex
28	3	XHCTHL-TDT	Huajuapan de León	Imagen Televisión (Excélsior TV)		Cadena Tres I, S.A. de C.V.
19	5	XHHHN-TDT	Huajuapan de León; Tehuacán, Pue.	Canal 5	76 kW; 36 kW	Radio Televisión
29	7	XHHDL-TDT	Huajuapan de León	Azteca 7	23.430 kW	Televisión Azteca
25	1	XHIG-TDT	Matías Romero (C. Palma Sola)	Azteca Uno (adn40)	48.21 kW	Televisión Azteca
21	2	XHPAO-TDT	Cerro Palma Sola	Las Estrellas	76 kW	Televimex
35	5	XHIH-TDT	Tehuantepec (C. Palma Sola)	Canal 5	76 kW	Radio Televisión
30	7	XHPSO-TDT	Matías Romero (C. Palma Sola); Salina Cruz	Azteca 7 (a+)	47.63 kW; 17.24 kW	Televisión Azteca
23	2	XHMIO-TDT	Miahuatlán de Porfirio Díaz	Las Estrellas	18 kW	Televimex
27	1	XHOXX-TDT	Oaxaca	Azteca Uno (adn40)	57.91 kW	Televisión Azteca
29	2	XHBN-TDT	Oaxaca	Las Estrellas (FOROtv)	97 kW	Televimex
16	3	XHCTOX-TDT	Oaxaca	Imagen Televisión (Excélsior TV)	120 kW	Cadena Tres I, S.A. de C.V.
32	4	XHBO-TDT	Oaxaca	Oaxaca TV	102.929 kW	Televisora XHBO
34	5	XHOXO-TDT	Oaxaca	Canal 5 (8.1 Nu9ve)	97 kW	Radio Televisión
26	7	XHDG-TDT	Oaxaca	Azteca 7 (a+)	58 kW	Televisión Azteca
36	9	XHCPBR-TDT	Oaxaca (with 15 repeaters statewide)	CORTV	20 kW	Gobierno del Estado de Oaxaca
35	14	XHSPROA-TDT	Oaxaca	SPR multiplex (11.1 Canal Once, 14.1 Canal Catorce, 20.1 TV UNAM, 22.1 Canal 22)	18.14 kW	Sistema Público de Radiodifusión del Estado Mexicano
24	1/7	XHINC-TDT	Pinotepa Nacional; San Juan Cacahuatepec	Azteca Uno (Azteca 7)	4.41 kW; 20.97 kW	Televisión Azteca
32	2	XHPNO-TDT	Pinotepa Nacional	Las Estrellas	46 kW	Televimex
34	5	XHPIX-TDT	Pinotepa Nacional	Canal 5	46 kW	Radio Televisión
36	2/5	XHPAT-TDT	Puerto Ángel	Las Estrellas (Canal 5)	24 kW	Televimex
33	1	XHPCE-TDT	Puerto Escondido	Azteca Uno (Azteca 7)	159.97 kW	Televisión Azteca
31	2/5	XHPET-TDT	Puerto Escondido	Las Estrellas (Canal 5)	21 kW	Televimex
23	7	XHJP-TDT	Puerto Escondido	Azteca 7	8.39 kW	Televisión Azteca
28	1	XHSCO-TDT	Salina Cruz	Azteca Uno (adn40)	3.33 kW	Televisión Azteca
36	7/1	XHSMT-TDT	San Miguel Tlacotepec	Azteca 7 (Azteca Uno)	1.09 kW	Televisión Azteca
