= List of television stations in Michoacán =

The following is a list of all Federal Telecommunications Institute-licensed over-the-air television stations broadcasting in the Mexican state of Michoacán. There are 41 television stations in Michoacán.

== List of television stations ==
RF	VC	Call sign	Location	Network/name	ERP	Concessionaire
25	2	XHAPN-TDT	Apatzingán	Las Estrellas	47 kW	Televimex
21	5	XHAPZ-TDT	Apatzingán	Canal 5	47 kW	Radio Televisión
26	16	XHAPA-TDT	Apatzingán	SMRTV	.151 kW	Gobierno del Estado de Michoacán
21	2/5	XHCHM-TDT	Ciudad Hidalgo	Las Estrellas (Canal 5)	14 kW	Televimex
34	16	XHMHG-TDT	Ciudad Hidalgo	SMRTV	.114 kW	Gobierno del Estado de Michoacán
11	16	XHPBHU-TDT	Huetamo	SMRTV	1.196 kW	Gobierno del Estado de Michoacán
21	16	XHMJI-TDT	Jiquilpan	SMRTV	.226 kW	Gobierno del Estado de Michoacán
22	16	XHPMG-TDT	La Piedad	SMRTV	.146 kW	Gobierno del Estado de Michoacán
26	1/7	XHLCM-TDT	Lazaro Cárdenas	Azteca Uno (Azteca 7)	9.18 kW	Televisión Azteca
30	2	XHLBT-TDT	Lazaro Cárdenas	Las Estrellas	25 kW	Televimex
33	5	XHLAC-TDT	Lazaro Cárdenas	Canal 5	25 kW	Radio Televisión
29	16	XHLAM-TDT	Lazaro Cárdenas	SMRTV	.151 kW	Gobierno del Estado de Michoacán
31	2	XHLRM-TDT	Los Reyes	Las Estrellas	22 kW	Televimex
16	2	XHKW-TDT	Morelia	Las Estrellas	47.2 kW	Jose Humberto y Loucille Martínez Morales
34	3	XHCTMO-TDT	Morelia	Imagen Televisión (Excélsior TV)	50 kW	Cadena Tres I, S.A. de C.V.
18	5	XHFX-TDT	Morelia	Canal 5	47.2 kW	Televisión de Michoacán
29	5	XHMOW-TDT	Morelia (Cerro Burro)	Canal 5 (9.1 Nu9ve)	338 kW	Radio Televisión
32	7	XHBUR-TDT	Morelia	Azteca 7 (a+)	257.89 kW	Televisión Azteca
19	14	XHSPRMO-TDT	Morelia	SPR multiplex (11.1 Canal Once, 14.1 Canal Catorce, 20.1 TV UNAM, 22.1 Canal 22)	2.00 kW	Sistema Público de Radiodifusión del Estado Mexicano
14	16	XHMOR-TDT	Morelia	SMRTV	2.951 kW	Gobierno del Estado de Michoacán
24	1/7	XHCBM-TDT	Pátzcuaro (Cerro Burro); Morelia; Zamora; Apatzingán	Azteca Uno (Azteca 7)	64.71 kW; 87.894 kW; 14.43 kW; 17.377 kW	Televisión Azteca
25	2/5	XHPUM-TDT	Puruándiro	Las Estrellas (Canal 5)	37 kW	Televimex
34	16	XHMPU-TDT	Puruandiro	SMRTV	.114 kW	Gobierno del Estado de Michoacán
14	2/5	XHSAM-TDT	Sahuayo-Jiquilpan	Las Estrellas (Canal 5)	20 kW	Televimex
34	16	XHMTC-TDT	Tacámbaro	SMRTV	.114 kW	Gobierno del Estado de Michoacán
30	2	XHURT-TDT	Uruapan (Cerro Burro)	Las Estrellas (FOROtv)	338 kW	Televimex
36	3	XHCTUR-TDT	Uruapan	Imagen Televisión (Excélsior TV)	0.5 kW	Cadena Tres I, S.A. de C.V.
15	12	XHJGMI-TDT	Uruapan	Multimedios Michoacán	0.1 kW	José Guadalupe Manuel Trejo García
27	13	XHBG-TDT	Uruapan; Zamora	Telsusa (Canal 13)	300 kW; 30 kW	Telsusa Televisión México, S.A. de C.V.
14	14	XHSPRUM-TDT	Uruapan	SPR multiplex (11.1 Canal Once, 14.1 Canal Catorce, 14.2 Ingenio Tv, 20.1 TV UNAM, 22.1 Canal 22, 45.1 Canal del Congreso)	9.43 kW	Sistema Público de Radiodifusión del Estado Mexicano
34	16	XHURU-TDT	Uruapan	SMRTV	.147 kW	Gobierno del Estado de Michoacán
34	16	XHMZA-TDT	Zacapu	SMRTV	.114 kW	Gobierno del Estado de Michoacán
29	2	XHZMT-TDT	Zamora	Las Estrellas (FOROtv)	32 kW	Televimex
25	5	XHZAM-TDT	Zamora	Canal 5 (9.1 Nu9ve)	32 kW	Radio Televisión
23	7	XHRAM-TDT	Zamora; Uruapan; Purépero	Azteca 7 (a+)	30.85 kW; 29.93 kW	Televisión Azteca
34	16	XHTZA-TDT	Zamora	SMRTV	.295 kW	Gobierno del Estado de Michoacán
36	2	XHZIM-TDT	Zinapécuaro	Las Estrellas	30 kW	Televimex
25	2/5	XHZMM-TDT	Zitácuaro	Las Estrellas (Canal 5)	10 kW	Televimex
15	7	XHTCM-TDT	Zitácuaro; Ciudad Hidalgo	Azteca 7	16.21 kW; 14.9 kW	Televisión Azteca
22	16	XHMZI-TDT	Zitácuaro	SMRTV	.113 kW	Gobierno del Estado de Michoacán
