= List of television stations in Tabasco =

The following is a list of all IFT-licensed over-the-air television stations broadcasting in the Mexican state of Tabasco. There are 16 television stations in Tabasco.

== List of television stations ==
RF	VC	Call sign	Location	Network/name	ERP	Concessionaire
27	2/5	XHFRT-TDT	Frontera	Las Estrellas (Canal 5)	18 kW	Televimex
33	7/1	XHLAV-TDT	La Venta	Azteca 7 (Azteca Uno)	.97 kW	Televisión Azteca
31	2/5	XHUBT-TDT	La Venta	Las Estrellas (Canal 5)	3 kW	Televimex
34	46	XHVET-TDT	La Venta	TVT	82.2 kW	Televisión Tabasqueña
30	2/5	XHTET-TDT	Tenosique; Palenque, Chis.	Las Estrellas (Canal 5)	28 kW	Televimex
26	13	XHTOE-TDT	Tenosique	Telsusa (Canal 13)	55 kW	Tele-Emisoras del Sureste
34	46	XHMET-TDT	Tenosique	TVT	75.8 kW	Televisión Tabasqueña
29	1	XHVHT-TDT	Villahermosa	Azteca Uno (adn40)	18.79 kW	Televisión Azteca
32	2	XHVIZ-TDT	Villahermosa	Las Estrellas (5.1 Canal 5, 9.1 Nu9ve)	125 kW	Televimex
36	3	XHCTVL-TDT	Villahermosa	Imagen Televisión (Excélsior TV)	100 kW	Cadena Tres I, S.A. de C.V.
33	6	XHLL-TDT	Villahermosa	Canal 6	12 kW	Television de Tabasco
23	7	XHVIH-TDT	Villahermosa	Azteca 7 (a+)	18.88 kW	Televisión Azteca
30	13	XHTVL-TDT	Villahermosa	Telsusa (Canal 13)	160 kW	Tele-Emisoras del Sureste
25	14	XHSPRVT-TDT	Villahermosa	SPR multiplex (11.1 Canal Once, 14.1 Canal Catorce, 14.2 Ingenio Tv, 20.1 TV UNAM, 22.1 Canal 22, 45.1 Canal del Congreso)	13.92 kW	Sistema Público de Radiodifusión del Estado Mexicano
35	35	XHUJAT-TDT	Villahermosa	TV UJAT	39.34 kW	Universidad Juárez Autónoma de Tabasco
34	46	XHSTA-TDT	Villahermosa	TVT	74.3 kW	Televisión Tabasqueña
