= List of television stations in Morelos =

The following is a list of all CRT-licensed over-the-air television stations broadcasting in the Mexican state of Morelos. There are 7 television stations in Morelos.

Televisa network service (Las Estrellas and Canal 5) is supplied by retransmitters of XEX and XHTM at Altzomoni, State of Mexico.

== List of television stations ==
RF	VC	Call sign	Location	Network/name	ERP	Concessionaire
27	1	XHCUR-TDT	Cuernavaca	Azteca Uno (adn40)	239.83 kW	Televisión Azteca
23	3	XHCTCU-TDT	Cuernavaca	Imagen Televisión (Excélsior TV)	80 kW	Cadena Tres I, S.A. de C.V.
22	7	XHCUV-TDT	Cuernavaca	Azteca 7 (a+)	238.21 kW	Televisión Azteca
28	9	XHCUM-TDT	Cuernavaca	Nu9ve	45 kW	Teleimagen del Noroeste
10		XHFE-TDT	Cuernavaca			Patronato para el Fomento de la Educación, S.C.
20	11/14	XHCPDH-TDT	Cuernavaca	Canal Once (Once Niñas y Niños, Canal Catorce)	22.92 kW	Instituto Politécnico Nacional
19	15	XHCMO-TDT	Cuernavaca	El Canal de Morelos	40 kW	Gobierno del Estado de Morelos
