= List of television stations in Hidalgo =

The following is a list of all CRT-licensed over-the-air television stations broadcasting in the Mexican state of Hidalgo. There are 12 television stations in Hidalgo.

Televisa network service (Las Estrellas and Canal 5) for Pachuca is supplied by retransmitters of XEX and XHTM at Altzomoni, State of Mexico.

== List of television stations ==
RF	VC	Call sign	Location	Network/name	ERP	Concessionaire
27	12	XHHUH-TDT	Huejutla de Reyes	Radio y Televisión de Hidalgo	16.28 kW	Gobierno del Estado de Hidalgo
22	12	XHIXM-TDT	Ixmiquilpan	Radio y Televisión de Hidalgo	5.28 kW	Gobierno del Estado de Hidalgo
16	3	XHCTIX-TDT	Ixmiquilpan (Pachuca); Tula de Allende	Imagen Televisión (Excélsior TV)	20 kW; 35 kW	Cadena Tres I, S.A. de C.V.
36	7	XHPHG-TDT	Pachuca	Azteca 7 (a+)	3.97 kW	Televisión Azteca
21	12	XHPAH-TDT	Pachuca	Radio y Televisión de Hidalgo	44.7 kW	Gobierno del Estado de Hidalgo
8	13	XHPEAH-TDT	Pachuca	SUMA TV	5 kW	Universidad Autónoma del Estado de Hidalgo
23	7/1	XHAFC-TDT	San Nicolas Jacala/ Agua Fria Chica	Azteca 7 (Azteca Uno)	1.07 kW	Televisión Azteca
23	12	XHTOH-TDT	Tepeapulco	Radio y Televisión de Hidalgo	4.18 kW	Gobierno del Estado de Hidalgo
14	12	XHTHI-TDT	Tula	Radio y Televisión de Hidalgo	10.32 kW	Gobierno del Estado de Hidalgo
22	12	XHTUH-TDT	Tulancingo	Radio y Televisión de Hidalgo	3.31 kW	Gobierno del Estado de Hidalgo
10	14	XHCPCR-TDT	Tulancingo	Canal Catorce	0.5 kW	Sistema Público de Radiodifusión del Estado Mexicano
24	1/7	XHTGN-TDT	Tulancingo	Azteca Uno (Azteca 7)	9.99 kW	Televisión Azteca
34	2/5	XHTWH-TDT	Tulancingo; Huauchinango, Puebla	Las Estrellas (Canal 5)	45 kW; 0.38 W	Televimex
