= Television in Honduras =

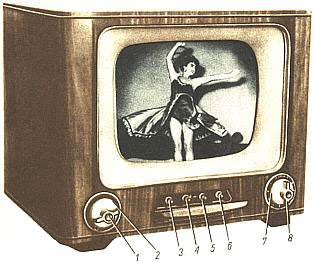
Tube TV-set of 1957-60, model OT-1471 "Belweder"

Television in Honduras consists of both local channels and foreign television, normally distributed through cable.

== History ==
Television was introduced in 1959 on Canal 5 (Channel 5) after the idea came by at a Mexico City hotel the previous year.

Honduras had initially adopted ATSC Standards for digital terrestrial television broadcasting, but later decided to adopt the ISDB-T International standard used in many other Latin American nations.

The first Digital High Definition TV Station, CampusTv, was founded by Universidad de San Pedro Sula.

== Honduran TV channels ==
The following are some of the TV channels founded in Honduras.

- gotv
- Canal 11
- Cholusat Sur Canal 36
- Maya TV Canal 66
- Teleceiba Canal 7
- Televicentro (Honduras)
- Televisión Nacional de Honduras
- MundoTV Canal 42
- Telecentro
- Enlace Honduras Canal 57
- Roatan Travel Network
- CANETTV (VOD)
- HCH

== See also ==
- Media of Honduras
