= List of television stations in Mexico City =

The following is a list of all CRT-licensed over-the-air television stations broadcasting in Mexico City. There are 18 television stations in Mexico City. Mexico City is home to the flagship stations for all major networks.

== List of television stations ==
RF	VC	Call sign	Location	Network/name	ERP	Concessionaire
25	1	XHDF-TDT	Cerro del Chiquihuite	Azteca Uno (Azteca Uno -1)	468.030 kW	Televisión Azteca
32	2	XEW-TDT	Pico Tres Padres (Note: This transmitter location is within the State of Mexico, but the station is licensed to Mexico City.)	Las Estrellas	270 kW	Televimex
29	3	XHCTMX-TDT	Cerro del Chiquihuite	Imagen Televisión (Excélsior TV)	295.411 kW	Cadena Tres I, S.A. de C.V.
15	4	XHTV-TDT	Pico Tres Padres	N+ Foro	270 kW	Televimex
31	5	XHGC-TDT	Pico Tres Padres	Canal 5	270 kW	Radio Televisión
27	6	XHTDMX-TDT	Cerro del Chiquihuite	Canal 6 (Milenio Televisión, CGTN En Español, Popcorn Central)	170 kW	Televisión Digital
24	7	XHIMT-TDT	Cerro del Chiquihuite; Toluca	Azteca 7 (a+)	464.42 kW; 59.046 kW	Televisión Azteca
28	8	XHFAMX-TDT	Cerro del Chiquihuite	Heraldo Televisión (8.2 TV, Unife, Anesma)	300.512 kW	Heraldo Media Group (R.R. Televisión y Valores para la Innovación S.A. de C.V.)
22	9	XEQ-TDT	Pico Tres Padres	Nu9ve	270 kW	Teleimagen del Noroeste
33	11	XEIPN-TDT (Note: Same concession as XEIPN-TDT (3), Jocotitlán, Mex.)	Cerro del Chiquihuite	Canal Once (Once Niñas y Niños)	104.05 kW	Instituto Politécnico Nacional
30	14	XHSPR-TDT	Cerro del Chiquihuite	Canal Catorce (aprende+, TV Migrante)	116.26 kW	Sistema Público de Radiodifusión del Estado Mexicano
11	20	XHUNAM-TDT	Cerro del Chiquihuite	TV UNAM	170 kW	Universidad Nacional Autónoma de México
21	21	XHCDM-TDT	Cerro del Chiquihuite	Capital 21 (Congreso TV)	133.57 kW	Gobierno de la Ciudad de México
23	22	XEIMT-TDT	Cerro del Chiquihuite	Canal 22 (MX Nuestro Cine)	116.49 kW	Secretaría de Cultura (Televisión Metropolitana, S.A. de C.V.)
34	34	XHPTP-TDT (Note: The primary localities to serve for this station, owned by the government of the State of Mexico, are Atizapán, Coacalco, Cuautitlán Izcalli, Tlalnepantla, and Villa de las Flores, but the station covers the entirety of Mexico City as well.)	Pico Tres Padres	Televisión Mexiquense (Mexiquense Noticias, Mexiquense Noticias -1)	400 kW	Gobierno del Estado de México
26	40	XHTVM-TDT	Cerro del Chiquihuite	adn Noticias (Azteca Uno -2)	513.05 kW	Televisora del Valle de México
18	45	XHHCU-TDT	Cerro del Chiquihuite	Canal del Congreso (Canal del Congreso Senado, Canal del Congreso Diputados)	179.14 kW	Congreso de la Unión
9	28	XHCSBO-TDT	Cerro del Chiquihuite	Canal 28	75 kW	Sistema Regional de Televisión, A.C.
13	19	XHSCAG-TDT				Comunicadores Comunitarios del Arte y la Cultura, A.C.
17	26	XHCSAA-TDT				RYSM, A.C.

== Defunct stations ==
- XHTRES-TDT 27 (virtual 10, formerly 28), 1999–2022
