= List of television stations in the State of Mexico =

The following is a list of all CRT-licensed over-the-air television stations broadcasting in the Mexican state of Mexico. There are 14 television stations in the State of Mexico.

== List of television stations ==
RF	VC	Call sign	Location	Network/name	ERP	Concessionaire
36	2	XHTM-TDT	Altzomoni; Tejupilco de Hidalgo; Taxco, Gro. Pachuca, Hgo. Cuernavaca, Mor. Tlaxcala, Tlax.	Las Estrellas (FOROtv)	236 kW; 20 kW; 21 kW; 8 kW; 45 kW; 20 kW; 30 kW	Televimex
14	5	XEX-TDT	Altzomoni; Tejupilco de Hidalgo; Taxco, Gro. Pachuca, Hgo. Cuernavaca, Mor. San Martín Texmelucan, Pue.	Canal 5	236 kW; 20 kW; 21 kW; 8 kW; 45 kW; 20 kW; 30 kW	Radio Televisión
16	9	XHATZ-TDT	Altzomoni	Nu9ve	236 kW	Teleimagen del Noroeste
34	34	XHPTP-TDT	Pico Tres Padres (Municipality of Coacalco)	Mexiquense Televisión (Mexiquense Noticias, Mexiquense Noticias -1)	400 kW	Gobierno del Estado de México
27	1	XHXEM-TDT	Jocotitlán (Toluca); Ixmiquilpan, Hgo. (2016–2018); Zitácuaro, Mich.	Azteca Uno (adn40)	92.8 kW; 17.07 kW; 47.07 kW	Televisión Azteca
19	2	XHTOL-TDT	Toluca/Jocotitlán	Las Estrellas (FOROtv)	45 kW	Televimex
14	3	XHCTTO-TDT	Toluca	Imagen Televisión (Excélsior TV)	26.261 kW	Cadena Tres I, S.A. de C.V.
36	5	XHTOK-TDT	Toluca	Canal 5	280 kW	Radio Televisión
35	7	XHLUC-TDT	Jocotitlán (Toluca); Ixmiquilpan, Hgo.	Azteca 7 (a+)	92.02 kW; 16.93 kW	Televisión Azteca
22	9	XEQ-TDT (Note: This station, while licensed as a repeater of XEQ in Mexico City, airs its own locally-targeted programming under the name Nu9ve Estado de México. Repeaters may air up to 25 percent different programming from their parent stations.)	Toluca/Jocotitlán	Nu9ve Estado de México	200 kW	Teleimagen del Noroeste
30	14	XHSPREM-TDT	Jocotitlán	SPR multiplex (11.1 Canal Once, 14.1 Canal Catorce, 20.1 TV UNAM, 22.1 Canal 22)	168.68 kW	Sistema Público de Radiodifusión del Estado Mexicano
20	34	XHGEM-TDT	Toluca/Jocotitlán	Mexiquense Televisión (Mexiquense Noticias, Mexiquense Noticias -1)	250 kW	Gobierno del Estado de México
21	11	XHCPDG-TDT	Valle de Bravo; Mexico City, Mexico	Canal Once (Once Niñas y Niños)	2.82 kW	Instituto Politécnico Nacional
