= List of television stations in Nayarit =

The following is a list of all CRT-licensed over-the-air television stations broadcasting in the Mexican state of Nayarit. There are 14 television stations in Nayarit.

== List of television stations ==
RF	VC	Call sign	Location	Network/name	ERP	Concessionaire
32	2	XHACN-TDT	Acaponeta-Tecuala	Las Estrellas (Canal 5)	15 kW	Televimex
27	8	XHRTNA-TDT	Acaponeta-Tecuala	8 NTV	13.968 kW	Radio-Televisión Digital de Nayarit
23	2	XHIMN-TDT	Islas Marías	Las Estrellas	3.5 kW	Televimex
5		XHCPCV-TDT	Nuevo Vallarta		4.183 kW	Sistema Público de Radiodifusión del Estado Mexicano
18	2	XHSEN-TDT	Santiago Ixcuintla	Las Estrellas	17 kW	Televimex
30	1	XHAF-TDT	Tepic	Azteca Uno (adn40)	24 kW	Televisión Azteca
28	2	XHTEN-TDT	Tepic	Las Estrellas (FOROtv)	55 kW	Televimex
22	3	XHCTNY-TDT	Tepic	Imagen Televisión (Excélsior TV)	20 kW	Cadena Tres I, S.A. de C.V.
36	4	XHKG-TDT	Tepic	XHKG TV Nayarit	20.04 kW	Lucía Perez Medina, Vda. de Mondragón
33	5	XHTFL-TDT	Tepic	Canal 5 (9.1 Nu9ve)	55 kW	Radio Televisión
31	7	XHLBN-TDT	Tepic	Azteca 7 (a+)	23.970 kW	Televisión Azteca
26	8	XHNTV-TDT	Tepic	8 NTV (6.1 Multimedios Televisión, 6.2 Milenio Televisión)	29.892 kW	Radio-Televisión Digital de Nayarit
24	10	XHTPG-TDT	Tepic	10 TV Nayarit	20 kW	Gobierno del Estado de Nayarit
34	14	XHSPY-TDT	Tepic	Canal Catorce	72.518 kW	Sistema Público de Radiodifusión del Estado Mexicano
