= List of television stations in San Luis Potosí =

The following is a list of all CRT-licensed over-the-air television stations broadcasting in the Mexican state of San Luis Potosí. There are 22 television stations in San Luis Potosí.

== List of television stations ==
RF	VC	Call sign	Location	Network/name	ERP	Concessionaire
30	2	XHCDV-TDT	Ciudad Valles	Las Estrellas (N+ FORO)	18 kW	Televimex
32	5	XHVST-TDT	Ciudad Valles	Canal 5	18 kW	Radio Televisión
27	7/1	XHKD-TDT	Ciudad Valles; Cd. Mante, Tamps.	Azteca 7 (Azteca Uno)	10.13 kW	Televisión Azteca
36	8	XHVSL-TDT	Ciudad Valles; Tamazunchale; Cd. Mante, Tamps.	Televalles	85.673 kW; 2 kW; 1 kW	TV Ocho
12		XHCPCX-TDT	Ciudad Valles		42.002 kW	Sistema Público de Radiodifusión del Estado Mexicano
26	1	XHPMS-TDT	Matehuala	Azteca Uno (adn40)	4.44 kW	Televisión Azteca
29	2/5	XHMTS-TDT	Matehuala	Las Estrellas (Canal 5)	27 kW	Televimex
22	7	XHCDI-TDT	Matehuala	Azteca 7	4.48 kW	Televisión Azteca
33	10	XHCOSL-TDT	Matehuala	Canal 7	60 kW	Comunicación 2000
26	3	XHCTRV-TDT	Rioverde	Imagen Televisión (Excélsior TV)	4 kW	Cadena Tres I, S.A. de C.V.
28	1	XHDD-TDT	San Luis Potosí	Azteca Uno (adn40)	43.42 kW	Televisión Azteca
31	2	XHSLA-TDT	San Luis Potosí	Las Estrellas (N+ FORO)	210 kW	Televimex
33	3	XHCTSL-TDT	San Luis Potosí	Imagen Televisión (Excélsior TV)	29.743 kW	Cadena Tres I, S.A. de C.V.
34	5	XHSLT-TDT	San Luis Potosí	Canal 5 (8.1 Nu9ve)	210 kW	Radio Televisión
22	7	XHCLP-TDT	San Luis Potosí	Azteca 7 (a+)	44.39 kW	Televisión Azteca
35	9	XHSLS-TDT	San Luis Potosí	Nueve TV	27.72 kW	Gobierno de San Luis Potosí
29	10	XHSLV-TDT	San Luis Potosí	Canal 7	294.06 kW	Comunicación 2000
24	11	XHCPDJ-TDT	San Luis Potosí	Canal Once (Once Niñas y Niños)	22.52 kW	Instituto Politécnico Nacional
16	13	XHDE-TDT	San Luis Potosí	CN13	50.6 kW	Televisora Potosina
23	14	XHSPS-TDT	San Luis Potosí	Canal Catorce	20.75 kW	Sistema Público de Radiodifusión del Estado Mexicano
10	4	XHROSL-TDT	San Luis Potosí	Globalmedia TV		Radio Operadora Pegasso
21	1	XHTAZ-TDT	Tamazunchale	Azteca Uno (adn40)	5.06 kW	Televisión Azteca
29	2/5	XHTAT-TDT	Tamazunchale	Las Estrellas (Canal 5)	40 kW	Televimex
24	7	XHTZL-TDT	Tamazunchale	Azteca 7	5.05 kW	Televisión Azteca
