= NTN =

NTN may refer to:

- NTN (TV channel) (Ukrainian: НТН), Ukraine
- NTN Buzztime, an entertainment company
- NTN Corporation, bearing manufacturer
- National Television Network (Saint Lucia), a Saint Lucian television channel
- National Terminal Number
- New Telemark Norm, a type of ski binding
- Newton railway station, station code "NTN"
- Nike Team Nationals, a cross-country meet
- Normanton Airport, IATA airport code "NTN"
- Non-Terrestrial Network

== Science ==
- Netrins or NTN1, class of proteins
- Neurotactin, protein now known as CX3CL1
- Neurturin, glial protein
