= List of television stations in Baja California Sur =

The following is a list of all CRT-licensed over-the-air television stations broadcasting in the Mexican state of Baja California Sur. There are 23 television stations in Baja California Sur.

== List of television stations ==
RF	VC	Call sign	Location	Network/name	ERP	Concessionaire
27	7/1	XHBAB-TDT	Bahía Asunción	Azteca 7 (Azteca Uno)	1.06 kW	Televisión Azteca
21	7/1	XHBTB-TDT	Bahía Tortugas	Azteca 7 (Azteca Uno)	0.92 kW	Televisión Azteca
24	1	XHJCC-TDT	San José del Cabo	Azteca Uno (adn40)	13.53 kW	Televisión Azteca
27	2/5	XHSJT-TDT	San José del Cabo; Cabo San Lucas	Las Estrellas (Canal 5)	30 kW; 27 kW	Televimex
26	7	XHSJC-TDT	San José del Cabo	Azteca 7 (a+)	13.5 kW	Televisión Azteca
35	10	XHCPCS-TDT	San José del Cabo; Cabo San Lucas	TV Mar	56.09 kW; 14.29 kW	Compañía Periodística Sudcaliforniana
26	1	XHCOC-TDT	Cd. Constitución	Azteca Uno (adn40)	7.28 kW	Televisión Azteca
30	2/5	XHCBC-TDT	Cd. Constitución	Las Estrellas (Canal 5)	10 kW	Televimex
27	7	XHCCB-TDT	Cd. Constitución	Azteca 7	7.29 kW	Televisión Azteca
26	2	XHGWT-TDT	Guerrero Negro	Las Estrellas	30 kW	Televimex
24	7/1	XHGNB-TDT	Guerrero Negro	Azteca 7 (Azteca Uno)	0.89 kW	Televisión Azteca
21	1	XHAPB-TDT	La Paz	Azteca Uno (adn40)	49.91 kW	Televisión Azteca
28	2	XHLPT-TDT	La Paz	Las Estrellas (FOROtv)	26 kW	Televimex
22	3	XHCTLP-TDT	La Paz	Imagen Televisión (Excélsior TV)	100 kW	Cadena Tres I, S.A. de C.V.
29	5/9	XHLPB-TDT	La Paz	Canal 5 (Nu9ve)	26 kW	Radio Televisión
25	7	XHPBC-TDT	La Paz	Azteca 7 (a+)	29.63 kW	Televisión Azteca
30	8	XHBZC-TDT	La Paz	Canal 8	50.484 kW	Gobierno del Estado de Baja California Sur
23	10	XHCPBC-TDT	La Paz	TV Mar	112.85 kW	Compañía Periodística Sudcaliforniana
14		XHCPCK-TDT	La Paz			Instituto Politécnico Nacional
31		XHSPB-TDT	La Paz			Sistema Público de Radiodifusión del Estado Mexicano
22	7/1	XHSIB-TDT	San Ignacio	Azteca 7 (Azteca Uno)	1.08 kW	Televisión Azteca
21	7/1	XHSIS-TDT	San Isidro	Azteca 7 (Azteca Uno)	0.92 kW	Televisión Azteca
24	7/1	XHSRB-TDT	Santa Rosalía	Azteca 7 (Azteca Uno)	1.13 kW	Televisión Azteca

== Defunct stations ==
- XHK-TV 10, La Paz (1968–2015)
