= XHSPR-TDT =

SPR transmitter in Mexico City

- Mexico City; Mexico
- Channels: Digital: 30 (UHF); Virtual: 14

Programming
- Subchannels: 14.1 Canal Catorce; 14.2 @prende+; 14.3 TV Migrante

Ownership
- Owner: Sistema Público de Radiodifusión del Estado Mexicano

History
- Founded: March 31, 2010
- First air date: June 24, 2010
- Former call signs: XHOPMA-TDT (2010–2017)
- Former channel number: Virtual: 30 (2010–2016)
- Call sign meaning: Sistema Público de Radiodifusión del Estado Mexicano

Technical information
- Licensing authority: CRT
- ERP: 116.260 kW
- HAAT: 612.7 m (2,010 ft)
- Transmitter coordinates: 19°31′59.13″N 99°07′50.58″W
- Repeater: RF 30 Coacalco (500 watts)

Links
- Website: www.canalcatorce.tv

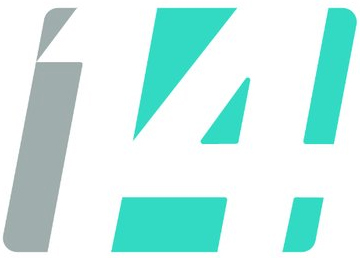

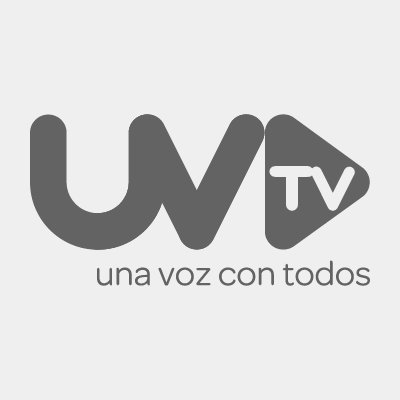

XHSPR-TDT is a television station in Mexico City, Mexico, the flagship station for the Sistema Público de Radiodifusión del Estado Mexicano (SPR) transmitter system. It broadcasts on channel 30 from a transmitter atop Cerro del Chiquihuite; its primary signal is the SPR's Canal Catorce network.

XHSPR received its permit as XHOPMA-TDT, after the original name of the SPR (Organismo Promotor de Medios Audiovisuales) and signed on in 2012. Its transmitter is located on Cerro del Chiquihuite, which is home to the majority of Mexico City's broadcast stations. Not long after, the name of the OPMA network, originally "30 TV México", was changed to "Una Voz Con Todos" to reflect that it aired on different channels in each city; the network is currently known as Canal Catorce.

The new XHSPR-TDT call sign became official on December 20, 2017.

== Subchannels ==
XHSPR's digital signal is multiplexed. This multiplex is different from that on all other SPR transmitters as it excludes Canal 11 and Canal 22 as the flagship channels of these networks service the Valley of Mexico at full power (XEIPN and XEIMT, respectively). It also broadcast TV UNAM until March 4, 2024, when UNAM received a new frequency to begin broadcasting on its own signal.

Subchannels of XHSPR-TDT
Channel	Res.	Short name	Programming
14.1	1080i	XHSPR	Canal Catorce
14.2	480i	XHSPR	@prende+
14.3	480i	XHSPR	TV Migrante

The 14.3 Subchannel use MPEG-4 Compression.
