= Tele La Brise =

Radio Tele La Brise
- Camp-Perrin, Haiti; Haiti

Programming
- Language: French

Links
- Website: telelabrise.com

Radio Télé La Brise is an educational, cultural, sports, and music Haitian radio and television station based in Camp-Perrin, Haiti. It has been licensed by Conatel since July 23, 2010.

== See also ==
- Media of Haiti
- Camp-Perrin
