= Daher Broadcasting Service =

Ownership
- Owner: Daher Broadcasting Service Limited

History
- First air date: 1989

Daher Broadcasting Service is a commercial radio and television network in the Caribbean state of Saint Lucia. The TV station broadcasts on VHF channel 10.

== History ==
DBS launched in 1985 and was founded by the Daher couple of Syrian origin. Like what happens with its competing channel HTS, DBS broadcasts entirely in English, with no airtime given for Kwéyòl, except for occasional use. On 17 December 2002, it obtained a new broadcasting license.

During the 2010s, one of its main personalities was Alex Bousquets, nicknamed Mr. Streetvibes. He died on 10 October 2021. Lissa Joseph worked at DBS since 2011, on radio and later on television. She died on 6 January 2026, aged 43.
