= Energia TV =

- Kralendijk; Bonaire
- Branding: Energia TV

History
- Founded: August 13, 2012

Energia TV is a television station in Bonaire, also available in Aruba and Curaçao on cable.

Initially known as Energia Vision, it began broadcasts on August 13, 2012 on SETAR channel 55 in Bonaire and 22 in Curaçao. The station is owned alongside its radio counterpart Radio Energia, by politician Ramonsito Booi, whose latter's broadcasts under that name were suspended on February 20, 2009.

On February 26, 2019, the channel was renamed Dutch Caribbean TV (DCTV). Under this name, the channel held the kids edition of Big Live Nature Quiz, the Bonaire speech for Mark Rutte's Chains of the Past report on 19 December 2022 (alongside NOSTV) and cabinet meetings.

The rename was made to avoid associating the station with political connotations. The current owner is Emilayla Coffi.

== See also ==
- List of Caribbean television channels
