= VM Latino =

Costa Rican music television channel

- Country: Costa Rica
- Headquarters: San Pedro, Costa Rica

Programming
- Language: Spanish

History
- Founded: 2000
- Launched: 2000

VM Latino (channel 29) is a Costa Rican music television channel established in 2000, with the acquisition of an extant UHF outlet.

It started broadcasting in the district of San Pedro. Although cable television was already viable as of the time of its launch, it was created as an urge to provide entertainment to a local audience. In 2001, the network held VM Verano, a beauty pageant in beaches and hotels. It had also gained the rights to air Prophet TV. By January 2002, the channel was made available on all cable companies of the country. One of its longtime presenters was Luis Lauretto, who left the channel in 2013. In 2002, the channel aired a program about sex.

Since 2022, the channel has been looking for a new strategy.
