= Meaningful Television =

Meaningful Television (MTV) is a private television station in Grenada. Founded in May 1997, the station operates on VHF channel 9 with a relay station on VHF channel 10, as well as on channel 18 on cable companies.

== History ==
Ria Murray started working at MTV presenting its news service in 2005.

In early March 2014, two long-running staff members, Gennil Reuben and Ria Murray, resigned, a move which was criticized by the Media Workers Association of Grenada.

On 17-18 June 2019, Solomon Mitchell raided MTV's offices. As of January 2020, Tonnia St Louis Lawrence was hired by the channel, but was resigned from MWAG.

== Programming ==
Local programming other than the news is often shared with GBN. One example is Tabanca in August 2021, which also made it to Tempo TV in the United States and the Caribbean.
