= HGPTV =

- Country: Guyana
- Broadcast area: North-eastern Guyana
- Headquarters: Beterverwagting

Programming
- Language: English
- Picture format: 480i (NTSC)

History
- Launched: 1993

Links
- Website: https://www.hgptv.com/

Availability

Terrestrial
- UHF: Channel 16

HGPTV is a Guyanese commercial television station established in 1993, founded by Terry Nelson-Fraser, best known for his nickname Omar "Halagala" Farouk. It broadcasts its over-the-air signal over UHF channel 16 in the north-eastern regions of Guyana, 4, 5 and the northern areas of 6, as well as channel 60 on cable providers.

== History ==
HGPTV started broadcasting in 1993 as a community station. Farouk was responsible for program production for many years, presenting several shows and providing voice-over work for commercials aired on the station. Among the events produced or hosted at the station's facilities in its early years were beauty pageants and manufacturer exhibitions. The station had 30,000 viewers as of February 1996.

Farouk died of a heart attack on 9 February 2009. The station had applied for the renewal of its license in 2012.
