= Teleamiga =

Teleamiga Internacional
- Country: Colombia
- Headquarters: Chapinero, Bogota, Colombia

Programming
- Picture format: HDTV 1080i (downscaled to 480i for the SD feed)

Ownership
- Owner: Teleamiga S.A.
- Key people: José Galat; Diego Arango

History
- Launched: December 12, 2001; 23 years ago

Links
- Website: http://www.teleamiga.tv

Teleamiga is a Colombian local television station, licensed by the Fundación Ictus and the La Gran Colombia University, based in Bogotá. It broadcasts family-oriented programmes, mostly with a Catholic stance.

In July 2017, the Episcopal Conference of Colombia issued an official statement against Teleamiga, in particular against its weekly program Un Café con Galat with the channel's founder and president Dr. José Galat who calls Pope Francis a "false pope", due to the involvement of the St. Gallen Group in his selection and has questioned the orthodoxy of his encyclicals. In Teleamiga's reply to the bishops' statement, Galat reiterated his position.
