= VTV (Honduras) =

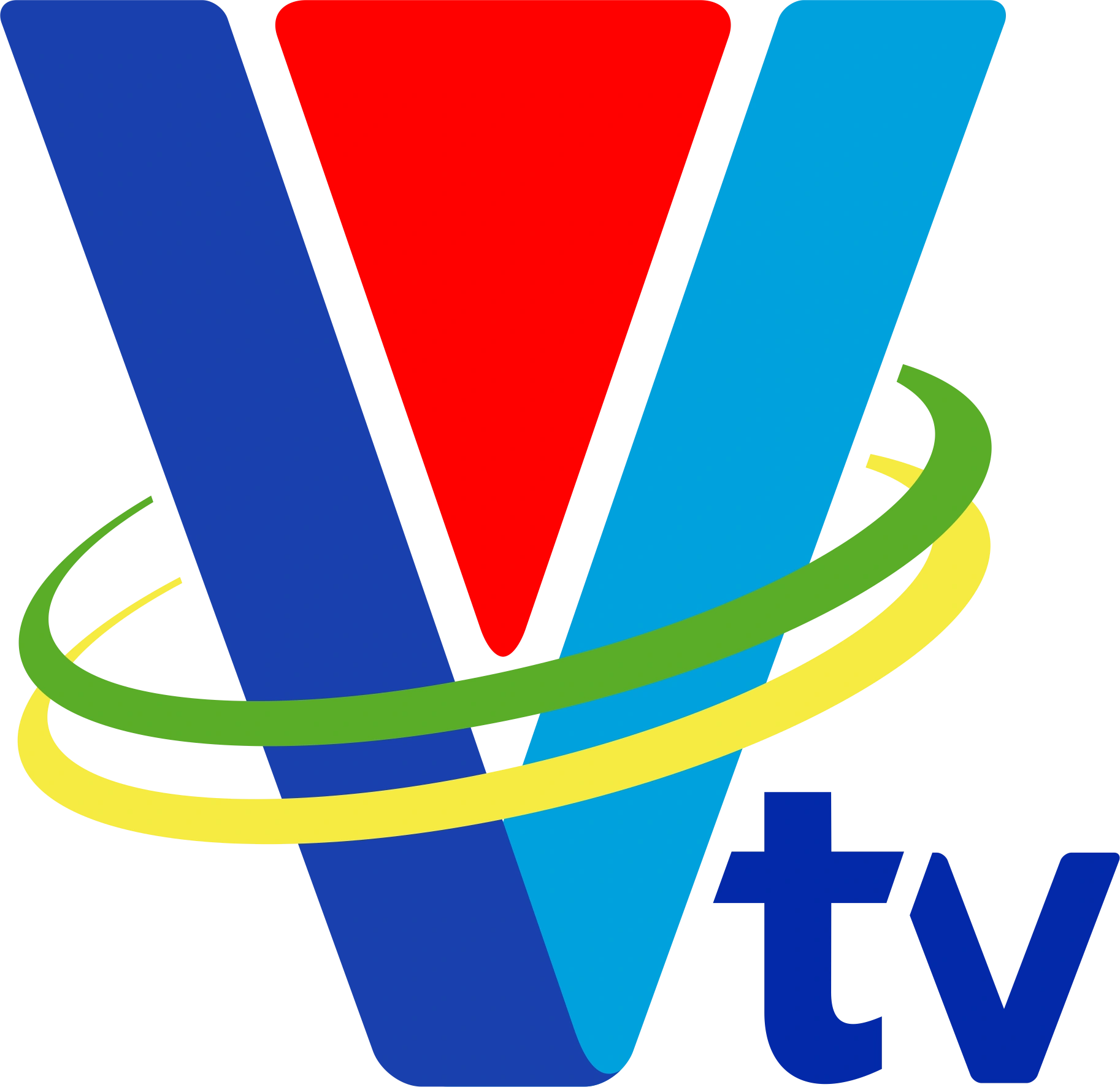
- Type: Spanish-language broadcast television network
- Country: Honduras
- Headquarters: Tegucigalpa, Honduras

Programming
- Language: Spanish
- Picture format: 1080i HDTV

Ownership
- Owner: Grupo VTV (Albavisión)

History
- Launched: March 5, 1985
- Former names: VICA Televisión (1985-2010)

Links
- Website: https://www.vtv.com.hn

Availability

Terrestrial
- Analog VHF: Channel 9 (Center Zone); Channel 2 (North Zone)

VTV (derived from the former name VICA Televisión, in turn from the former legal name of the channel, Voz e Imagen de Centroamérica) is a Honduran commercial television station owned by Remigio Ángel González's Albavisión conglomerate.

== History ==
The channel was founded in January 1985 by Jorge Sikaffy Sahuri and Mercedes Sikaffy, breaking the monopoly held by the stations that would later form Televicentro. The Sikaffy family had already owned La Voz de Centroamérica (HRVW) before, the television station by 1988 had a schedule limited to imports from the United States, Latin America and Spain. At the time, the channel was developing its news operation, when, at the time, the only news program was Hoy Mismo on Telesistema Hondureño.

In January 2009, shares of the channel were bought by the Mexican conglomerate TV Azteca, laying off eight staff members and evaluating the rest of the process in March.

The channel announced changes at the start of the 2010 FIFA World Cup, starting with an upgrade of its broadcasting equipment. After the World Cup ended the station presented a new newscast (Acción VTV) and announced further changes later in the year, without revealing them directly. By then, the channel was now owned by Albavisión. The new owners relaunched the channel as VTV on 11 October, ending the use of the Vica brand after 25 years. The new schedule was a complete change from the previous one, aimed at attracting a larger audience share, "starting from scratch", and aiming to cover all of Honduras over-the-air without relying excessively on cable networks to deliver its signal. The Albavisión management helped increase the station's advertising finances.

In 2016, VTV by means of figurehead company Eldi was submitting 46 licenses for digital terrestrial television, which also included the licenses obtained by sister company Grupo G Telecomunicaciones.
