= Atv98 =

Nicaraguan legislative TV channel

The atv98 channel (Asamblea TV), also known as Canal Parlamentario, is a cable television channel from Nicaragua, similar to C-SPAN, owned and operated by the Nicaraguan Parliament. It features live coverage of the legislative power.
