= Antigua Broadcasting Service =

State-owned broadcaster of Antigua and Barbuda

The Antigua Broadcasting Service (ABS) is the state-controlled broadcaster of Antigua and Barbuda. It operates one radio station and one television channel, the latter being the country's only channel, outside of cable.

== History ==
Radio arrived to Antigua and Barbuda in the 1940s but was limited to relays of external services, the BBC World Service and the Voice of America. At the time, few people could afford to buy a radio. ABS started radio broadcasts in June 1962, useful for disseminating emergency information.

Television started with ZAL-TV, channel 10, in 1965. A private company at the outset, it had a predominantly expatriate staff in its early years, and had an affiliation agreement with a television station in Bermuda. It also had a transmitter in Montserrat, a British overseas territory, on channel 7. In the mid-1970s, facing financial problems, ZAL-TV was acquired by ABS and subsequently nationalised. By then ABS-TV added a second transmitter in the Dutch territory of Sint-Maarten (on channel 8).

In May 2024, ABS received equipment donations from China's CMG. The deals with CMG have been scrutinised because of the PRC's regime's stance on media control, causing concern from some people. In December 2024, ABS announced the possibility of setting up a bureau in the island of Barbuda and expand the extant facilities in the island of Antigua.
