= Telenorte (TV channel) =

Nicaraguan TV channel

Telenorte Canal 35 is a television channel from Estelí, Nicaragua founded in June 1997 and broadcasting on terrestrial television at UHF 35 and on cable television at channel 48. Telenorte is owned by the journalist William Solís.

Telenorte covers the northern and northwestern departments of Nicaragua.
