= Guatevisión =

Guatemalan television channel

Logo used as of May 14, 2024

Guatevisión (an acronym of Guatemalteca and Televisión, officially known as Red Guatemalteca de Radiodifusión Sociedad Anonima) is a Guatemalan television channel operated by TVN and Librevisión and owned by Casa Editora Prensa Libre S.A., the owner of the newspaper Prensa Libre, whose headquarters is in Guatemala City.

The channel was scheduled to start on April 2, 2003 as a cable channel, but its launch was brought forward to March 21 due to the events of the war that had just started in Iraq.

Test terrestrial broadcasts of Guatevisión started on April 21, 2011. Press advertisements published on Prensa Libre proclaimed "Pronto llegará una nueva señal" without directly referring to the channel. Broadcasting on channel 25, the frequency was previously occupied by a music channel that existed in the 90s (Canal 25).
