= CVM Television =

CVM TV
- Kingston; Jamaica
- Channels: Analog: 8
- Branding: CVM

Programming
- Subchannels: CVM Plus

Ownership
- Owner: VertiCast Media Group
- Sister stations: Csport, Csport 2

History
- Founded: July 31, 1990
- First air date: March 1993

Links
- Website: https://www.cvmtv.com

CVM Television Limited (CVM TV) is a national television network in Kingston, Jamaica owned by VertiCast Media Group. The station's name is an acronym for the three original major shareholders granted the television license in 1991: Community Television Systems Limited, Videomax Limited, and Mediamix Limited.

CVM is known for broadcasting newscasts and Caribbean lifestyle & entertainment shows, as well as overseas movie and TV productions. CVM News has been one of the station's long-running programmes.

== History ==
CVM TV was granted a licence to operate in March 1991, and began providing commercial television services in March 1993.

It was reported on September 27, 2022, that CVM TV was sold to the VertiCast Media Group led by media mogul Oliver McIntosh. Oliver McIntosh had been in charge of cable sports channel Sportsmax for over two decades before forming his media company. With the ownership change, CVM TV became a sibling to VertiCast's new Csport networks that launched the same year. Later that Fall, CVM TV would broadcast the 2022 FIFA World Cup with Csport; marking the return of the FIFA World Cup to the station for the first time in a near-decade.

== List of programmes ==
=== Domestic ===
==== News ====
- CVM News

==== Sports ====
- CVM Sports

==== Breakfast ====
- Sunrise

=== International ===
==== Drama ====
- The Sopranos

==== Comedy ====
- Are You Being Served?
- Keeping Up Appearances

=== International ===
==== Drama ====
- ER
- NYPD Blue
- Picket Fences
- Silk Stalkings
- Street Justice
- The X-Files

==== Children's ====
- Abby Hatcher
- Ace Ventura: Pet Detective
- Action Man
- Adventures of the Gummi Bears
- Animaniacs
- Astro Boy
- Barney & Friends
- Beetlejuice
- Butterbean's Café
- Dora the Explorer (TV series)
- Doug
- Free Willy
- The Magic School Bus
- The Mummy
- The New Archies
- Lazer Tag Academy
- The Little Mermaid
- Merrie Melodies
- Nella the Princess Knight
- Pinky and the Brain
- Police Academy
- The Puzzle Place
- Rainbow Rangers
- Reading Rainbow
- The Real Ghostbusters
- Romeo!
- Salty's Lighthouse
- Sesame Street
- Shimmer and Shine
- Shoebox Zoo
- Space Strikers
- Sunny Day (TV series)
- Superhuman Samurai Syber-Squad
- Tak and the Power of Juju
- Taz-Mania
- Tenko and the Guardians of the Magic
- V.R. Troopers

==== Comedy ====
- The 5 Mrs. Buchanans
- Blossom
- Family Matters
- The Fresh Prince of Bel-Air
- Hangin' with Mr. Cooper
- The Jamie Foxx Show
- Married... with Children
- Step by Step
- The Upper Hand

== See also ==
- Television Jamaica (TVJ)
