= Camp-Perrin =

Camp-Perrin Kanperen
- Commune
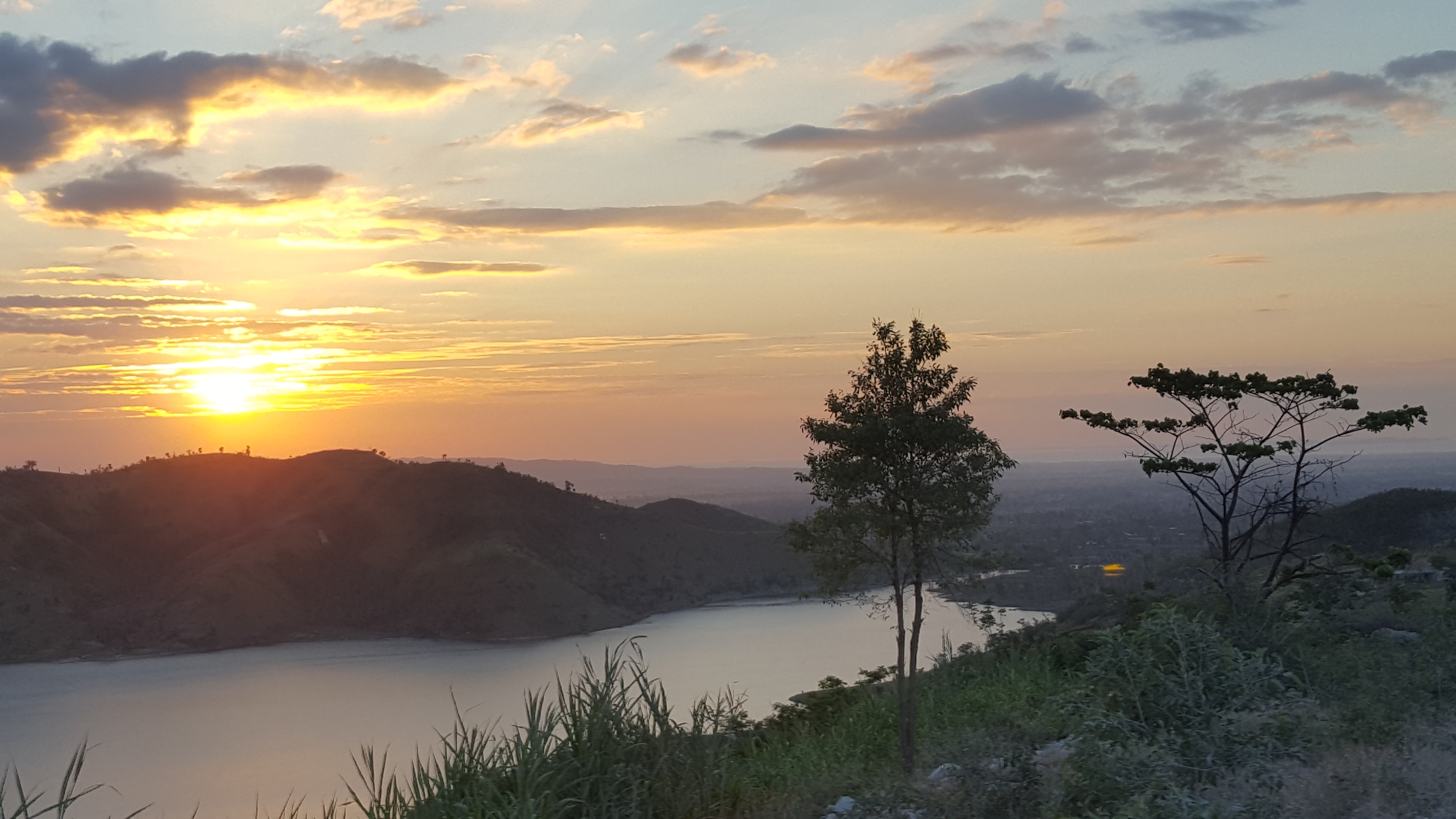
- Interactive map of Camp-Perrin
- Location in Haiti
- Coordinates: 18°19′0″N 73°52′0″W
- Country: Haiti
- Department: Sud
- Arrondissement: Les Cayes

Area
  - Total: 133.77 km^{2} (51.65 sq mi)
- Elevation: 246 m (807 ft)

Population (2015)
  - Total: 45,043
  - Density: 336.72/km^{2} (872.10/sq mi)
- Time zone: UTC−05:00 (EST)
  - Summer (DST): UTC−04:00 (EDT)
- Postal code: HT 8140

Camp-Perrin (French pronunciation: [kɑ̃ pɛʁɛ̃]; Haitian Creole: Kanperen) is a commune in the Les Cayes Arrondissement, in the Sud department of Haiti. It has 40,962 inhabitants.

== History ==
The city of Camp-Perrin was created during the eighteenth century when three Frenchmen (Colon de France), the Perrin brothers, arrived with the goal of studying the possibilities of culture of coffee, cotton and indigo, as well as the exploitation of the wood of dye as the wood of campêche in Haiti. They built a camp up the hill; thus the names of the two town districts are Bas-Camp and Haut-Camp (above and below the camp).

== Administration ==
The town is sub-divided in three counties known as:

- Champlois - Marceline as the second section
- Lévy - Mersan - As the first section
- Tibi - Davezac - As the third section

== Radio and telecommunications ==
The City of Camp-Perrin has one commercial TV station known as Tele La Brise broadcasting on television CH-28 (Canal-28) and five radio stations transmitting on the FM band:

- La Brise FM FM 104.9, (slogan : Le ROI FM, broadcast his contents from Champlois, Camp-Perrin. With an ERP of 6.0 kW, it is known as the radio with the most coverage in the area extending its coverage to the vicinity of the Sud-Est, Nippes and Grand'Anse Departments. Radio Platinum has also a significant power thus among the three most powerful radio station in Les Cayes Vicinity with Radio Macaya and Radio Tele 6 Univers
- La Brise FM - 104.9 MHz 1000 watts (ERP: 6.0 kW)
- Tele La Brise - Channel 28 - 1000 watts (ERP: 10.0 kW)
- Radio Platinum - 88.9 MHz (ERP: 500 watts)

Most of the radio stations broadcasting from la Ville des Cayes can also be heard in Camp-Perrin: They are Radio Tele 6 Univers, Radio Macaya, Radio Nami Inter, Radio Lumière, Radio Ginen. On the side of Télé La Brise, the following TV station, TNH, TMS, Tele 6 Univers have a partial coverage in Camp-Perrin.

== Economy ==
The main resource of the population is the trade of local product such as cacao, yuka, sweet potatoes, beans, corn, oranges, des feuilles de tilleuls, bananas, coffee, cayenne pepper and sugarcane.
