= Helen Television System =

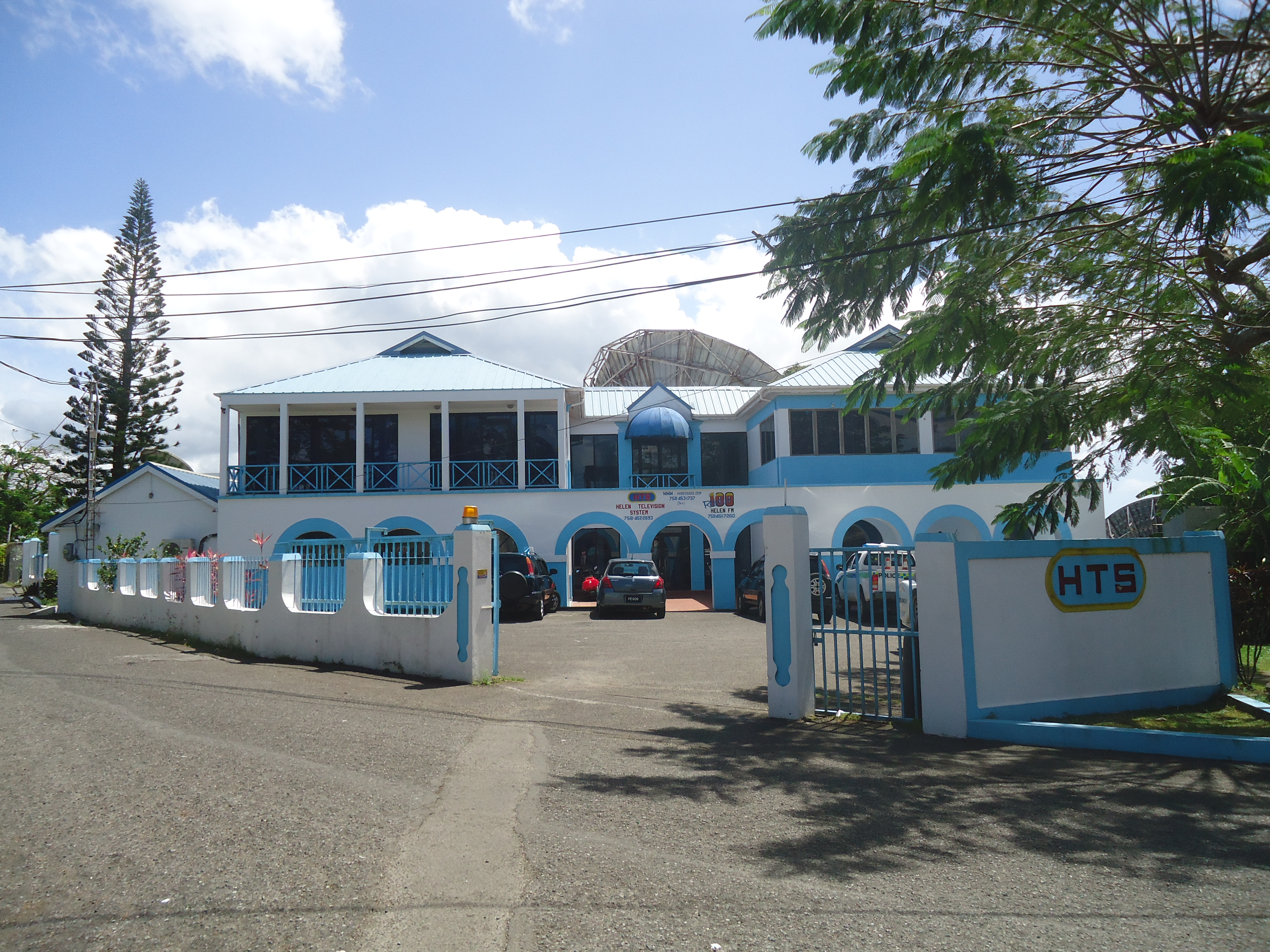
- Headquarters of Helen Television System
- Castries; Saint Lucia

Ownership
- Owner: Helen Television System

History
- First air date: December 1982

Helen Television System (channel 4) is a commercial radio and television network in the Caribbean state of Saint Lucia. The country's first television station, it is named after Saint Lucia's nickname of "Helen of the West".

== History ==
HTS started broadcasting on VHF channels 4 and 5 in December 1982, conducting test broadcasts as the first television station in Saint Lucia. The line-up consisted of a mix of local programs and American relays. As of 1990, its director was Valrie Albert.

Most of its news reports tend to be government-oriented, often using materials and images supplied by the Government Information Services. DBS broadcasts entirely in English, with no programming in Kwéyòl, except for occasional use.

Historically, DBS operated from 4pm to 11pm, in 2007, DBS expanded its lineup, running from 5am to near midnight.

== Other activities ==
As early as 2001, HTS initiated a subsidiary, Helen IT Systems, employing a staff of 600 at its local call center.
