= Maya TV =

Television station in Honduras

Maya TV, also known as Canal 66, is a television station in Honduras.
