= National Television Network (Saint Lucia) =

Saint Lucian cable television network

Ownership
- Owner: Government Information Service

History
- First air date: 14 October 2001

The National Television Network of Saint Lucia is a cable television network (channel 2) owned by the country's government. The channel broadcasts from Castries, its capital, and produces programming in English and Kweyol languages.

== History ==
Until 2001, television in Saint Lucia was dominated by networks from the United States. On 17 May 2001, the government started test broadcasts of NTN with extensive trial broadcasts starting in July. The Cabinet formally established NTN in September. Regular broadcasts started on 14 October on channel 2, which rebroadcast CNN Headline News the rest of the day.

As of 2009, NTN was broadcasting a four hour schedule from 6pm to 10pm with a repeat the following morning.
