= Teleceiba =

Teleceiba Canal 7
- Country: Honduras

Programming
- Language: Spanish

Teleceiba, also known as Canal 7, is a television station located in La Ceiba, Honduras.
