= TV UNAM =

Public TV channel of the National Autonomous University of Mexico

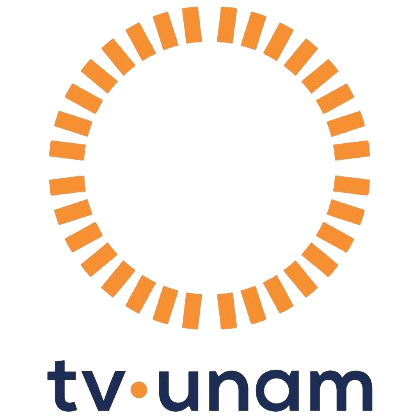
- Network: Edusat, SPR
- Headquarters: Mexico City, Mexico

Programming
- Picture format: 1080i HDTV

Ownership
- Owner: National Autonomous University of Mexico

History
- Founded: October 24, 2005

Links
- Website: tv.unam.mx

Availability

Terrestrial
- Digital terrestrial television (Mexico): Channel 20.1

TV UNAM is an educational television network owned and operated by the National Autonomous University of Mexico (UNAM) in Mexico City.

== History ==
The UNAM began broadcasts on XHUNAM-TV analog channel 60 on December 5, 2000, in Mexico City in order to pave the way for their own television network. It broadcast for five years before being renewed in 2005 as a digital-only station, the first in Mexico.

Since October 24, 2005, TV UNAM has operated continuously. The network was originally known as TEVE UNAM and broadcast on analog Channel 60 (UHF) in the Ciudad Universitaria area of Mexico City, as well as on paid television providers, including Cablevisión in central Mexico and Sky TV. In 2016, it rebranded as TV UNAM and expanded its coverage to other cities across Mexico. Its programming includes a wide range of content, such as documentaries, live debates, television series, and analysis programs.

With the help of the government-owned OPMA public television network (now Sistema Público de Radiodifusión del Estado Mexicano (SPR)), it expanded its coverage as an over-the-air digital subchannel. TV UNAM is generally on the air daily from 8am to as early as midnight (longer on some nights, especially if there is a movie or concert scheduled).

Although XHUNAM-TDT continues to operate on digital channel 20 in Mexico City, it has largely been used for experimental transmissions and does not broadcast the programming of TV UNAM to 2017. SPR's Mexico City station XHSPR-TDT carries it on channel 20.1 to March 2024.

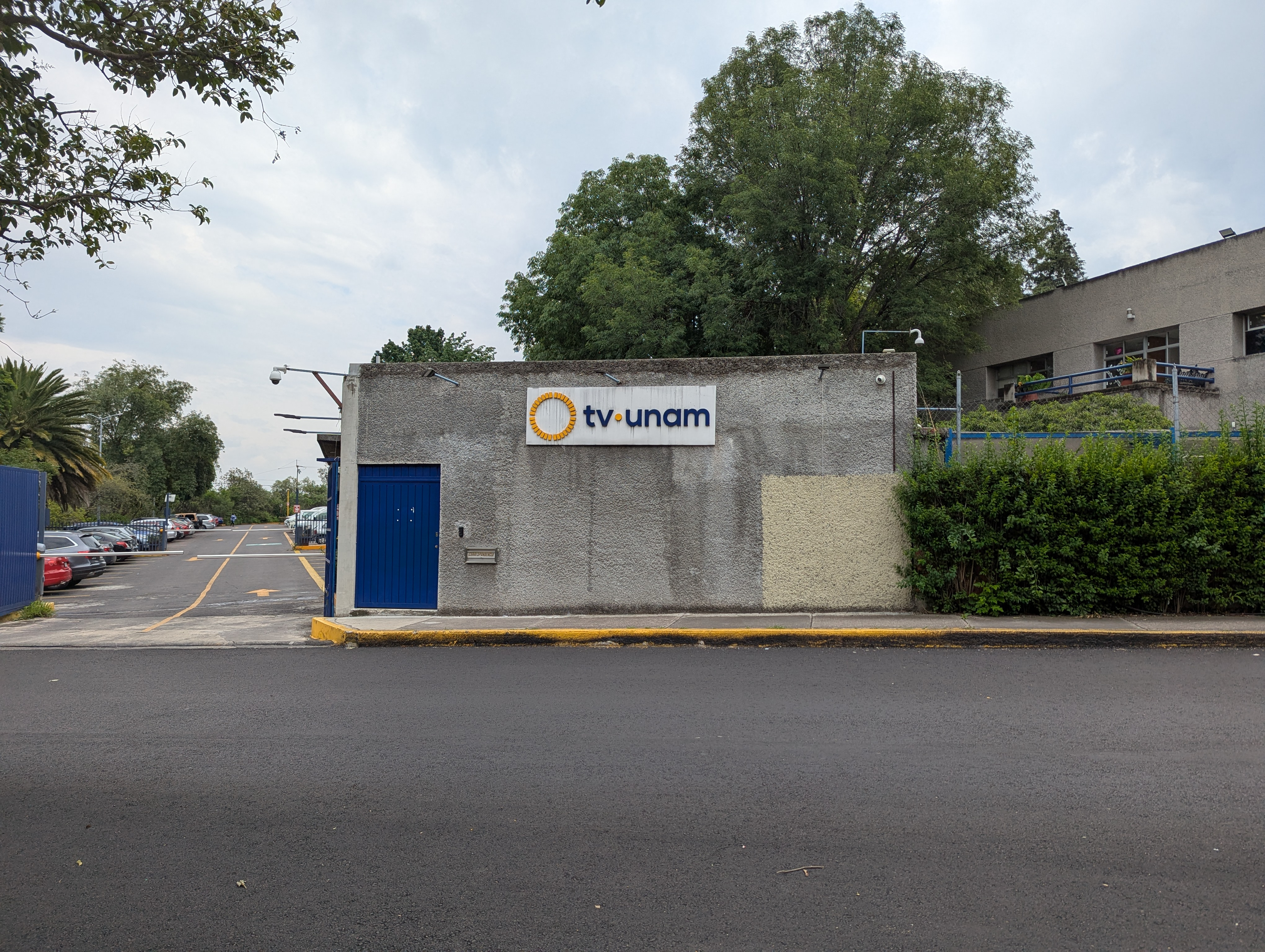
TV UNAM headquarters in University City, Mexico City

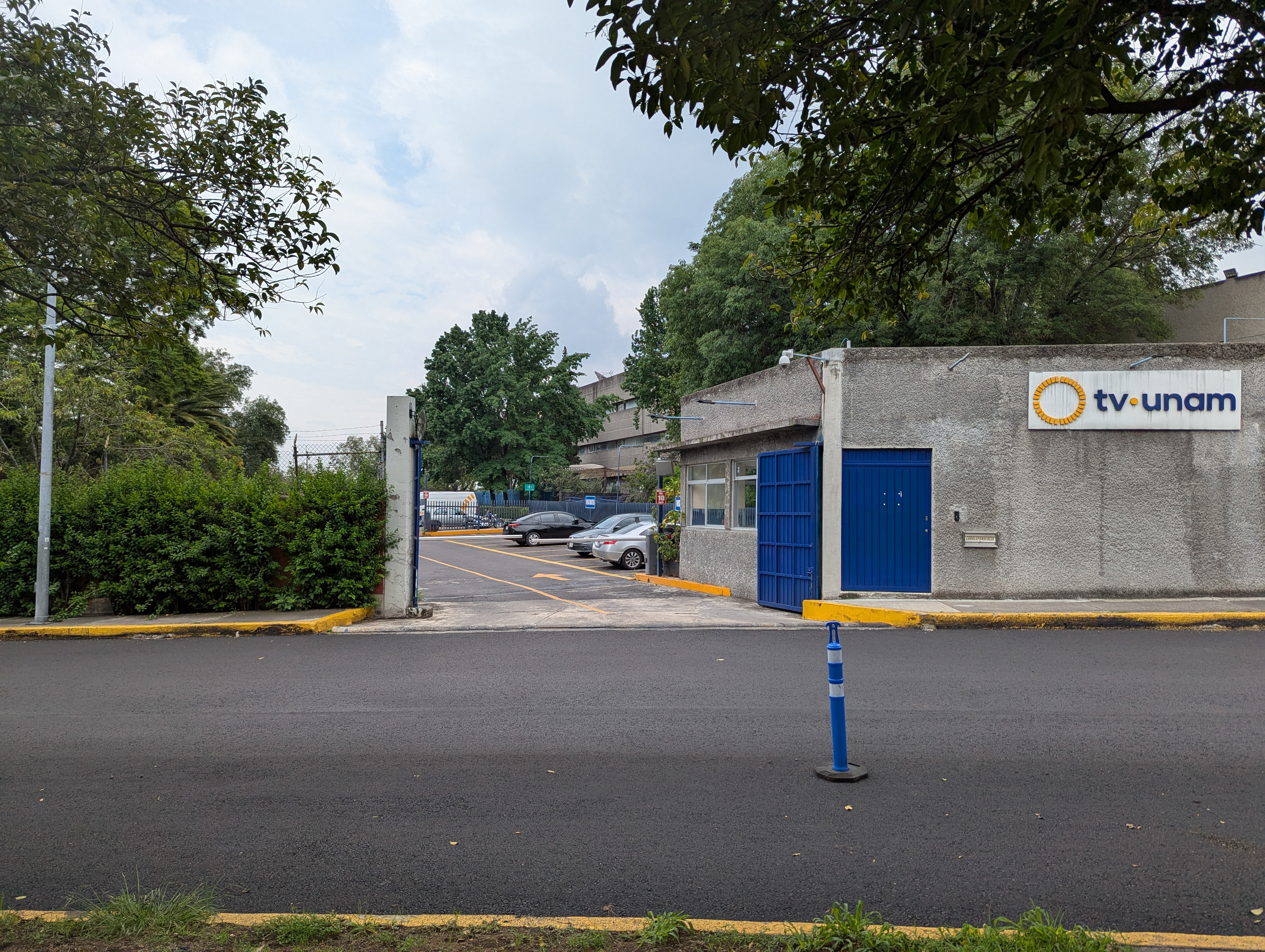
TV UNAM headquarters in University City, Mexico City

Programming on TV UNAM generally consists of educational telecourse programs for UNAM students, plus public affairs, documentary and cultural programming. Some TV UNAM programming can also be seen on the nationwide Edusat service.

All of its original programming is also available on Youtube, with the exceptions of licensed content, which is only available on TV and the website

== Transmitters ==
Channel	Call sign	Location
11	XHUNAM-TDT	Mexico City
15	XHSPRAG-TDT	Aguascalientes, Aguascalientes
32	XHSPRCC-TDT	San Francisco de Campeche, Campeche
18	XHSPRSC-TDT	San Cristóbal de las Casas, Chiapas
26	XHSPRTP-TDT	Tapachula, Chiapas
31	XHSPRTC-TDT	Tuxtla Gutiérrez, Chiapas
21	XHSPRCO-TDT	Colima, Colima
20	XHSPRCE-TDT	Celaya, Guanajuato
34	XHSPRLA-TDT	León, Guanajuato
20	XHSPRGA-TDT	Guadalajara, Jalisco
30	XHSPREM-TDT	Toluca, México
19	XHSPRMO-TDT	Morelia, Michoacán
14	XHSPRUM-TDT	Uruapan, Michoacán
16	XHSPRMT-TDT	Monterrey, Nuevo León
35	XHSPROA-TDT	Oaxaca de Juárez, Oaxaca
30	XHSPRPA-TDT	Puebla de Zaragoza, Puebla
30	XHSPRMQ-TDT	Santiago de Querétaro, Querétaro
29	XHSPRMS-TDT	Mazatlán, Sinaloa
31	XHSPROS-TDT	Ciudad Obregón, Sonora
27	XHSPRHA-TDT	Hermosillo, Sonora
25	XHSPRVT-TDT	Villahermosa, Tabasco
35	XHSPRTA-TDT	Tampico, Tamaulipas
26	XHSPRCA-TDT	Coatzacoalcos, Veracruz
35	XHSPRXA-TDT	Xalapa-Enríquez, Veracruz
23	XHSPRME-TDT	Mérida, Yucatán
15	XHSPRZC-TDT	Zacatecas, Zacatecas
