= Canal Catorce =

Mexican public TV network

- Logo Used Since 2023
- Type: Terrestrial television network
- Country: Mexico
- Transmitters: See SPR transmitters

Programming
- Language: Spanish
- Picture format: 1080i HDTV (downscaled to 480i for the SD feed)

Ownership
- Owner: Sistema Público de Radiodifusión del Estado Mexicano

History
- Launched: 11 March 2012; 14 years ago
- Former names: Una Voz con Todos (2010-2017)

Links
- Website: canalcatorce.tv

Availability

Terrestrial
- Digital terrestrial television (except Ciudad Juarez): Channel 14
- Digital terrestrial television (Ciudad Juarez): Channel 16

Canal Catorce (Channel 14, formerly known as Una Voz con Todos) is a national public television network of Mexico, operated by the Sistema Público de Radiodifusión del Estado Mexicano (SPR). It began operations in 2012 and is distributed via the SPR's national digital transmitter network, as well as on all cable and satellite providers. It is based in Mexico City.

== History ==
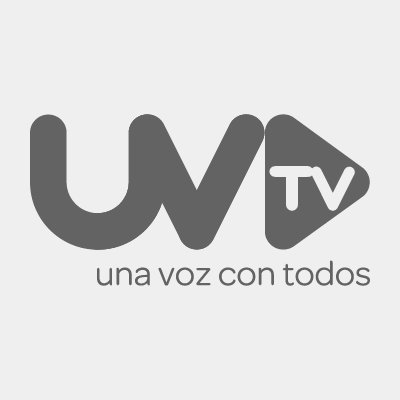
Last logo as "Una Voz con Todos" from 2016-2017. During transmissions and advertising sports, the logo transformed into the number 14.

The Organismo Promotor de Medios Audiovisuales, or OPMA, was the predecessor to the SPR. It was founded with the aim of extending the breadth and depth of public television in Mexico. Two national-level public television stations were already on the air — XEIPN-TV, established in 1959, and Canal 22, established as public/cultural in 1993 — but they were not available outside Mexico City except through pay television and select programs carried by the public television stations in the various states, as well as Canal Once's few existing retransmitters. Outside Mexico City, XEIPN had a national penetration of 28%, and XEIMT had 22% reach. Furthermore, in 2005, the teveunam network (not to be confused with XHUNAM-TDT) owned by the National Autonomous University of Mexico (UNAM) began its broadcast as a Pay TV-only channel.

On March 31, 2010, an official decree published in the Official Gazette of Mexico created OPMA. OPMA created a new public television channel, initially called Canal 30 TV México, to serve as its flagship programming source. Initially, OPMA's first transmitters outside Mexico City

The first four transmitters for the system began operations in 2010. The Mexico City transmitter, XHOPMA-TDT (now XHSPR-TDT) channel 30, launched on March 23, 2012. With this new transmitter, the Canal 30 network launched. The name was changed to Una Voz con Todos in 2012 to reflect that outside Mexico City, it was usually on other channel numbers.

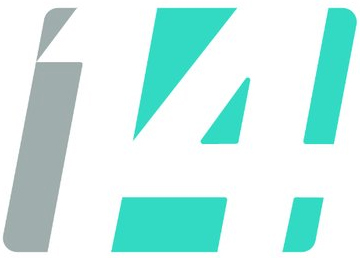
First logo as "Canal Catorce" from 2017-2020

In October 2016, all SPR transmitters were assigned virtual channel 14 for Una Voz con Todos; as a result, cable providers, who are required to carry the channel, placed it on channel 14. On November 13, 2017, the name of the channel was changed to Canal Catorce (Channel 14) to reflect its over-the-air and cable channel position.

== Programming ==
Programming on Canal Catorce is largely of a cultural and educational nature with the aim of strengthening democratic values in Mexican society.

In 2019, the SPR and Canal Catorce for the first time took the lead in producing coverage of Independence Day events, which were aired on all Mexican television stations. In 2022 the networks returned to providing their own commentary and camera teams while the broadcast of the main audio track of the parade on September 16 was cut to just on Channels 14 and 11, as well as on Canal del Congreso.

=== Sports ===
In January 2014, Una Voz con Todos acquired the rights to broadcast the 2014 Winter Olympics and Paralympics through a contract made between SEGOB and América Móvil. Later that year, the SPR followed up by signing a deal with the same company to carry the 2014 Youth Summer Olympics and the 2016 Summer Olympics. Una Voz Con Todos produced independent coverage of the event along with other public broadcasters. Since then Channel 14 thus has been serving as Mexico's principal home of Olympics coverage co-shared with Channel 11.

== Transmitters ==
Since October 27, 2016, all SPR transmitters carry the network on virtual channel 14.1.

In August 2017, the SPR began broadcasting Canal Catorce to the state of Morelos via a subchannel of IPN-operated Canal Once transmitter XHCIP-TDT, also using virtual channel 14.1.

Channel	Call sign	Location
30	XHSPR-TDT	Mexico City; Coacalco, Mexico
15	XHSPRAG-TDT	Aguascalientes, Aguascalientes
14	XHCPAH-TDT	Ensenada, Baja California
7	XHCPAO-TDT	Mexicali, Baja California
9	XHCPAT-TDT	Tijuana, Baja California
31	XHSPB-TDT	La Paz, Baja California Sur
32	XHSPRCC-TDT	San Francisco de Campeche, Campeche
18	XHSPRSC-TDT	San Cristóbal de las Casas, Chiapas
26	XHSPRTP-TDT	Tapachula, Chiapas
31	XHSPRTC-TDT	Tuxtla Gutiérrez, Chiapas
8	XHCPAU-TDT	Chihuahua, Chihuahua
18	XHCPAV-TDT	Ciudad Cuauhtémoc, Chihuahua
17	XHCPAW-TDT	Ciudad Delicias, Chihuahua
8	XHCPCN-TDT	Ciudad Juárez, Chihuahua
10	XHCPAY-TDT	Saltillo, Coahuila
21	XHSPRCO-TDT	Colima, Colima
9	XHCPCP-TDT	Manzanillo, Colima
22	XHSPO-TDT	Gómez Palacio, Durango; Torreón, Coahuila
12	XHCPBJ-TDT	Victoria de Durango, Durango
20	XHSPRCE-TDT	Celaya, Guanajuato
34	XHSPRLA-TDT	León, Guanajuato
30	XHSPG-TDT	Acapulco, Guerrero
15	XHCPCQ-TDT	Chilpancingo, Guerrero
10	XHCPCR-TDT	Tulancingo, Hidalgo
20	XHSPRGA-TDT	Guadalajara, Jalisco
30	XHSPREM-TDT	Toluca, Mexico
9	XHCPCU-TDT	Lázaro Cárdenas, Michoacán
19	XHSPRMO-TDT	Morelia, Michoacán
14	XHSPRUM-TDT	Uruapan, Michoacán
34	XHSPY-TDT	Tepic, Nayarit
5	XHCPCV-TDT	Nuevo Vallarta, Nayarit
16	XHSPRMT-TDT	Monterrey, Nuevo León
35	XHSPROA-TDT	Oaxaca de Juárez, Oaxaca
30	XHSPRPA-TDT	Puebla de Zaragoza, Puebla
30	XHSPRMQ-TDT	Santiago de Querétaro, Querétaro
29	XHSPQ-TDT	Cancún, Quintana Roo
23	XHSPS-TDT	San Luis Potosí, San Luis Potosí
12	XHCPCX-TDT	Ciudad Valles, San Luis Potosí
19	XHCPBU-TDT	Culiacán, Sinaloa
34	XHCPBV-TDT	Los Mochis, Sinaloa
29	XHSPRMS-TDT	Mazatlán, Sinaloa
31	XHSPROS-TDT	Ciudad Obregón, Sonora
27	XHSPRHA-TDT	Hermosillo, Sonora
12	XHCPDA-TDT	Guaymas, Sonora
25	XHSPRVT-TDT	Villahermosa, Tabasco
12	XHCPBD-TDT	Ciudad Victoria, Tamaulipas
7	XHCPCE-TDT	Reynosa, Tamaulipas
35	XHSPRTA-TDT	Tampico, Tamaulipas
26	XHSPRCA-TDT	Coatzacoalcos, Veracruz
19	XHCPDD-TDT	San Andres Tuxtla, Veracruz
35	XHSPRXA-TDT	Xalapa-Enríquez, Veracruz
23	XHSPRME-TDT	Mérida, Yucatán
15	XHSPRZC-TDT	Zacatecas, Zacatecas
