= XEIMT-TDT =

Mexican public TV channel and Mexico City station

- Mexico City; Mexico
- Channels: Digital: 23 (UHF); Virtual: 22
- Branding: Canal 22

Programming
- Subchannels: 22.1: Canal 22; 22.2: MX Nuestro Cine

Ownership
- Owner: Secretariat of Culture; (Televisión Metropolitana, S.A. de C.V.)

History
- Founded: 15 April 1982
- Former call signs: XHTRM-TV (1982–1983); XEIMT-TV (1983–2015)
- Former channel numbers: Analog: 22 (UHF, 1982–2015)
- Former affiliations: Imevision (1982–1990); Independent (1990–1993)
- Call sign meaning: Instituto Mexicano de la Televisión

Technical information
- Licensing authority: CRT
- ERP: 116.49 kW
- HAAT: 342.4 m (1,123 ft)
- Transmitter coordinates: 19°31′57″N 99°07′51″W

Links
- Website: http://www.canal22.org.mx/

XEIMT-TDT (channel 22), known as Canal 22, is a television station in Mexico City, Mexico. Broadcasting on channel 22, XEIMT is owned by Televisión Metropolitana, S.A. de C.V., and operated by the Secretariat of Culture. It is one of Mexico's principal public television stations, with a format emphasizing cultural programming.

Canal 22 is carried on all Mexican cable systems, on 25 SPR transmitters outside Mexico City, and as an international feed on some cable systems and DirecTV Stream in the United States, Spain, Latin America and the Caribbean.

== History ==
Channel 22, Mexico City's first UHF station, signed on April 15, 1982, as XHTRM-TV, the principal station of Televisión de la República Mexicana (TRM). It was the first new television station in Mexico City since 1968, when channels 8 (XHTM, operated by Televisión Independiente de México) and 13 (XHDF-TV, which was nationalized in 1972) went on the air. In 1983, TRM was absorbed into a new state broadcaster, the Instituto Mexicano de la Televisión.

In 1985, Instituto Mexicano de la Televisión took on the name Imevisión. All of the TRM repeater stations that had been constructed and relayed channel 22 were linked to Mexico City's newest television station, XHIMT-TV channel 7. From XHIMT and XHDF, two new national networks, known as Red Nacional 7 and Red Nacional 13, were formed, and Mexico City's channel 22 was opened up to broadcast local programs. The station became known as Cine Canal 22, changing its callsign to XEIMT-TV, and introduced a programming schedule focused on movies.

However, Canal 22 faced several uphill battles. As it was the first UHF station in the area, not all televisions could receive it, and its transmitter in Ajusco did not offer enough power or height to cover the city. By the start of the 1990s, Imevisión was in rough shape. In September 1990, XEIMT and XHIMT began simulcasting XHDF for the entirety of the broadcast day. In January 1991, it was announced that channels 7 and 22 would be broken off from Imevisión. Many in the Mexican cultural scene urged the government to convert one of the channels into a state-run cultural television station, a proposal accepted by the government months after.

XEIMT ended its relationship with Imevisión in December 1991, leaving the air. The next year, the government announced the sale of the remainder of Imevisión, including the 7 and 13 networks; Televisión Azteca would buy both networks, creating its Azteca 7 and Azteca 13 networks from their infrastructure.

In March 1993, XEIMT returned to air with test signals from a new transmitter location, Cerro del Chiquihuite, which offered vastly improved coverage of the Mexico City area. On June 23, 1993, with an address from President Carlos Salinas de Gortari, Canal 22 officially reopened under the auspices of Conaculta (the National Council for Culture and the Arts) and concessionaire Televisión Metropolitana. (XEIMT operates under a commercial concession and is one of three noncommercial television stations in Mexico to do so.)

In 2001, Enrique Strauss, a highly regarded figure in the production of cultural television in Mexico, became the new director general of the station. Under Strauss, new infrastructure and programming were rolled out, improving the channel's quality.

Jorge Volpi was its president from 2007 to 2012. During this period, the network accelerated its digitization process, while also granting two subchannels (22.2 and 22.3); on the programming side, Volpi himself was responsible for 221 new programs. In March 2009, Canal 22 started its social media profiles.

On December 12, 2011, the channel premiered a children's programming block for the first time. The block, named Clic Clac, features mostly European animated and live-action series as well as cultural segments produced by the channel.

In 2015, Conaculta was transformed into the Secretariat of Culture, a larger agency. At the same time, it acquired control of Radio Educación, which had previously been part of the SEP.

In 2016, Canal 22, Canal Once and Una Voz con Todos, along with the state networks, shared the broadcasting rights to the 2016 Summer Olympics, which aired exclusively on public television.

== Terrestrial television ==
On digital terrestrial television, the station broadcasts on physical channel 23 UHF and employs virtual channel 22.1. On 17 December 2015, XEIMT's terrestrial analog broadcasts were shut down as part of the analog switch-off in Mexico City.

With the creation of the Organismo Promotor de Medios Audiovisuales (now known as the Sistema Público de Radiodifusión del Estado Mexicano), a government agency formerly under the auspices of the Secretariat of the Interior, Channel 22's coverage has been significantly expanded outside Mexico City via the SPR transmitter network, which has a geographical coverage of 66%. All SPR transmitters (except Mexico City) carry XEIMT as channel 22.1. XEIMT is also available in the United States in both standard- and high-definition feeds through several pay-TV providers.

The virtual subchannel 22.2 formerly carried the so-called "national feed", which differs from the main feed in that it skips local political advertisements and certain programming aimed for other cities. This nearly made it a simulcast feed of channel 22.1 for several years. In August 2016, the channel revamped channel 22.2's feed with a completely different programming schedule. It is currently available only in the Mexico City area; it features a similar cultural-centred programming schedule as that of the main feed, featuring new shows, delayed reruns and more movies, unlike Once Niños, which features children's programming only. On 5 December 2016, Channel 22.2 was made a must-carry channel for Mexican pay television providers.

=== Subchannels ===
Subchannels of XEIMT-TDT
Channel	Res.	Short name	Programming
22.1	1080i	XEIMT.1	Canal 22 (main feed)
22.2	480i	XEIMT.2	MX Nuestro Cine

From 2016 to 2019, Canal 22.2 was broadcast in HD using MPEG-4 (ATSC A/72) video encoding, which is not compatible with all television sets. This allowed it to be sent at a bitrate of 6 Mb/s instead of the 10 Mb/s minimum required by IFT multiplexing and technical guidelines for an MPEG-2-encoded HD subchannel. As of 1 March 2019, the second subchannel broadcasts in the more-common MPEG-2 encoding standard at 480i.
