= Excélsior TV =

Mexican cable news TV channel

Excélsior TV / Imagen Multicast
- Country: Mexico
- Broadcast area: Mexico

Programming
- Language: Spanish
- Picture format: 480i SDTV

Ownership
- Owner: Grupo Imagen
- Sister channels: Imagen Televisión

History
- Launched: September 2, 2013

Availability

Terrestrial
- Digital terrestrial television (Mexico): Channel 3.4 (See transmitter list)

Excélsior TV is a Mexican FTA news channel owned by Grupo Imagen. It is named for Imagen's Excélsior newspaper and also uses the resources of Grupo Imagen's radio stations and its Imagen Televisión national network.

== History ==
Excélsior TV was launched on September 2, 2013. In addition to cable carriage, it was placed on the 27.2 subchannel of XHTRES-TDT, Imagen's existing Mexico City TV station.

When Imagen shut down cadenatres in October 2015, Excélsior TV moved from 27.2 to 27.1. Coinciding with the move was a general relaunch of the channel and the migration of the cadenatres news personalities to Excélsior TV.

In October 2017, Imagen began transmission of Excélsior TV on 38 Imagen Televisión transmitters, as subchannel 3.4.

In late January 2020, rumors began to swirl that Excélsior TV would be shuttered and that XHTRES would be rented out to El Heraldo de México newspaper to launch a TV channel. (The year before, Imagen had sold the newspaper two radio stations to launch a radio network.) On February 1, 2020, this agreement was confirmed, and Heraldo TV launched on February 10.[18] At the same time, XHTRES moved to virtual channel 10. Outside of Mexico City, where Excélsior TV was a subchannel of Imagen TV transmitters, the programming was replaced with "Imagen Multicast", primarily featuring simulcasts of XEDA-FM programming, retaining the network ID.

== Programming ==
Excelsior TV transmits news and debate programming and transmits content with the Imagen Radio platform.

== Broadcast transmitters ==
Broadcast coverage is supplied through the Imagen Televisión transmitter network. Excélsior TV was carried on its own TV station, XHTRES-TDT, in the Mexico City area until that station was leased in 2020.
