= A Más =

Mexican regionalized television service

- Country: Mexico
- Transmitters: See below

Programming
- Picture format: 480i SDTV

Ownership
- Owner: TV Azteca
- Sister channels: Azteca Uno; Azteca 7; ADN Noticias

History
- Launched: 20 March 2017; 9 years ago

Links
- Website: www.amastv.com

Availability

Terrestrial
- Digital terrestrial television (except Tijuana, Cíudad Juarez and Mexicali): Channel 7.2
- Digital terrestrial television (Mexicali and Cíudad Juarez): Channel 20.2
- Digital terrestrial television (Tijuana): Channel 21.2

A Más (originally "a+" from 2017 to 2021) (stylized: a más_{+}) is a national television network in Mexico operated by TV Azteca. It launched in five cities on March 20, 2017, and it expanded to 34 additional cities on April 7, 2017.

A Más is broadcast as the second digital subchannel (usually 7.2) of the Azteca 7 transmitters in each area. It was originally launched to provide increased regional programming, although it eventually changed its programming focus to air classic Mexican films as well as reruns of scripted productions both from TV Azteca and other providers.

== History ==
=== Regional programming on TV Azteca prior to a+ ===
From the privatization of Imevisión in 1993, the new Televisión Azteca immediately began seeking alliances with content partners to provide local and regional news and programming for air on its networks. In 1995, TV Azteca took on Síntesis, a successful local newscast in Tijuana, as a partner after Síntesis had been forced off of its previous broadcast home. In the state of Veracruz, it set up Veravisión, and it also established local news and programming operations in other cities including Mérida and San Luis Potosí. While many of these produced few programs outside of local news and were later subsumed into TV Azteca itself, Azteca Noreste, the division in Monterrey, remained a high-volume program producer, airing local Info 7 newscasts seven days a week in the morning and early afternoon as well as locally produced entertainment and sports shows.

=== Launch of a+ ===
Former a+ logo

a+ was announced on March 13, 2017, coinciding with the relaunch of Proyecto 40 as adn40 that same day. On March 8, the Federal Telecommunications Institute approved the change in program identity, as well as multiplexing of additional transmitters to provide the a+ service.

The service began operation in five cities—Mexico City, Monterrey, Guadalajara, Toluca and León—while expansion to 21 additional cities was initially planned by the end of the second quarter of 2017 and a third expansion phase slated for the second half of the year, 35 transmitters serving 34 cities were authorized for the service on March 22, 2017, with programs beginning on April 7, 2017; in August 2017, TV Azteca was further cleared to add a+ to 11 Azteca 7 transmitters, mainly in northeastern Mexico. The goal of the channel is to be a national service with programming tailored to the viewing preferences and needs of each local area. Programming for the a+ channels was developed in consultation with local businessmen and influencers in each area, through focus groups headed by Ninfa Salinas, sister of TV Azteca director general Benjamín Salinas.

Efrén Páez, an economic analyst with Mediatelecom, told Expansión that "although there have always been local stations, public and private, none of them have had the capital and resources of TV Azteca".

On December 13, 2017, the IFT deemed that with coverage of 60% of the population of Mexico, carriage of a+ should be made mandatory for satellite providers. Subsequently, under the control of Mauro Manuel Castillejos, its coverage area expanded to at least 80% of Mexico. In 2020, the channel was available to 30 million households, for a potential audience of 83 million viewers.

=== 2021 relaunch ===
The network relaunched and changed its name from a+ to A Más, in part because of its increased national-level identity.

== Programming ==
a+ initially featured a program schedule including a mix of national and regional programs. The base national program schedule that is "100% blockable" for locally produced programs in the different cities where it is broadcast. All a+ areas at launched offer a 9pm local newscast and 10pm local sports program. Depending on the size of the city, local production would vary across the different a+ channels.

a+ also carried non-local programs, such as music videos from Exa TV and cartoons from Mondo TV, as well as rebroadcasts of some of TV Azteca's more popular shows, including Venga la alegría and Ventaneando. This content became the primary focus of the channel as early as 2018. By 2024, the network had cancelled most of its original programming and would refocus into being a rerun farm composed by blocks of classic Mexican films and past scripted productions both from TV Azteca and other providers, with also occasional sports broadcasts.

== Transmitters ==
a+ is available on 54 transmitters. In each of them, it is available as the second subchannel (usually 7.2) of the Azteca 7 transmitter. In Tijuana, Mexicali and Ciudad Juárez, Azteca 7 does not have virtual channel 7 and so it is carried as virtual channel 20.2, 21.2 and 20.2, respectively.

RF	VC	Call sign	Location	ERP
29	7	XHLGA-TDT	Aguascalientes, Ags.	15.91 kW
20	7	XHENT-TDT	Ensenada, BC	29.14 kW
25	20	XHEXT-TDT	Mexicali, BC	66.22 kW
29	21	XHTIT-TDT	Tijuana, BC	148.08 kW
25	7	XHPBC-TDT	La Paz, BCS	29.63 kW
26	7	XHSJC-TDT	San José del Cabo, BCS	13.5 kW
24	7	XHCAM-TDT	Campeche, Camp.	20.46 kW
21	7	XHECH-TDT	Chihuahua, Chih.	44.43 kW
36	20	XHCJH-TDT	Cd. Juárez, Chih.	52 kW
39	7	XHCSA-TDT	San Cristóbal de las Casas, Chis. Tuxtla Gutiérrez	46.29 kW; 58.47 kW
36	7	XHJU-TDT	Tapachula	51.08 kW
24	7	XHIMT-TDT	Mexico City	464.42 kW
27	7	XHMLA-TDT	Monclova, Coah.	11.66 kW
32	7	XHPNG-TDT	Piedras Negras, Coah.	16.33 kW
33	7	XHLLO-TDT	Saltillo, Coah.	8.74 kW
43	7	XHGZP-TDT	Torreón, Coah.	187.38 kW
40	7	XHCOL-TDT	Colima, Col.	24.25 kW
50	7	XHTCO-TDT	Tecomán, Col.	4.29 kW
32	7	XHDRG-TDT	Durango, Dgo.	12.7 kW
41/14	7	XHCCG-TDT	León, Gto. (Note: XHCCG's primary transmitter is located in Celaya, but the production center is in León.)	99.33 kW
45	7	XHACC-TDT	Acapulco, Gro.	36.6 kW
28	7	XHCHL-TDT	Chilpancingo, Gro.	17.58 kW
36	7	XHPHG-TDT	Pachuca, Hgo.	3.97 kW
31	7	XHSFJ-TDT	Guadalajara, Jal.	109.44 kW
23	7	XHPVJ-TDT	Puerto Vallarta, Jal.	18.42 kW
35	7	XHLUC-TDT	Toluca, Mex.	92.02 kW
32	7	XHBUR-TDT	Morelia, Mich.	257.89 kW
23	7	XHRAM-TDT	Zamora, Mich.	30.85 kW
43	7	XHCUV-TDT	Cuernavaca, Mor.	238.21 kW
31	7	XHLBN-TDT	Tepic, Nay.	23.970 kW
17	7	XHFN-TDT	Monterrey, NL	342.070 kW
30	7	XHPSO-TDT	Matías Romero, Oax. (Cerro Palma Sola)	47.63 kW
27	7	XHOXX-TDT	Oaxaca, Oax.	57.91 kW
40	7	XHTHP-TDT	Tehuacán, Pue.	17.08 kW
34	7	XHQUE-TDT	Querétaro, Qro.	298.85 kW
28	7	XHCCQ-TDT	Cancún, Q. Roo	38.74 kW
26	7	XHCQO-TDT	Chetumal, Q. Roo	8.52 kW
22	7	XHCLP-TDT	San Luis Potosí, SLP	44.39 kW
35	7	XHDO-TDT	Culiacán, Sin.	36.52 kW
31	7	XHMIS-TDT	Los Mochis, Sin.	45.21 kW
31	7	XHDL-TDT	Mazatlán, Sin.	38.52 kW
35	7	XHBK-TDT	Cd. Obregón, Son.	45.75 kW
30	7	XHHO-TDT	Hermosillo, Son.	39.43 kW
41	7	XHVIH-TDT	Villahermosa, Tab.	18.88 kW
29	7	XHCDT-TDT	Cd. Victoria, Tamps.	16.92 kW
33	7	XHOR-TDT	Matamoros, Tamps. Reynosa, Tamps.	116.96 kW; 61.447 kW
33	7	XHLAT-TDT	Nuevo Laredo, Tamps.	119 kW
21	7	XHTAU-TDT	Tampico, Tamps.	30.54 kW
45	7	XHCTZ-TDT	Coatzacoalcos, Ver.	50.4 kW
32	7	XHSTE-TDT	Santiago Tuxtla, Ver.	15.18 kW
33	7	XHCPE-TDT (Note: XHCPE's transmitter is on Cofre de Perote, but TV Azteca's production center is in the port of Veracruz.)	Cofre de Perote, Ver.	239.16 kW
33	7	XHMEY-TDT	Mérida, Yuc.	97.708 kW
48	7	XHIV-TDT	Zacatecas, Zac.	40.76 kW
