= Channel 8 =

Channel 8 or TV 8 may refer to

== Television networks, channels and stations ==
- Channel 8 (Israel), a television channel in Israel
- Channel 8 (Singaporean TV channel), a Chinese-language television channel in Singapore
- Channel 8 (Thai TV channel), a television channel in Thailand
- Channel 8 Corporation, a media corporation in the Kurdistan Region of Iraq
- DTV-8, a Guyanese television channel
- TV8 (Estonia), a television channel in Estonia
- TV8 (Italian TV channel), a television channel in Italy
- TV8 (Lithuanian TV channel), a terrestrial, satellite and cable television channel
- TV8 (Moldovan TV channel), a television channel in Moldova
- TV8 (Mongolian TV channel), a television channel in Mongolia
- TV8 (Swedish TV channel), a Swedish news channel
- TV8 (Turkish TV channel), a Turkish television channel
- Southern Cross TV8, the former name of 10 (Southern Cross Austereo) during its phase as a regional television network in Victoria, Australia
- 8TV (Malaysian TV network), a Chinese-language television network in Malaysia
- Canal 8 de Tucumán, a television station in San Miguel de Tucumán, Argentina
- CBC TV 8 (Barbados), the national broadcaster of Barbados
- CCTV-8, a Chinese television channel
- NewsChannel 8 (cable channel), a regional cable television network in Washington, District of Columbia
- TVB8, a defunct Mandarin-language Hong Kong television channel
- Canal 8 UCV TV, a Chilean television channel, 1974–2002
- Ágape TV (Canal 8), a Salvadoran television channel
- Fuji Television, a Japanese television station
  - BS Fuji, a Japanese television channel
- Trojan Vision, the student-run television station at the University of Southern California
- Unicanal, a Paraguayan pay televisión channel exclusive in TigoStar vía Channel 8 in Asunción
- VTV8, a Vietnamese television channel
- TV8 (Norway), a television channel in Norway replaced by Fox Crime (Norway)
- Canal 8 Sport, a former television channel in Denmark
- Television Nacional, a defunct network in Guatemala
- TN8, a Nicaraguan television channel
- Channel 8 (Rosario, Uruguay)
- Thebes Channel, an Egyptian regional television channel
- C8 (French TV channel), a defunct French television channel
- Okto, a defunct Singaporean television channel whose channel number on cable was 8
- RTL8, a Dutch television channel
- Puls 8, a Swiss television channel
- Channel 8, the former name of Indian Bengali-language television channel Sony Aath

== Other uses ==
- TV8 (magazine), a French language weekly magazine about television programming, published by Ringier in Switzerland
- Channel Ocho, a fictitious Spanish-language station on The Simpsons
- "Channel 8", a fictional competing broadcaster to "U-62 in UHF (film)

== See also ==
- 8tv (disambiguation)
- Channel 8 branded TV stations in the United States
- Channel 8 virtual TV stations in Canada
- Channel 8 virtual TV stations in Mexico
- Channel 8 virtual TV stations in the United States

For VHF frequencies covering 180–186 MHz:

- Channel 8 TV stations in Canada
- Channel 8 TV stations in Mexico
- Channel 8 digital TV stations in the United States
- Channel 8 low-power TV stations in the United States
