= The Round Number =

Documentary film about The Holocaust

- המספר העגול
- Directed by: David Fisher
- Written by: David Fisher
- Produced by: David Fisher; Leigh Heiman; Errol Morris (executive producer)
- Cinematography: Ron Katzenelson; Ronen Mayo; Claudio Steinberg; Leigh Heiman
- Edited by: Ron Omer; Hadas Ayalon; Hila Haramatti
- Music by: Ran Bagno
- Production company: Fisher Features Ltd.
- Distributed by: Go2Films
- Release date: August 25, 2021 (Jerusalem Film Festival)
- Running time: 60 minutes
- Country: Israel
- Languages: Hebrew, English

The Round Number (Hebrew: המספר העגול, HaMispar HaAgul) is a 2021 Israeli documentary film by Fisher Features Ltd., written, directed, and produced by David Fisher for HOT8. The film examines the figure of "Six Million", the accepted count of Jewish victims of the Holocaust and the historical, political and ethical questions it raises.

== Synopsis ==
David Fisher, the film's director and the son of Holocaust survivors, examines how the number "six million" became canonical in collective memory as the defining symbol of the Holocaust. In an attempt to trace the source of the number, Fisher raises various questions regarding history, politics, and identity that echo the ongoing debate among historians: What is the origin of the number? When does the counting of victims begin and end? Who was the first victim and who was the last? What are the problems inherent in the counting process, and will we ever reach an exact number of the Jewish victims of the Holocaust? Fisher asks whether the number has become so deeply embedded in public consciousness as to be beyond scrutiny, becoming effectively “untouchable”, or whether the duty to rigorously examine it is the only way to truly protect it.

Throughout the film, Fisher interviews key historians in the field of Holocaust studies, including Yehuda Bauer, Dina Porat, Omer Bartov, and Hanna Yablonka, each of whom presents a different approach to the subject.

Similar to his previous films concerning the Holocaust, Love Inventory and Six Million and One, The Round Number is also intertwined with the director's family history. The Israeli critic Shmulik Duvdevani argues that the film is effectively a continuation of the director's journey that began in Love Inventory, noting that Fisher is driven throughout the film by "the command of his late father."

== Production ==
The film was produced with the support of HOT8. The executive producer is Errol Morris, whom Fisher first met while teaching at Yale University. Fisher struggled to find sufficient support from Israeli public funds and foreign sources due to the incendiary subject in the center of the film and concerns about being accused of Antisemitism or trivializing the Holocaust. He eventually turned to personal funding to assure the completion of the production. The film's soundtrack was designed by Avi Mizrahi.

== Participants ==
- Hanna Yablonka
- Yehuda Bauer
- Dina Porat
- Avraham (Tito) Milgram
- Yoel Rappel
- Alexander Avraham
- Omer Bartov
- Arie Barnea
- Yitzhak Arad
- Nili Keren
- Gabriel Bach
- Israel Gutman (Voice only)
- Avihu Ronen
- Ronel Fisher
- Avigdor Shachan
- Carlos Huerta
- Carol Kidron
- Ilana Rosenfeld
- Devorah Efrati
- Aryeh Geniger
- Shlomit Snir
- Mark Peters
- Hauke Peters

== Screenings ==
The film premiered at the Jerusalem Film Festival in August 2021.

In 2022, the film was screened at the Transilvania International Film Festival and at the Buenos Aires International Festival of Independent Cinema (BAFICI) as part of a retrospective held for Fisher's filmography. Following the screenings, several Argentine critics wrote about the film in the context of the people who disappeared during the military junta rule between 1976 and 1983, whose number is unknown to this day.

In 2023, the film was selected for the art collection of Duke University. In the same year, the film was awarded runner-up in the Screen-Based Practice Research category at the British Association of Film, Television and Screen Studies (BAFTSS).

== Critical reception ==
The film provoked public discourse and controversy, both over the questions it raises and over Fisher's very willingness to engage them. Several critics argued that the questions Fisher raises are important and fundamental, allowing for public discourse on a subject previously feared and neglected. Conversely, others argued that the film might further cloud the memory and legacy of the Holocaust. Despite praising the comprehensive and meticulous work done on the film, noted historian Dina Porat raised concerns that given that a child of Holocaust survivors raises such questions could encourage audiences to doubt the established figure of Jewish victims. Freddy Eytan and Yaakov Ahimeir expressed concern that the film would benefit Holocaust denial. Dani Dayan, the chairman of Yad Vashem, and others claimed that the very engagement with a subject they deemed "marginal" is ridiculous and unnecessary in the grand scheme of The Holocaust. In contrast, Uri Klein argued that Fisher engages with one of the defining existential symbols of Israeli society and that doing so was a courageous act, while Avner Shavit wrote that the director’s insistence on taking nothing for granted does not damage the Holocaust’s legacy but rather enacts its lessons. Meir Schnitzer argues that the film highlights the methodical approach of the "New Historians" (Hanna Yablonka and Omer Bartov), faithful to documents and firsthand testimonies, over that of the "Old Historians" (Dina Porat), and that "it exposes mechanisms of cutting corners, deliberate blurring of the truth, and manipulative use of history for temporary propaganda gains".

In response to the controversy surrounding the film, Fisher wrote a column explaining his approach regarding the overall subject and elaborated about the differences between Documentary filmmaking and academic research in light of the process of making the film.
