= List of television stations in Puebla =

The following is a list of all IFT-licensed over-the-air television stations broadcasting in the Mexican state of Puebla. There are 17 television stations in Puebla.

Notably, there are no Televisa network transmitters legally licensed to Puebla. Televisa network service in the city of Puebla is provided from transmitters at Altzomoni, State of Mexico. Televisa's Tehuacán transmitters are repeaters of the stations at Huajuapan de León, Oaxaca.

== List of television stations ==
RF	VC	Call sign	Location	Network/name	ERP	Concessionaire
24	1	XHPUR-TDT	Puebla; Actipan; Atlixco; Tlaxcala, Tlax.	Azteca Uno (adn40)	53.51 kW; 17.75 kW; 2.75 kW; 21.96 kW	Televisión Azteca
21	3	XHCTPU-TDT	Puebla; Tlaxcala, Tlax.	Imagen Televisión (Excélsior TV)	100 kW	Cadena Tres I, S.A. de C.V.
29	4	XHP-TDT	Puebla; Tlaxcala, Tlax.	Televisa Regional	95 kW; 30 kW	Televisora de Occidente
15	6	XHMTPU-TDT	Puebla; Tlaxcala, Tlax.	Canal 6 (Milenio Televisión, CGTN En Español, Popcorn Central)	122.5 kW	Multimedios Televisión
27	7	XHTEM-TDT	Puebla; Actipan; Atlixco; Tlaxcala, Tlax.	Azteca 7 (a+)	53.32 kW; 17.52 kW; 2.74 kW; 21.91 kW	Televisión Azteca
12	11	XHCPAN-TDT	Puebla	Canal Once (Once niños)	83.231 kW	Instituto Politécnico Nacional
32	13	XHTMPT-TDT	Puebla; Tlaxcala, Tlax.	Telsusa (Canal 13)	109.825 kW	Telsusa Televisión México
30	14	XHSPRPA-TDT	Puebla	SPR multiplex (Canal Catorce, TV UNAM, Canal 22)	31.94 kW	Sistema Público de Radiodifusión del Estado Mexicano
8	18	XHBUAP-TDT	Puebla	TV BUAP	17.5 kW	Benemérita Universidad Autónoma de Puebla
11		XHCSAI-TDT	Puebla			Radio Lacustre, A.C.
28	1	XHTHN-TDT	Tehuacán	Azteca Uno (adn40)	17.36 kW	Televisión Azteca
34	7	XHTHP-TDT	Tehuacán	Azteca 7 (a+)	17.08 kW	Televisión Azteca
8	18	XHTEH-TDT	Tehuacán	TV BUAP	1.368 kW	Benemérita Universidad Autónoma de Puebla
10		XHCSAJ-TDT	Tehuacán			Radio Lacustre, A.C.
20	2/5	XHZAP-TDT	Zacatlán	Las Estrellas (Canal 5)	20 kW	Televimex
11	16	XHPBZC-TDT	Zacatlán; Puebla City (RF 26)	SICOM Televisión	0.180 kW; 72.8 kW	Gobierno del Estado de Puebla
