= DTV =

DTV may refer to:

== Arts and entertainment ==
=== Businesses ===
- Dialog TV, Sri Lanka (founded 2005)
- DirecTV, United States (founded 1994; NASDAQ/NYSE:DTV)
- dtv Verlagsgesellschaft, a German publisher (founded 1960)

=== Television channels ===
- DTV (Moldovan TV channel)
- DTV (RTÉ), Dublin, Ireland
- DTV-8, Guyana

=== Other uses in arts and entertainment ===
- D-TV, a Disney music television series (1984–1989)
- Digital television, a broadcasting technology since the 1990s
- Direct-to-video, a film distribution model
- Dziennik Telewizyjny, a Polish news program (1958–1989)
- Lemino, a Japanese streaming service (formerly dTV 2015–2023)

== Organizations ==
- Dealer Team Vauxhall, in motorsport (1971–1981)
- German Transport Workers' Union, a trade union (1897–1929)

== Science and technology ==
- Miro (video software), named DTV from 2005 to 2007
- Deer tick virus, an encephalitis pathogen
- Digital television, a broadcasting technology since the 1990s

== See also ==
- NPO "Digital Television Systems" (DTVS), Russian TV equipment company
