= Teotlalpan, Puebla =

Teotlalpan
- Town
- Location in Mexico
- Coordinates: 19°50′N 98°2′W
- Country: Mexico
- State: Puebla
- Municipality: Chignahuapan

Population (2010)
  - Total: 236

Teotlalpan is a town of Chignahuapan, in the state of Puebla.

== See also ==
- Chignahuapan
