= Mostar Round-Trip =

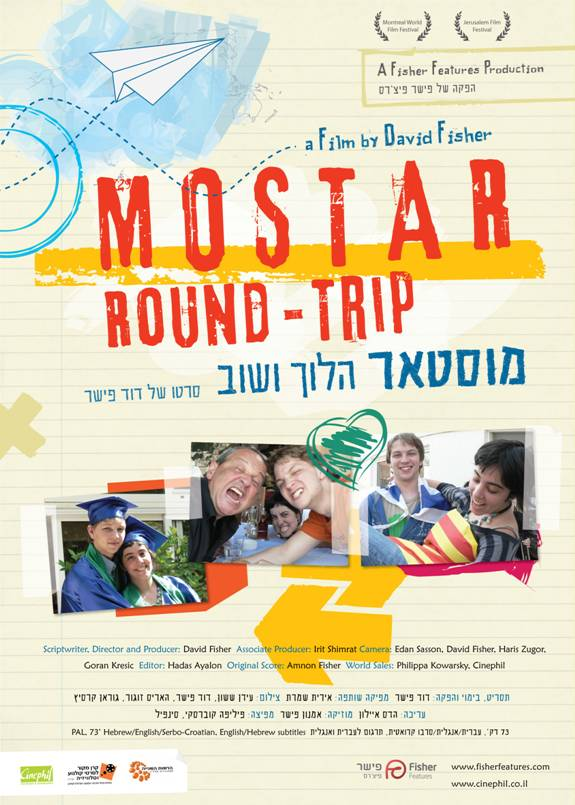
- Official film poster
- Directed by: David Fisher
- Produced by: David Fisher; Irit Shimrat (Associate producer)
- Starring: Yuval Fisher; David Fisher; Neus Rodeta; Salam Sa’adi; Niva Alush; Niv Bahr; Yuli Urbach; Amitai Ben Abba; Vera Pluemer
- Cinematography: Edan Sasson; David Fisher; Haris Žugor; Goran Krešić
- Edited by: Hadas Ayalon
- Music by: Amnon Fisher
- Release date: 2011
- Running time: 73 minutes/ 52 minutes
- Languages: Hebrew; English; Serbo-Croatian; English subtitles

Mostar Round-Trip (Hebrew: מוסטאר הלוך ושוב) is a 2011 Israeli documentary film, a Fisher Features Ltd. release directed and produced by David Fisher. The film follows his son, Yuval and his classmates who are studying in an international high-school, United World College in Mostar, Bosnia and Herzegovina. The film exposes the recuperating city, which has been greatly damaged during the Bosnian War and is now geographically divided between the Bosniak and Croat populations.

This is the second film in the family trilogy created by Fisher that started with the critically acclaimed Love Inventory (2000) and completed by Six Million and One (2011).

== Plot summary ==
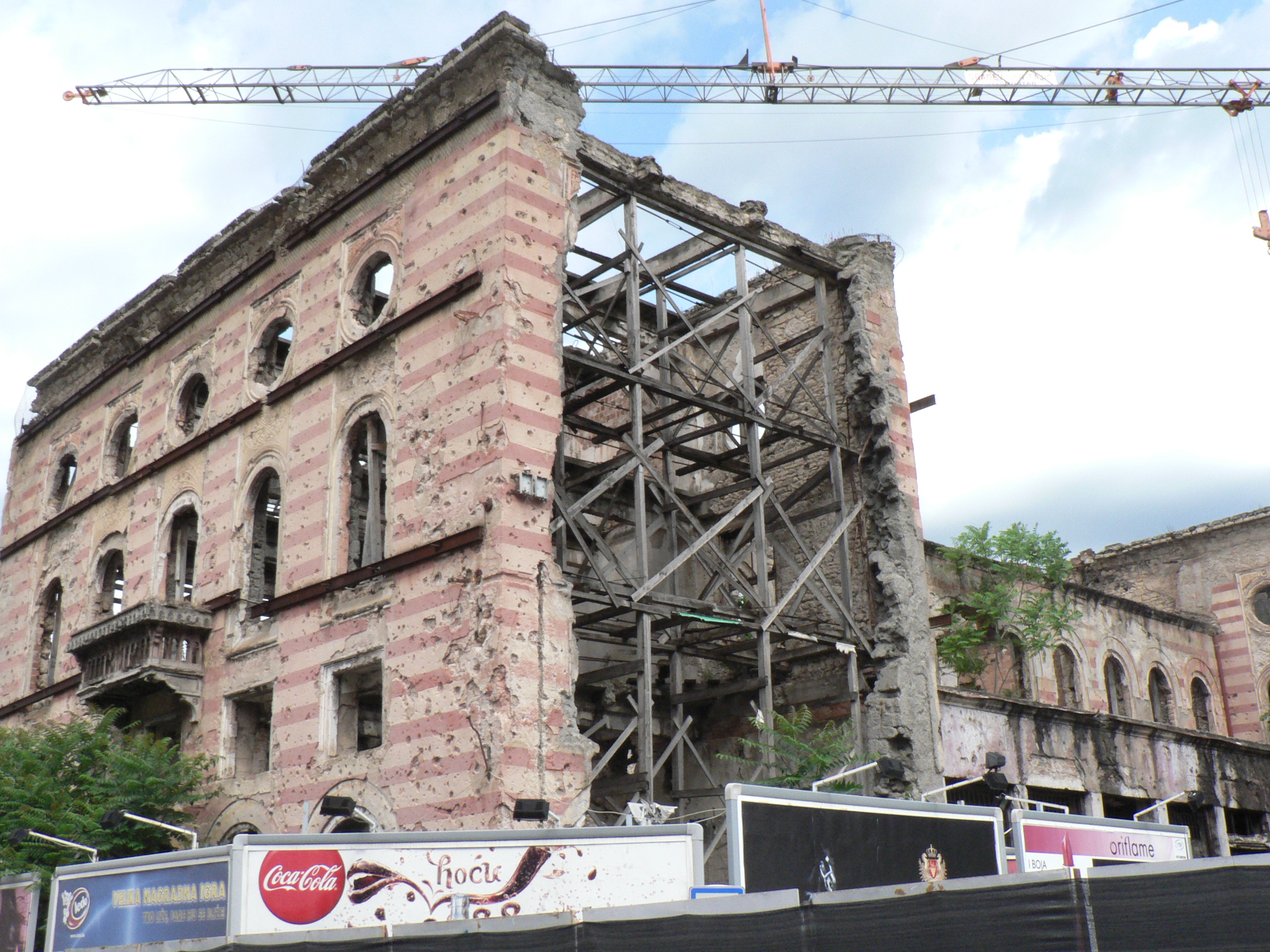
Reconstruction of Tito's Palace in Mostar. The film depicts several buildings and structures that have been damaged during the Bosnian War, including Stari Most (the old bridge) which has been restored after being mostly destroyed during the war.

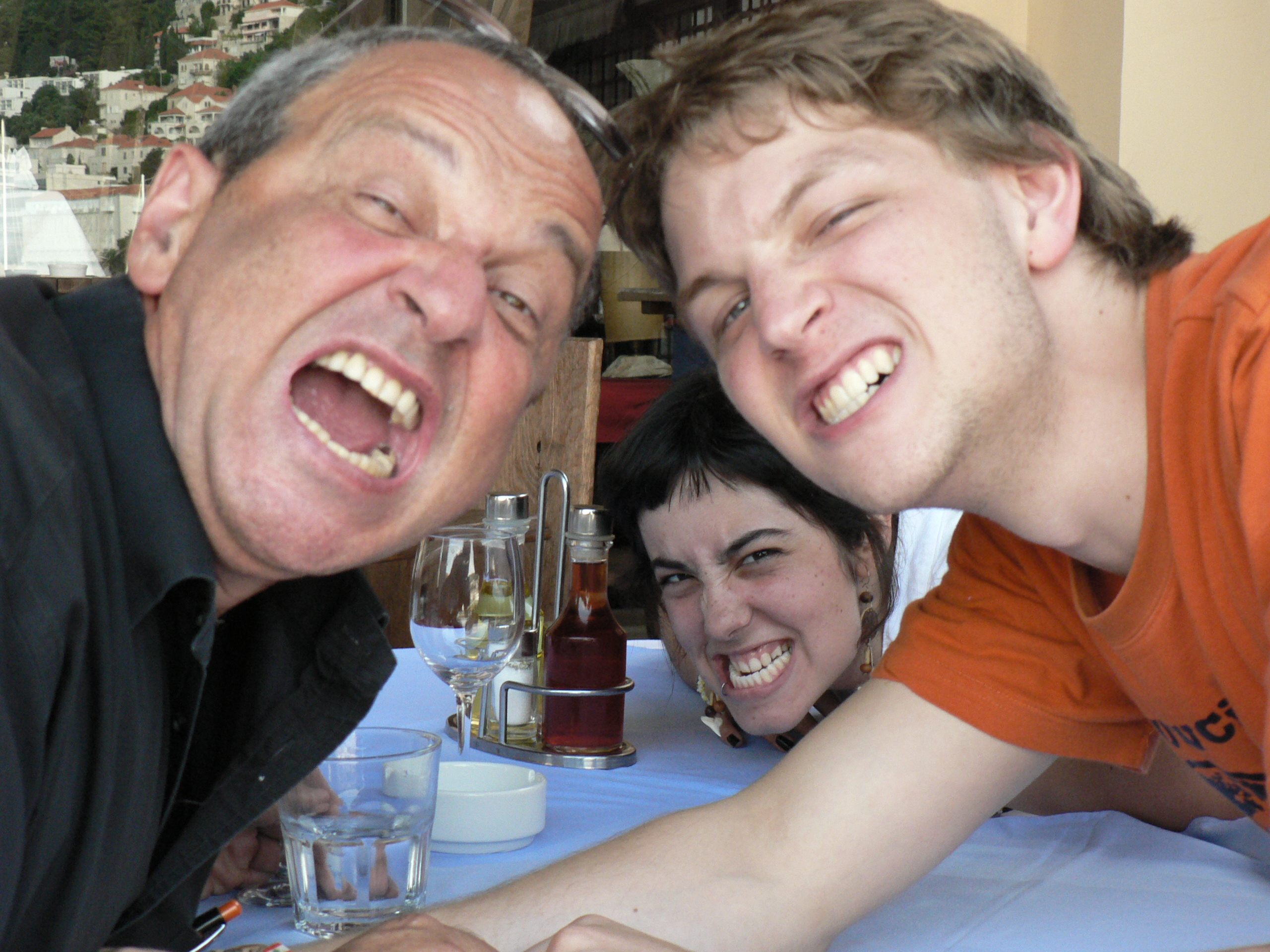
From left to right: Director David Fisher, Neus Rodeta and Yuval Fisher

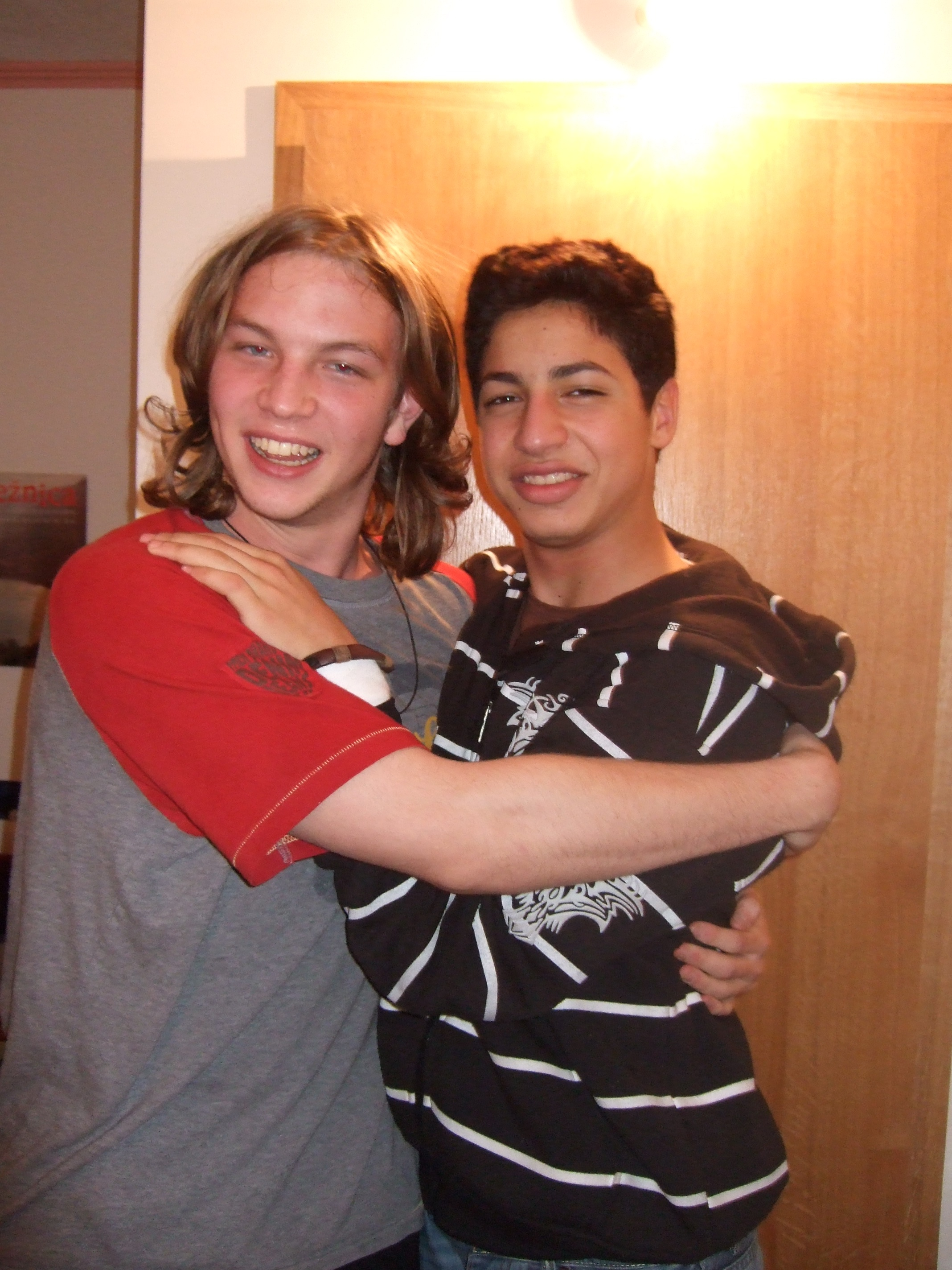
From left to right: Yuval Fisher and Salam Sa’adi

A year after 17-year-old Yuval leaves home in Israel to attend the United World College in Mostar, Bosnia and Herzegovina, filmmaker David Fisher, his father, follows. While the film centers around the young students inhabiting the college, David uses the film as a tool to contemplate and examine his role as a parent, acknowledging that one of his deep regrets was not getting to know his own father, who was an introvert affected by Holocaust. During three Round-Trips to Mostar, Yuval's relationships unfold: between him and his father, his Israeli peers and his Spanish girlfriend, Neus, a relationship which is ultimately doomed - because of Yuval's impending military service.

The film addresses different issues concerning Coming of age such as alienation, love, family and military service (part of the film is set during the Gaza War). These stories are set against the backdrop of this college, situated on what used to be the frontline between the Croatians and the Bosniaks, during the Bosnian War that ended in 1995. Although Yuval is far from home, this actually brings him and his father closer together. Their talks reveal father and teenager son tension with great honesty, maturity and openness. Yuval's roommate is Salam, an Israeli Arab, with whom he holds passionate political debates. Salam is a "playboy" and a charmer, so it's no wonder Yuval brings him a sugar cube to bed, one morning after a bitter fight they had over Middle Eastern politics. With them are also Niv, who talks very honestly about his encounter with Arab peers, stating that back home the word "Arab" is used in a derogative way amongst his friends, a fact he is now ashamed of; and Niva – she just wants to be an actress and doesn't know what to expect from her army service. The film is filled with John Hughes like scenes of the life of youngsters at the college, but with the ironic setting of a city that doesn't leave them indifferent.

The UWC college is portrayed as microcosms which proves as a valuable stage in preparing the students for a mature and challenging life as grownups.

== Production ==
The film was shot in video and is available in Digibeta format. Two versions of the film are available - a 73 minutes Festival cut and a 52 minutes TV and educational cut. The film was produced for The Second Authority for TV and Radio in Israel with the support of The Makor Foundation for Israeli film – the Israeli Film Council.

Amnon Fisher, the director's brother wrote and performed the film's theme song "Father and Son".

== Release ==
The film was selected and screened at the following film festivals:

- Jerusalem International Film Festival 2011.
- Montreal World Film Festival 2011.
- Auburn International Film Festival for Children and Young Adults in Australia 2011.
- Exground Filmfest in Wiesbaden, Germany 2011 - in the Focus Israel category.
- Bucharest Jewish Film Festival 2012.
- Isratim - Israeli Film Festival in Paris 2012.
- Crossing Europe Film Festival in Linz, Austria 2012, where the opening film was Six Million and One, directed by David Fisher.
- Belgrade Documentary Film Festival 2012.
- Doxa Documentary Film Festival 2012.

== Critical reception ==
- Screen International Review
- Globes Review
- Dnevni List Review
- Ynet Review
