= Six Million and One =

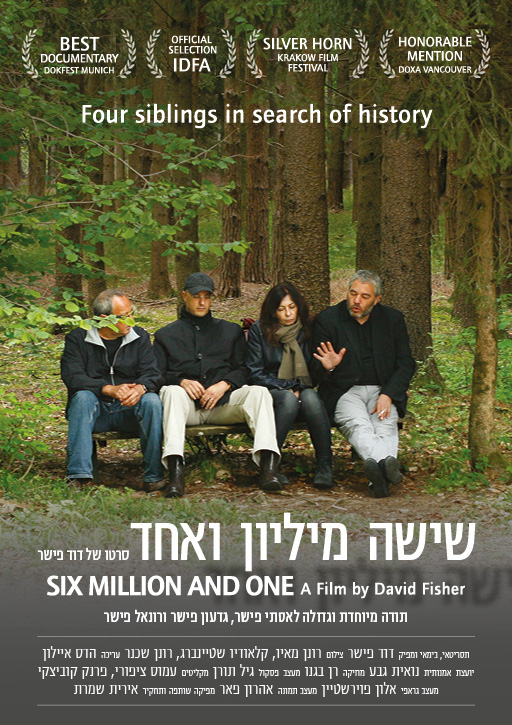
- film poster
- Directed by: David Fisher
- Produced by: David Fisher; Irit Shimrat; Fisher Features Ltd.
- Starring: Estee Fisher; David Fisher; Gideon Fisher; Ronel Fisher
- Cinematography: Ronen Mayo; Claudio Steinberg; Ronen Schechner
- Edited by: Hadas Ayalon
- Music by: Ran Bagno
- Release date: 2011
- Running time: 93 minutes
- Languages: Hebrew; English; German; English subtitles

Six Million and One (Hebrew: שישה מיליון ואחד) is a 2011 Israeli documentary film, a Fisher Features Ltd. release, written directed and produced by David Fisher. This is the third and final film in the family trilogy created by Fisher after Love Inventory (2000) and Mostar Round-Trip (2011).

== Plot summary ==
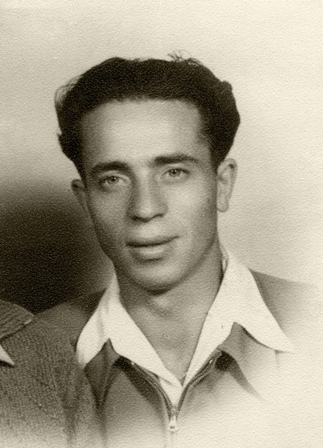
Joseph Fischer, the director's father

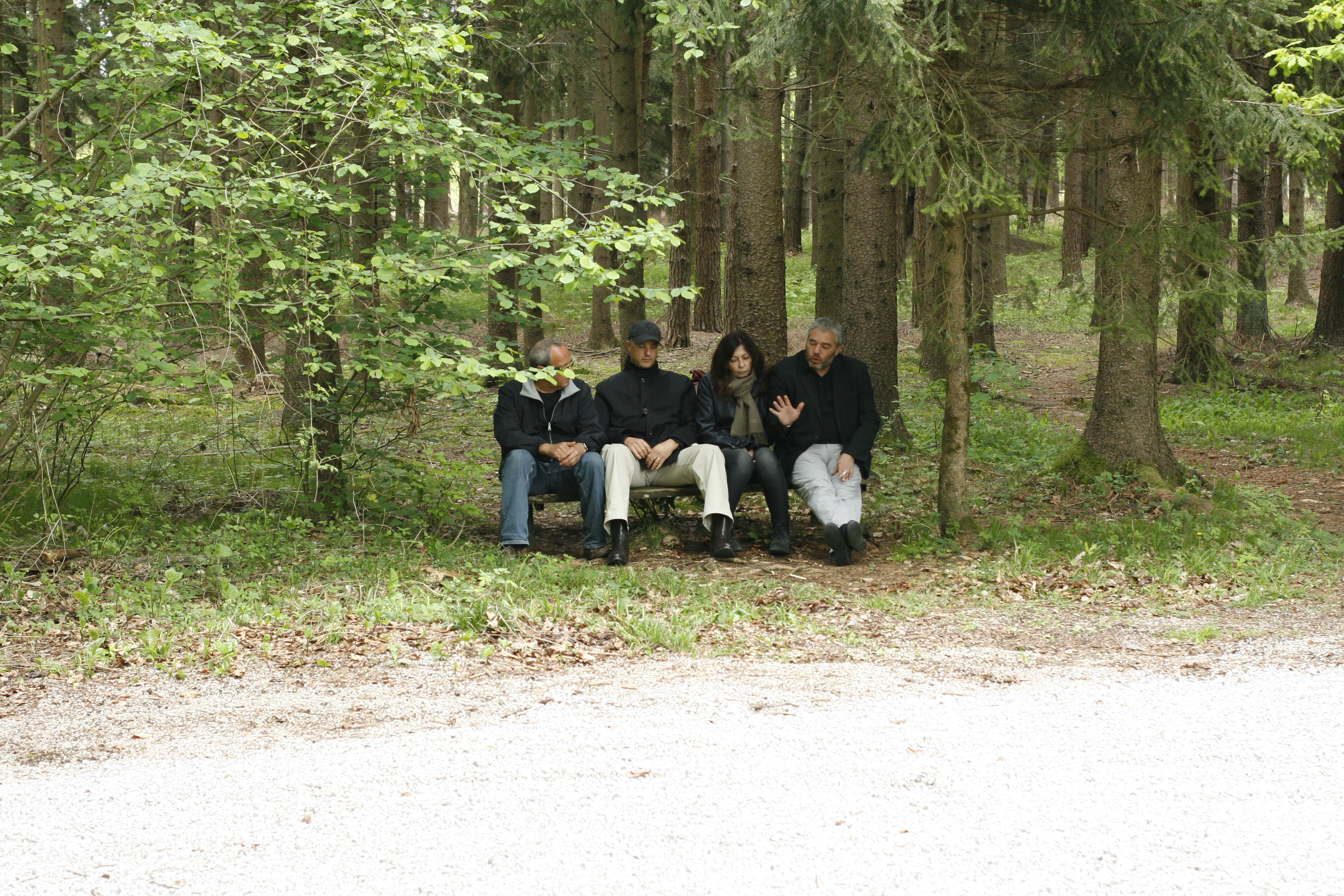
From left to right: David, Gideon, Estee and Ronel in Gunskirchen, the spot from which their father was liberated

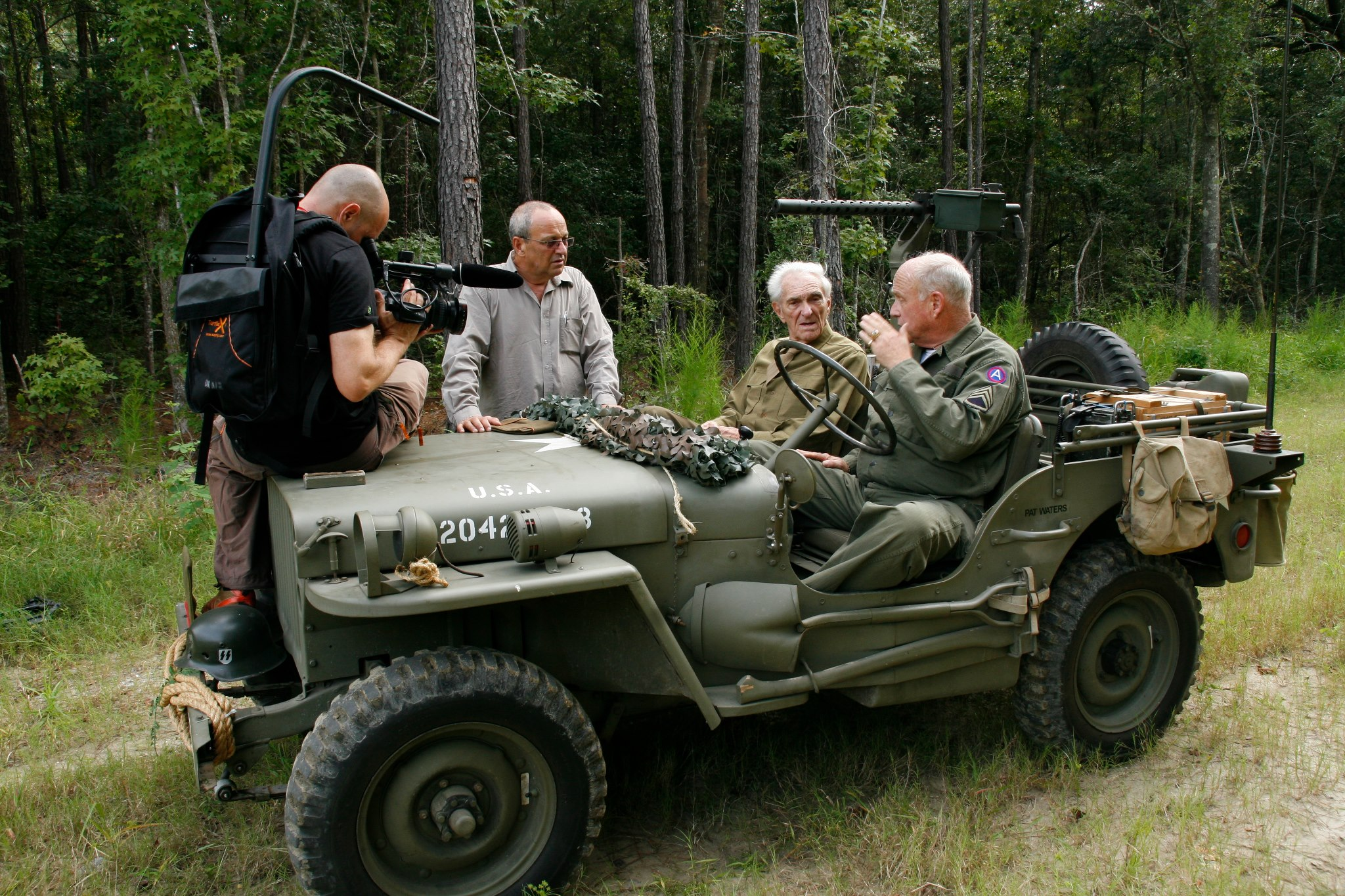
Cinematographer Ronen Schechner, director David Fisher, Gunskirchen liberator and WWII veteran Mickey Dorsey and Pat Waters (son of General George S. Patton) during the making of Six Million And One

Joseph Fischer's memoir was discovered only after his death. His children refused to confront it, except for David, the filmmaker, for whom it became a compass for a long journey. When David found it unbearable to be alone in the wake of his father's survival story and in his struggle not to lose his sanity, he convinced his brothers and sister to join him in the hope that this would also contribute to releasing tensions and bring them as close as they used to be. His siblings, for their part, couldn't understand why anyone should want to dig into the past instead of enjoying life in the present. The journey eventually leads the Fishers into the dark depths of the B8 Bergkristall tunnels, part of the Austrian KZ Gusen II concentration camp, where their father endured forced labor during the Holocaust. Illuminated only by flashlights, they seek meaning in their personal and family histories and undergo surgical and revealing discussions about family, survival and individualism only to come to the realization that they are unable to fully understand their father's past and the events that haunted him. Joseph Fischer's last couple of weeks at Gunskirchen concentration camp, were an inhuman experience that blocked his writing. In order to find out what his father failed to describe about Gunskirchen's liberation David located veterans of the 71st Infantry Division who liberated the camp. The elderly soldiers are still haunted and traumatized by the horrific sights they came across when entering the camp. Through their journey, the Fishers become emblematic of the entire second generation who are still grappling with the experience of their survivor parents.

Director's statement: "For me, This isn't a film about the Holocaust, because we (Me and my siblings) spent most of our time laughing and there is nothing funny about the Holocaust; It's about a rare kind of intimacy and brotherly bond that replaced pain with bitter-sweet humor."

== Production ==
The film was shot on HD and was released on DCP and HDCAM. It was produced for ZDF/ARTE in Europe and YesDocu in Israel with the support of The New Fund for Cinema and Television (NFCT), the Israeli Film Council, with the collaboration of the Claims Conference, the Cultural Office of Upper Austria, the Future Fund and Nationalfonds, Austria.

The film was theatrically released in Israel by Lev theaters, in Austria by Thimfilm and in the US by Nancy Fishman Film Releasing, premiering at Lincoln Plaza Cinema, New York and broadcast on BBC Four.

Additional production credits:

- Noit Geva - Artistic Consultant
- Amos Zipori and Frank Kubitsky - Sound Recordists
- Gil Toren - Sound Designer
- Alon Feuerstein - Graphic Designer
- Aharon Peer - Colorist

== Special events ==
The film is regularly shown at special events, seminars and advanced studies that concern such topics as Holocaust diaries, memory and trauma and the second generation to Holocaust survivors.

Screenings at:

- The British Conference for Jewish Studies at the University of Kent in Canterbury UK July 7, 2013.
- The American Psychoanalytic Association in NYC January 16, 2014.
- The United Nations at Vienna during International Holocaust Memorial Day - January 27, 2014.
- The Cleveland Museum of Art March 12, 2014.
- "The Walk of Life" march in Gusen, Austria April 5, 2014.
- The 167 annual International American Psychiatric Association Conference NYC May 4, 2014.

== Festivals and awards ==
The film was selected and screened at the following film festivals:

- Haifa International Film Festival 2011 - World premiere.
- International Documentary Film Festival Amsterdam (IDFA) 2011 - Feature length competition top 10 in the Audience Choices.

A great film, really emotional, open and wonderful interaction. I am recommending it on tonight's IDFA talkshow.

— International Producer Peter Wintonick IDFA programming advisor and Media Talks team, November 17, 2011

- Crossing Europe Film Festival, Linz, Austria 2012 - Opening film.
- DOK.fest International Documentary Film Festival, Munich 2012 - won Best Documentary Award.

A remarkable film about one of the biggest tragedies in history: In a compelling manner, the film maker, David Fisher,
manages to lucidly and efficiently combine an emotional family story with elements of universal questions
in a surprisingly light and charming way – taking us all on a memorable and touching journey.

— Jury citation for Best Documentary Award, 2012

- Kraków Film Festival 2012 - won Silver Horn for the Director of the Best Feature Length Documentary .
- Doxa Film Festival Vancouver 2012 - Honorable Mention.
- Muestra Film Festival Bogotá, Colombia 2012.
- Minsk International Film Festival 2012
- Exground Film Fest Wiesbaden, Germany 2012
- Seattle International Film Festival 2012
- Louisville International Film Festival (LIFF) 2012
- Cork Film Festival, Ireland 2012
- Macon Film Festival, Georgia, US 2013
- Jewish and Israeli film festivals: San Francisco 2012, Berlin 2012 - won Best German film with Jewish content award, Toronto 2012, Rome and Milan 2012, Palm Beach 2012, Boston, Philadelphia, Virginia, Pittsburgh, Minneapolis, Melbourne, Hong Kong, London.

In 2012 the film won the Israeli Ministry of Culture and Sport award for works in the field of Zionism.

== Critical review ==
Rotten Tomatoes gives the film a score of 90% based on ten reviews. Metacritic gives the film an average score of 52 out of 100, based on five reviews.
