= Gideon Fisher =

Israeli lawyer and public figure

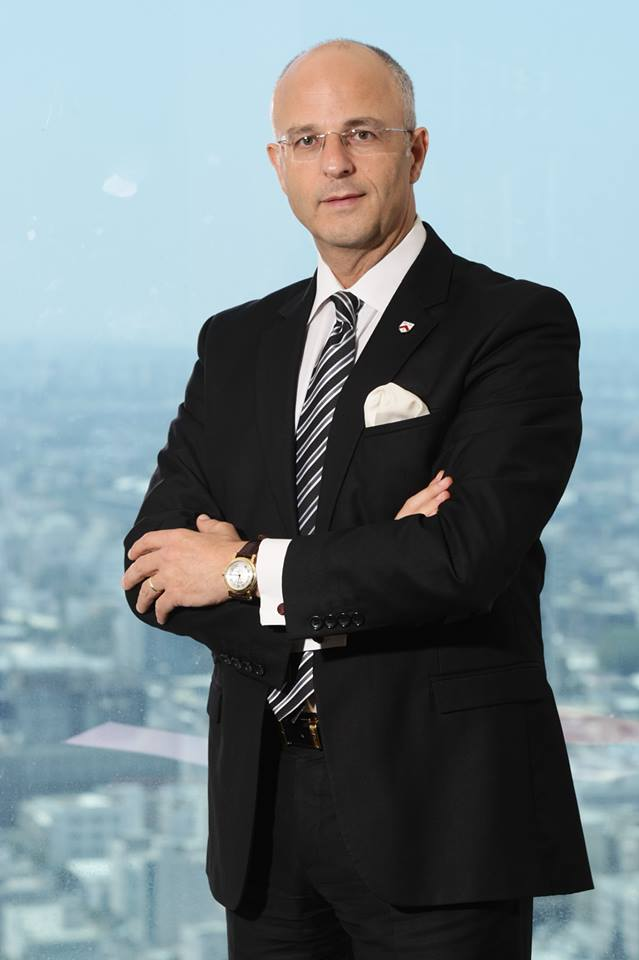
Fisher in 2012

Gideon Fisher (Hebrew: גדעון פישר; born August 1965) is an Israeli lawyer and public figure. He is the founder of the Fisher Foundation for Holocaust Survivors.

== Biography ==
Fisher was born on August 11, 1965. He is the son of Joseph and Malli Fisher who were Holocaust survivors. His father grew up in Austria and Israel and was a member of the Palmach. Fisher has four siblings, including David Fisher.

Fisher is head of the Israeli National Parents Association (INPA), Chairman of the Israeli International Arbitration Committee of the International Chamber of Commerce and was head of the Women's International Zionist Organization (Wizo) fundraising organization until 2012. Fisher is a lawyer and heads a law firm that carries his name.

In 2026, the Government of Israel designated Fisher to serve on the International Centre for Settlement of Investment Disputes (ICSID) Panel of Conciliators. His six-year term runs from April 20, 2026, to April 20, 2032.
