= XHBUAP-FM =

University radio station in Puebla

- Puebla, Puebla; Mexico
- Frequency: 96.9 MHz
- Branding: Radio BUAP

Programming
- Format: University radio

Ownership
- Owner: Benemérita Universidad Autónoma de Puebla

History
- First air date: August 25, 1997
- Call sign meaning: Benemérita Universidad Autónoma de Puebla

Technical information
- ERP: 10 kW

Links
- Website: radiobuap.com

XHBUAP-FM is a Mexican radio station serving Puebla, Puebla owned by the Benemérita Universidad Autónoma de Puebla. It is branded as Radio BUAP and broadcasts on 96.9 FM from its campus.

== History ==
Efforts by the BUAP to build a radio station date to 1965 but met with much resistance. XHBUAP-FM did not receive its permit until August 1997.

In 2011, XHBUAP received permits to expand its signal to Chignahuapan (XHCHP-FM 104.3, 3 kW) and Tehuacán (XHTEE-FM 93.9, 3 kW). These stations take some programs from Puebla but also have their own program schedules.

Former logo
