= Channel 8 TV stations in Mexico =

The following television stations broadcast on digital channel 8 in Mexico:

- XHBUAP-TDT in Puebla, Puebla
- XHCPAF-TDT in Puerto Vallarta, Jalisco
- XHTEH-TDT in Tehuacán, Puebla
- XHUS-TDT in Hermosillo, Sonora
