= David Fisher (filmmaker) =

Israeli documentary film director

- דוד פישר
- Born: October 14, 1956 (age 70); Petah Tiqva, Israel
- Occupations: Documentary film director, producer, lecturer

David Fisher (Hebrew: דוד פישר; born October 14, 1956) is an Israeli documentary film director, producer and lecturer. In 1999–2008, he was Director General of The New Fund for Cinema and Television (NFCT).

== Biography ==
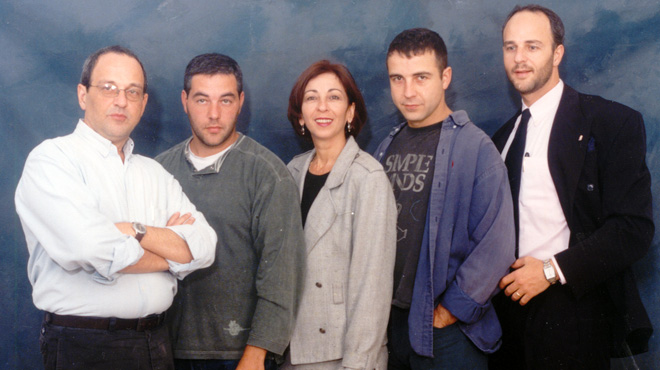
From left to right: Fisher, along with his four siblings Ronel, Estee, Amnon and Gideon, taken from the film Love Inventory.

David Fisher was born to Joseph Fischer (born in Vișeu de Sus, Romania) and Mali (born in Vashkivtsi, Ukraine), both Holocaust survivors. His four siblings Estee, Gideon, Ronel and Amnon are featured prominently in his films Love Inventory, Six Million and One and The Round Number. Amnon contributed the soundtrack for his films Love Inventory, Six Million and One and Street Shadows. Fisher received his BFA degree in Cinema Studies from Tel Aviv University in 1983 and worked at the Israeli Educational Television (IETV) until 1989.

Fisher is married to Lili, with whom he has three children: Yael, Daniele and Yuval. In Fisher's film Mostar Round-Trip (2011), he follows Yuval during his studies at the United World College in Mostar, Bosnia & Herzegovina.

== Film career ==
He was among the team that established the Tel Aviv Museum of Art's video workshops in 1989. In 1990 he started creating documentary films noted by Yedioth Ahronoth critic Amir Kaminer for being "Socially and humanly sensitive, politically aware, and displaying a keen eye for fascinating individuals and turbulent affairs".

Upon his tenure at The New Israeli Foundation for Cinema and Television (NFCT) in 2008, he re-founded Fisher Features Ltd, a film and television production company that will produce his films as a director. The company also works for international productions such as the four-hour miniseries The Promise produced by Daybreak Pictures for Channel 4 in the UK and Canal Plus, with the support of ARTE. Fisher often mentors first time film makers. From 2000 to 2001 he served as a visiting lecturer on research and docs scriptwriting for M.F.A. students at Tel Aviv University. From 2003 to 2004 he served as a Visiting Teacher at Beit Berl College and from 2005 to 2008 he served as a lecturer at Ma’aleh Film School in Jerusalem.

Fisher was a 2014 Schusterman Foundation Artist in Residence and visiting professor at Charlie Musser's documentary film workshop at the Film studies Department in Yale. On January 31, 2014, he gave a guest lecture in Brandeis University, after which he was invited to lecture a full course on Israeli Documentary Films for the 2015 spring semester. He was simultaneously invited as a Scholar in Residence to teach a course on Israeli documentary films at Wesleyan University CT at the 2015 spring semester.

Fisher has been recognized by Israeli daily newspaper Yedioth Ahronoth among the 100 most influential figures in Israeli cultural life in 2003 and 2004. In 2012 he became the first Israeli artist to receive the USA National Endowment for the Humanities (NEH) script grant for the film To Be Or Not To Be In Yiddish.

== NFCT - Film fund activity ==
From 1999 to 2008 Fisher served as the Director General of The New Fund for Cinema and Television (NFCT), a fund supporting the production of documentary films in Israel, most notably Waltz with Bashir, Checkpoint, Aviv, The Cemetery Club, Arna's Children and full-length feature films such as My Father My Lord. Fisher is considered instrumental in expanding the fund both economically and culturally, engaging peripheral and filmmakers from diverse backgrounds Jews and Arabs alike, including controversial films such as a film made by a West Bank Settler.

Fisher initiated film projects at the NFCT that were mainly in the documentary genre but also geared to narrative and experimental filmmakers:

- “Video Activism” – encouraging civic responsibilities among Israeli filmmakers.
- “Children's Stories” – a series that was aimed at young audiences in order to expand the target audience for documentaries.
- “Business Card” – a project tutoring first-time documentary filmmakers.
- “Other Faces” – a program for drama script development based on stories by Israel's Nobel Prize winner, Shay Agnon.

Fisher promoted Israeli documentary films in the international circuit:

- Between 2002 and 2005 Fisher represented Israel at the Euromed Audiovisual program MEDEA – a forum for co-productions between European and Mediterranean countries.
- in 2006 he founded "Greenhouse" – a Mediterranean film program supported by the European Union for the development of feature-length documentaries by Israeli and Arab first time filmmakers. The project sparked controversy during its first year of conduct but has gradually become successful and internationally recognized.
- Hosted the 2008 European Film Academy (EFA) program “Sunday in the Country” in Israel.
- Created a joint venture with the National Film Board of Canada (NFB) to co-develop feature-length documentaries..
- Initiated “Documentaly” - an anthology of articles about Israeli documentary film-making, published by Am Oved, 2007.
- Curated Israeli documentary showcase at ZagrebDox Int'l Festival, 2009.
- A film series & a co-production meeting between Israeli and German filmmakers at Hamburg Film Festival, 2006.
- Curated a 2 weeks documentary showcase “Homeland Insecurity” at the Two Boots Pioneer Theatre NYC, followed by panel discussions led by Village Voice film critic in New York (2005).
- In Cairo (2002-2003) Fisher took part in Israeli documentaries screenings at The Townhouse Gallery for two seasons. The event has never been publicly published due to the wish of the Egyptian initiator.
- A week long screenings at the Cinematheque in Budapest 2001–2003.
- An “Israel at the Millennium” retrospective at Facets Cinematheque Chicago, 2000.
- Screening Israeli documentaries at the Solomon Mikhoels art festival Moscow, 2000.

== Affiliations ==
- Member of the European Film Academy (EFA) since 2004
- Member of the Israeli Film Academy since 1998
- Member of the Board of the Massuah Holocaust Institute 2008–2011.
- Member of the board of Docaviv Int'l Film Festival in Tel-Aviv 2000-2001

Fisher is an active contributor to Israeli press and internet sites on social and cultural issues 2002–2009.

== Jury member at film events and international festivals ==
Fisher served as a juror in the following international film festivals: Dokufest International Documentary Film in Kosovo, International Documentary Film Festival Amsterdam (IDFA), Hot Docs Canadian International Documentary Festival in Toronto, Dok Leipzig in Germany, ZagrebDox in Croatia, European Film Academy (EFA) in Berlin, Karlovy Vary International Film Festival in The Czech Republic and Kraków Film Festival In Poland. He was a member of the 2007 Independent Television Service (ITVS) international panel.

== Awards and recognition ==
“Love Inventory” won the Wolgin award for best documentary at the Jerusalem International Film Festival (2000), the Ophir Award by the Israeli Film Academy for best documentary (2000), the DocuNoga award for best documentary (2000) and the Merit award at the Taiwan International Documentary Festival (2002).

“Six Million and One” won the Israeli Ministry of Culture and Sport award for works in the field of Zionism, the DOKfest Munich Best Documentary Award (2012), the Silver Horn to the Best Director award in Krakow Film Festival (2012), an Honorable Mention at the DOXA Documentary Film Festival in Vancouver (2012) and Best German film with Jewish content award in the Berlin Jewish Film Festival (2012).

== Filmography ==
Year	Film	Summary
2026	The Survivor in a Tuxedo: Tracing Elie Wiesel	A portrait of the life of celebrated Holocaust survivor and dedicated witness Elie Wiesel, who became an international icon of preserving the memory and legacy of the Holocaust as well as becoming the conscience of the “Free World”.
2021	The Round Number	A historical and personal journey examining how the number "six million" was determined and solidified as a symbol of the Holocaust, and how it became part of the canon of the Jewish people.
2015	Street Shadows	One short street in southern Tel Aviv - doomed to be a home for refugees ever since it was planned - brings forth a mosaic of characters living in a hallucinatory reality of a cityscape that has its charms, but is not always kind and merciful.
2011	Six Million and One	One man's memoir from a forced labor camp set against the unwillingness of a country to take responsibility over the wrongdoings in the past exposed in a powerful journey to Austria. An Israel-Germany(ZDE-ARTE 'Grand Format')-Austria co-production.
2011	Mostar Round-Trip	17-year-old Yuval leaves Israel to attend the UWC international high-school in Mostar, formerly the Croatian-Bosniak frontline during the civil war in Yugoslavia. A year later his father, filmmaker David Fisher follows.
2000	Love Inventory	An attempt to solve a personal mystery, which, in the process, brings a troubled family together.
1998	Little Big Sister	An intimate profile of Hedi Fried, a Swedish writer, therapist and Holocaust survivor. With the participation of actress Bibi Andersson. An Israel-Sweden-Romania co-production with the support of the European Union.
1997	A Shepherds affair	Romance & suspense among Jewish and Druze cattle growers on the Golan Heights.
1997	Shining Eyes	Postmodern revolutionaries of education in Israel.
1996	Lost Days in November	Following the meetings late Israeli Prime Minister Mr. Rabin missed in the 2 weeks after his assassination.
1996	Buried Alive	An abandoned woman (aguna) goes after her husband who disappeared 20 years ago. Festivals: Jerusalem IFF 96, Leipzig 96, FIPA Biarritz 97, Montreal 97.
1995	Missing	Jonah Baumel and Eissa Hamed, two sides of the Middle Eastern fence: Israeli and Palestinian.
1994	The Mediator	The assassination of UN mediator, Folke Bernadotte, in Jerusalem of 1948. Shot in Israel, Sweden and Germany.
1993	Parallel Tracks	The interdisciplinary excellence program versus underprivileged students program at the Tel-Aviv University.
1993	Landscapes of Memory	The national myth and its mark on landscape - memorials for the fallen in Israel
1993	It's a Deal	Joint business ventures for Jews and Arabs.
1993	Mister X	The story of Mr. X, secret agent Avrum Agam and his life legend.
