= Juliet Jacques =

British journalist (born 1981)

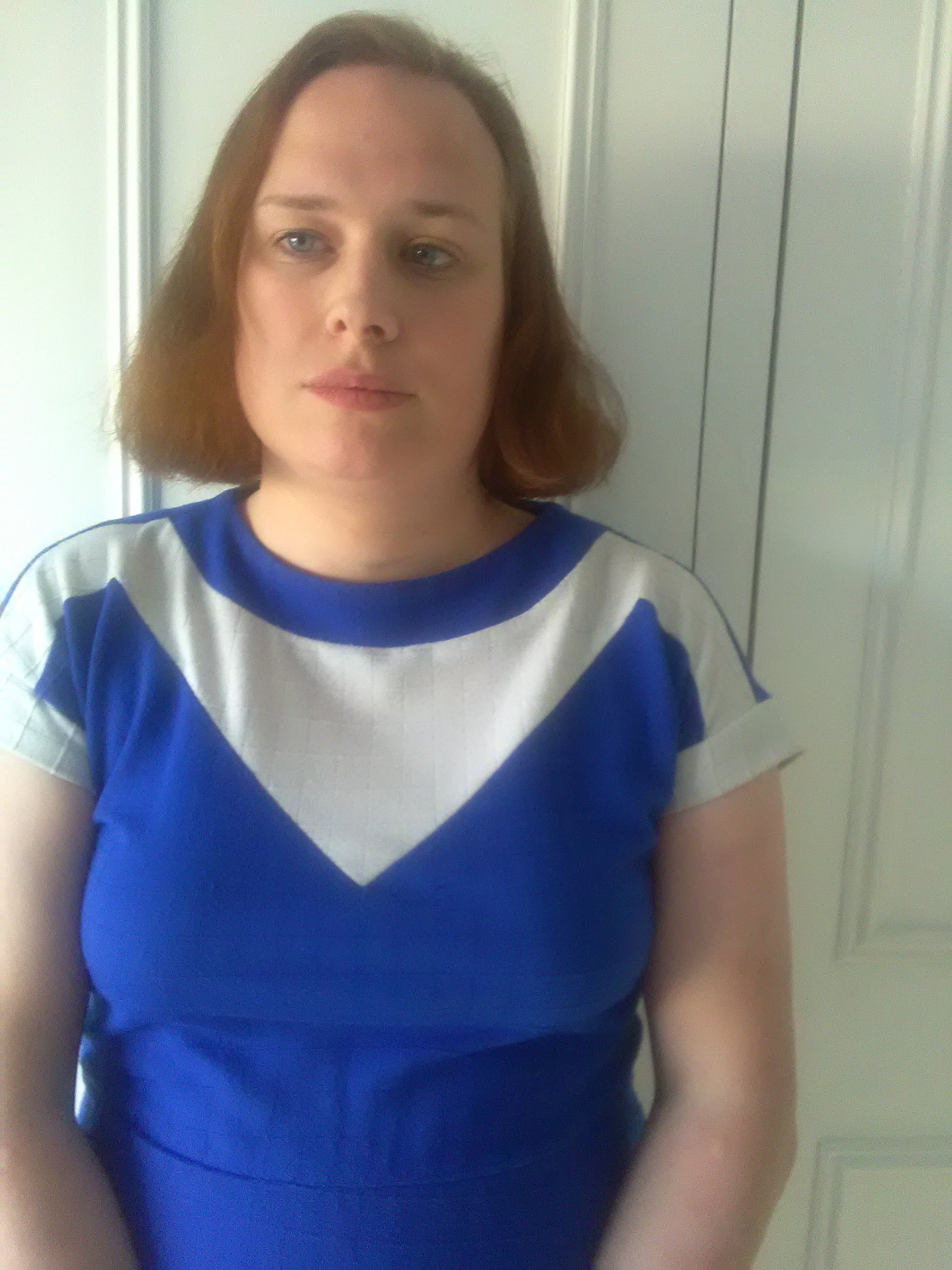
- Portrait of Jacques, May 2020
- Born: 1981 (age 44–45); Redhill, Surrey, England
- Education: The College of Richard Collyer; University of Sussex (MA, PhD)
- Notable work: Monaco
- Website: julietjacques.com

Juliet Jacques (/ˈdʒeɪks/ JAYKS, born 3 October 1981) is an English writer, journalist and filmmaker.

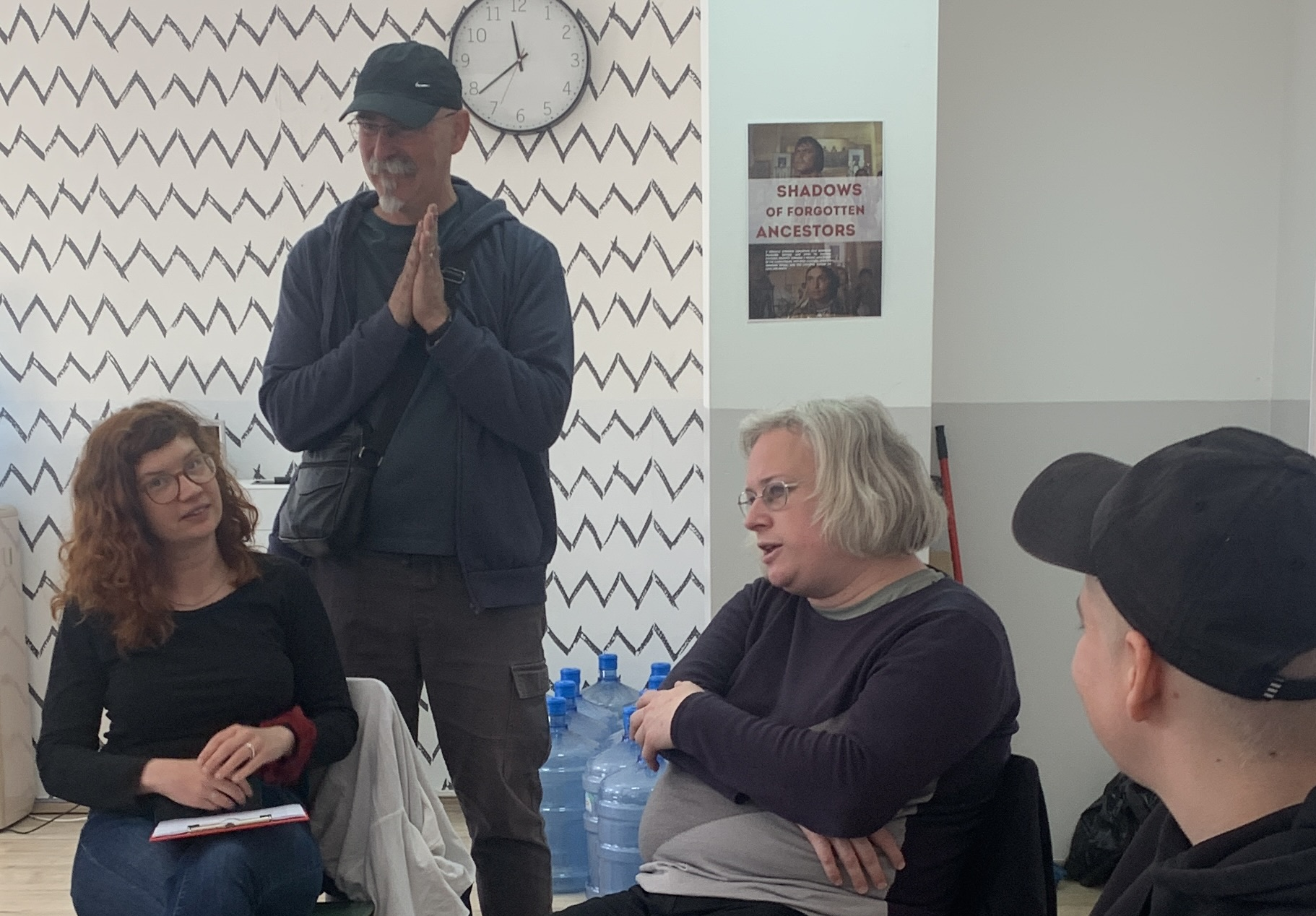
Jacques giving a talk to a Queer Union group at UWC Mostar in 2026

== Education ==
Jacques did her A-Levels at the College of Richard Collyer in Horsham, before studying History at the University of Manchester. Jacques studied at the University of Sussex, completing a Master's degree in Literature & Visual Culture before a PhD in Creative and Critical Writing.

== Writing ==
Trans: A Memoir was published by Verso Books in 2015, based on a series of blog posts called A Transgender Journey that Jacques wrote for The Guardian in 2010–2012, chronicling gender reassignment on the NHS. The audiobook was narrated by trans actor Rebecca Root.

Her next book, Variations - a collection of short stories about the history of trans and non-binary people in the United Kingdom - was published by Influx Press in 2021. Front Lines: Trans Journalism 2007-2021, an anthology of her journalism on politics, media and the arts, followed on Cipher Press in 2022.

Monaco, an illustrated novella set in the Principality, came out on Toothgrinder Press in 2023. A second fiction collection, The Woman in the Portrait: Collected Short Stories 2008-2024, was published by Cipher Press in July 2024.

== Film ==
Jacques co-directed a short film called Approach/Withdraw in 2016, with artist Ker Wallwork. She then made a short film, You Will Be Free, in 2017, inspired by American writer and actress Cookie Mueller, using archival footage and narrated by Anna-Louise Plowman. Her next film was Revivification: Art, activism and politics in Ukraine (2018), a documentary about how queer and feminist artists were responding to the Maidan revolution, the war in eastern Ukraine and the rise of far-right politics in the country.

She played herself in Josh Appignanesi's film Female Human Animal (2018).

== Awards ==
Jacques was on the longlist for the Orwell Prize in 2011 for A Transgender Journey. In 2012, she was selected as one of the Independent on Sunday Pink List's most influential journalists, and was also included in the list for 2013, 2014 and 2015. She was also included in Attitude magazine's list of 101 LGBTQ+ trailblazers in 2024. In 2016, her book Trans: A Memoir was shortlisted for Polari LGBT Literary Salon's First Book Prize Award, being chosen as runner-up. In 2019, Val McDermid chose her as one of ten British LGBT+ writers for the British Council's International Literary Showcase.

== Personal life ==
Jacques plays football, and won the Shield with the Brighton Bandits at the 2008 IGLFA World Cup. Jacques played for Surrey Women in a friendly against the Afghanistan development team in May 2022, and spent the 2022–2023 season with Clapton Community FC.

In 2020, Jacques appeared on the BBC's Christmas University Challenge as part of the University of Manchester team, which reached the final. She appeared on the programme again in 2025.
