= Channel 8 virtual TV stations in Canada =

The following television stations operate on virtual channel 8 in Canada:

- CBNT-DT in St. John's, Newfoundland and Labrador
- CFQC-DT in Saskatoon, Saskatchewan
- CFYK-DT in Yellowknife, Northwest Territories
- CHAN-DT in Vancouver, British Columbia
- CHEM-DT in Trois-Rivières, Quebec
- CIHF-DT in Halifax, Nova Scotia
- CIVA-DT-1 in Rouyn-Noranda, Quebec
- CIVV-DT in Saguenay, Quebec
- CKCW-DT-1 in Charlottetown, Prince Edward Island
