= Channel 8 virtual TV stations in Mexico =

The following television stations operate on virtual channel 8 in Mexico:

- XHBZC-TDT in La Paz, Baja California Sur
- XHTX-TDT in Tuxtla Gutiérrez, Chiapas
- XHJCI-TDT in Ciudad Juárez, Chihuahua
- XHFAMX-TDT in Mexico City
- XHRCG-TDT in Saltillo, Coahuila
- XHUNES-TDT in Durango, Durango
- XHGSM-TDT in San Miguel de Allende, Guanajuato
- XEDK-TDT in Guadalajara, Jalisco
- XHCNL-TDT in Monterrey, Nuevo León
- XHOXO-TDT (Nu9ve subchannel) in Oaxaca, Oaxaca
- XHCCU-TDT in Cancún, Quintana Roo
- XHVSL-TDT in Ciudad Valles, San Luis Potosí
- XHSLT-TDT (Nu9ve subchannel) in San Luis Potosí, San Luis Potosí
- XHUS-TDT in Hermosillo, Sonora
- XHNSS-TDT in Nogales, Sonora
- XHLL-TDT in Villahermosa, Tabasco
- XHAB-TDT in Matamoros, Tamaulipas
- XHAI-TDT in Veracruz, Veracruz
- XHY-TDT in Mérida, Yucatán
