= Channel 8 TV stations in Canada =

The following television stations broadcast on digital or analog channel 8 in Canada:

- CBNT-DT in St. John's, Newfoundland and Labrador
- CFJC-TV-5 in Williams Lake, British Columbia
- CFQC-DT in Saskatoon, Saskatchewan
- CFRN-TV-6 in Red Deer, Alberta
- CFYK-DT in Yellowknife, Northwest Territories
- CHEM-DT in Trois-Rivières, Quebec
- CIHF-DT in Halifax, Nova Scotia
- CIVA-DT-1 in Rouyn-Noranda, Quebec
- CIVV-DT in Saguenay, Quebec
- CJDC-TV-2 in Bullhead Mountain, British Columbia
- CKCK-DT in Regina, Saskatchewan
- CKCW-DT-1 in Charlottetown, Prince Edward Island

== Defunct ==
- CFCN-TV-8 in Medicine Hat, Alberta
- CFCN-TV-12 in Moyie, British Columbia
- CFCN-TV-18 in Coleman, Alberta
- CFJC-TV-3 in Merritt, British Columbia
- CFWL-TV-1 in Invermere, British Columbia
- CHBC-TV-3 in Oliver, British Columbia
- CICT-TV-1 in Drumheller, Alberta
- CITM-TV-2 in Quesnel, British Columbia
- CJOH-TV-8 in Cornwall, Ontario
- CKNX-TV in Wingham, Ontario
- CKTN-TV in Trail, British Columbia
- CKYA-TV in Fisher Branch, Manitoba
