= TV BUAP =

XHBUAP-TDT
Puebla, Puebla; Mexico
- Channels: Digital: 8 (VHF); Virtual: 18

Programming
- Subchannels: 18.1 TV BUAP

Ownership
- Owner: Benemérita Universidad Autónoma de Puebla
- Sister stations: Radio BUAP

History
- First air date: March 14, 2021

Technical information
- ERP: 17.5 kW
- Transmitter coordinates: 19°04′27.71″N 98°20′49.48″W
- Repeater(s): XHTEH-TDT 8 (VC 18) Tehuacán (1.368 kW ERP)

Links
- Website: radioytv.buap.mx

TV BUAP is the television station of the Benemérita Universidad Autónoma de Puebla (BUAP) in the state of Puebla, Mexico. It broadcasts on two transmitters, XHBUAP-TDT in Puebla City and XHTEH-TDT in Tehuacán, both on VHF channel 8 and virtual channel 18.

== History ==
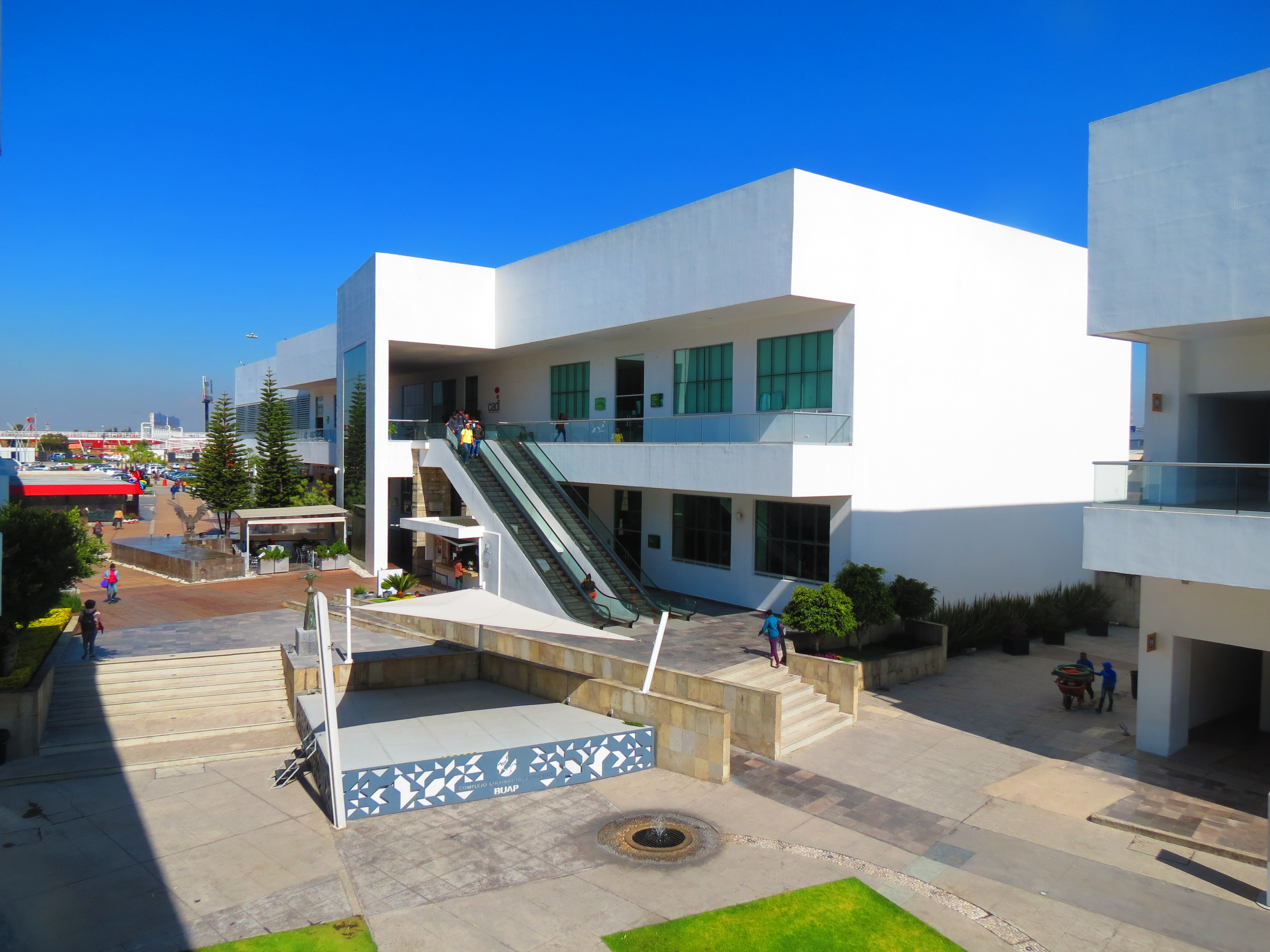
The BUAP University Cultural Complex houses TV BUAP's studios

BUAP, which has operated a radio station (XHBUAP-FM) since August 1997, filed an application for a permit television station in Puebla on March 16, 2010, and another in Tehuacán on November 15, 2011. The applications languished until they were approved for public concessions by the Federal Telecommunications Institute on June 19, 2019. Construction took place in 2020 on facilities in the University Cultural Complex, which also houses Radio BUAP. TV BUAP began broadcasting March 14, 2021. The Tehuacán transmitter began broadcasting on June 17, 2022.
