= Channel 8 low-power TV stations in the United States =

The following low-power television stations broadcast on digital or analog channel 8 in the United States:

- K08AK-D in Port Orford, etc., Oregon
- K08AP-D in Pateros/Mansfield, Washington
- K08AY-D in Winthrop-Twisp, Washington
- K08BO-D in Virgin, Utah
- K08CB-D in Lund & Preston, Nevada
- K08CW-D in Malott/Wakefield, Washington
- K08CX-D in Tonasket, Washington
- K08CY-D in Riverside, Washington
- K08EN-D in Pine Valley, etc., Utah
- K08ET-D in Durango, Colorado
- K08EZ-D in Mink Creek, Idaho
- K08FS-D in Dodson, Montana
- K08HU-D in Aleknagik, Alaska
- K08IO-D in Wells, Nevada
- K08IP-D in Baker, Montana
- K08JP-D in Dryden, Washington
- K08JV-D in Broadus, Montana
- K08KA-D in Girdwood, Alaska
- K08KD-D in Alakanuk, Alaska
- K08KO-D in Cooper Landing, Alaska
- K08KT-D in Boulder, Montana
- K08KW-D in Richland, Oregon
- K08LG-D in Silver Lake, etc., Oregon
- K08LI-D in White Sulphur Springs, Montana
- K08LL-D in Dolores, Colorado
- K08LN-D in Harrison, Nebraska
- K08LS-D in Elko, Nevada
- K08MB-D in Weber Canyon, Colorado
- K08ND-D in Akron, Colorado
- K08NQ-D in Ryndon, Nevada
- K08OB-D in Newell, California
- K08OU-D in Seattle, Washington
- K08OV-D in Nenana, Alaska
- K08OW-D in Hysham, Montana
- K08OX-D in Thomasville, Colorado
- K08OY-D in Plains, Montana
- K08OZ-D in Trout Creek, etc., Montana
- K08PC-D in Hildale, etc., Utah
- K08PE-D in Alamo, etc., Nevada
- K08PF-D in Leamington, Utah
- K08PG-D in Indian Springs, Nevada
- K08PI-D in Salmon, Montana
- K08PJ-D in Cedar City, Utah
- K08PK-D in Bullhead City, Arizona
- K08PM-D in Wagner, South Dakota
- K08PN-D in Homer, etc., Alaska
- K08PP-D in Rosebud, etc., Montana
- K08PQ-D in Big Arm/Elmo, Montana
- K08PR-D in Missoula, Montana
- K08PT-D in Bakersfield, California
- K08PW-D in Laketown, etc., Utah
- K08PX-D in Long Valley Junction, Utah
- K08PY-D in Blanding/Monticello, Utah
- K08PZ-D in Corvallis, Oregon
- K08QA-D in Aurora, etc., Utah
- K08QB-D in Crouch/Garden Valley, Idaho
- K08QC-D in Sigurd & Salina, Utah
- K08QD-D in Woodland & Kamas, Utah
- K08QE-D in Fergus Falls, Minnesota
- K08QF-D in East Price, Utah
- K08QG-D in Helper, Utah
- K08QH-D in Roosevelt, etc., Utah
- K08QL-D in Logan, Utah
- K08QM-D in Wendover, Utah
- K08QN-D in Golden Valley, Arizona
- K08QP-D in Silver City, New Mexico
- KBNI-LD in Santa Maria, California
- KEET in Hoopa, California
- KFLA-LD in Los Angeles, California
- KILA-LD in Cherry Valley, California
- KPSW-LD in Boise, Idaho
- KUCB-LD in Dutch Harbor, Alaska
- KVFR-LD in Redding, California
- KVPS-LD in Indio, California
- KWCZ-LD in Sunnyside-Grandview, Washington
- KWVC-LD in Malaga, etc., Washington
- KXMP-LD in Harrison, Arkansas
- KZDF-LD in Santa Barbara, California
- W08AT-D in Cherokee, North Carolina
- W08BF-D in Spruce Pine, North Carolina
- W08EH-D in Ponce, Puerto Rico
- W08EI-D in Guaynabo, Puerto Rico
- W08EJ-D in Anasco, Puerto Rico
- W08EQ-D in Tallahassee, Florida
- WGCT-CD in Columbus, Ohio
- WGEN-LD in Miami, Florida
- WGSC-CD in Murrells Inlet, South Carolina
- WGSI-CD in Murrells Inlet, South Carolina, uses WGSC-CD's spectrum
- WIGL-LD in Athens, Georgia
- WIIH-CD in Indianapolis, Indiana
- WOFT-LD in Ocala, Florida
- WRBD-LP in Pensacola, Florida
- WUDT-LD in Detroit, Michigan
- WVFW-LD in Miami, Florida
- WVMY-LD in Parkersburg, West Virginia
- WWVW-LD in Wheeling, West Virginia
- WXOD-LD in Palm Beach, Florida

The following low-power stations, which are no longer licensed, formerly broadcast on digital or analog channel 8:

- K08AA in Wyodak, etc., Wyoming
- K08AS in Henefer, etc., Utah
- K08AU in Spring Glen, etc., Utah
- K08AX-D in Ardenvoir, Washington
- K08BA-D in Orondo, etc., Washington
- K08BG-D in Troy, Montana
- K08CE in Kanarraville, Utah
- K08CF in Scofield, Utah
- K08CL in Koosharem, Utah
- K08CS in Roosevelt, etc., Utah
- K08CT in Duchesne, Utah
- K08EE in Potter Valley, California
- K08EQ in Seiad Valley, California
- K08ES in Red River, New Mexico
- K08FR in Aztec, New Mexico
- K08GA in Morgan, etc., Utah
- K08HJ in Orleans, California
- K08HN-D in Aspen, Colorado
- K08IA in Newberry Springs, California
- K08ID-D in Tuluksak, Alaska
- K08IE in Peoa/Oakley, Utah
- K08JD in Fruitland, Utah
- K08JE in Wanship, Utah
- K08JR in Laketown, etc., Utah
- K08JZ-D in Waunita Hot Springs, Colorado
- K08KM in Sheep Mountain, Alaska
- K08KP in Hollis, Alaska
- K08KS in King Salmon, Alaska
- K08LD in Miranda, California
- K08LW-D in Kenai/Soldotna, Alaska
- K08MC in Leamington, Utah
- K08NM in Orovada, Nevada
- K08NP-D in John Day, Oregon
- K08OR-D in Canby, California
- K08QJ-D in Rio Grande City, Texas
- KOOT-LP in Silver City, New Mexico
- KTMV-LP in Corpus Christi, Texas
- W08AB in Guayama, Puerto Rico
- W08AN in Bryson City, etc., North Carolina
- W08BH in Andrews, etc., North Carolina
- W08DP in Springfield, Illinois
- W08ED-D in Marathon, Florida
- WRAV-LP in Ocean City, Maryland
