= Hanna Yablonka =

Israeli historian and scholar

Hanna Yablonka (Hebrew: חנה יבלונקה; born 1950) is an Israeli historian and scholar. Born in Tel Aviv, she is a Professor of Holocaust Studies at Ben-Gurion University of the Negev and staff historian for the Ghetto Fighters' House.

She has been described by S. Ilan Troen and Noah Lucas as "one of the new generation of Israeli historians who have begun to systematically explore the immigration experience" during and after the establishment of Israel.

In 2002, Yad Vashem awarded Yablonka the Buchman Foundation Memorial Prize for her book on Eichmann.

In 2010, she was removed as chair of the Ministry of Education committee on history because she had criticised the teaching of history in schools.

== Published works ==
- Foreign Brethren: Holocaust Survivors in the State of Israel, 1948–1952 (Ben-Gurion University Press, 1994), translated into English by Ora Cummings as Survivors of the Holocaust: Israel after the War (New York University Press, 1999)
- The State of Israel vs. Adolf Eichmann (2001), translated into English by Ora Cummings (Schocken Books, 2004)
- As editor, with Tuvia Friling, Israel and the Holocaust (2004), Israel Studies, a Series Subject, vol. 8, no. 3, Indiana University Press, USA, 217pp.
- Off the Beaten Track: The Mizrahim and the Shoah (Yedioth Aharonoth Books and Chemed Books, 2008), translated into French by Avner Lahav as Les Juifs d'Orient, Israël et la Shoah, Calmann-Lévy, 2016.
