= Meritorious Autonomous University of Puebla =

Public university in Puebla, Mexico

- Benemérita Universidad Autónoma de Puebla
- Motto: To think well, so as to live better (Pensar bien, para vivir mejor)
- Type: Public
- Established: 15 April 1578 as Colegio del Espíritu Santo; 4 April 1937 as University of Puebla
- Affiliations: ANUIES, CUDI, CONAHEC, CUMEX
- Rector: Maria Lilia Cedillo Ramírez
- Students: 117,512 (2022)
- Undergraduates: 51,089 (2010)
- Postgraduates: 3,336 (2018)
- Location: Puebla, Puebla, Mexico; 19.000742°N 98.200512°W
- Campus: Both rural and urban
- Mascot: Wolves (Lobos)
- Website: www.buap.mx

The Meritorious Autonomous University of Puebla (Spanish: Benemérita Universidad Autónoma de Puebla) (BUAP) is the oldest and largest university in Puebla, Mexico. Founded on 15 April 1578 as Colegio del Espíritu Santo, the school was sponsored by the Society of Jesus during most of the Spanish colonial era before turning into a public college in 1825 and eventually into a public university in 1937. The religious origins can be seen in many of BUAP's buildings in Puebla city centre, which were once colonial-era churches.

The flagship campus is located in the city of Puebla, although more than nine facilities are distributed across the state. Currently, it is one of the 105 institutes participating in the Alice Experiment at CERN.

== History ==
The university was founded as a Jesuit college under the name Colegio del Espíritu Santo in 1578 and ran until the expulsion of the order in 1767. It then became the Real Colegio Carolino in 1790, after a period when the buildings were used for diverse purposes, including a military barracks. When the Jesuits returned to Mexico in 1820, they once again took over the running of the college as the Real Colegio del Espíritu Santo, de San Gerónimo y San Ignacio de La Compañía de Jesús, which on Mexican independence the following year became the Imperial Colegio de San Ignacio, San Gerónimo y Espíritu Santo. In 1825 it was removed from the control of the church authorities and taken under state control, becoming the Colegio del Estado, although the rectors continued to be priests.

On 4 April 1939, the college was raised to a university as Universidad de Puebla. However, it was not until almost twenty years later that it gained autonomy from government control as Universidad Autónoma de Puebla under legislation passed on 23 November 1956. It was renamed Benemérita Universidad Autónoma de Puebla in 1987.

== Organization ==
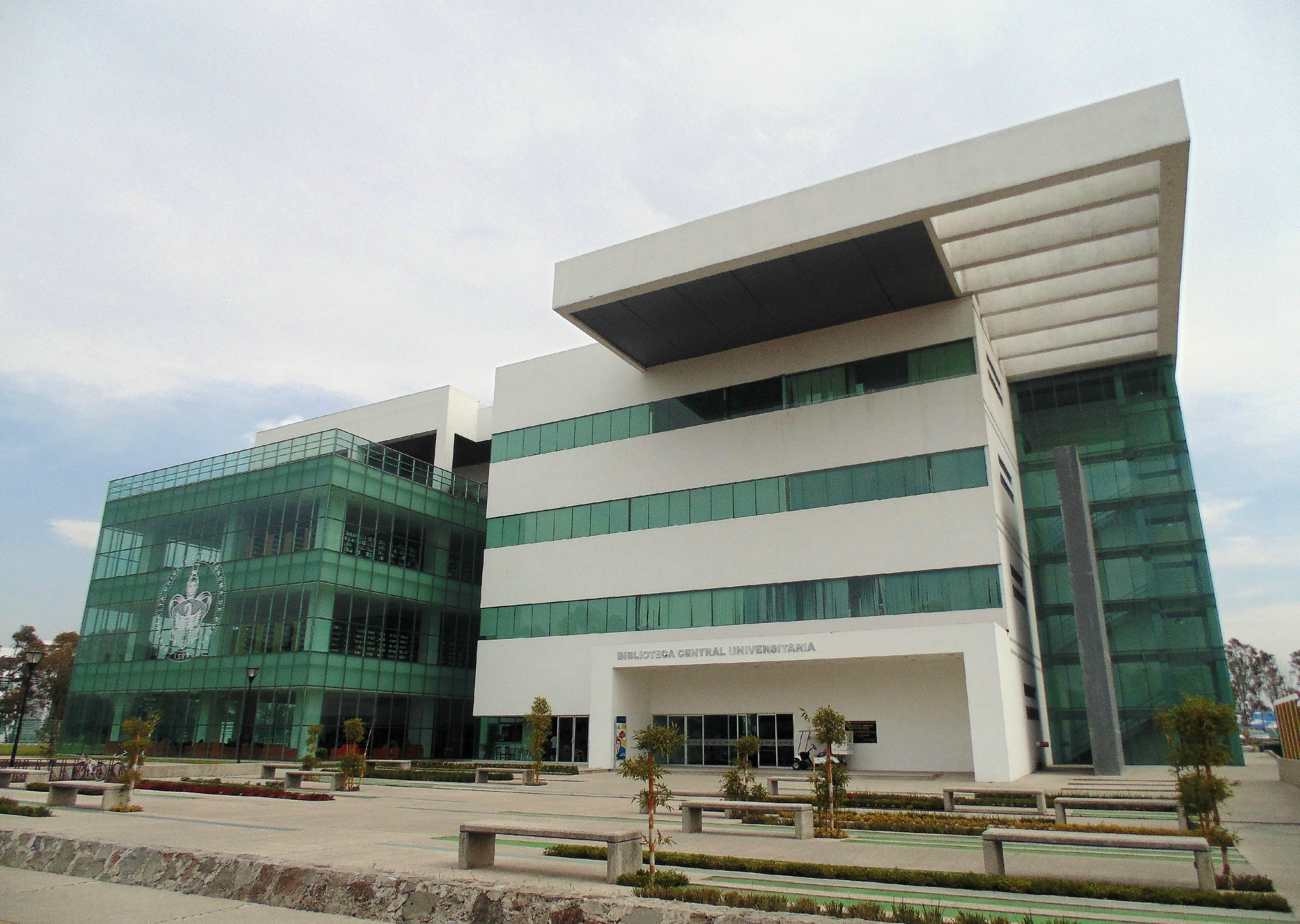
Meritorious Autonomous University of Puebla Central Library

The institution's motto is: "Pensar bien para vivir mejor" (Spanish for "To think well, so as to live better"). Its logo features a phoenix on a shield. Above the shield is the Greek goddess of knowledge, Athena. As a public institution, the university receives government funding, but the use of the word autonomous means that it is free to change its programs as it sees fit. As a macrouniversity, 34% of the students in higher level in Puebla attend the BUAP.

== Athletics ==
The sport teams of the university are named the Lobos (Wolves) BUAP. There are several sport facilities through the state for the students to take part in. The BUAP takes part in different competitions with representative teams in them.

The Lobos de la BUAP soccer team was affiliated with the university and featured some of its students. They played in the Liga de Balompié Mexicano.

== Campus ==
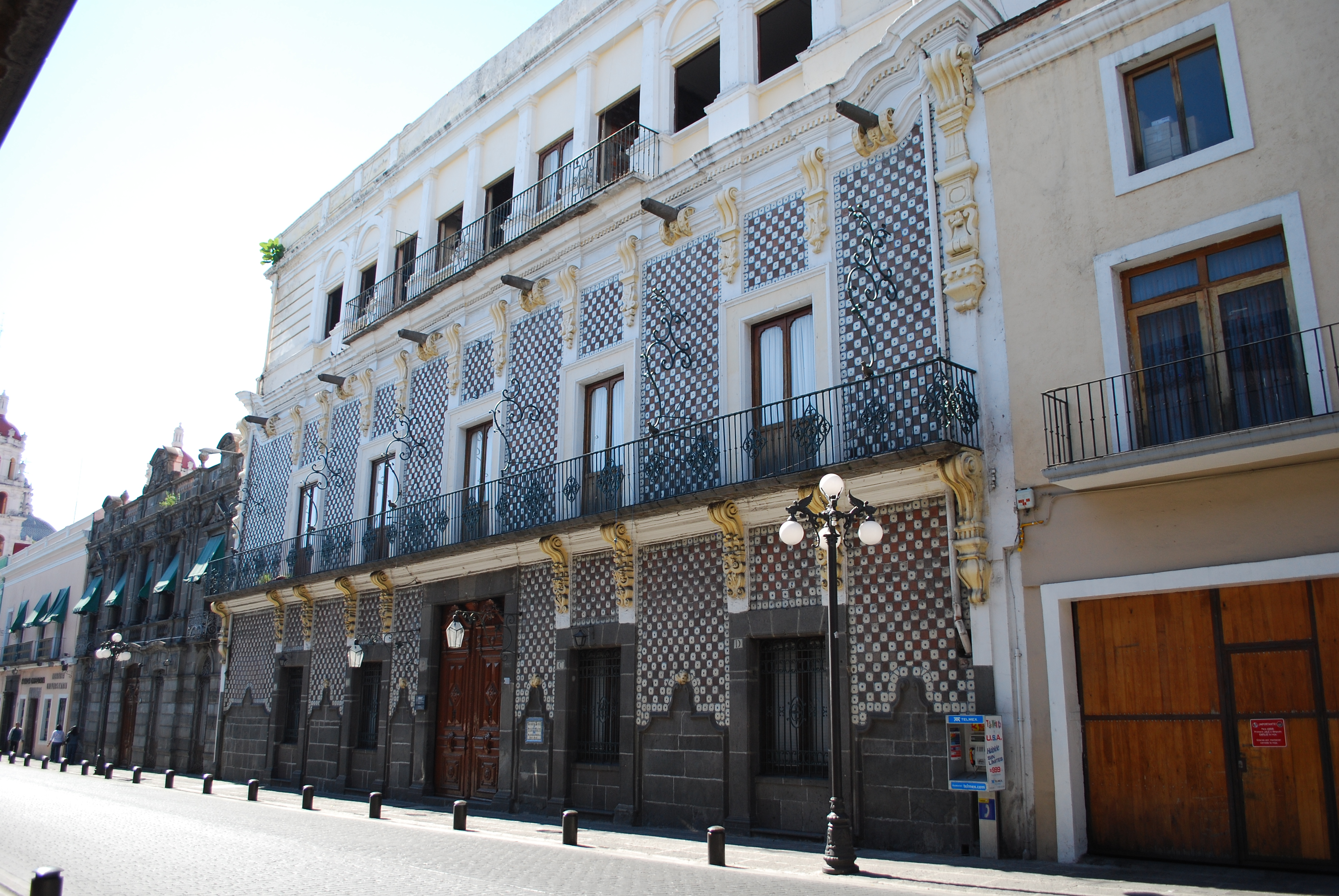
Direction of Libraries for BUAP in the historic center of Puebla

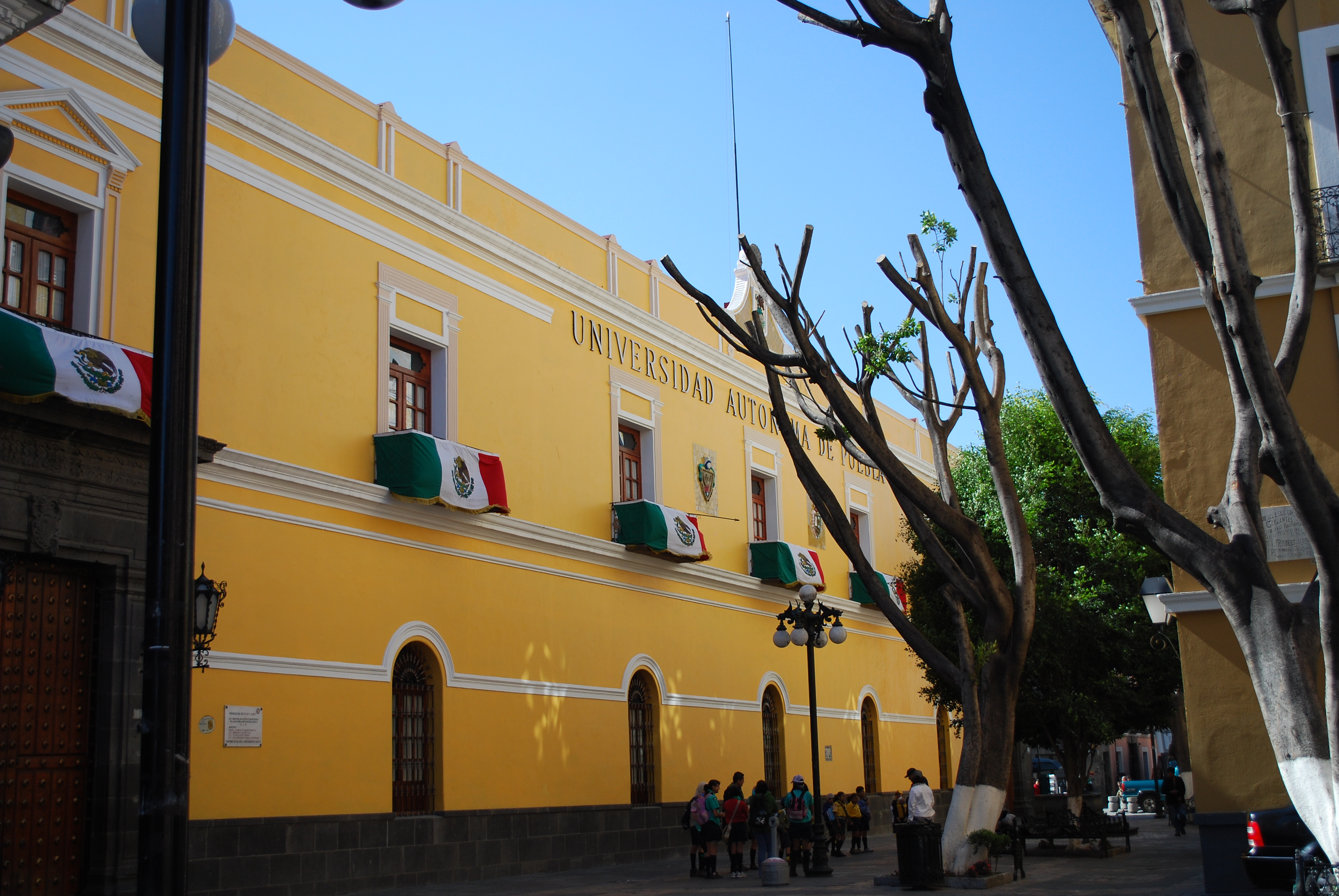
Universidad Autónoma de Puebla building in the historic center of Puebla, Mexico

BUAP has several campuses located throughout the state to satisfy student needs. In Puebla City, there are five main zones in which the BUAP operates: the "Área Centro"(Center Area), located in downtown Puebla and featuring many colonial-era buildings; The "Ciudad Universitaria" (University City), located in the Southeast zone in Puebla city, and it is where the main headquarters of the BUAP are; the "Área Salud" (Health Area), which includes the University Hospital; the "Angelópolis Area" (Angelopolis Area) the University's Cultural Complex; and, since 2024 "Ciudad Universitaria 2" located in the auxiliary council of San Pedro Zacachimalpa, municipality of Puebla. In addition, the university administers six high schools in Puebla City.

Along with them, the university has nine regional sections which operate in some of the biggest cities in Puebla State, and are: Acatzingo, Atlixco, Chiautla, Chignahuapan, Cuetzalan, Libres, Tehuacán, Tetela de Ocampo, and Zacapoaxtla.

Finally, the BUAP three "foreign academic units" in the cities of Tecamachalco, La Magdalena Tlatlauquitepec and Teziutlan. These are operated near full autonomy.

== Media ==
The university operates Radio BUAP with transmitters in Puebla since 1997, Tehuacán and Chignahuapan, and television station TV BUAP with transmitters in Puebla and Tehuacán.

== See also ==
- List of Jesuit sites
- List of universities in Mexico
