= Channel 8 Corporation =

Kurdish Media Corporation

Channel 8 Media Corporation
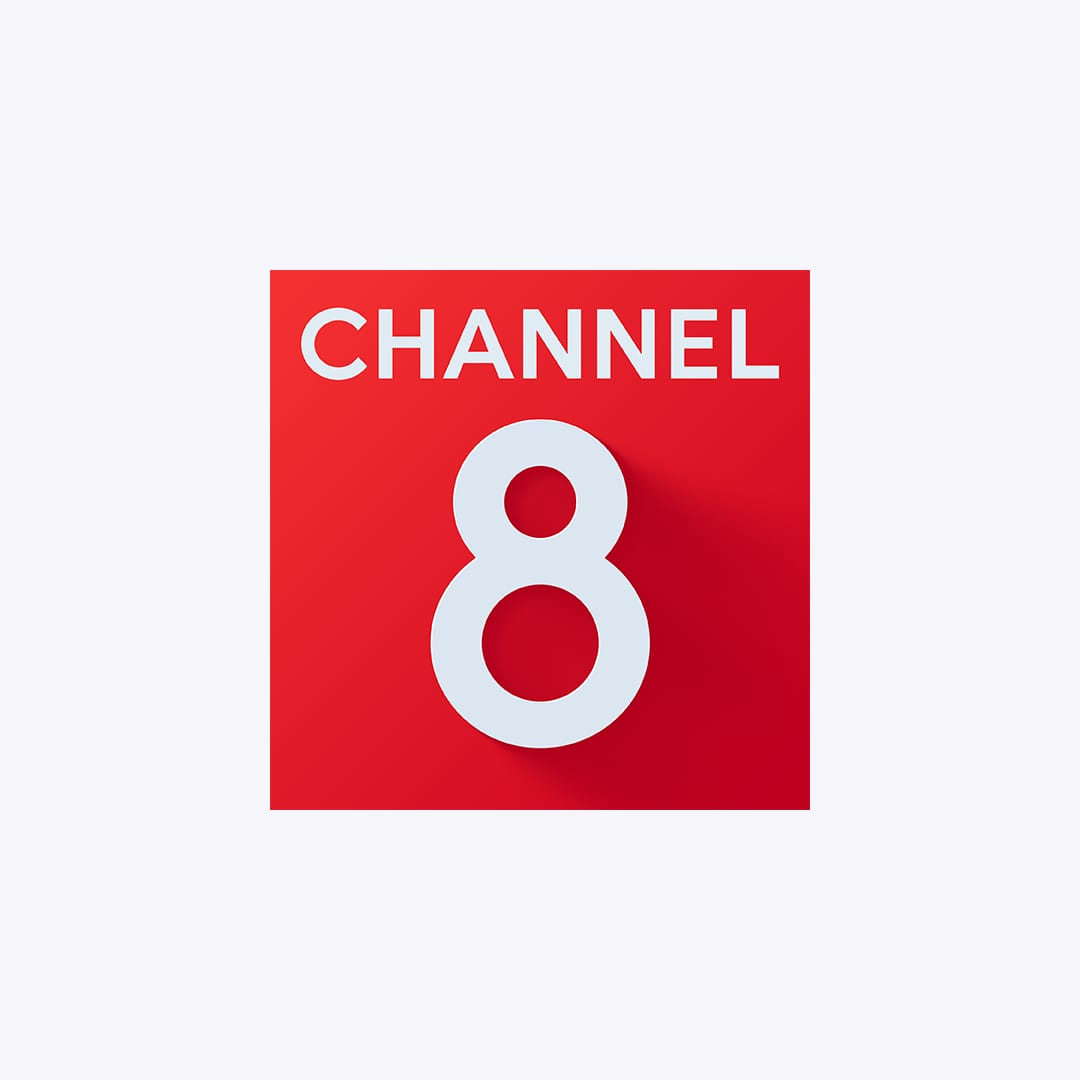
- The Logo of Channel 8 Corporation.
- Native name: دامەزراوەی میدیایی کەناڵ ٨
- Founded: Sulaymaniyah, Kurdistan Region, Iraq (2023)
- Founders: Ahmed Najm
- Headquarters: Sulaymaniyah, Kurdistan Region, Iraq
- Key people: Chairman Ahmed Najm
- Website: channel8.com/english

Channel 8 Media Corporation ( Sorani Kurdish: دامەزراوەی میدیایی کەناڵ ٨ / Kurdish: Korporasyona medyayê ya Kanal 8 ) (established 2023) is a media corporation in Kurdistan Region, Iraq. It is headquartered in Sulaymaniyah. It operates through two television channels broadcasting in Kurdish and Arabic, a digital platform with content in Central Kurdish (Sorani Kurdish), Kurmanji Kurdish, English, Arabic, Turkish, and Persian, alongside a radio station and a research center.

== History ==
Although it was established in 2023, Channel 8 did not officially launch until later on January 18, 2024. the broadcasting network was officially launched on January 18, 2024, 8 P.M. local time (GMT+3).

== Channel 8 research center ==
Channel 8 has a research center by the name of (iNNOV8).

=== iNNOV8 ===
iNNOV8 was established in 2023 with its director being Imad A Farhadi. It is headquartered in Sulaymaniyah. and its research focuses on a variety of topics including digital technology, climate change, security, public health, and private sector development.

==== iNNOV8 environment week ====
On May 30, 2026, iNNOV8 announced the launch of iNNOV8 Environment Week. a multidisciplinary initiative dedicated to exploring how environmental challenges intersect with governance, gender, and sustainable development in the Kurdistan Region and Iraq, the initiative lasting a week.

== Awards ==
Channel 8 secured two international gold awards and one bronze for excellence in television branding. Recognized by Germany's NYX Awards and Eyes & Ears Europe.

== Controversy ==
Since its creation Channel 8 has been accused of having affiliations with The Patriotic Union of Kurdistan and its president Bafel Talabani. Ahmed Najm, (Founder & Chairman of Channel 8) has close relations and ties with PUK president, Bafel Talabani and was Bafel Talabani's Head of Media Office.

=== Ahmed Najm's arrest warrant ===
Controversy surrounding Channel 8 and its chairman Ahmed Najm got heated after a letter signed by Rebar Ahmed, the minister of interior of the Kurdistan Regional Government which issued an arrest warrant for Ahmed Najm that went public. The arrest warrant was issued based on Article 2 of the Mobile Phone Abuse Law of The KRG.

Issuing an arrest warrant for Bzhar Dabagh, a presenter on Channel 8 and Ahmed Najm, the chairman of the Channel 8 board was criticized and the warrant was deemed a "political decision" due of rivalry and political tensions between the PUK and the PDK. This becomes more clear since the KRG minister of interior has issued an arrest warrant but the police of Sulaymaniyah have not followed the minister's order and have not arrested the two. Once again the situation was deemed as political and not ethical.
