= United World College in Mostar =

United World College in Mostar (UWCiM)
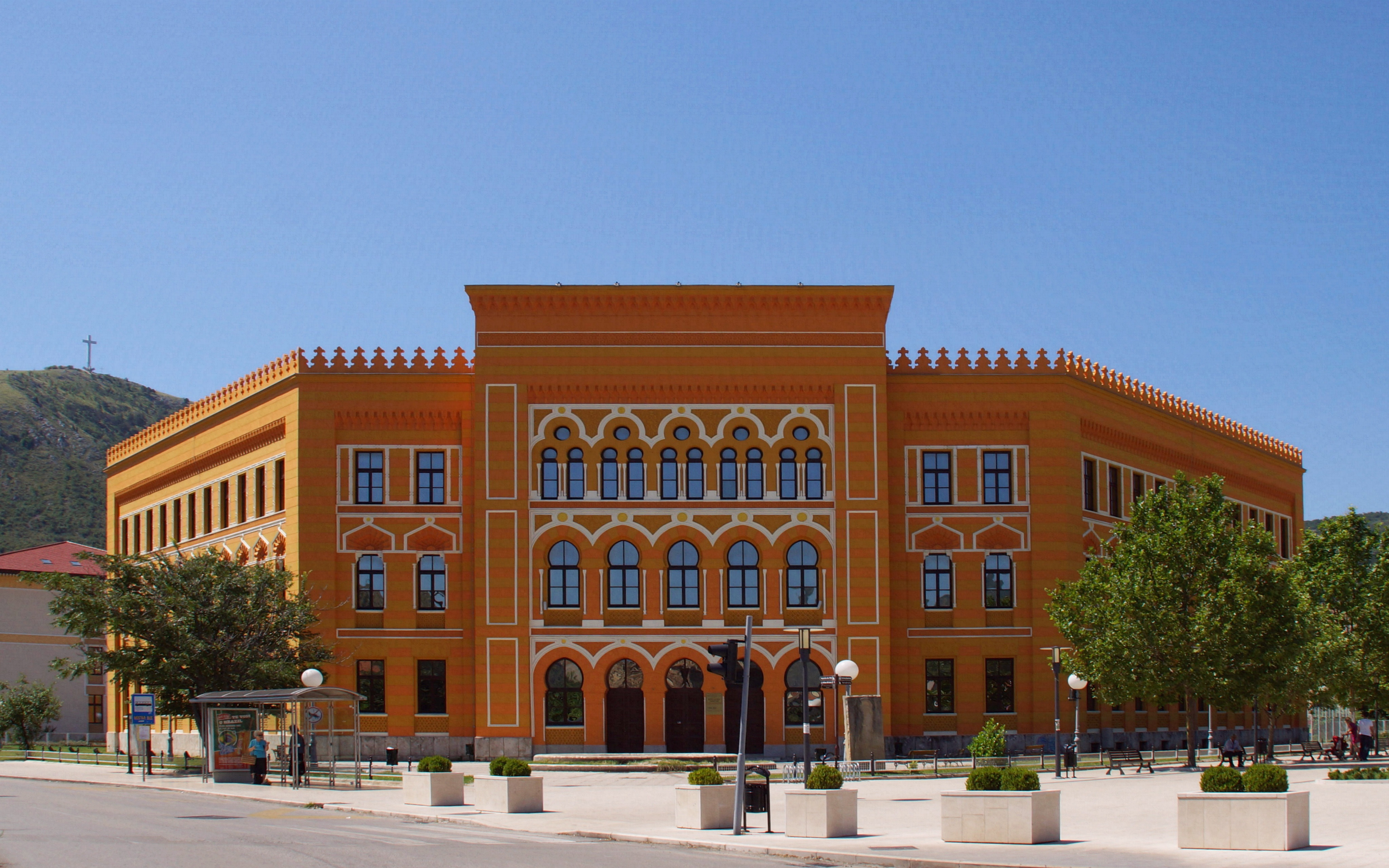

Location
- Mostar,, Herzegovina-Neretva Canton; Bosnia and Herzegovina; 43.343007°N 17.807290°E

Information
- Type: International Baccalaureate
- Motto: Building bridges between people, nations and cultures.
- Established: September 2006
- President: Elisabeth Rehn
- Head teacher: Hendrik Flier
- Enrollment: 165 up to 200
- Campus type: Open urban campus
- Affiliation: United World Colleges
- Website: http://www.uwcmostar.ba

The United World College in Mostar (UWC Mostar) (Bosnian/Croatian/Serbian: Koledž Ujedinjenog svijeta u Mostaru) is a part of the United World College, founded by Elisabeth Rehn (UN Special Rapporteur on the Secretary General for the United Nations Mission in Bosnia-Herzegovina 1995-1999) and Lamija Tanović (Chair, Humanity in Action Bosnia and Herzegovina) in 2006 and officially opened by Queen Noor of Jordan. UWC Mostar is the first UWC with an explicit aim to contribute to the reconstruction of a post-conflict society and also the first to be housed within an existing public school (see also Education in Bosnia and Herzegovina). UWC Mostar is the twelfth college in the United World Colleges family, and the fourth college in Europe.

UWC Mostar was founded as a joint initiative of UWC and the International Baccalaureate Organization, with the aim to support the peace process in the country and the region. From January 2011, UWC Mostar is part of Foundation Education in Action which is a legal successor of UWC-IB Initiative in Bosnia and Herzegovina. The chair of the Governing Board is Pilvi Torsti, Chair of the College Board is Jasminka Bratić (who is also a member of the school's Governing Board).

As consequence of the Bosnian War, Gymnasium Mostar - with which UWC Mostar shares a building - teaches two national separate secondary school curricula, intended for Croat and Bosniak students. UWC Mostar students come from all ethnic groups in Bosnia and Herzegovina as well as from the region and abroad. All students live, study and serve the community together, creating a unique example of integrated education in post-war Bosnia and Herzegovina.

The college also serves as the Centre for Professional Development of Teachers in Bosnia and Herzegovina who receive training in international educational standards.

Students at the college are eligible, upon graduation, to participate in the Davis United World College Scholars Program, which funds undergraduate study for UWC students at selected universities in the United States.

== Location ==
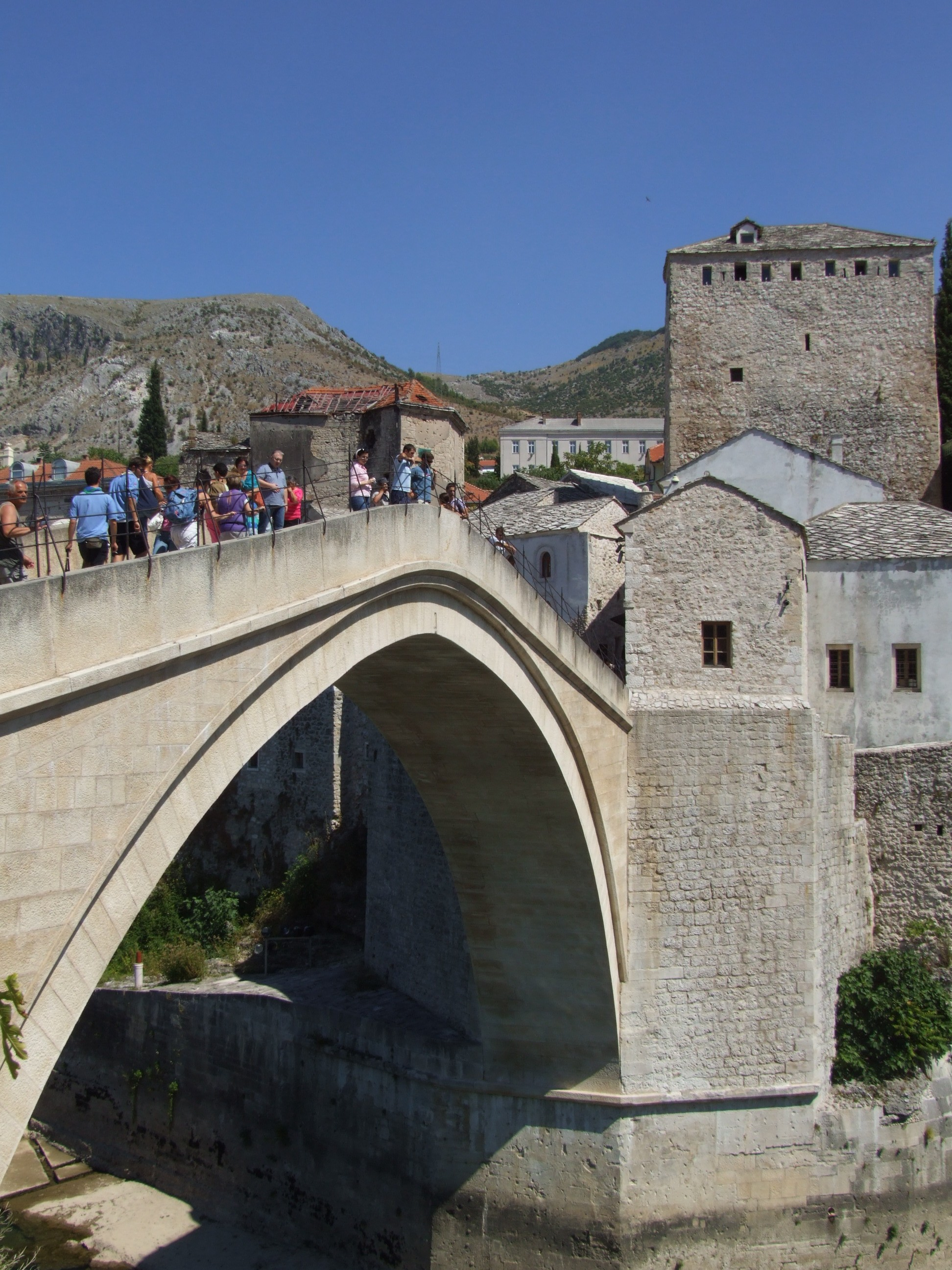
The Old Bridge in Mostar

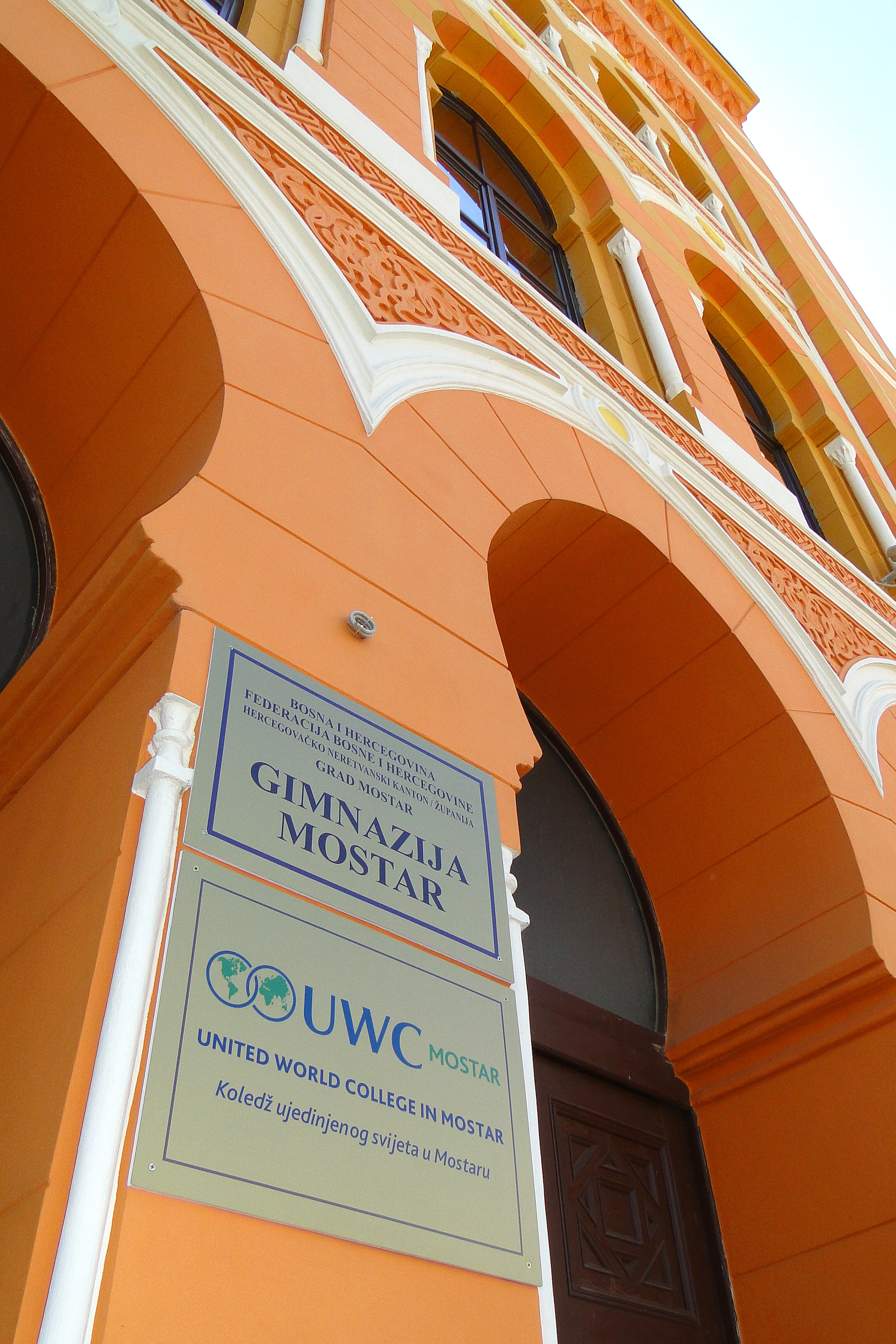
The building shared by the Mostar Gymnasium and UWC Mostar

The UWC Mostar is located in Mostar, which is the centre of Herzegovina, an historic region of Bosnia and Herzegovina. Mostar is widely known by the famous Old Bridge (Stari Most), originally built in 1566, destroyed by HVO forces during the Bosnian War in 1993 and rebuilt in 2004. Mostar was chosen for hosting UWC as a striking example of the post-war ethnic division and tensions.

The UWC Mostar is located in the city center of the city of Mostar. The college, with 165-200 students, shares a building with Gimnazija Mostar (approx. 650 students). Before the war this school, also known as the Old Gymnasium, built in 1898 - 1902 during the Austro-Hungarian rule in Bosnia and Herzegovina, was known as one of the finest schools in the former Yugoslavia.

UWC Mostar does not have an isolated campus - students live in five residences in different parts of the City of Mostar.

== IB DP curriculum ==
UWC Mostar is an IB World School since September 2006. It offers International Baccalaureate Diploma Programme (IB DP) in English. In the school year 2017/2018 UWC Mostar runs these IB Courses:

- IB Group 1 Language A1: Bosnian A1, Croatian A1, Serbian A1, English A1 - Literature, English A1 - Language and literature, German A1; Irish A1 other languages may be taken as "self-taught" subjects.
- IB Group 2 Language Acquisition: English B, German B, German Ab Initio, Spanish B, Spanish Ab Initio.
- IB Group 3 Individuals and Societies: Economics, History, Anthropology, Global Politics, and the interdisciplinary course Environmental Systems and Societies.
- IB Group 4 Sciences: Biology, Chemistry, Physics, and ESS.
- IB Group 5 Mathematics: Mathematics Analysis and Approaches Standard Level, Mathematics Analysis and Approaches Higher Level, Mathematics Analysis and Interpretations Standard Level
- IB Group 6 Arts: Visual Arts, Theatre Arts.

Creativity, Action, Service- CAS Programme

Creativities: Astronomy, Chess (Kissi), Podcast, UWC Dialogues, Amnesty, Desert Cooking, Romance languages, Poetry, 3D Modelling, Crocheting, Runway Modelling, Drawing, Yearbook, Newspaper, Global Awareness.

Actions: Volleyball, Basketball, Tennis, Football, Outdoor Leadership, Modern Dance, Ballroom Dance, Latin Dance, Contemporary Dance, Traditional Dance, Yoga, Half-Marathon preparation, Gymnastics, Silking, Climbing.

(Social) Services: Kindergarten Radobolja, SOS Kindergarten and Family Centre, Home for children without parental care "Egyptian Village", Centre for people with special needs "Los Rosales", Caritas’ Centre for children with Special Needs "Holy Family", Primary School for Children with Special Needs, Refugee camp Tasovčić, Ecology Group, "Erase the Hate" dedicated to removing swastikas around the city, UWC Mostar Labs and Library maintenance, IT lab lessons, Mostar Peer Support (MOPS), UWC Mostar Green House, Parent’s Association of children with Special needs "Sunce", Amnesty International Group, Fun with Elderly

== Student body ==
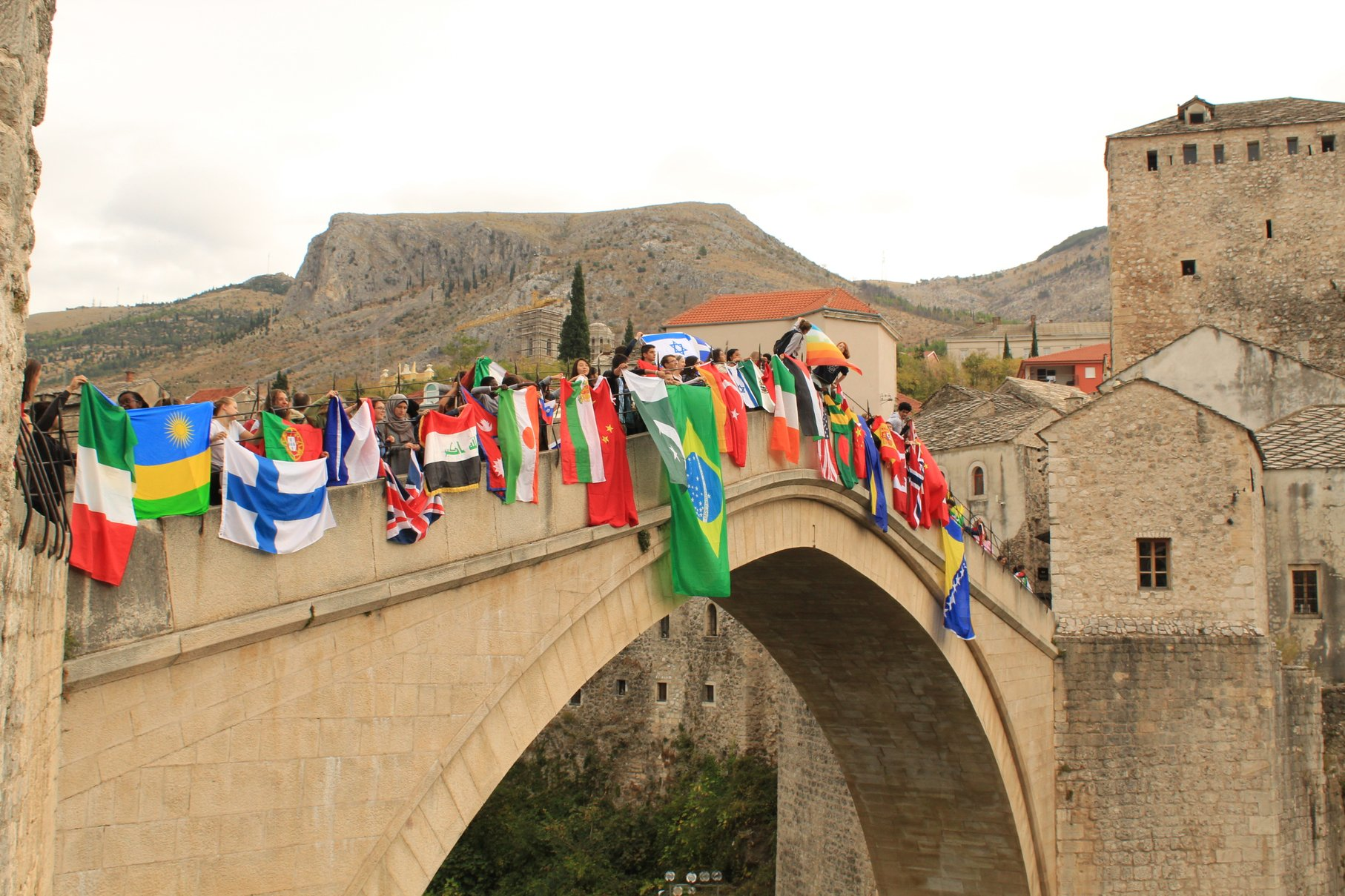
Students of UWC Mostar displaying their country flags from the Stari Most bridge on 7 October 2018

In academic year 2022/2023 the College is attended by 204 students from 72 countries of the world.

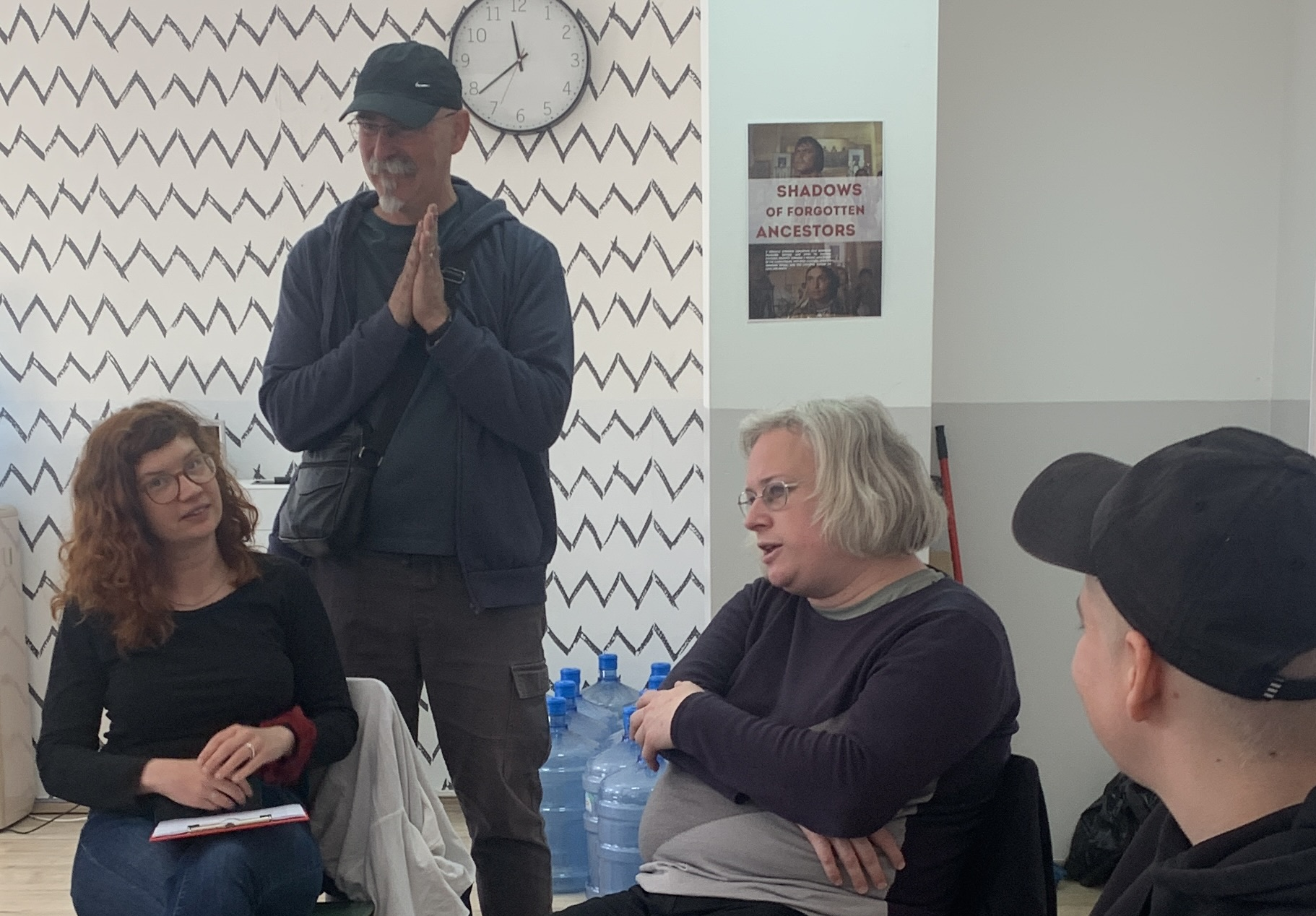
Juliet Jacques giving a talk to a student group in 2026

== Head teachers ==
- 2006–2010: Paul Regan
- 2010–2018: Valentina Mindoljević
- 2018–2019: Mark Feltham
- 2019–2021: Dženan Hakalović (Acting Head)
- 2021–2025: Sonia Rawat
- 2025-: Hendrik Flier
