= Chignahuapan =

- Town and Municipality
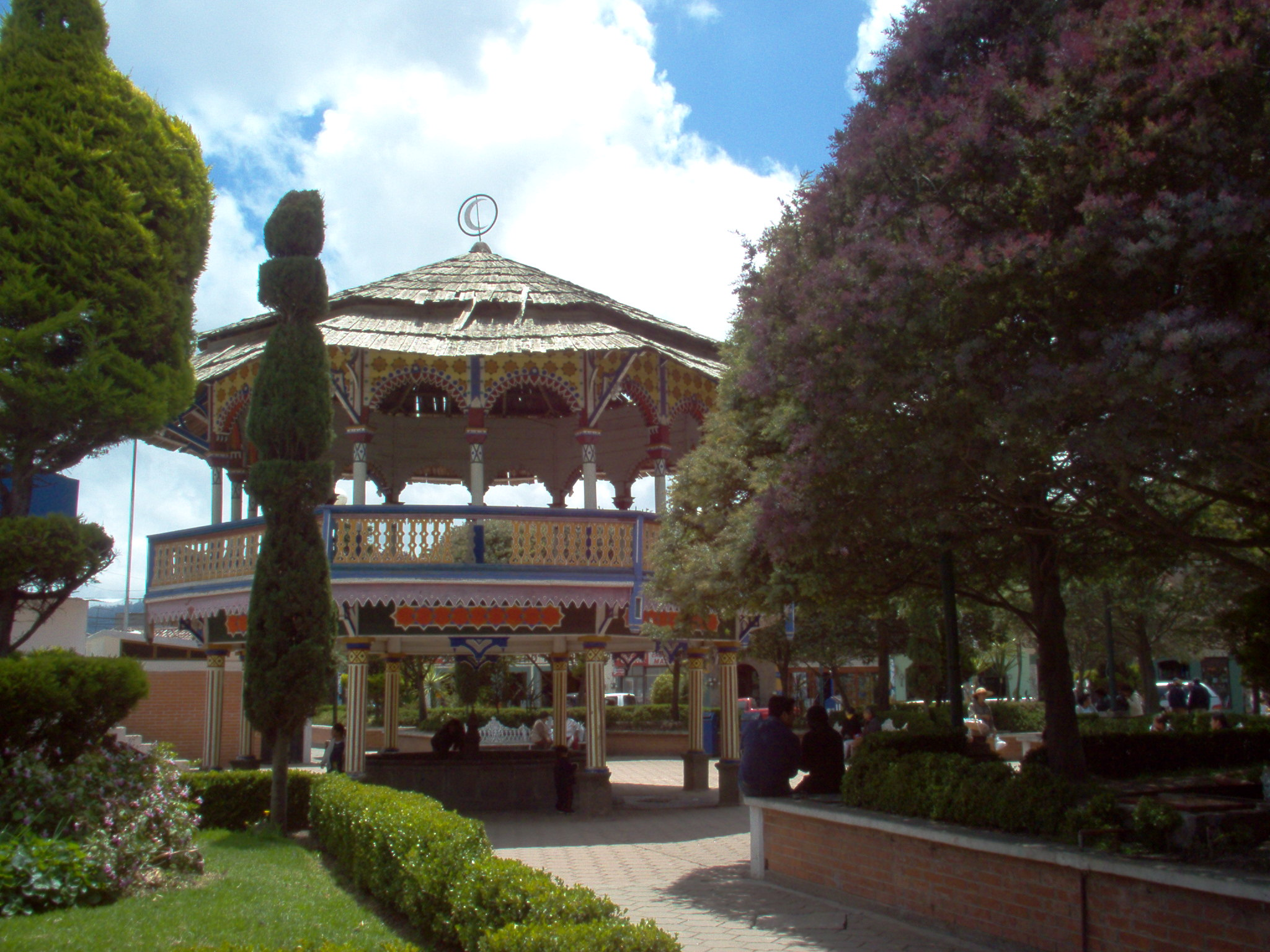

- Coat of arms

- Location of the municipality in Puebla

- Location within Mexico Location within Puebla (state)
- Coordinates: 19°50′N 98°02′W
- Country: Mexico
- State: Puebla

Population (2020)
  - Total: 66,464
- Time zone: UTC-6 (Zona Centro)
- Website: http://www.chignahuapan.gob.mx/

Chignahuapan (Spanish pronunciation: [tʃiɣnaˈwapan]) is a town in the Mexican state of Puebla. It serves as the seat of the surrounding municipality of the same name. The municipality is the location of many touristic places very well known all over the state such as the Basilica of the Immaculate Conception, which is the biggest figure of the virgin Mary in Latin America, and also, Las Aguas Termales de Chignahuapan (thermal waters).

The main economy of Chignahuapan is making Christmas baubles.

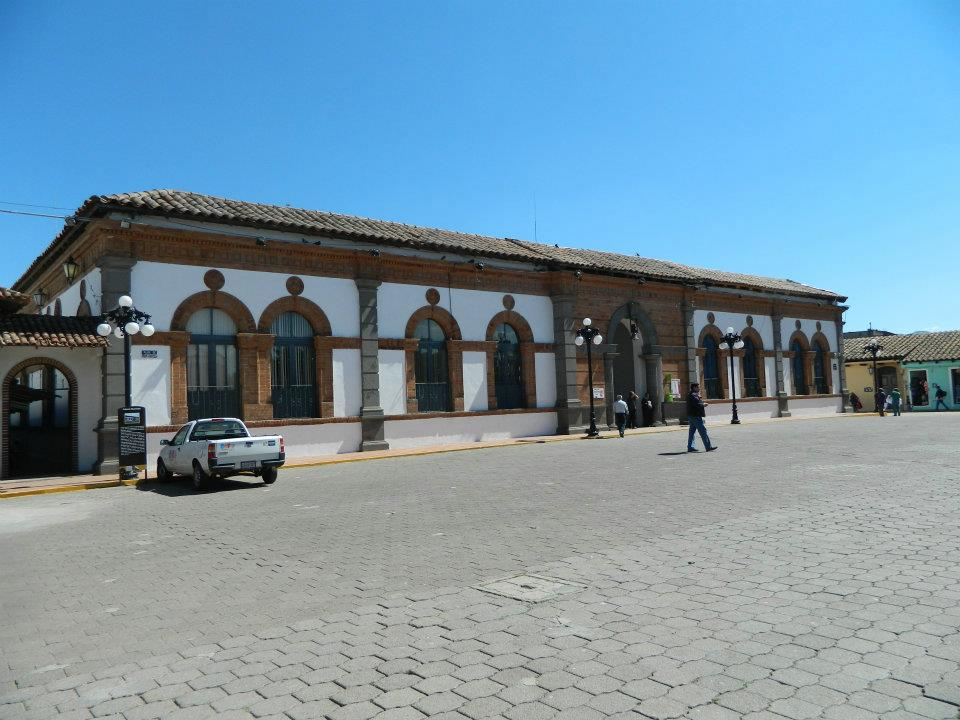
Government building of the municipality.

The BUAP has a Regional Section there.

In 2026 amidst the Mexican drug war a shoot out killed 5 people here.
