= DTV-8 =

- Country: Guyana
- Broadcast area: National
- Headquarters: New Amsterdam

Programming
- Language: English

Ownership
- Owner: Dave's Portrait Studio

History
- Launched: 22 December 1993

Links
- Website: https://dtv8.net/

Availability

Terrestrial
- UHF: Analog VHF 8

Dave's Television Channel 8, also known as DTV-8 or Berbice Super Station, is a Guyanese family-owned television station. The station is owned by Dave's Portrait Studio and covers the Berbice region. Its longtime slogan is Television for the entire family.

== History ==
The station was founded by David "Dave" Rambarran and started broadcasting on 22 December 1993, eight years after his company (founded in 1947) started a video production unit. In its early years, the station produced a variety of local programs, such as Know your County, Teen Rap, the satirical year-end series Berbice Lampoon, Here in Berbice among others. The news operation started with a reduced bulletin DTV-8 News Digest hosted by a husband-and-wife team, before starting a full live newscast Prime News, which was the first to include a birthday segment and helped popularize the concept of death announcements on Guyanese television, which later spread to other stations. It was the first in Berbice and among the first in Guyana to do live outside broadcasts.

DTV8 aired graphic footage of an accident on No 19 Public Road on 29 October. Stephen Merai condemned the footage, titling it as "nasty" and that the station should be more professional to avoid such footage. The station claimed that Merai's comments were out of context and a disclaimer aired before the footage.

For its 20th anniversary in December 2013, the station held a series of activities, including donations to charities and a church, a call-in competition and a one-hour program presented by Gregory Rambarran about its creation. At the time, it was the only station in Berbice with the ability of producing live outside broadcasts and had reception in regions 4 and 5. There were claims that its signal was also received in Essequibo. On October 9, 2014, it held a joint blood drive with the All Saints Anglican Church, attracting 41 volunteers.
