= Gretchen (disambiguation) =

Gretchen is a female given name.

Gretchen may also refer to:

- Gretchen (band), a female-fronted alternative rock band
- Gretchen (film), a 2006 film
- Gretchen (play), an 1879 play by W. S. Gilbert based on the Faust legend
- Gretchen (singer) (born 1959), Brazilian singer and dancer
- Hurricane Gretchen, three tropical cyclones in the Eastern Pacific Ocean
- USS Gretchen, the name of more than one United States Navy ship
- Gretchen Goes to Nebraska, a 1990 album by King's X, often called Gretchen
