= List of television stations in Sinaloa =

The following is a list of all CRT-licensed over-the-air television stations broadcasting in the Mexican state of Sinaloa. There are 22 television stations in Sinaloa.

== List of television stations ==
RF	VC	Call sign	Location	Network/name	ERP	Concessionaire
32	1	XHCUA-TDT	Culiacán	Azteca Uno (adn40)	36.7 kW	Televisión Azteca
23	2	XHBT-TDT	Culiacán	Las Estrellas (FOROtv)	155 kW	Televimex
33	3	XHCTCI-TDT	Culiacán	Imagen Televisión (Excélsior TV)	100 kW	Cadena Tres I, S.A. de C.V.
24	5	XHCUI-TDT	Culiacán	Canal 5 (9.1 Nu9ve)	155 kW	Radio Televisión
35	7	XHDO-TDT	Culiacán	Azteca 7 (a+)	52.85 kW	Televisión Azteca
30	10	XHQ-TDT	Culiacán	TVP	120 kW	T.V. de Culiacán
21	11	XHCPDI-TDT	Culiacán	Canal Once (Once Niñas y Niños)	44.45 kW	Instituto Politécnico Nacional
9	12	XHCPAR-TDT	Culiacán	Antena Lince	19.998 kW	Universidad Autónoma de Occidente
27	1	XHMSI-TDT	Los Mochis	Azteca Uno (adn40)	45.49 kW	Televisión Azteca
25	2	XHBS-TDT	Los Mochis; Cd. Obregón, Son. (RF 30)	Las Estrellas (FOROtv)	110 kW; 200 kW	Televimex
33	3	XHCTLM-TDT	Los Mochis	Imagen Televisión (Excélsior TV)	50.496 kW	Cadena Tres I, S.A. de C.V.
29	5/9	XHLMI-TDT	Los Mochis	Canal 5 (Nu9ve)	110 kW	Radio Televisión
31	7	XHMIS-TDT	Los Mochis	Azteca 7 (a+)	77.37 kW	Televisión Azteca
32	10	XHI-TDT (Note: While XHI Los Mochis is licensed as a repeater of its Ciudad Obregón station, XHI Los Mochis features significant local content and often has a different schedule compared to Ciudad Obregón.)	Los Mochis	TVP	19.996 kW	Televisora del Yaqui
21	11	XHSIM-TDT	Los Mochis	Canal Once (Once Niñas y Niños)	218.51 kW	Instituto Politécnico Nacional
34	1	XHLSI-TDT	Mazatlán	Azteca Uno (adn40)	38.31 kW	Televisión Azteca
25	2	XHOW-TDT	Mazatlán	Las Estrellas (FOROtv)	118 kW	Televimex
21	3	XHCTMZ-TDT	Mazatlán	Imagen Televisión (Excélsior TV)	34.656 kW	Cadena Tres I, S.A. de C.V.
28	5/9	XHMAF-TDT	Mazatlán	Canal 5 (Nu9ve)	118 kW	Radio Televisión
31	7	XHDL-TDT	Mazatlán	Azteca 7 (a+)	38.52 kW	Televisión Azteca
23	10	XHMZ-TDT	Mazatlán	TVP	100 kW	Televisión del Pacífico
29	14	XHSPRMS-TDT	Mazatlán	SPR multiplex (11.1 Canal Once, 14.1 Canal Catorce, 14.2 Ingenio Tv, 20.1 TV UNAM, 22.1 Canal 22, 45.1 Canal del Congreso)	28.65 kW	Sistema Público de Radiodifusión del Estado Mexicano
