= USS Gretchen =

USS Gretchen has been the name of more than one United States Navy ship, and may refer to:

- USS Gretchen (SP-423), a patrol boat in service from July to November 1917
- USS Gretchen (SP-1181), a patrol boat in commission from 1917 to 1919
