= TVP (Mexican TV network) =

Mexican regional TV network

TVP (formerly known as Televisoras Grupo Pacífico) is a regional television broadcaster in western Mexico, serving audiences in the state of Sinaloa and southern Sonora. It operates four primary regional stations under three concessions in Culiacán, Mazatlán, and Ciudad Obregón/Los Mochis, broadcasting as virtual channel 10.

== History ==
The first TVP station, XHQ-TV in Culiacán, signed on September 17, 1964. XHQ, the first television station in the state of Sinaloa, broadcast on analog channel 3 and was owned by TV de Culiacán, S.A. de C.V., co-owned by Rodolfo Rodríguez Arnold and Francisco Madero Herrera.

Even while XHQ was signing on, the ground was being laid for the second TVP station. On August 29, 1965, Ciudad Obregón's XHI-TV channel 2 went on the air, transmitting from a 200 m (660 ft) tower at its in-town studio site. However, the 60 t (66 short tons) tower was toppled by Tropical Storm Kirsten on September 27, 1966; XHI ultimately rebuilt full-power facilities atop Cerro Yucuribampo.

On December 18, 1967, test transmissions began at the Mazatlán station, XHMZ-TV channel 7, owned by Televisión del Pacífico, S.A. The Mazatlán station was started in association with Óscar Pérez Escobosa, who already owned XERJ and later bought XETK radio. XHMZ began formal broadcasts on October 12, 1968, in time for the opening ceremony of the 1968 Summer Olympics.

After the initial three stations were built, further expansion of Televisoras Grupo Pacífico, as the group was known, did not occur until 1988, when XHI built a repeater on Cerro de la Memoria in Los Mochis, more than 200 kilometers (120 mi) from Ciudad Obregón. The Los Mochis repeater, while still licensed as such, soon turned into a full-fledged local station with its own programming. XHI later added a repeater in the late 2000s on Cerro del Vigía, broadcasting on channel 34, to serve Empalme and Guaymas; for a short time, the station produced local news for the Guaymas area.

Prior to 2016, each station was known by its local channel number (2, 3 and 7). However, that year, virtual channels were realigned across Mexico, and each of those channel numbers was assigned to a national network. In conjunction with a virtual channel change to 10 in all areas, Televisoras Grupo Pacífico rebranded as "TVP".

Historically, TVP is a Televisa partner, and the TVP stations aired programming from Gala TV/Nu9ve and FOROtv. However, this relationship, like many of its kind, ended in 2018, though TVP's concessionaires remain designated as part of the preponderant economic agent in broadcasting.
