= List of storms named Gretchen =

The name Gretchen has been used for three tropical cyclones in the East Pacific Ocean:

- Tropical Storm Gretchen (1966)
- Tropical Storm Gretchen (1970)
- Hurricane Gretchen (1974)
