= XHI-TDT =

TV station in Ciudad Obregón, Sonora, Mexico

- Cd. Obregón, Sonora/ Los Mochis, Sinaloa; Mexico
- Channels: Digital: 32 (UHF); Virtual: 10
- Branding: TVP

Programming
- Affiliations: Independent

Ownership
- Owner: Televisoras Del Pacífico; (Televisora del Yaqui, S.A. de C.V.)
- Sister stations: XHQ-TDT; XHMZ-TDT

History
- First air date: August 30, 1965
- Former channel numbers: 2 (analog and digital virtual, 1965–2016)

Technical information
- Licensing authority: CRT
- ERP: 125 kW (digital)
- HAAT: 423.3 m (1,389 ft)
- Transmitter coordinates: 27°28′00″N 109°46′33″W

Links
- Website: Televisoras Grupo Pacífico

XHI-TDT is a television station in Ciudad Obregón, Sonora. Broadcasting on virtual channel 10, XHI is part of the regional network of Televisoras del Pacífico (Formerly Televisoras Grupo Pacífico).

== History ==
XHI came to air on analog channel 2 on August 30, 1965; the final concession had been awarded just four days prior, on August 26. The original transmitter was located next to the studios on a 200 metres (660 ft) tower. The 60 tonnes (66 short tons) antenna was destroyed in the aftermath of Tropical Storm Kirsten on September 28, 1966; fortunately, there were no technical damages, which allowed the resumption of broadcasting days later with a temporary antenna.

In 1968, XHI relocated its transmitter to Cerro Yucuribampo; four years later, the station relocated to its present studios on Miguel Alemán Avenue in Ciudad Obregón. A power hike raised the station's effective radiated power from 75 to 86 kW in the 1980s and again to the maximum 100 kW in the 1990s.

In 1988, XHI built a repeater on Cerro de la Memoria in Los Mochis, more than 200 kilometres (120 mi) away in the neighboring state of Sinaloa. The Los Mochis repeater, while still licensed as such, soon turned into a full-fledged local station with its own programming.

The late 2000s saw XHI expand north to the town of Guaymas. An analog repeater was built on Cerro del Vigía, broadcasting on channel 34, and limited local production began, primarily of newscasts.

== Programming ==
XHI's stations in Obregón and Mochis produce substantial local programming; while the latter is licensed as a repeater, it is treated by Televisoras Grupo Pacífico as a separate station, with its own local news. The local programming includes news, lifestyle shows and sports programming.

In October 2016, XHI, including all its repeaters, switched to virtual channel 10 as a result of new guidelines harmonizing television virtual channels nationwide. Channel 2 was used for the Las Estrellas network nationwide, requiring XHI to move; similarly, other national networks prompted other TVP stations to move to virtual channel 10.

Televisa output was present until 2018 on the TVP network in the form of Gala TV and FOROtv national programs and selected Major League Baseball games, as well as telenovelas.

== Digital television ==
XHI was the first commercial station in Sonora to broadcast in digital and the first in Obregón after receiving Cofetel approval to build digital facilities in 2010; Los Mochis also built digital facilities. Televisoras Grupo Pacífico was an early builder of digital facilities for its stations; Guaymas was converted in 2015, only because it was a flash-cut on the same channel as its analog predecessor.

=== Repeaters ===
RF	Location	ERP
32	Los Mochis	
34	Empalme	5 kW

=== Subchannels ===
In 2015, XHI in Obregón began multiplexing its signal:

VC	RF	Video	Ratio	PSIP	Programming
2.1	32.1	1080i	16:9		Main XHI (Cd. Obregón) programming
2.2	32.2	480i	4:3		XHI Obregón -1 hour
2.3	32.3	480i	4:3		XHI Los Mochis

The Los Mochis station airs its main programs on 2.1 and a -1 hour feed on 2.2.
