= USS Gretchen (SP-423) =

Vintage US Navy motor boat

History

United States
- Name: USS Gretchen
- Namesake: Previous name retained
- Acquired: 30 July 1917
- Fate: Returned to owner 1 November 1917
- Notes: Operated as private motorboat Gretchen before and after U.S. Navy service

General characteristics
- Type: Patrol vessel
- Tonnage: 84 gross register tons
- Length: 86 ft (26 m)
- Beam: 13 ft 6 in (4.11 m)
- Draft: 4 ft (1.2 m)
- Speed: 10 knots

The first USS Gretchen (SP-423) was a patrol vessel acquired by the United States Navy in 1917.

Gretchen was built as a private motorboat. On 30 July 1917, the U.S. Navy acquired her from her owner, Sylvanus Stokes, for use as a section patrol boat during World War I. She was placed in service as USS Gretchen (SP-423).

Assigned to the 5th Naval District, Gretchen was found unsuited for use in patrol duties. The Navy returned her to her owner on 1 November 1917.

Gretchen should not be confused with USS Gretchen (SP-1181), another patrol vessel in U.S. Navy service at the same time.
