= USS Gretchen (SP-1181) =

Patrol vessel of the United States Navy

History

United States
- Name: USS Gretchen
- Namesake: Previous name retained
- Completed: 1902
- Acquired: 20 August 1917
- Commissioned: 24 August 1917
- Decommissioned: 1 January 1919
- Fate: Returned to owners 1 January 1919
- Notes: Operated as civilian motorboat Gretchen 1902-1917 and from 1919

General characteristics
- Type: Patrol vessel
- Tonnage: 11 gross register tons
- Length: 54 ft (16 m)
- Beam: 12 ft (3.7 m)
- Draft: 3 ft 6 in (1.07 m)
- Speed: 9 knots
- Armament: 2 × 6-pounder guns

The second USS Gretchen (SP-1181) was a United States Navy patrol vessel in commission from 1917 to 1919.

Gretchen was built as a civilian motorboat of the same name in 1902 by White of Belhaven, North Carolina. On 20 August 1917, the U.S. Navy acquired her from her owners, the North Carolina Fisheries Commission, for use as a section patrol boat during World War I. She was commissioned as USS Gretchen (SP-1181) at Oriental, North Carolina, on 24 August 1917.

After fitting out at Norfolk, Virginia, Gretchen was assigned to the 5th Naval District and based at the patrol station at Wanchese, North Carolina. She cruised Albemarle Sound and Pamlico Sound on section patrol duty for the remainder of World War I. She also performed inspection and patrol duties for the North Carolina Fisheries Commission during the period.

Gretchen was decommissioned and simultaneously returned to the fisheries commission on 1 January 1919.

Gretchen should not be confused with USS Gretchen (SP-423), another patrol vessel in U.S. Navy service at the same time.
