= 1966 Pacific hurricane season =

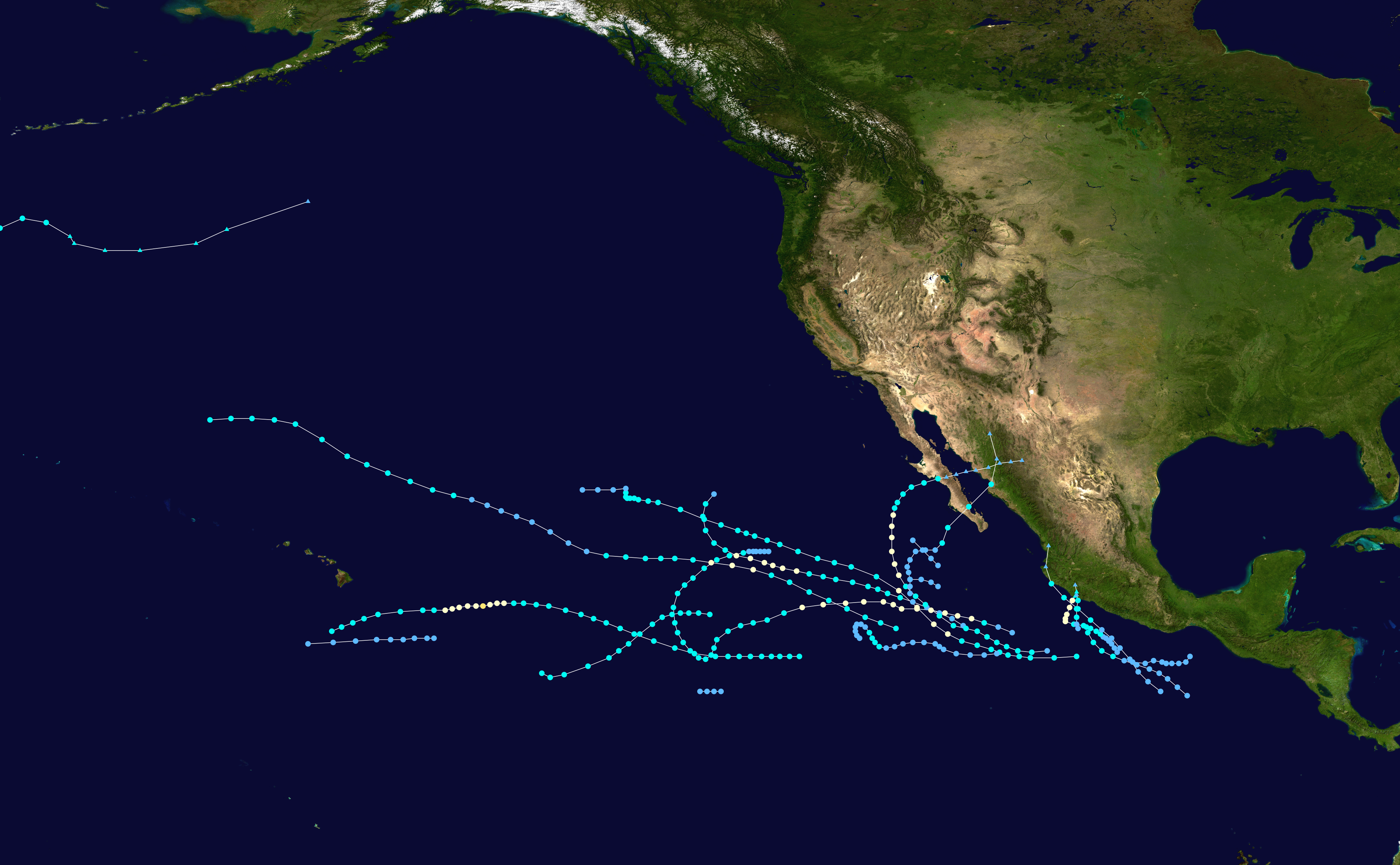
- Season summary map

Seasonal boundaries
- First system formed: June 12, 1966
- Last system dissipated: October 19, 1966

Strongest storm
- Name: Connie and Dolores
  - Maximum winds: 85 mph (140 km/h) (1-minute sustained)
  - Lowest pressure: 981 mbar (hPa; 28.97 inHg)

Seasonal statistics
- Total depressions: 18
- Total storms: 13
- Hurricanes: 8
- Major hurricanes (Cat. 3+): 0
- Total fatalities: 9+
- Total damage: $5.6 million (1966 USD)

Related articles
- 1966 Atlantic hurricane season; 1966 Pacific typhoon season; 1966 North Indian Ocean cyclone season

The 1966 Pacific hurricane season started on May 15, 1966, and ended November 30, 1966. The season was of little note. Hurricane Blanca traveled 4,300 miles, setting a new record. During September and October of the year, Hurricane Helga and Tropical Storms Kirsten, Lorraine, and Maggie hitting Mexico. Kirsten caused 8 deaths and US$5.6 million (equivalent to $55.57 million in 2025) in damages in Mexico.

== Systems ==
=== Hurricane Adele ===
- Category 1 hurricane (SSHWS)
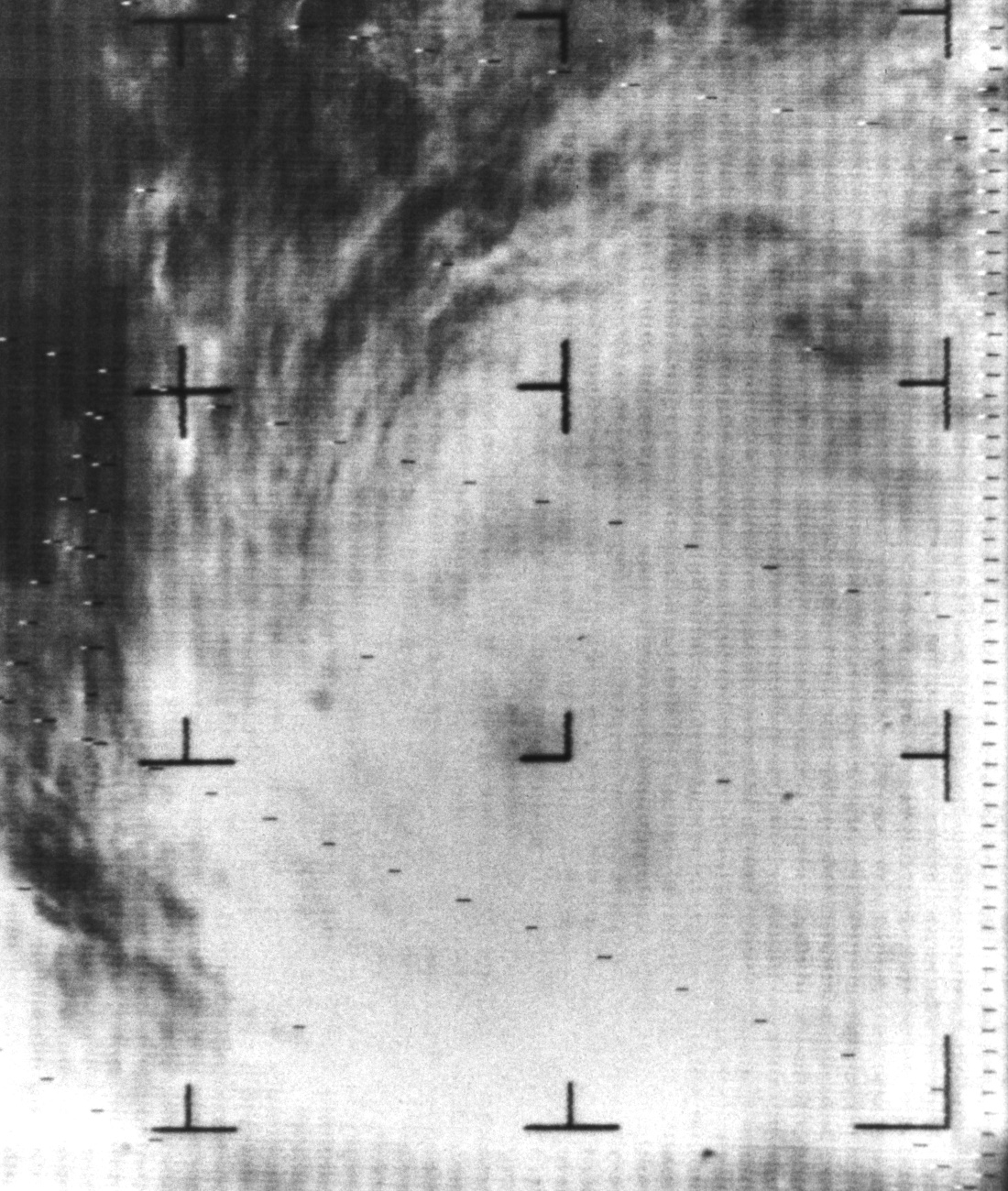
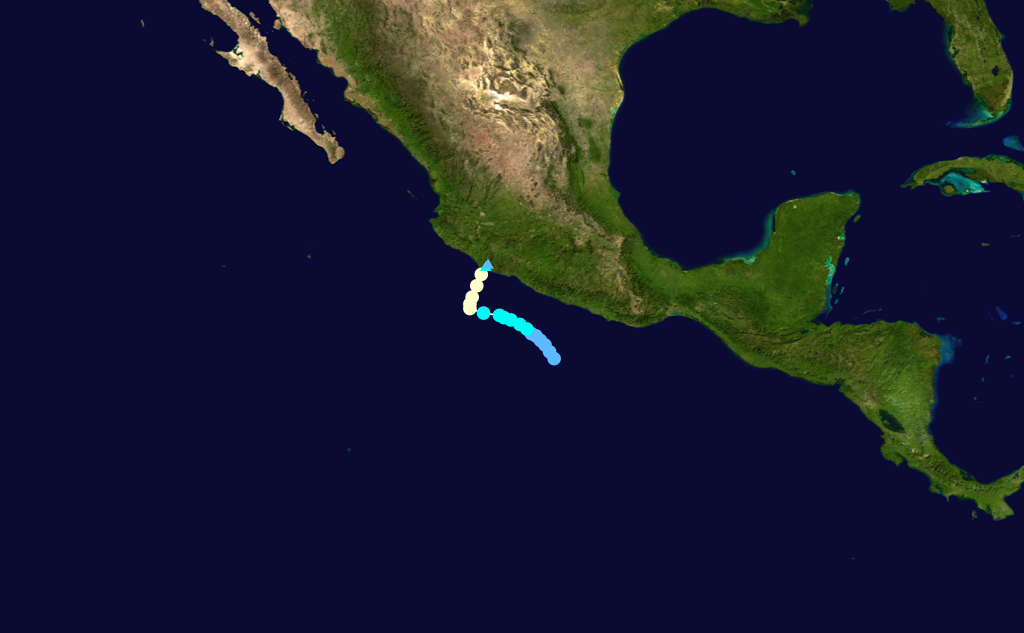
- Duration: June 20 – June 24
- Peak intensity: 85 mph (140 km/h) (1-min); 982 mbar (hPa; 29 inHg)

On the morning of June 20, the first tropical depression of the season formed south of Mexico. It initially went west-northwestward. On the afternoon of June 21, the depression strengthened into a tropical storm and was named Adele. It continued north until the evening of June 22, when it strengthened into a Category 1 hurricane and sharply recurved west. It made landfall west of Manzanillo, Mexico on the evening of June 24 and dissipated that day. Extensive damage was caused by Adele in Mexico but no deaths were reported. Adele was the shortest lived hurricane of the season.

=== Tropical Depression Two ===
- Tropical depression (SSHWS)
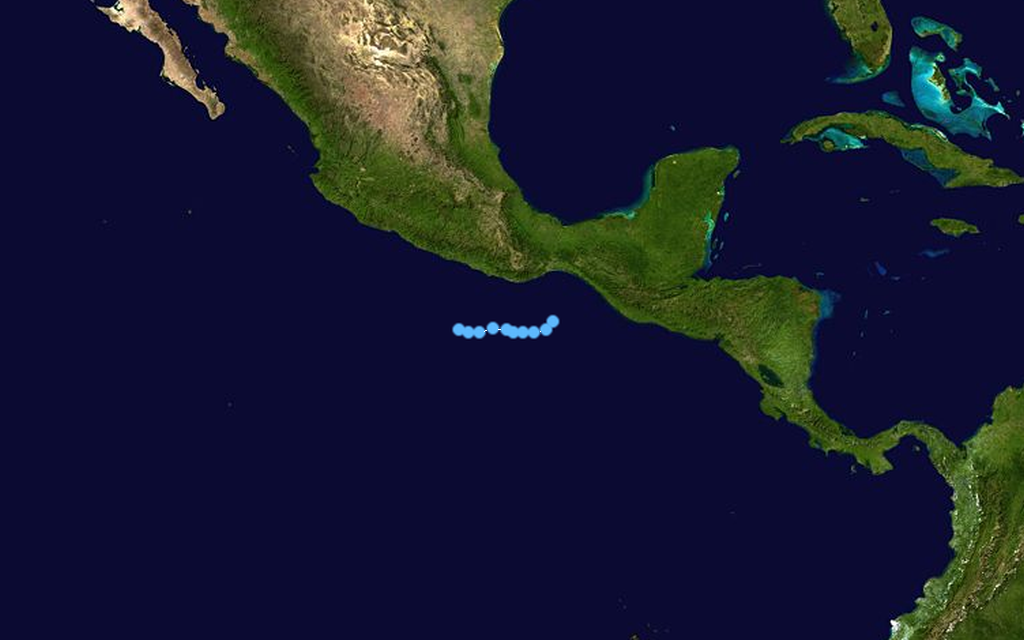
- Duration: June 28 – June 30
- Peak intensity: 30 mph (45 km/h) (1-min); {{{Pressure}}} hPa (mbar)

On June 28, a tropical depression formed west of Central America. It remained weak and dissipated two days later, never threatening land. Tropical Depression Two caused no reports of damages or deaths.

=== Tropical Depression Three ===
- Tropical depression (SSHWS)
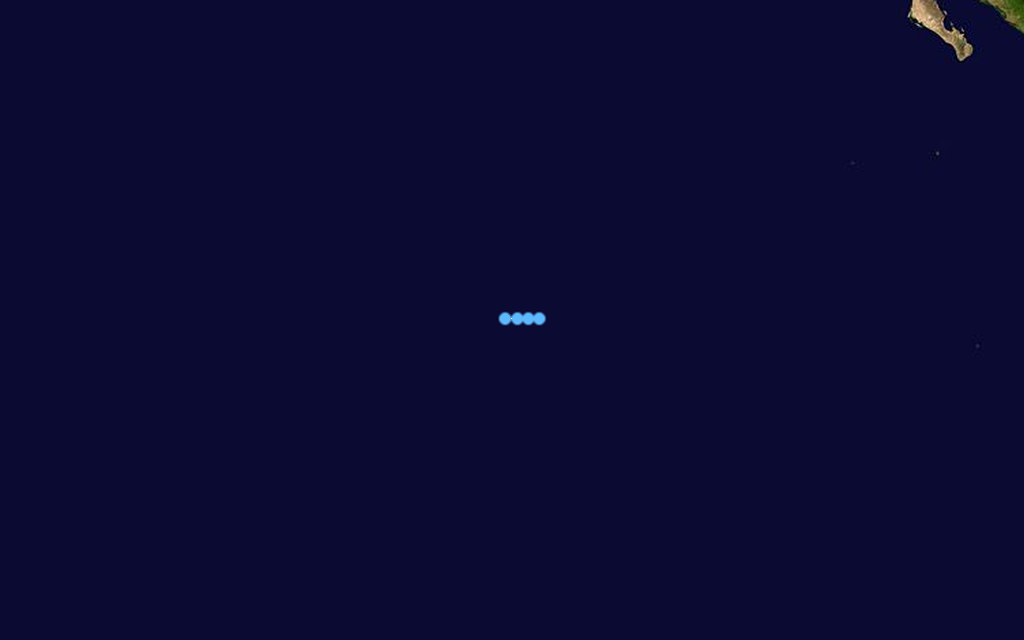
- Duration: July 11 – July 11
- Peak intensity: 30 mph (45 km/h) (1-min); {{{Pressure}}} hPa (mbar)

=== Hurricane Blanca ===
- Category 1 hurricane (SSHWS)
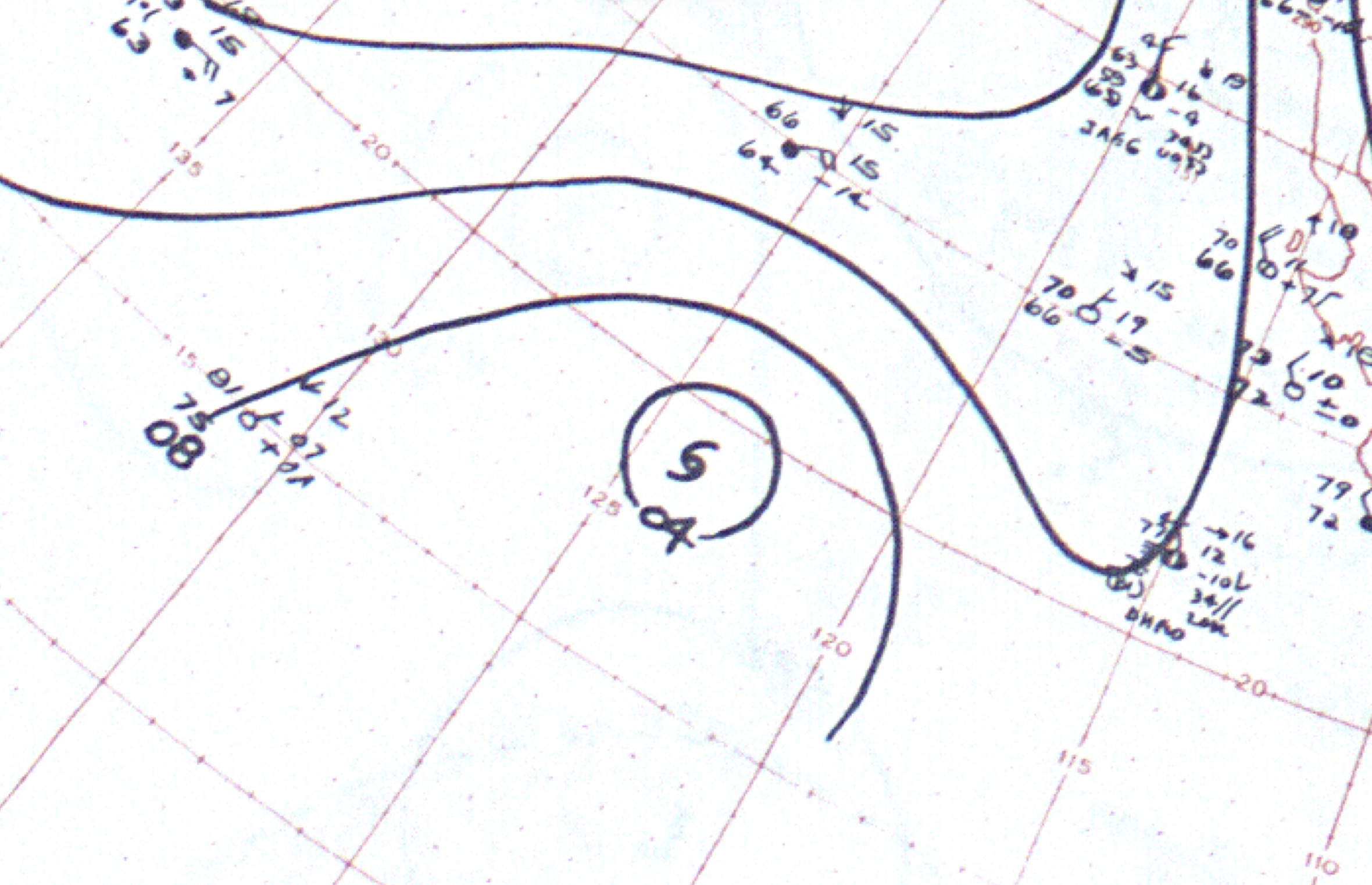
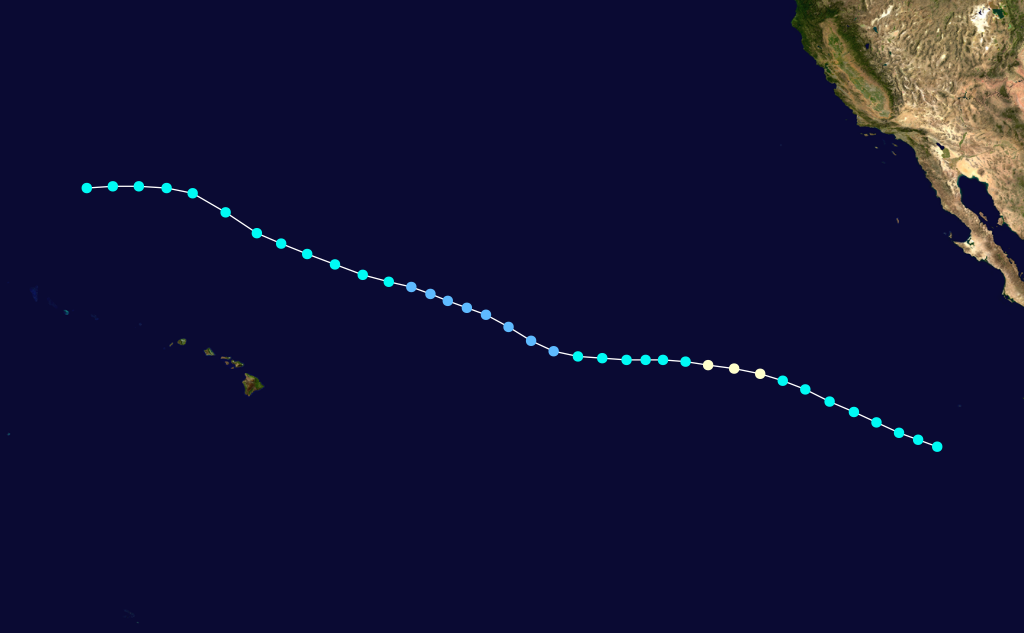
- Duration: August 2 – August 12
- Peak intensity: 85 mph (140 km/h) (1-min); 990 mbar (hPa; 29.23 inHg)

On the evening of August 2, a tropical storm formed south of Mexico, skipping tropical depression strength. It initially went west-northwest until the evening of August 4 when it reached Category 1 hurricane status. Blanca eventually leveled off as it headed westward. On the morning of August 7, Blanca weakened into a tropical depression after weakening into a tropical storm two days later. During the afternoon of that day, Blanca crossed into the Central Pacific as a 30-mile per hour tropical depression. Blanca regained tropical storm status on August 9 as it went northwestward. Blanca continued stair-stepping as it dissipated on August 12 while northwest of Honolulu, Hawaii. As Blanca never affected land, there were no reports of damages or deaths. Blanca set a record for the farthest traveling storm that formed in the Eastern Pacific by traveling 4,300 miles during its life. (1957's Hurricane/Typhoon Della traveled 5,000 miles, but formed in the Central Pacific.)

=== Hurricane Connie ===
- Category 1 hurricane (SSHWS)
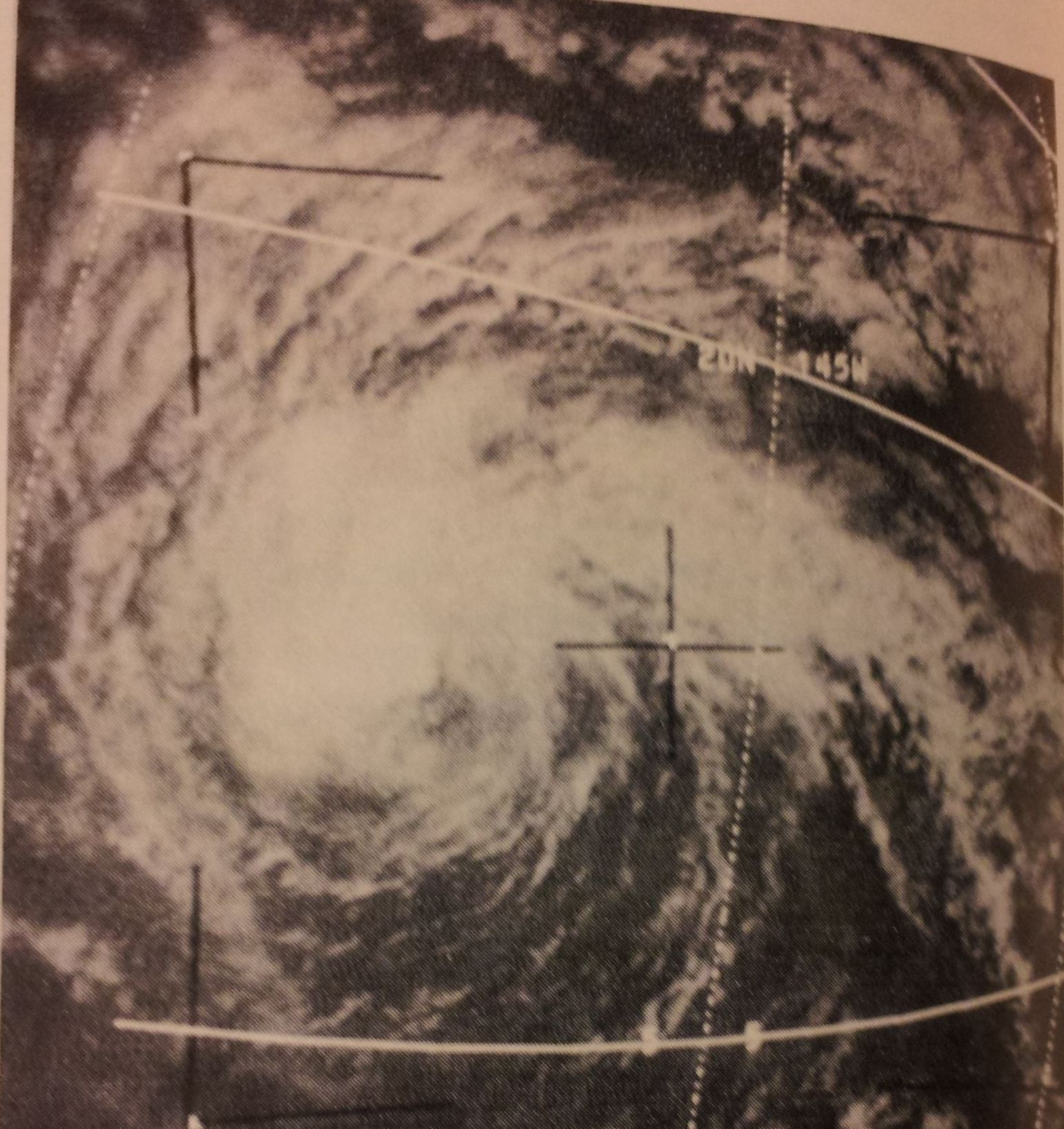
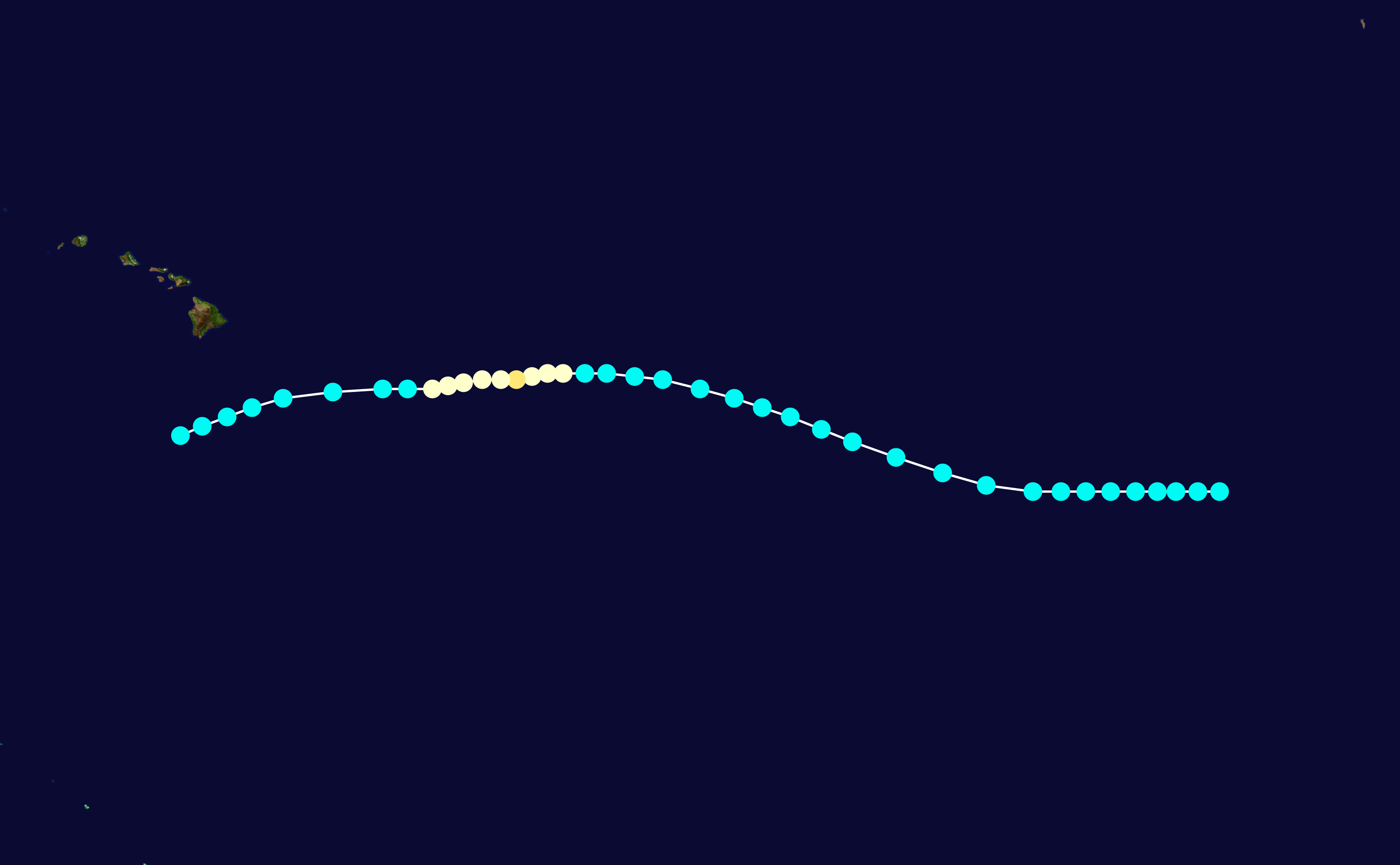
- Duration: August 7 – August 17
- Peak intensity: 85 mph (140 km/h) (1-min); 981 mbar (hPa; 28.97 inHg)

On August 7, a tropical storm was identified southwest of the Baja California Peninsula and named Connie. It continued westward until three days later when Connie began to move northwest while remaining a tropical storm. During the morning of August 12, the storm crossed into the Central Pacific. The next morning, Connie was deemed to have become a hurricane with winds of 85 miles per hour. Connie was stable in intensity until the 15th when it weakened into a tropical storm while southeast of the Big Island of Hawaii. Connie dissipated while almost directly south of Kihei on Maui. Connie caused no reported damage or deaths in Hawaii.

=== Tropical Depression Six ===
- Tropical depression (SSHWS)
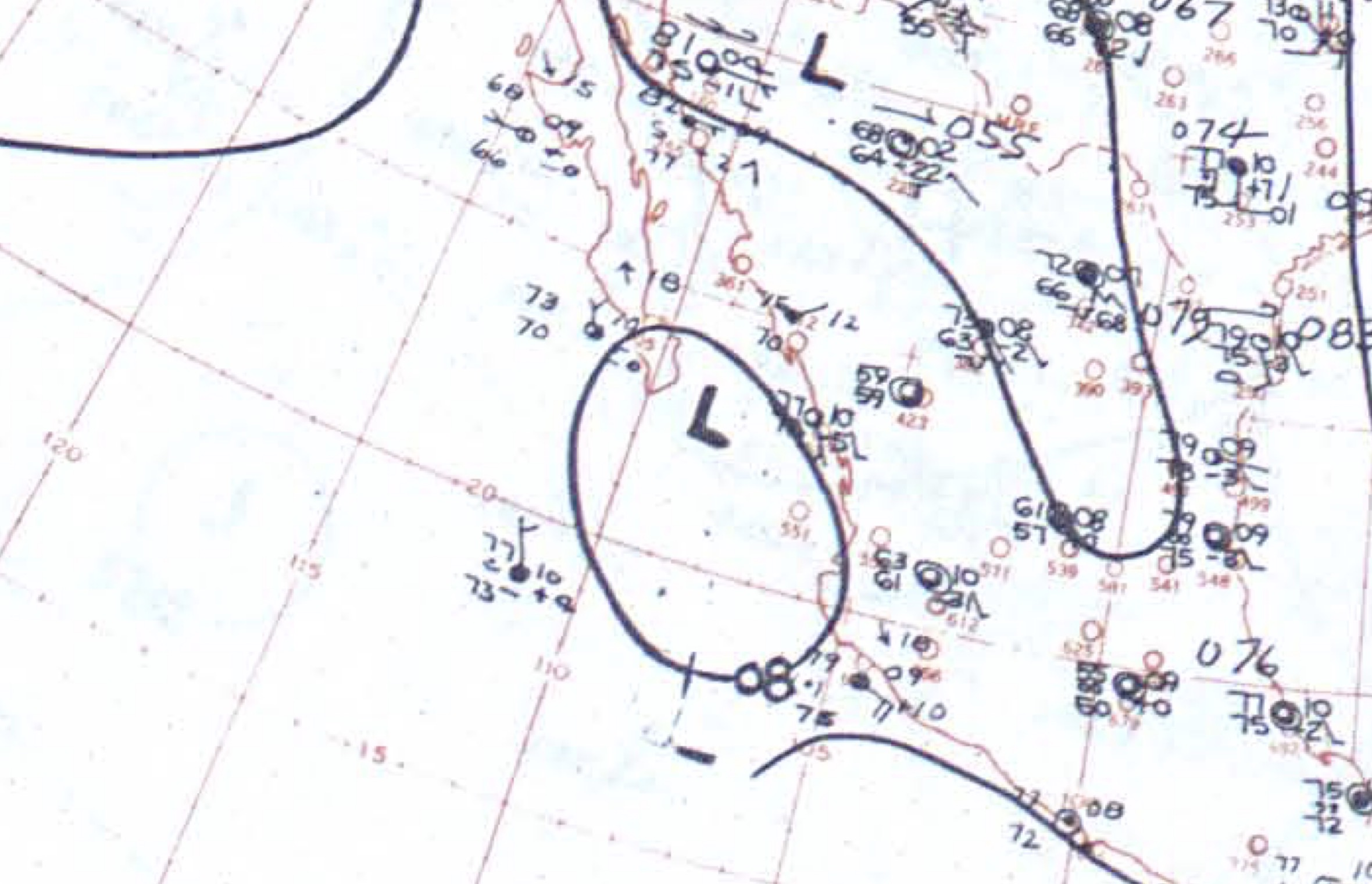
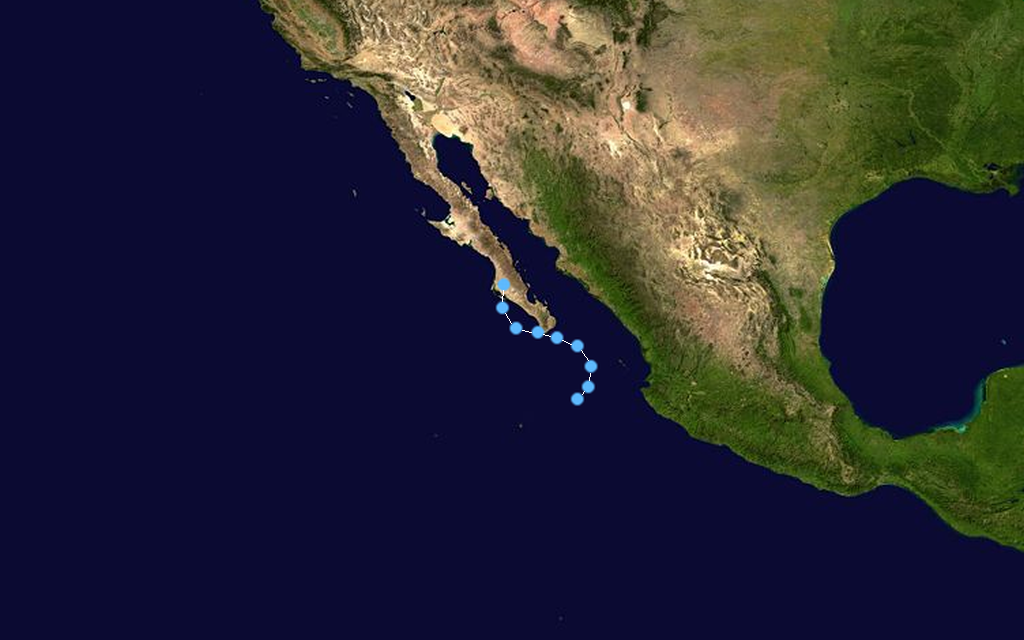
- Duration: August 11 – August 13
- Peak intensity: 30 mph (45 km/h) (1-min); {{{Pressure}}} hPa (mbar)

=== Tropical Depression Seven ===
- Tropical depression (SSHWS)
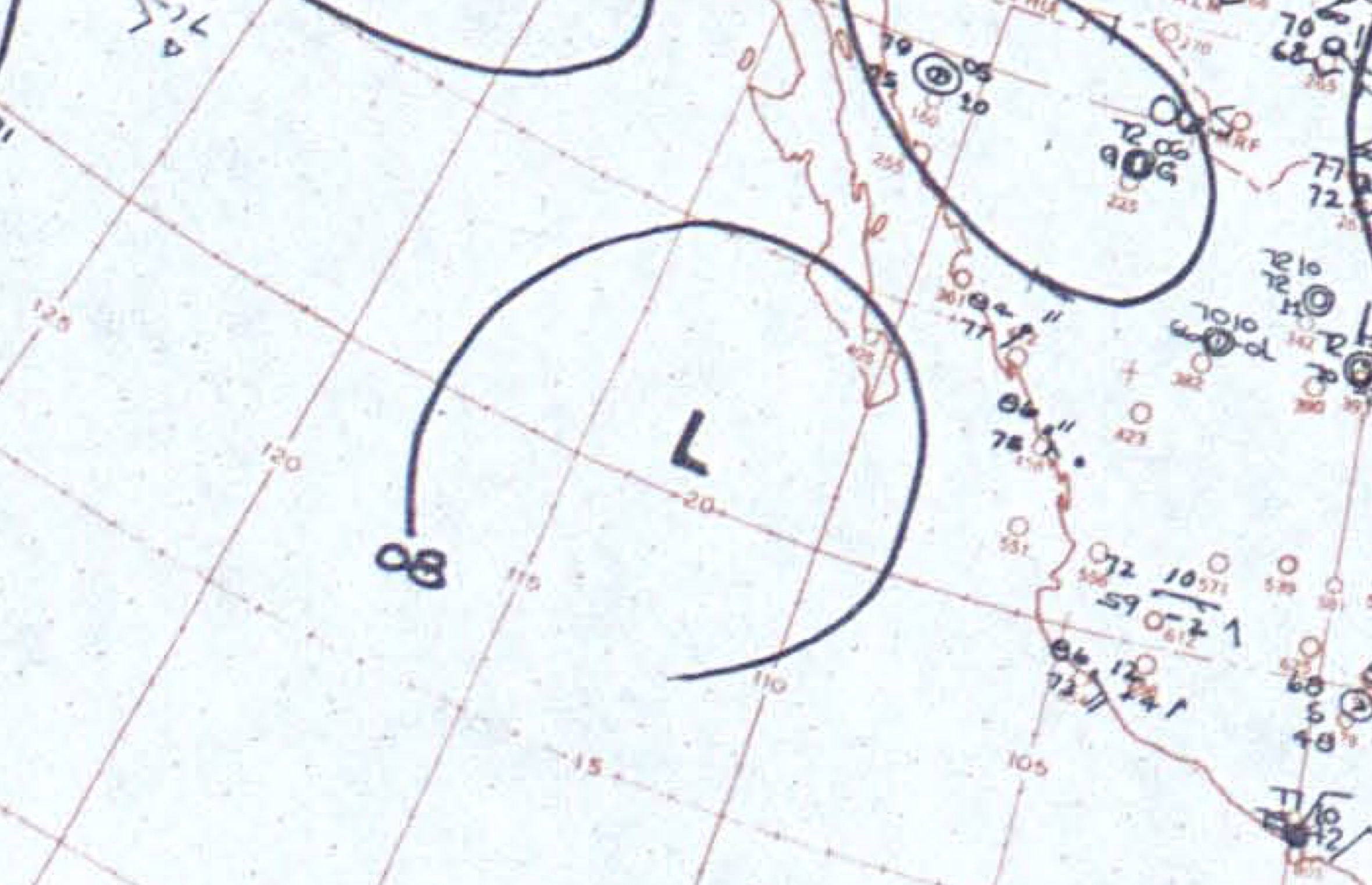
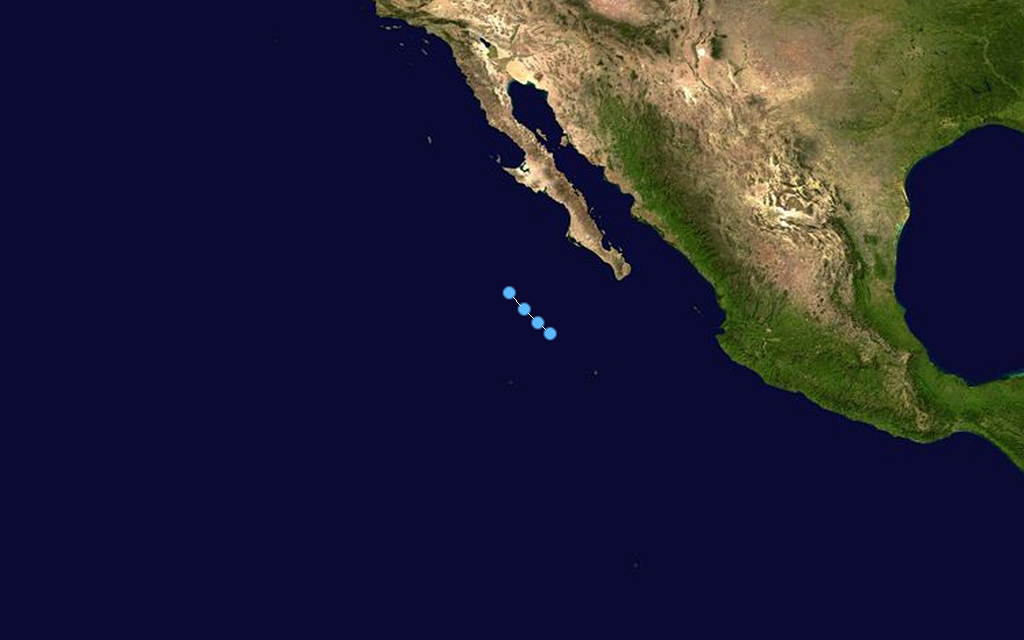
- Duration: August 15 – August 16
- Peak intensity: 30 mph (45 km/h) (1-min); hPa (mbar)

=== Hurricane Dolores ===
- Category 1 hurricane (SSHWS)
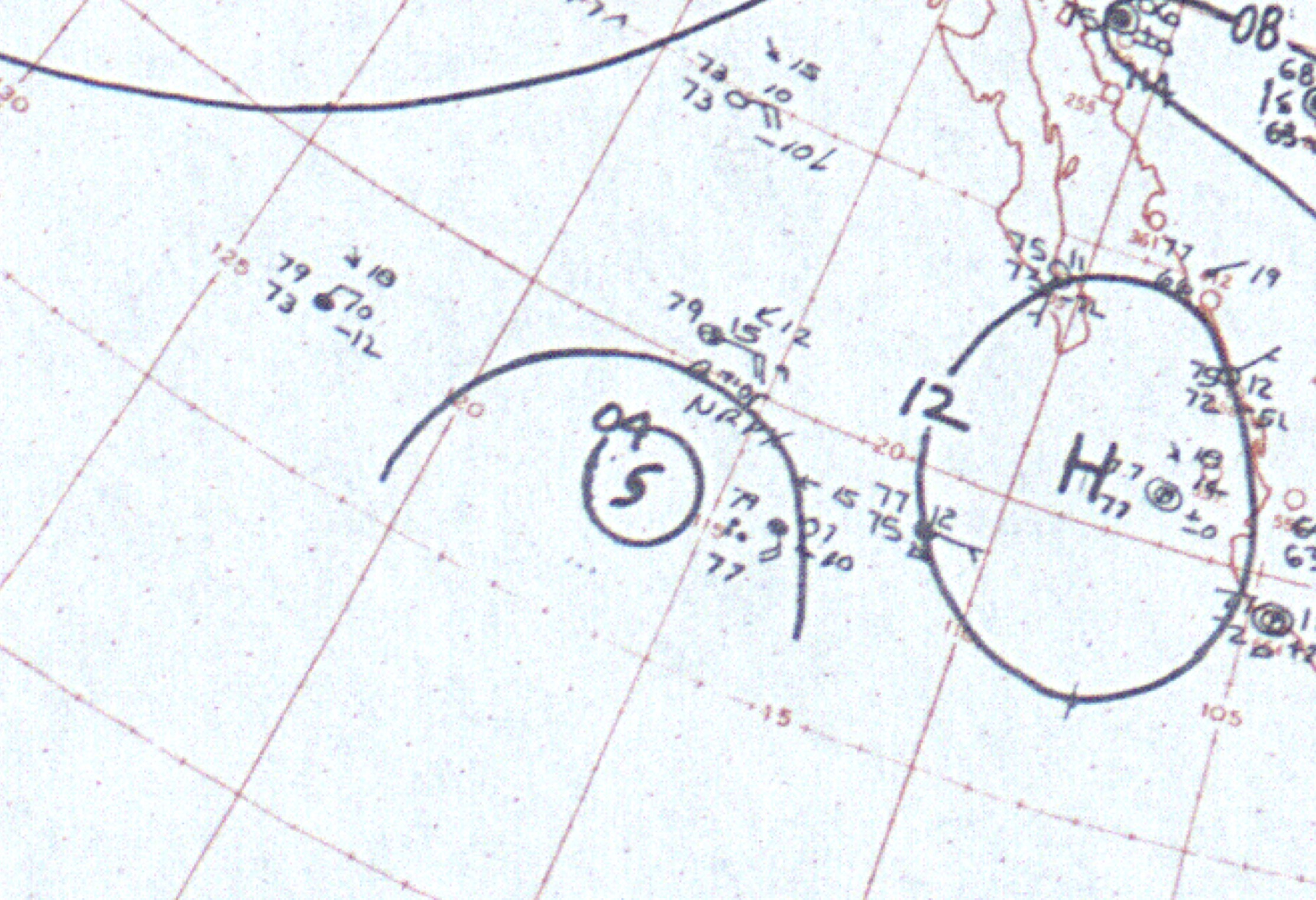
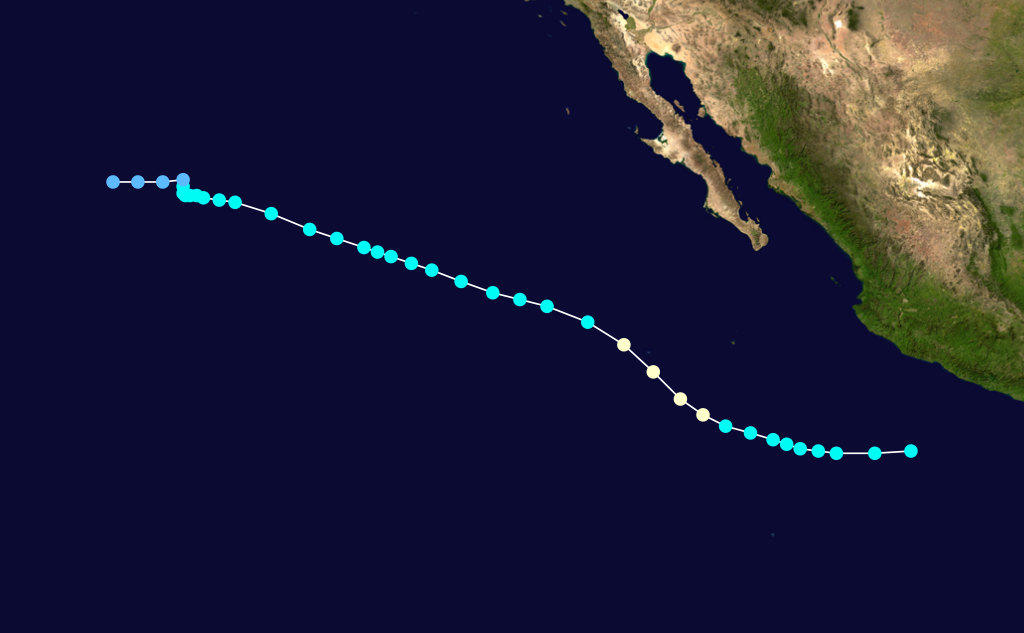
- Duration: August 16 – August 25
- Peak intensity: 85 mph (140 km/h) (1-min); 981 mbar (hPa; 28.97 inHg)

On August 16, a tropical storm was identified south of Manzanillo, Mexico and was named Dolores, the eight tropical depression of the season. During the afternoon of August 18, Dolores was noted to have more organization and became a hurricane. Dolores time as a hurricane was brief, Dolores weakened 24 hours after being upgraded. Dolores continued on its northwestward trek until August 23 when it became quasi-stationary and began to weaken. Dolores dissipated on August 25 while far away from land.

=== Tropical Depression Nine ===
- Tropical depression (SSHWS)
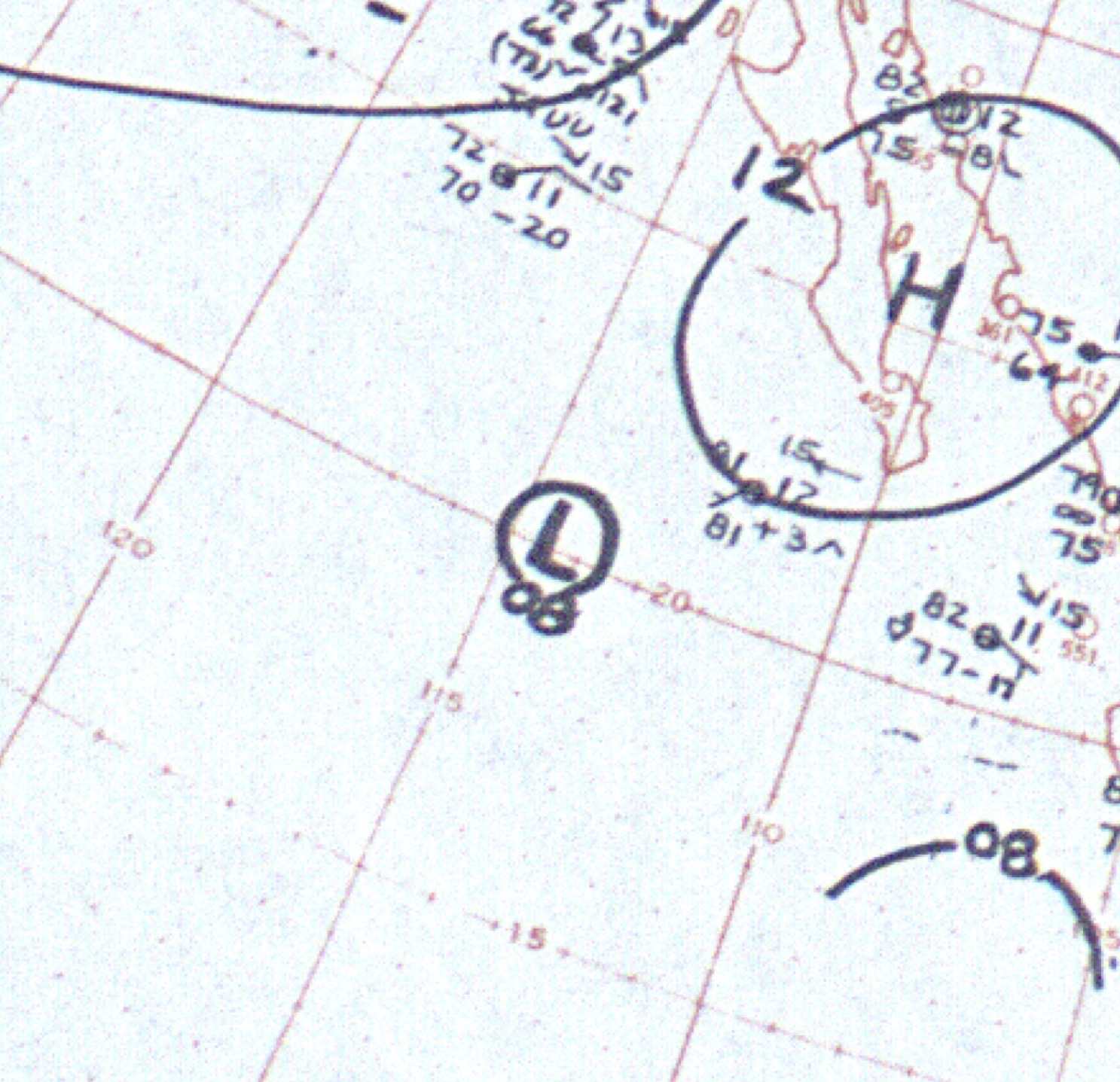
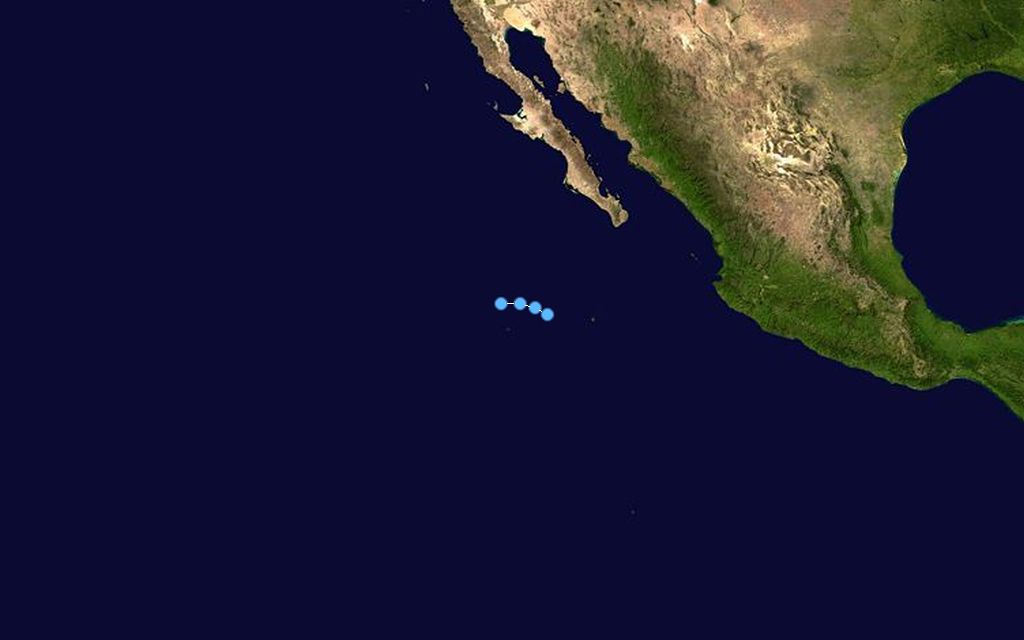
- Duration: August 17 – August 17
- Peak intensity: 30 mph (45 km/h) (1-min); {{{Pressure}}} hPa (mbar)

=== Hurricane Eileen ===
- Category 1 hurricane (SSHWS)
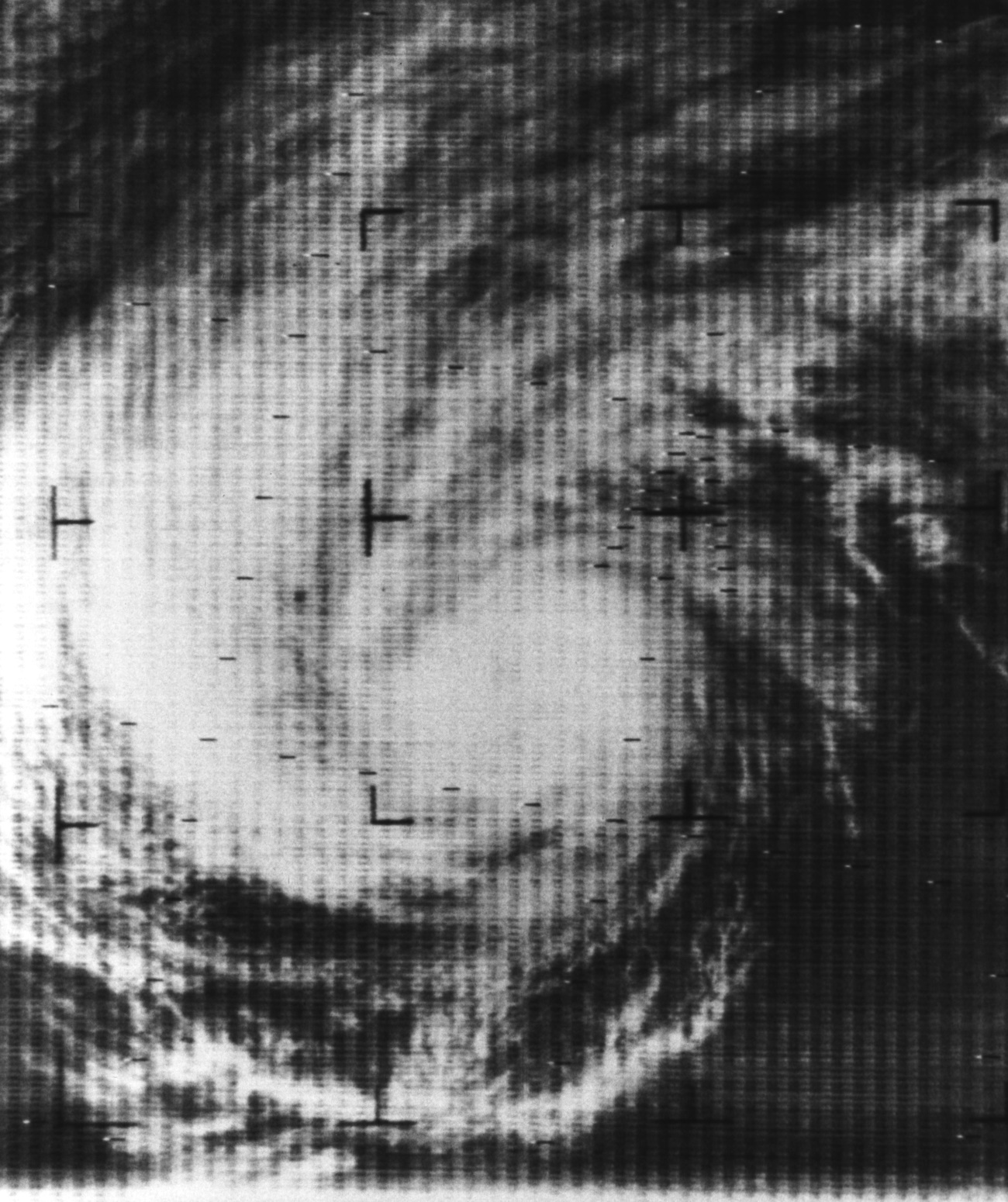
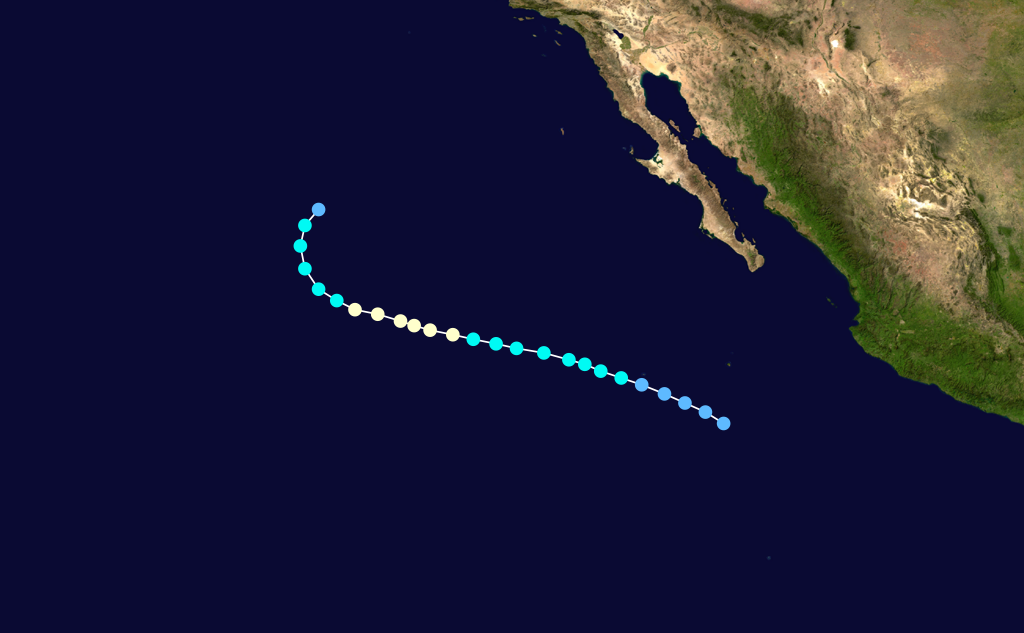
- Duration: August 22 – August 29
- Peak intensity: 85 mph (140 km/h) (1-min); 990 mbar (hPa; 29.23 inHg)

On August 22, an area of low pressure gained enough organization and became Tropical Depression Ten. Two days later, the depression strengthened into a tropical storm and was named Eileen. Eileen headed northwest-ward as the slowly became stronger. On the morning of August 26, Eileen rapidly strengthened and became the seasons 5th hurricane. Eileen stayed this was for 36 hours and its minimum pressure of 990 mbar was recorded. Just before it recurved, it weakened into a tropical storm as it moved over cooler waters. As it continued to recurve sharply, and on the night of August 28 (PDT time) it weakened into a remnant low. During the 26th, a ship sailed through the hurricane but there was no reported damage aboard the ship. Eileen also caused no deaths.

=== Hurricane Francesca ===
- Category 1 hurricane (SSHWS)
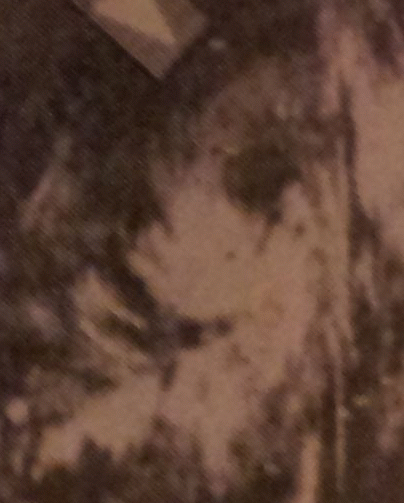
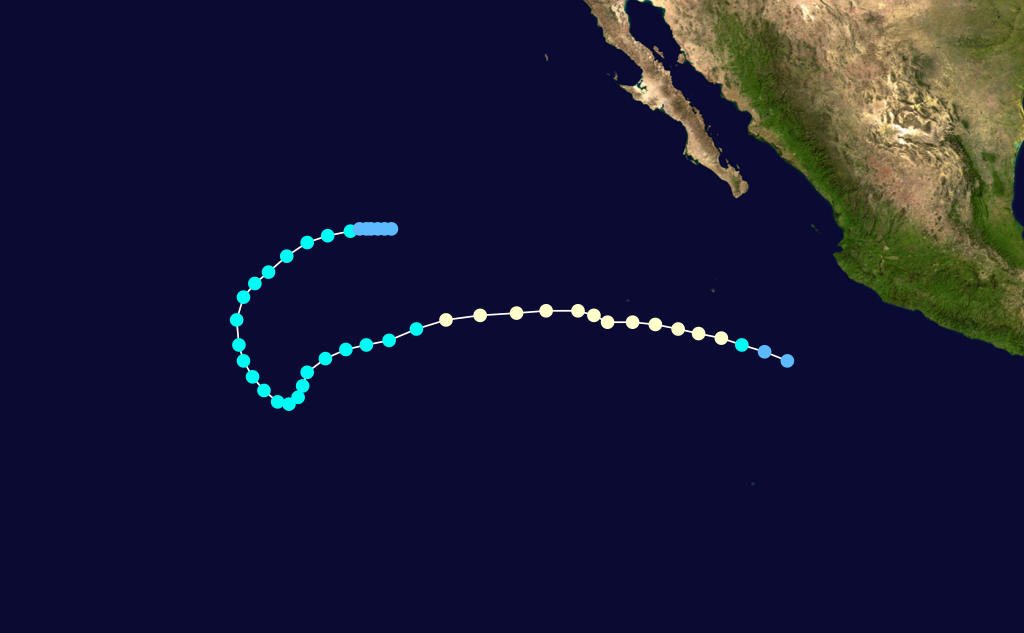
- Duration: September 5 – September 16
- Peak intensity: 85 mph (140 km/h) (1-min); 992 mbar (hPa; 29.29 inHg)

Tropical Depression Eleven formed due south of La Paz, Mexico on September 5. The next morning, the depression became the season's sixth tropical storm and was named Francesca. Francesca entered a period of rapid strengthening for six hours as the storm's winds increased by 35 mph (56 km/h) and became the season's sixth hurricane. After this period of strengthening, Francesca leveled out and remained a hurricane until the morning of September 9 when it weakened prior to a southward dive as the result of interacting with nearby Tropical Storm Gretchen. Francesca continued to trek southward until the evening of September 11, when the storm very sharply recurved. Subsequently, Francesca weakened into a tropical depression as it went due east for 36 hours. Francesca degenerated into a remnant low on the morning of September 16. Francesca was the longest lived hurricane of the season by lasting eleven days. Wave action from Francesca and Hurricane Helga caused beach erosion throughout California.

=== Tropical Storm Gretchen ===
- Tropical storm (SSHWS)
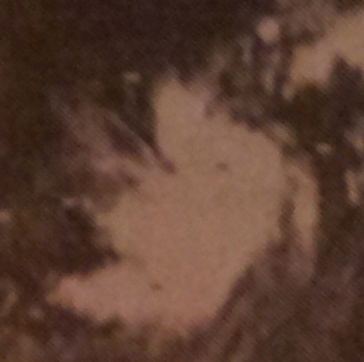
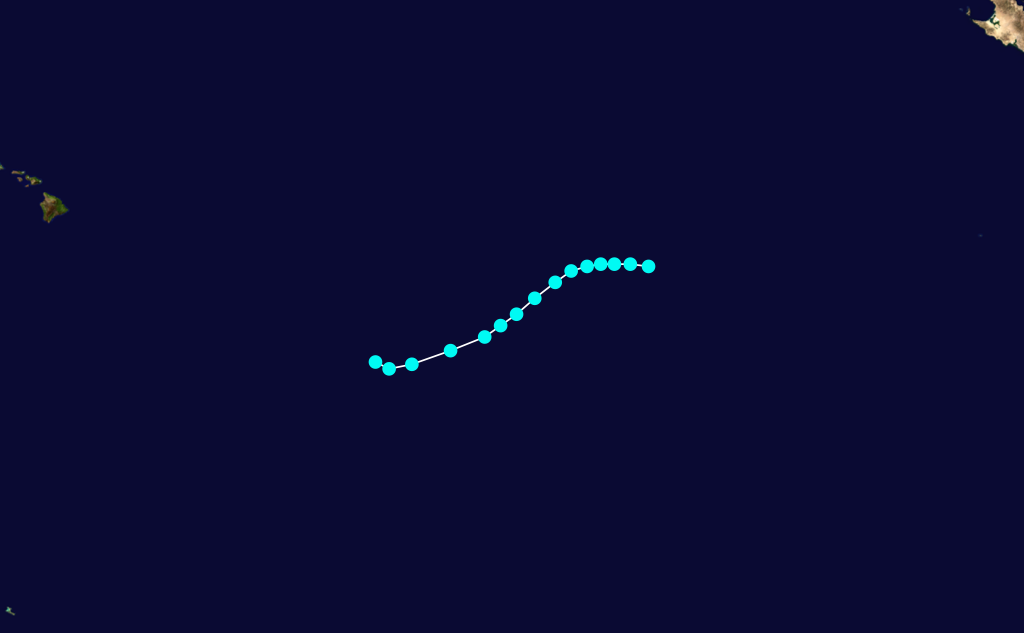
- Duration: September 7 – September 11
- Peak intensity: 50 mph (85 km/h) (1-min); 992 mbar (hPa; 29.29 inHg)

During the evening of September 7, a tropical disturbance that was near Hurricane Francesca became Tropical Storm Gretchen, bypassing the depression stage. Gretchen did not strengthen during its lifetime due to its proximity to Francesca and was nearly absorbed by its because Francesca disorganized Gretchen, the last advisory was issued on September 11. Because Gretchen never affected land, there was no damage or deaths reported from it.

=== Hurricane Helga ===
- Category 1 hurricane (SSHWS)
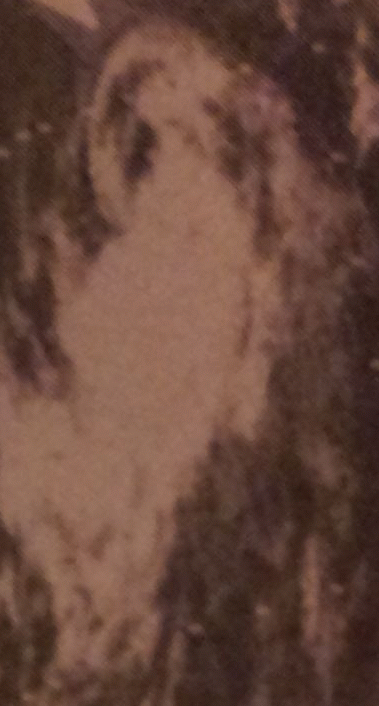
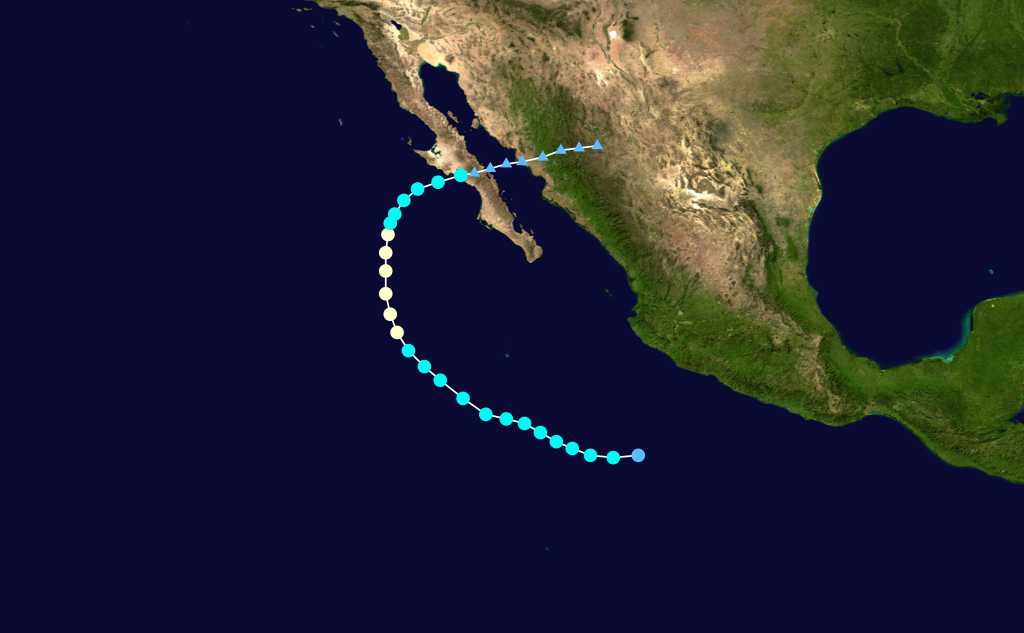
- Duration: September 9 – September 17
- Peak intensity: 85 mph (140 km/h) (1-min); 992 mbar (hPa; 29.29 inHg)

On the morning of September 9, a tropical wave spawned Tropical Depression Thirteen. The storm was quickly to intensify and was named six hours later. The tropical storm began to curve north and on September 12 Helga became the eighth, and last hurricane of the season. it remained at that intensity for 36 hours and then began to weaken. it had weakened into a tropical storm when it made landfall on the Baja California Peninsula and weakened into a tropical depression. The depression dissipated on the September 17 while in the Mexican state of Chihuahua.

Helga caused the death of one person in California and also caused beach erosion throughout California and the Baja California Peninsula. The combined wave action from Helga and Francesca caused extensive damage throughout the region.

=== Tropical Storm Ione ===
- Tropical storm (SSHWS)
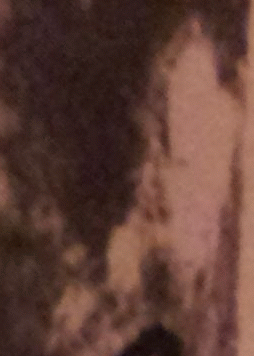
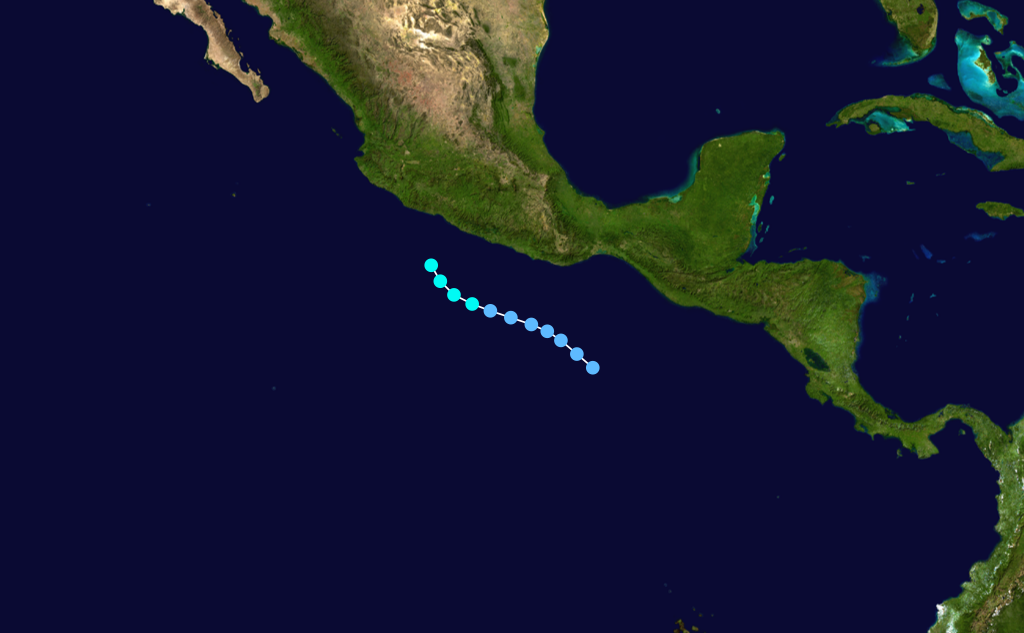
- Duration: September 10 – September 13
- Peak intensity: 50 mph (85 km/h) (1-min); 999 mbar (hPa; 29.5 inHg)

On September 10, Tropical Depression Fourteen formed west of Tropical Storm Helga. The depression was slow to organize and became Tropical Storm Ione during the afternoon of the September 12. Ione's time as a tropical storm was brief and the last advisory was issued the next morning due to land interaction that weakened the system. Even though Ione dissipated near Mexico, the remnant low brought rain to Mexico. No deaths or damages were reported due to Ione when it was warned upon. While it was a low, there is no information.

=== Tropical Depression Twenty-Two ===
- Tropical depression (SSHWS)
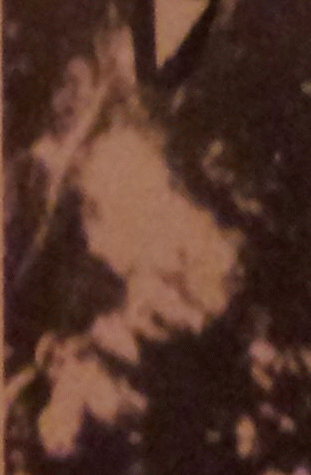
- Duration: September 10 – September 12
- Peak intensity: 30 mph (45 km/h) (1-min); hPa (mbar)

On September 10 a tropical depression was located by the Joint Hurricane Warning Center (JHWC) and was designated Tropical Depression Twenty-two and was heading westward. During the morning of the 12th, the depression passed 240 miles south of the island of Hawaii. It dissipated that night. The depression caused heavy rainfall throughout the Hawaiian Islands during the 12th. The reason that this depression was named 22 is unknown, but it is probably because it was numbered with the Western Pacific storm numbers.

=== Tropical Storm Joyce ===
- Tropical storm (SSHWS)
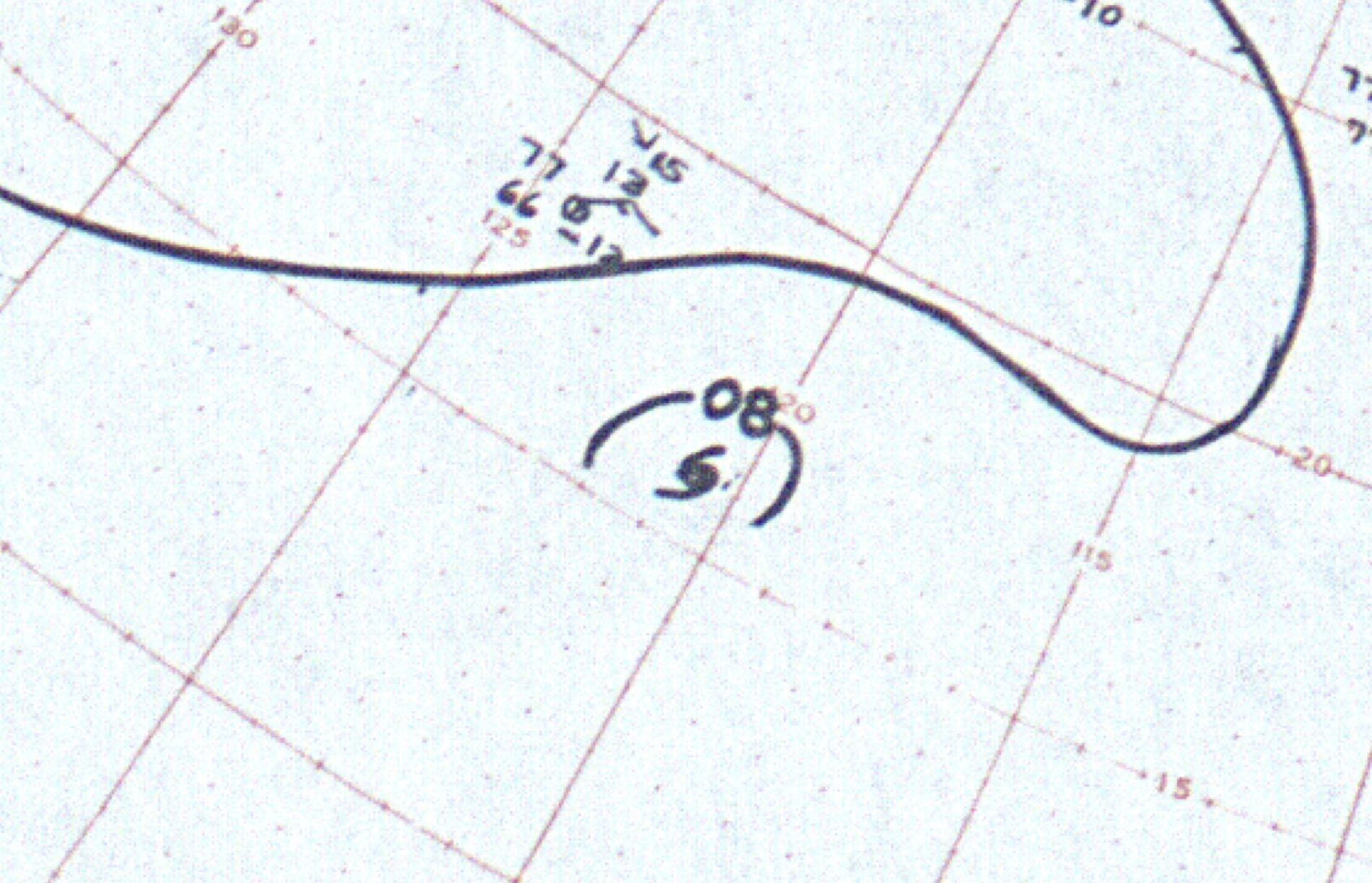
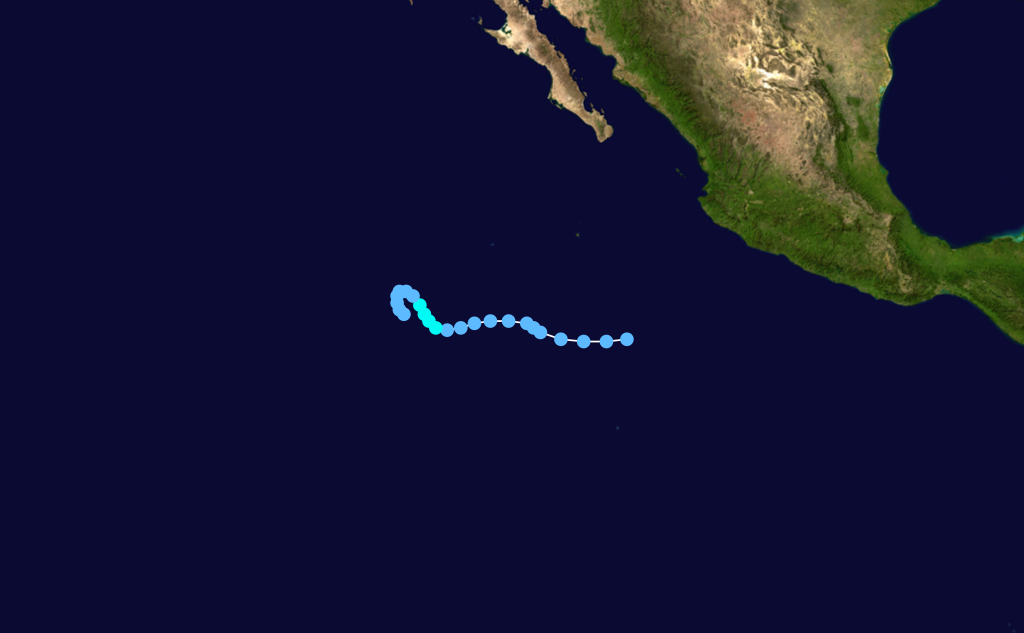
- Duration: September 14 – September 20
- Peak intensity: 50 mph (85 km/h) (1-min); 1001 mbar (hPa; 29.56 inHg)

During the late evening of September 14, Tropical Depression Fifteen formed far away from land. The depression took a long time to strengthen and became a tropical storm for only 24 hours late in its life before cooler waters took hold of the system and made it a remnant low on September 20. Joyce was one of the shortest lasting storms of the season.

=== Tropical Storm Kirsten ===
- Tropical storm (SSHWS)
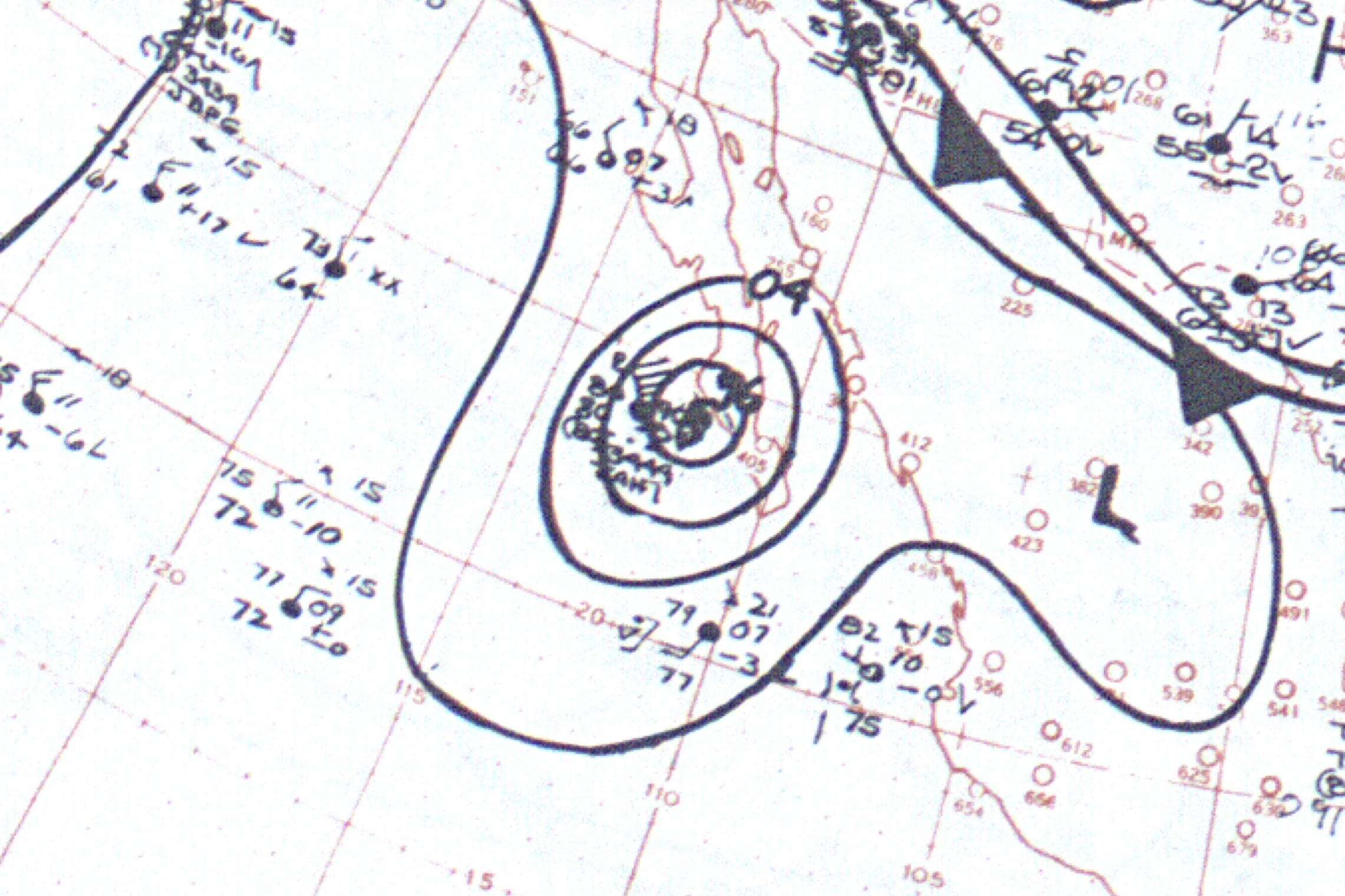
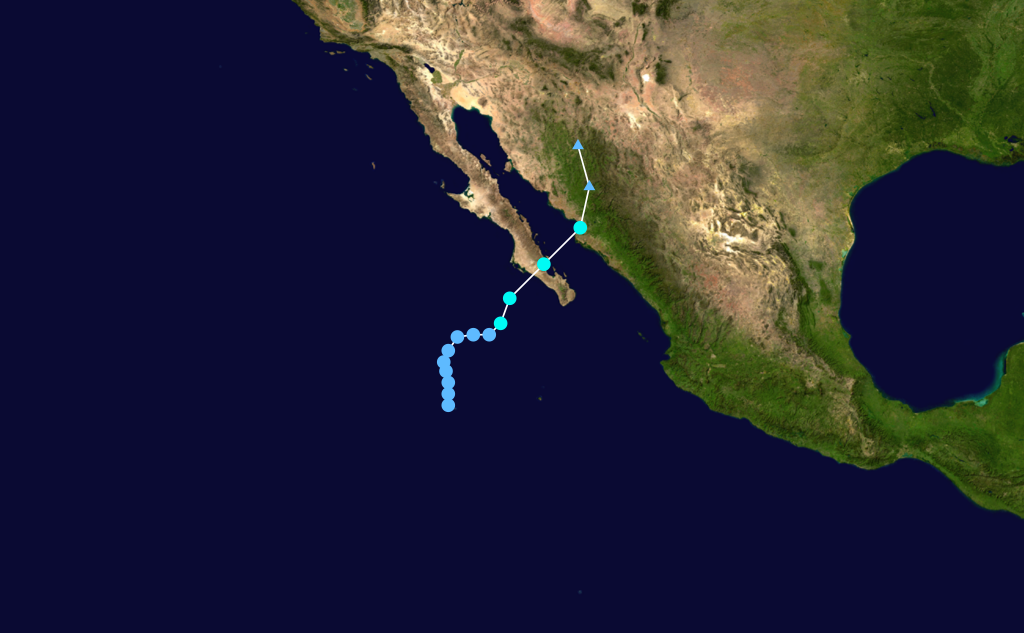
- Duration: September 26 – September 29
- Peak intensity: 50 mph (85 km/h) (1-min); 997 mbar (hPa; 29.44 inHg)

Six days after Joyce's dissipation, a tropical depression formed north of the Intertropical Convergence Zone on the evening of August 25. The storm was then named Tropical Depression Sixteen-E. It took an extended amount of time, about three days before it intensified into a tropical storm. The storm was designated as Tropical Storm Kirsten.

After it was upgraded, Kirsten swept the Baja California Peninsula, mainly Baja California Sur. Kirsten made landfall again about halfway between Los Mochis and Ciudad Obregón, Mexico. Kirsten weakened, but maintained tropical storm status before making landfall in Sinaloa. While making landfall, Kirsten made extensive damage in the peninsula. The winds of Kirsten were up to 50 knots (58 mph) while making landfall. Kirsten degenerated into a remnant low on September 28 and dissipated on September 29 near Navojoa.

Kirsten caused at least eight deaths in Ciudad Obregón and an estimated damage of $5.6 million (equivalent to $55.57 million in 2025). Flooding and strong winds destroyed more than 1000 homes. After the storm dissipated, the Mexican Defense Ministry gave provided food, medical supplies, and temporary shelter to the victims of Kirsten, mainly in Sinaloa and Sonora.

=== Tropical Storm Lorraine ===
- Tropical storm (SSHWS)
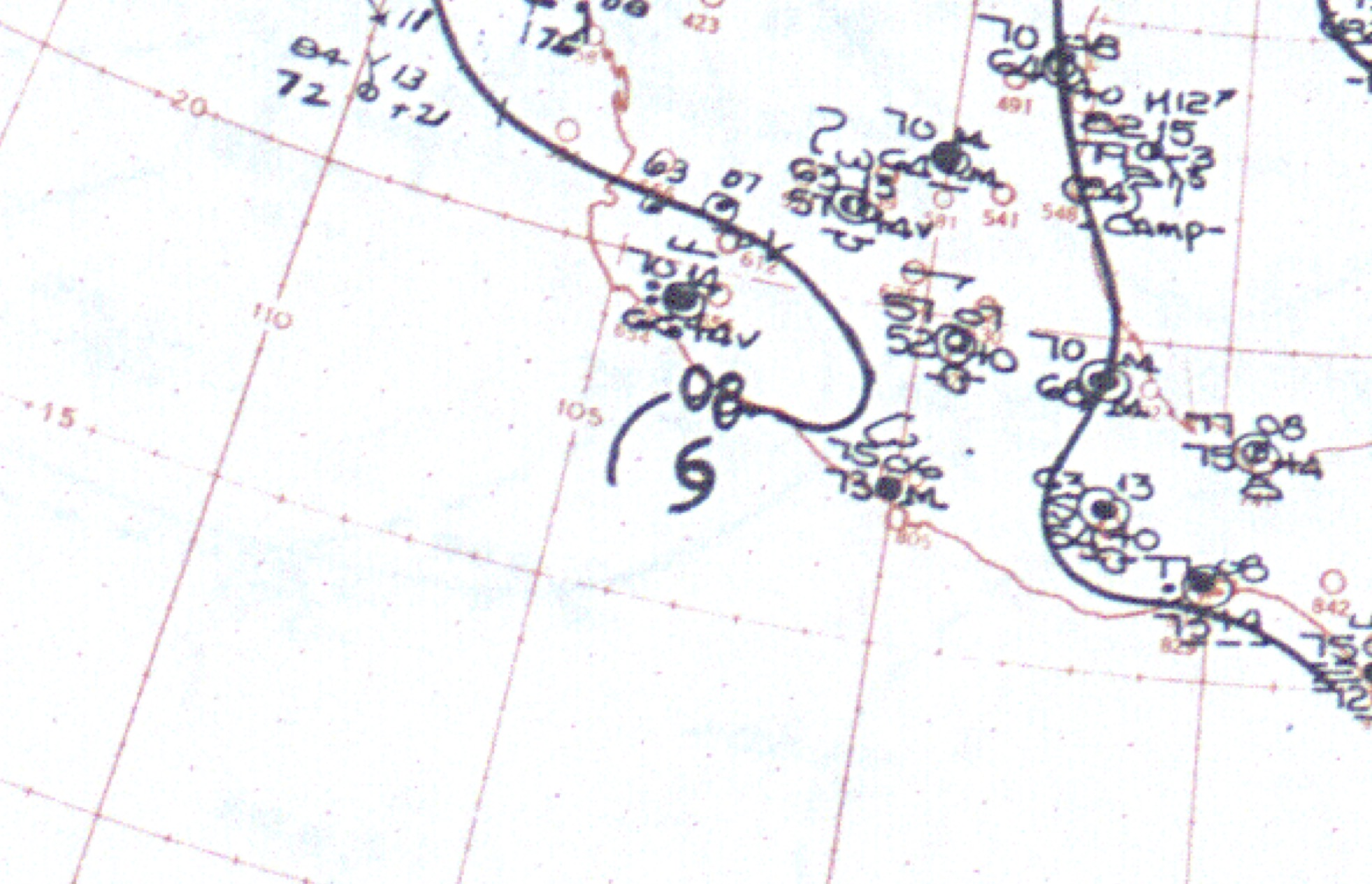
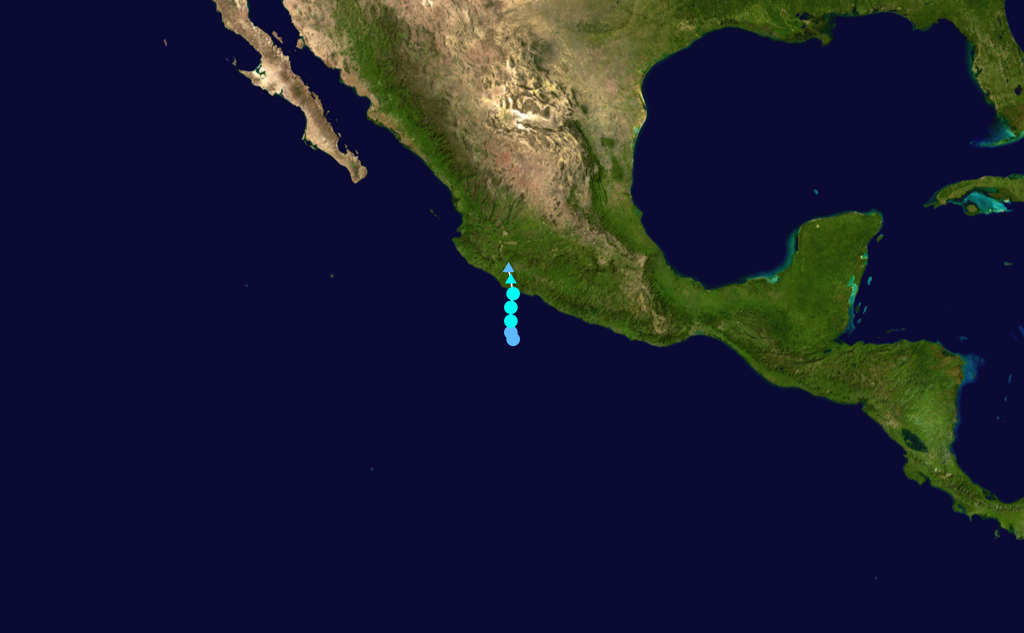
- Duration: October 3 – October 5
- Peak intensity: 50 mph (85 km/h) (1-min); 1002 mbar (hPa; 29.59 inHg)

Near the end of the season Tropical Depression Sixteen formed while south of Mexico. The depression quickly intensified and became a tropical storm and was named Lorraine. Lorraine made landfall west of Tecoman, Mexico and quickly dissipated. Lorraine brought rain to Mexico in areas that would get rain from Tropical Storm Maggie a few days later. Lorraine caused no reports of damage or deaths in Mexico.

=== Tropical Storm Maggie ===
- Tropical storm (SSHWS)
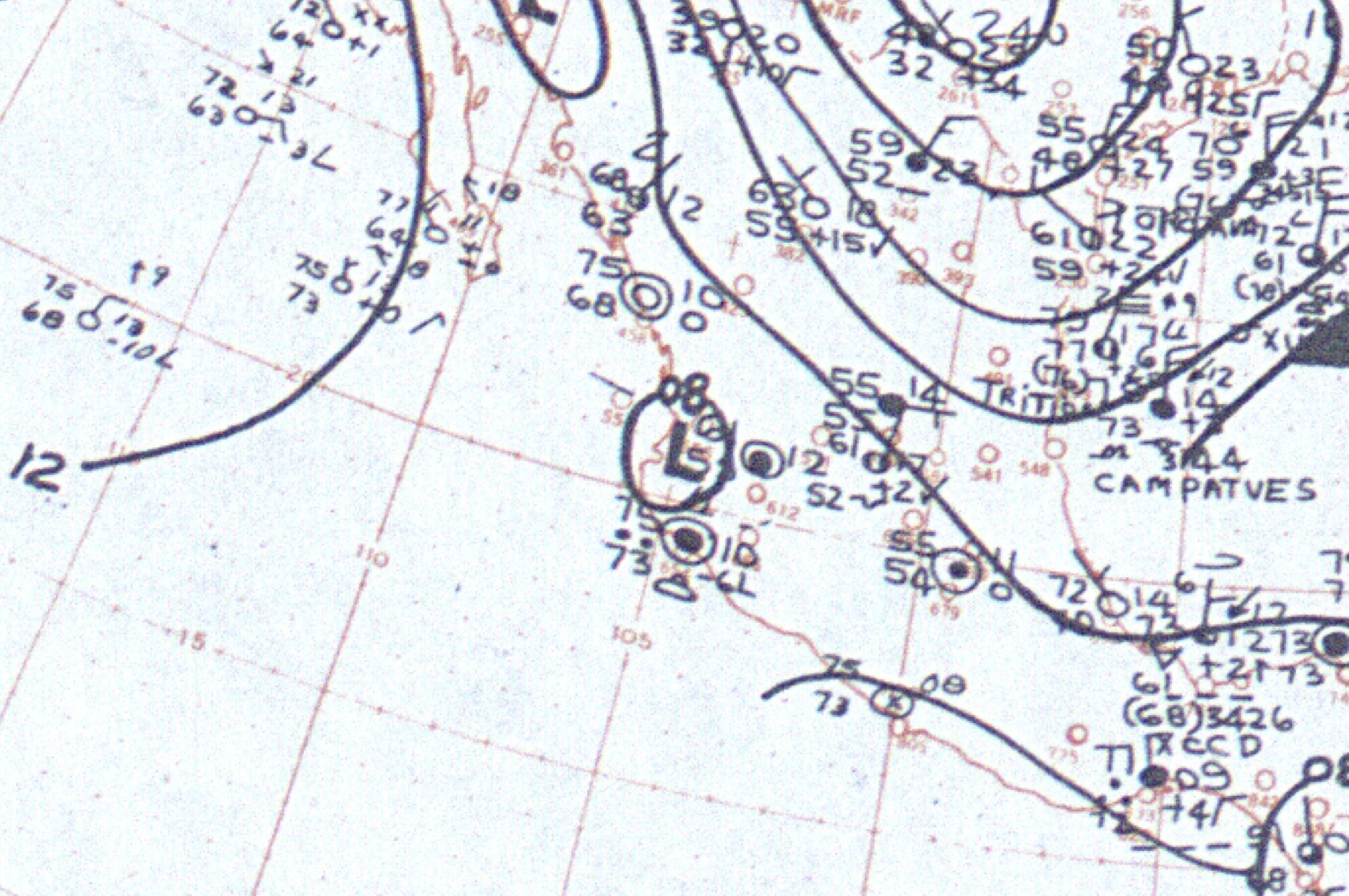
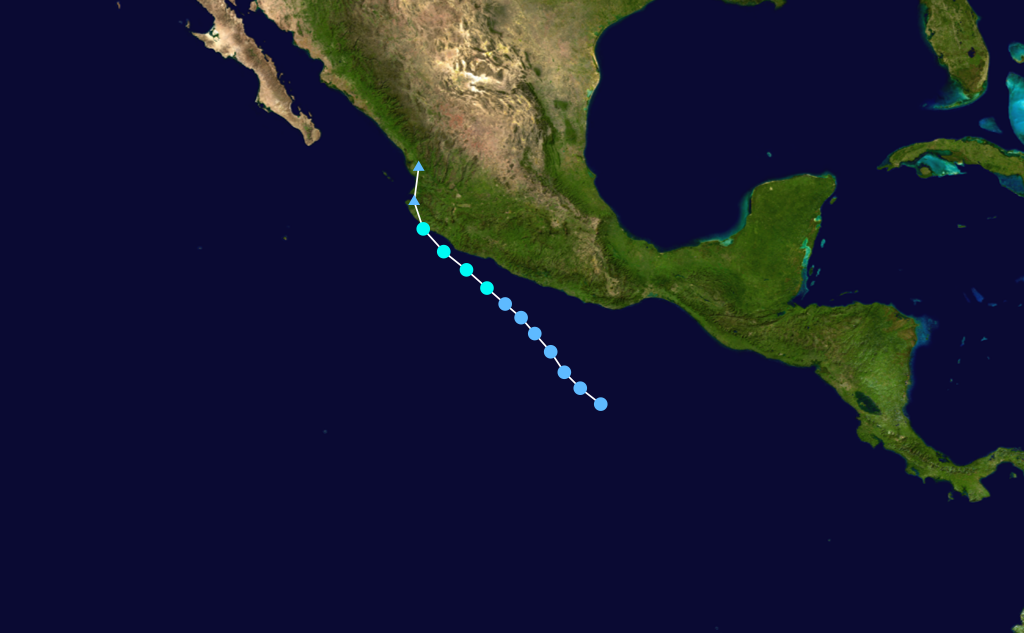
- Duration: October 16 – October 19
- Peak intensity: 50 mph (85 km/h) (1-min); 1002 mbar (hPa; 29.59 inHg)

On October 16, Tropical Depression Eighteen formed while south of Mexico. The depression, like Joyce and Kirsten before it took a long time to become a tropical storm. Finally on October 18 the depression strengthened and became Tropical Storm Maggie, the final tropical storm of the season. Maggie brought torrential rains to areas affected by Lorraine earlier in the month as it paralleled the Mexican coast. It finally made landfall near Manzanillo, Mexico and weakened into a tropical depression while near Puerto Vallarta. The depression briefly emerged off the coast before making landfall near Puerto Vallarta for the last time. Maggie dissipated shortly afterward. Maggie caused no reports of damages or deaths.

=== Other system ===
- Tropical storm (SSHWS)
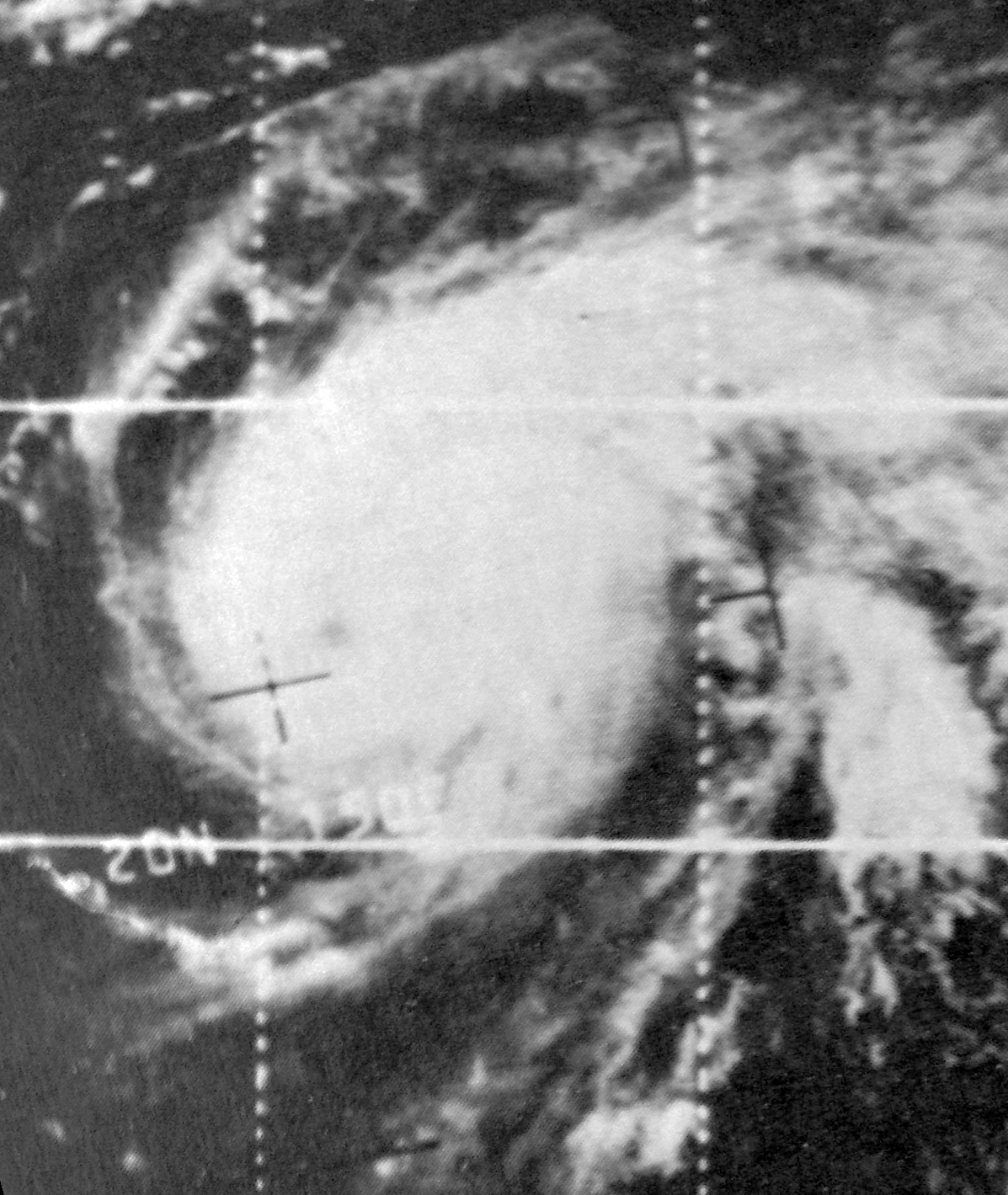
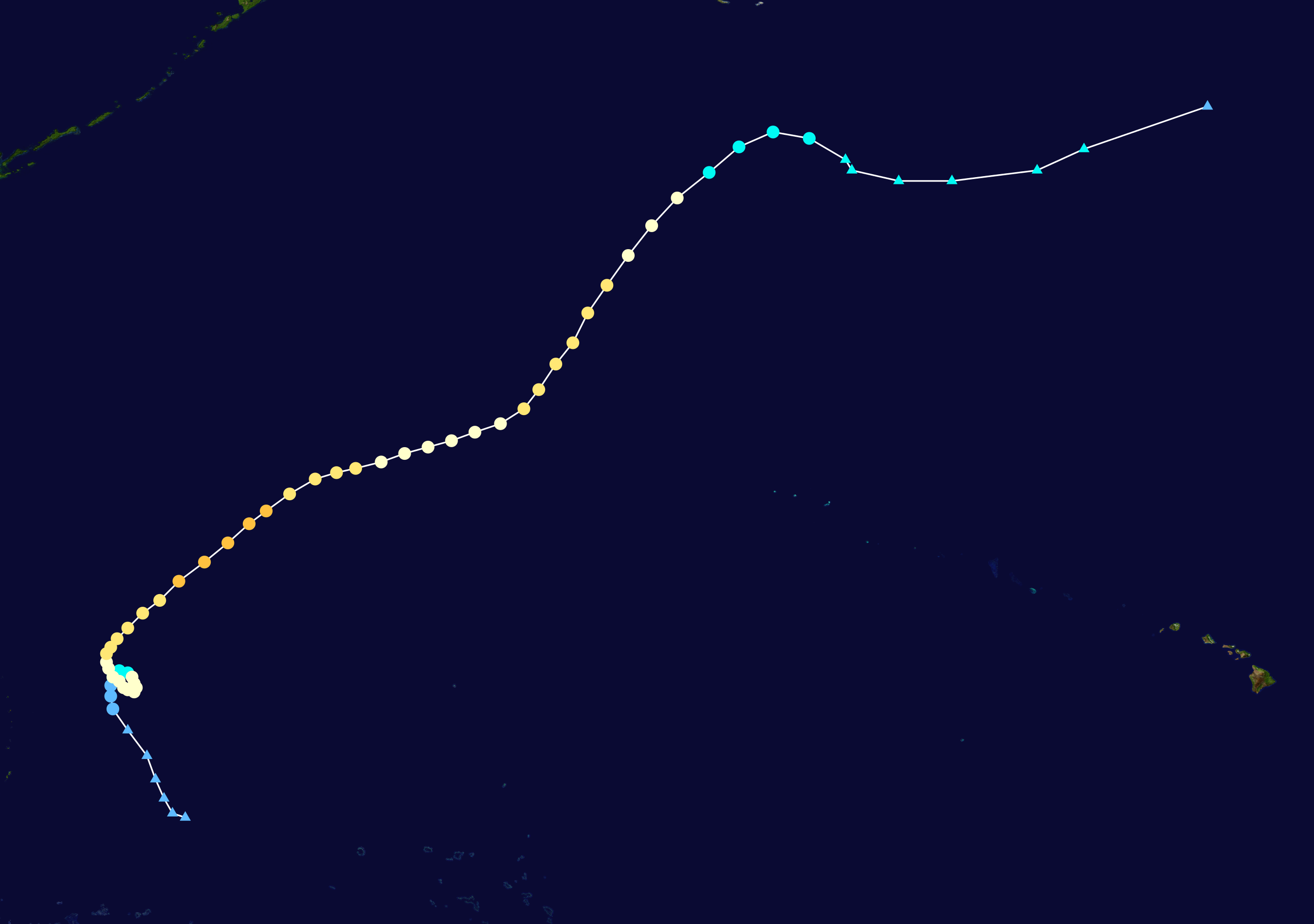
- Duration: October 20 (Entered basin) – October 21
- Peak intensity: 65 mph (100 km/h) (1-min); 958 mbar (hPa; 28.29 inHg)

According to the Joint Typhoon Warning Center and Japan Meteorological Agency, on October 20 Tropical Storm Kathy crossed the International Dateline, entering into CPHC's area of responsibility; however, this storm was not included into CPHC database. The storm eventually became extratropical on October 21 over open waters.

== Storm names ==
The following list of names was used for named storms that formed in the North Pacific Ocean east of 140°W in 1966. This was the third of four sets of storm names introduced at the start of the 1960 season. As only names in sets one and two had been used through the 1965 season, every name used in 1966 was used for the first time. Also, this was the first season in which sets of names were cycled on an annual rotation basis beginning with the "A" name each year. This set, with the exception of Kirsten, which was replaced by Kristen, was reused for the 1970 season.

- Adele
- Blanca *
- Connie *
- Dolores
- Eileen
- Francesca
- Gretchen *
- Helga
- Ione
- Joyce
- Kirsten
- Lorraine
- Maggie
- Norma (unused)
- Orlene (unused)
- Patricia (unused)
- Rosalie (unused)
- Selma (unused)
- Toni (unused)
- Vivian (unused)
- Winona (unused)

Had any tropical storms formed in the North Pacific between 140°W and the International Date Line in 1966, their names would have been drawn from the Western Pacific typhoon naming list. Named storms in the table above that crossed into the area during the year are noted (*).

== See also ==
- List of Pacific hurricanes
- 1966 Atlantic hurricane season
- 1966 Pacific typhoon season
- 1966 North Indian Ocean cyclone season
- Australian region cyclone seasons: 1965–66 1966–67
- South Pacific cyclone seasons: 1965–66 1966–67
- South-West Indian Ocean cyclone seasons: 1965–66 1966–67
