= Dirección General @prende.mx =

Mexican educational TV network

- Type: Broadcast television network
- Country: Mexico
- Availability: National; also distributed in Central America and certain regions of the United States
- Owner: Instituto Latinoamericano de la Comunicación Educativa, (ILCE); General Directorate @prende.mx, Ministry of Public Education, Government of Mexico.
- Launch date: 1994
- Official website: www.gob.mx/aprendemx

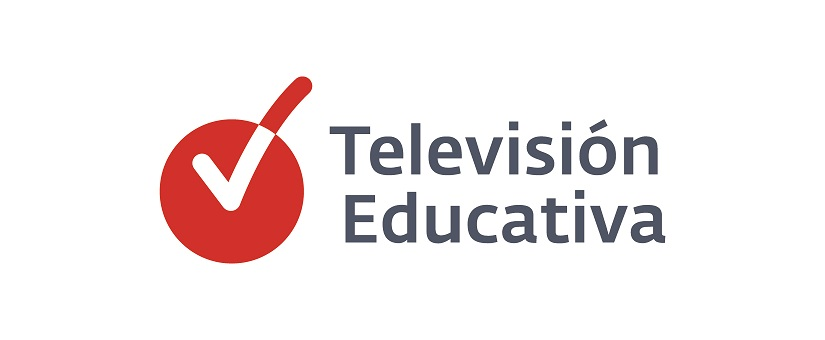

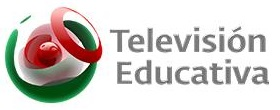

Dirección General @prende.mx, formerly known as Dirección General de Televisión Educativa, is the producer of educational programs of the Secretariat of Public Education of Mexico with origins dating back to 1968. Which are broadcast on the Red EduSat, an educational television network. "EduSat" is a portmanteau of "Education" and "Satellite".

== History ==
The government of Mexico implemented Telesecundaria in 1968 to provide secondary education to students in rural areas through broadcast television channels, such as XHGC-TV in Mexico City. With the launching of the Morelos II satellite, Telesecundaria began transmitting on one of its analog channels in 1988. In 1994, Telesecundaria began broadcasting in a digital format with the advent of the Solidaridad I satellite, and Edusat was born and began transmitting on six channels. The signal was moved to Solidaridad II in 2000.

In 2008 Edusat services migrated to Satmex 5, by this time with signal power five times what it was during the Morelos II era and the number of channels increased to 10 with capacity for six more and a larger area of coverage. Today, Televisión Educativa resources are received by more than 36,000 set-top boxes located in Mexico and 1,000 in other areas of the continent. The technological component is managed by the Secretaría de Comunicaciones y Transportes (SCT) and Telecomunicaciones de México (Telecomm).

Although the signal is available in all of the Americas (except for the eastern part of Brazil) Edusat services are only offered in Mexico, Central America and certain regions of the United States.

In early August 2020, the COVID-19 pandemic led to the Mexican government signing contracts with commercial TV broadcasters Televisa, TV Azteca, Grupo Imagen, and Grupo Multimedios, the public TV broadcasters and 36 radio stations to air school student targeted programming over their networks. Each of the four commercial TV broadcasters will launch a new subchannel on their digital broadcasting multiplexes. Production and content for these programs was made by both the Ministry of Public Education (SEP) and Canal Once. From 8am to 7pm every weekday from August 24, more than 4,550 television programs and 640 radio programs will be broadcast in 20 languages at primary and high school level.

== Red EduSat ==
Red EduSat transmits 13 television services, seven of which it programs, in addition to three public radio stations:

=== Red EduSat-Programmed ===
- 11 Telesecundaria (for Secondary Students)
- 12 Capacita TV (to teach teachers, was previously called "TV Docencia")
- 17 Telebachillerato (for senior secondary students)
- 24 @prende TV (for secondary students and adults)
- 26 Especiales (special events channel)
- 27 Telesecundaria+ (for secondary students)
- 30 @prende+ (for learners of all ages)

@prende+ is also available outside of the Red EduSat System on some terrestrial SPR multiplexes. Additionally, various educational television stations in Mexico, particularly university-run stations such as TV UNAM and XHMNU-TDT in Monterrey, also air a selection of programming from Televisión Educativa.

Tele México (a channel for Mexican citizens living in the United States) was on 21. TV Universidad (for university students) was on 22. Red de las Artes (an arts and culture channel) was on channel 23.

=== ILCE ===
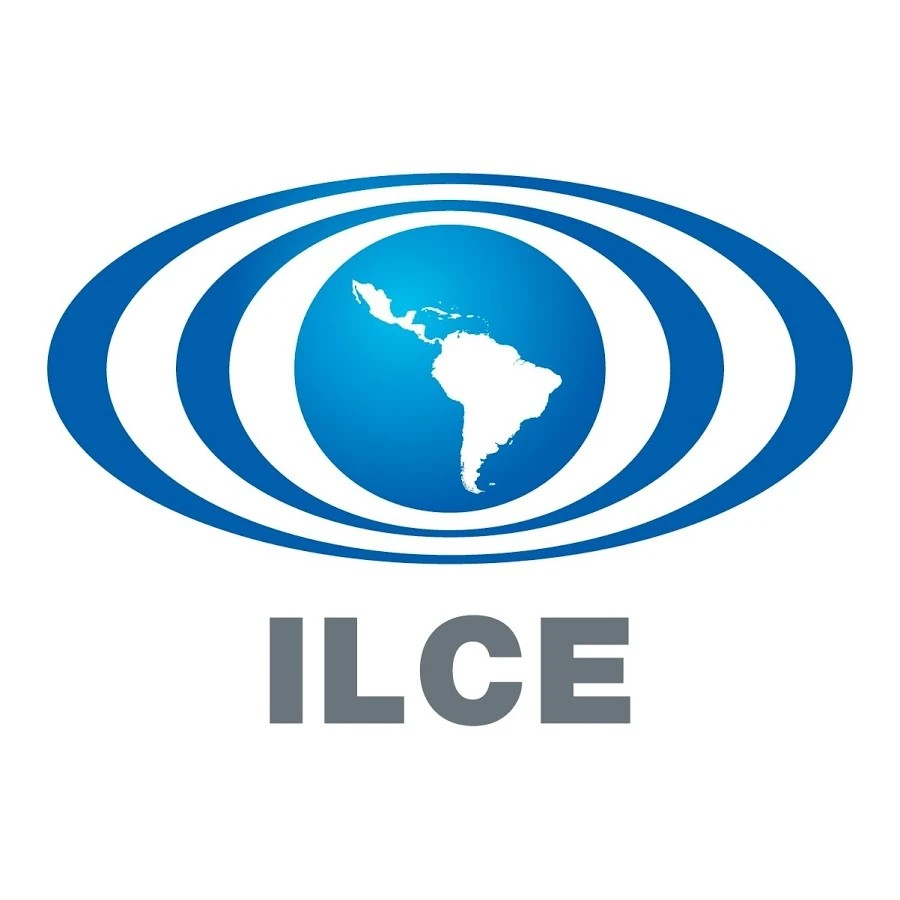

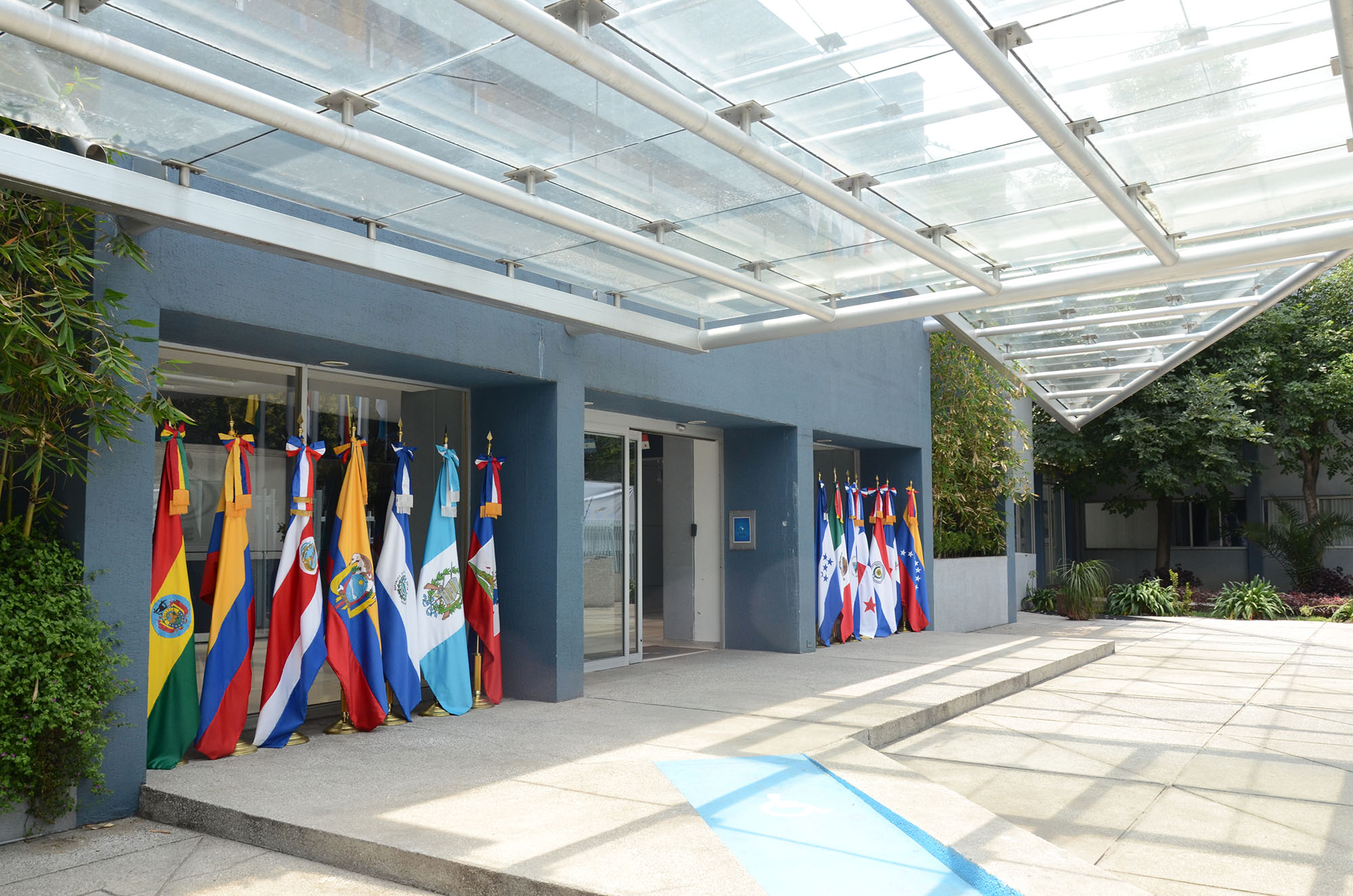

Instituto Latinoamericano de la Comunicación Educativa, (ILCE). (Latin American Institute of Educational Communication) operates two Red EduSat Channels:

- 15 Summa Saberes (educational channel for students)
- 18 Canal Internationale (Ibero-American science and culture channel, was previously called "Canal Iberoamerica")

ILCE once also operated "Innova Conocimiento" on 13 and "EduSat Space" on 16.

www.ilce.edu.mx

=== Other educational television services ===
- 21 Discovery Kids
- 23 Canal 22
- 25 Canal del Congreso
- 28 TV•unam

Canal Cl@se (Clase) was on 22. UNAD (Universidad Nacional Abierta y a Distancia)'s TV service was also carried.

=== Radio ===
- 12 Radio Educación
- 15 Instituto Mexicano de la Radio
- 28 Radio UNAM

== See also ==
- Education in Mexico
