= XHCHZ-FM =

Radio station in Chiapa de Corzo, Chiapas

- Chiapa de Corzo, Chiapas; Mexico
- Frequencies: 107.9 MHz (HD Radio)
- Branding: Radio Lagarto

Programming
- Format: Varied

Ownership
- Owner: Instituto Mexicano de la Radio

History
- First air date: September 16, 1987
- Former frequencies: 1560 AM

Technical information
- Class: B1
- ERP: 25 kW
- HAAT: -271.38 m
- Transmitter coordinates: 16°42′38″N 93°00′30″W

Links
- Webcast: XHCHZ-FM
- Website: http://www.imer.mx/radiolagarto/

XHCHZ-FM is a radio station in Chiapa de Corzo, Chiapas, Mexico. Broadcasting on 107.9 FM, XHCHZ-FM is owned by the Instituto Mexicano de la Radio and broadcasts a music and information format under the name "Radio Lagarto".

== History ==
In the mid-1980s, an accord between IMER and the government of Chiapas led to the establishment of three new IMER stations: XERA-AM in San Cristóbal de las Casas, XECAH-AM in Cacahoatán and XEMIT-AM in Comitán. In 1990, this was split, and XERA stayed with the government of Chiapas while XECAH and XEMIT remained with IMER. As a replacement, XECHZ-AM 1560 took to the air in 1991. XECHZ broadcast with 4.5 kW of power (due to an older transmitter), increasing its power to 20 kW with a new transmitter in 1994.

In 2012, XHCHZ-FM 107.9 was signed on as part of the AM-FM migration campaign currently underway among Mexican radio stations.

=== XHCHZ broadcasts in HD Radio ===
- HD2 is a simulcast of XEB-AM.
- HD3 is a simulcast of XEQK-AM.
