= Raúl Zambrano =

Mexican guitarist (born 1969)

Raúl Zambrano (born November 6, 1969) is a Mexican guitarist. He is mainly interested in Manuel M. Ponce's work for guitar, is founder of The Manuel M Ponce Guitar Quartet (Cuarteto de Guitarras Manuel M Ponce) in 1994 and director of the group since 2002. He collaborated in the creation of a new repertoire for guitar with musicians such as Juan Trigos, Hebert Vázquez, Horacio Uribe, Georgina Derbez, Emil Awad, Aurelio Tello and Julio César Oliva, who dedicated work to both him and his quartet. He created, jointly with Aurelio Tello and El Colegio de México's president, Javier Garciadiego Dantán, the Colmex Choir (Coro Colmex, which has been directed, since its first concert at the end of 2011, by Aurelio Tello, by Zaeth Ritter and Zambrano.

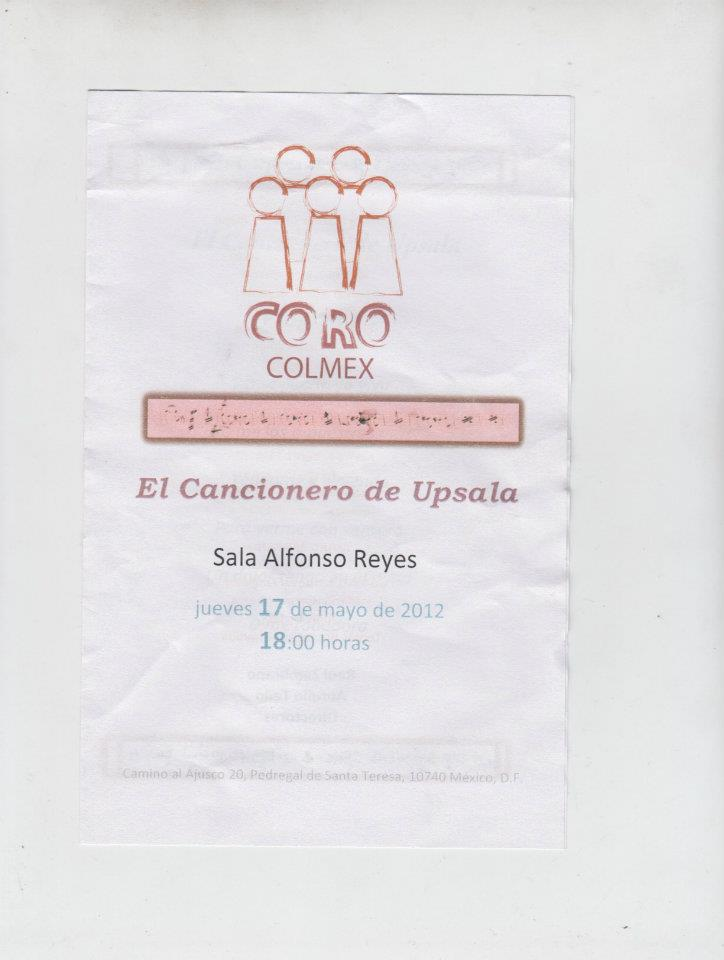
Program presented by Coro Colmex in May 2012

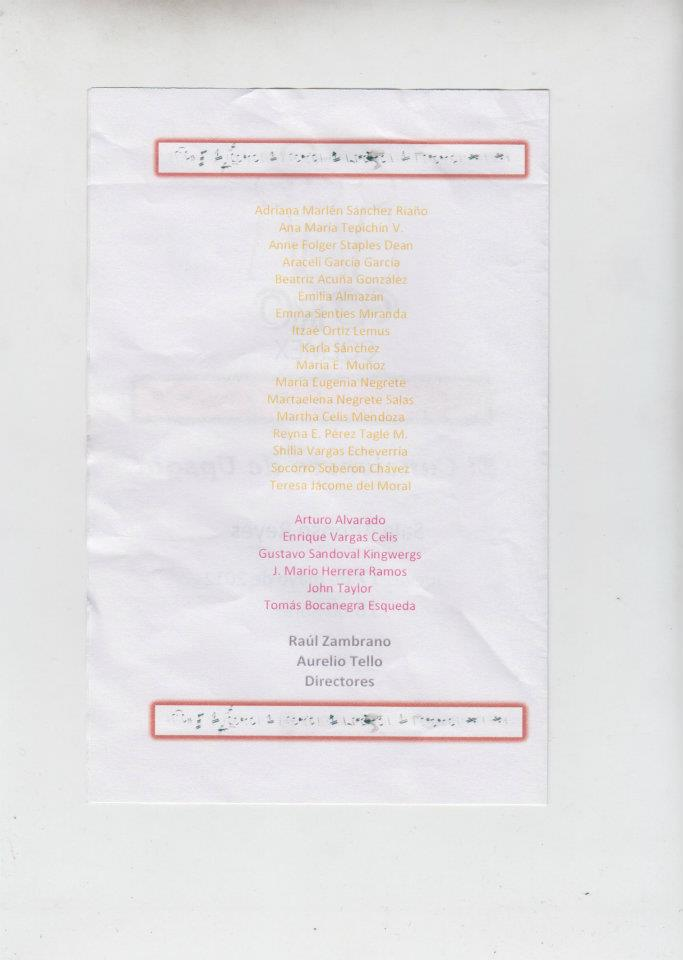
Members of Coro Colmex in May 2012

== Biography ==
Zambrano was born on November 6, 1969 in Tampico. He studied guitar with Manuel López Ramos. He was the director (1997–2005) of the International Guitar Festival at the Gothic Chapel of The Hellenic Cultural Centre in Mexico City. From 2000 to 2005 he produced, with Valeria Palomino and the National Autonomous University of Mexico, the recording of the full guitar works by Manuel M. Ponce (Obra para guitarra de Manuel M Ponce), where eleven prominent guitar players participated. In 2010 he studied, with Dirk Snellings and Capilla Flamenca, a program which establishes the relationship between French-Flemish polyphony and that of Hispanic America's chapels.

== Discography ==
- Ponciana (1999) – with The Manuel M Ponce Guitar Quartet
- Estampas (2000) – with The Manuel M Ponce Guitar Quartet
- Artificios (2001) – with The Manuel M Ponce Guitar Quartet
- De Aranjuez y del sur "Los conciertos de Rodrigo y Ponce" (2004), with Saint Petersburg Philharmonic Orchestra.
- La obra integral de Manuel M. Ponce para guitarra (2006), vol. II, III, IV and V
- Elevación y folía (2007) – with The Manuel M Ponce Guitar Quartet
- Trocar, 4 Johann Sebastian Bach suites (2012), with Erika Dobosiewicz, Asaf Kolerstein and Alberto Cruzprieto.

== Publications ==
- Historia mínima de la música en Occidente (A Short History of Music in the West) (El Colegio de México, 2011)
- Suite en la menor de Manuel M Ponce (Manuel M Ponce's Suite in A minor). Transcription of Andrés Segovia's recording of October 6, 1930, as compared with a minimal discography of the editions of this work. (Proyecto Editorial Manuel M Ponce, Escuela Nacional de Música, UNAM, 2012)

== Radio ==
Several radio projects for the broadcasting of academic music have been produced and hosted by Zambrano:

- Aria de divertimento (three seasons) (2003–2007) in Radio UNAM;
- Hosted La otra versión in XHIMER-FM, of the Instituto Mexicano de la Radio, from 2002;
- Elevación y folía, radio version of Historia Mínima de la Música en Occidente (Minimal History of Music in the West), in Radio México Internacional, of the Instituto Mexicano de la Radio (2010).

== Music for theater ==
Since 1991, Raúl Zambrano has been working with several stage directors, for whom he wrote music:

- Clavos, three-part work about Yerma, Bodas de sangre and La casa de Bernarda Alba, by Federico García Lorca, 1991;
- El villano en su rincón (Lope de Vega), 1996;
- La cueva de Salamanca (Miguel de Cervantes Saavedra), 1997;
- Amor de Don Perlimplín con Belisa en su jardín (Federico García Lorca), 1998;
- El Villano en su rincón (Lope de Vega), 2001;
- Bodas de sangre (Federico García Lorca), 2004;
- ¿A dónde vas, Jeremías? (Philippe Minyana), 2006;
- Casanova o la fugacidad (David Olguín), 2006;
- Frente al olvido (José Caballero), 2007;
- Los locos de Valencia (Lope de Vega), 2007;
- Roberto Zuko (Bernard-Marie Koltés), 2008;
- La pequeña habitación al final de la escalera (Carole Fréchette), 2011.

== Critics ==
"Zambrano makes a great impression in every convincing piece: this is about universal music precisely because it allows us to see its character in detail. A top level recording."

"Raúl Zambrano is a guitarist with a sensitivity, much more inclined towards musical quality than virtuosity. His secret is not to exaggerate, giving each note its precise musical value without falling into the trap of imitation or becoming another version of this successful Mexican concerto, he is a guitarist par excellence. This represents an achievement by and for Zambrano. Sincerely, his meticulous interpretation is always welcome and celebrated."

"I think reading this book should be mandatory for theater people. I think reading it would be simultaneously provocative and delightful for musicians. It is, however, one of those books which, although being surprisingly erudite, can be read with interest by those considering a western man's tough conflict for an expression which finds its purest space in music."
