= XHOF-FM =

Radio station in Mexico City

- Mexico City; Mexico
- Frequency: 105.7 MHz
- Branding: Reactor 105

Programming
- Format: Urban Contemporary, Rock music

Ownership
- Owner: Instituto Mexicano de la Radio
- Sister stations: XEB-AM, XEDTL-AM, XEMP-AM, XEQK-AM; XHIMER-FM, XHIMR-FM; XERMX-OC (defunct)

History
- First air date: May 1, 1969
- Former call signs: XEDO-FM (1967-68, prior to launch)

Technical information
- Licensing authority: CRT
- Class: B
- ERP: 36,080 watts
- HAAT: 12.1 meters (40 ft)
- Transmitter coordinates: 19°16′10.1″N 99°13′59.4″W

Links
- Webcast: XHOF-FM
- Website: http://www.imer.mx/reactor/

XHOF-FM, also known as Reactor 105.7, is a radio station in Mexico City that plays alternative rock music, and hip hop mainly in English and Spanish. Its broadcast frequency is 105.7 MHz. The transmitter site is located in Ajusco south of the city.

XHOF-FM used to broadcast in HD., but the digital signal became silent in early 2020 due to operating costs.

== History ==
=== Radio Departamento ===
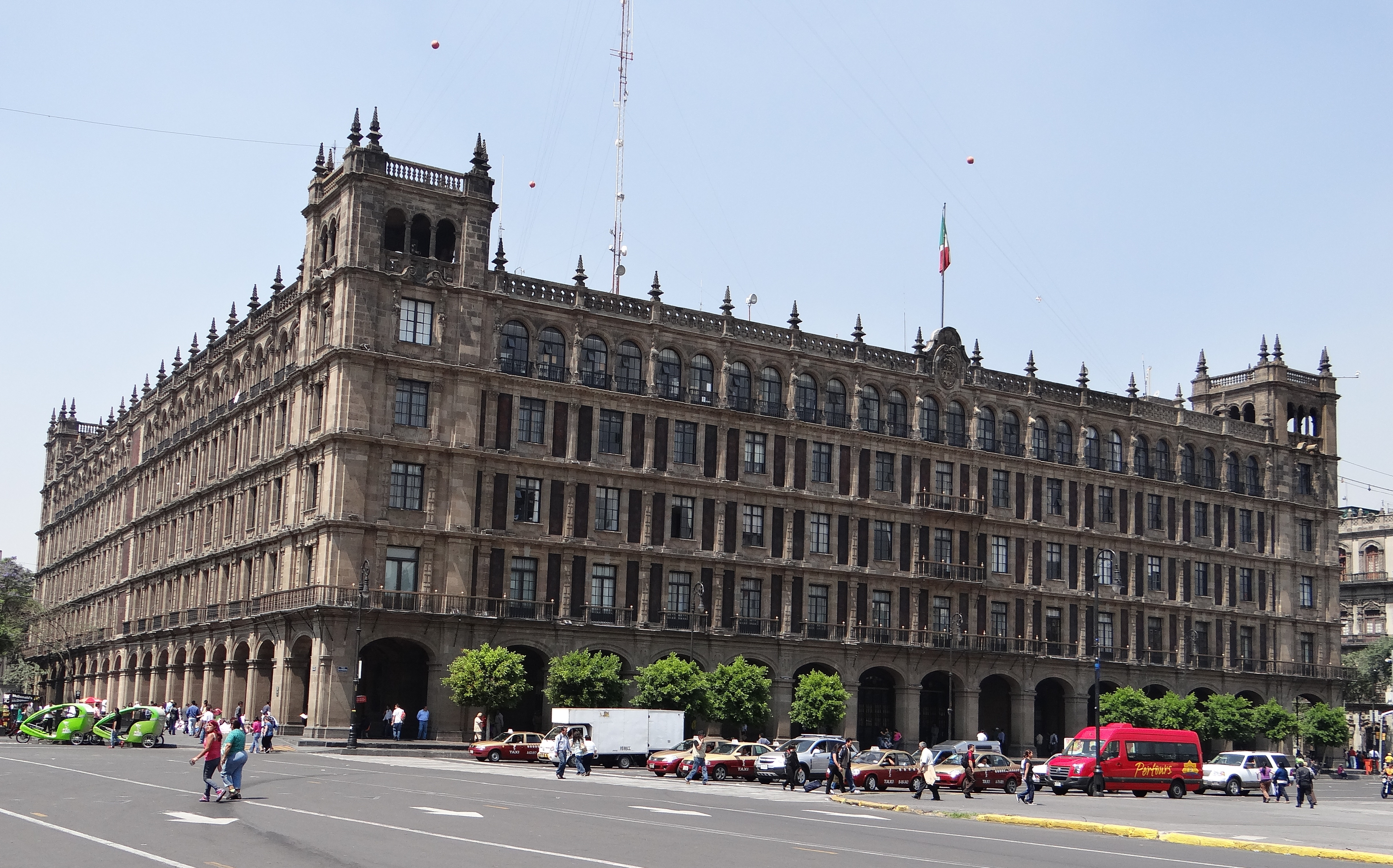
Under the Departamento del Distrito Federal, XHOF-FM broadcast from this building on the Zócalo

The Department of the Federal District (DDF) solicited a permit for a radio station in 1967. However, the station seemed cursed from the beginning. The Department had a hard time procuring the permit; one month after it was issued, the government was still evaluating the technical parameters. Additionally, the original callsign of XEDO-FM had to be changed (in April 1968) when it was discovered that a Michoacán radio station had been using that unique identifier since 1961.

In March 1969, the SCT informed the DDF that the latter still had not complied with the requirements for the construction of the station. "Radio Departamento", however, soon got on track to launch May 1, 1969, from the top floor of the Departamento del Distrito Federal building, with 161 square metres (1,730 ft^{2}) of floor space to work with.

=== To IMER ===
In 1983, the Instituto Mexicano de la Radio was created. IMER included all of the stations operated by the executive branch of the federal government, XHOF included. However, it took the SCT until 2005 to transfer the permit of XHOF to IMER, on the fourth request by the latter. From 1992 to 1994, XHOF was operated by Radio S.A. (RASA) under contract. Meanwhile, the station went through various names and formats: Radio Cosmos, Estéreo Joven, Láser FM, Conexión Acústica and Órbita 105.7. In 2005, the Legislative Assembly of the Federal District asked then-mayor Andrés Manuel López Obrador to take action to "recover" control of the station from IMER, but López Obrador, like his predecessors, did not take any action.

The current Reactor format was formed after the closure of Radioactivo 98.5 and the old Órbita 105.7 format. Some of the most popular and relevant radio hosts of the former stations are now working for Reactor. Because of the official nature of the radio station there is a strong tendency to promote Spanish-speaking or Mexican bands, a situation that has defined the personality of the project as the only opportunity for the independent market of alternative or out-of-the-mainstream bands in Mexico.

In 2019, the SPR's XHSPRM-FM 103.5 in Mazatlán flipped from simulcasting Radio México Internacional to simulcasting Reactor.
