= Alicia Zendejas =

Mexican writer

Alicia de la Peña
- Born: Alicia de la Peña; October 4, 1928; Mexico City, Mexico
- Died: April 22, 2016 (aged 87); Cuernavaca, Morelos, Mexico
- Other names: Alicia Zendejas, Alicia Reyes
- Education: National Autonomous University of Mexico
- Occupation(s): Writer, literary critic, essayist, poet, cultural manager
- Known for: Xavier Villaurrutia Award, Alfonso Reyes International Prize
- Spouse: Francisco Zendejas

Alicia de la Peña, also known as Alicia Zendejas or Alicia Reyes (October 4, 1928 – April 22, 2016) was a Mexican writer, literary critic, essayist, poet and cultural manager. Co-creator, responsible and jury of the Xavier Villaurrutia Award and the Alfonso Reyes International Prize, among other work disseminating the culture of her country.

== Biography ==
Alicia Zendejas was born in Mexico City on 4 October 1928. She completed two master's degrees, one in Literature and the other in Plastic Arts at the National Autonomous University of Mexico (UNAM). Between 1953 and 1967, she and her husband Francisco Zendejas directed the Excélsior Gallery, a cultural and gallery space within the facilities of that newspaper. In 1955 the couple created the Xavier Villaurrutia Award with the aim of promoting Spanish-American literature, with the proviso that the work of these artists be published in Mexico.

She was the promoter and, later, secretary of Relations of the International Alfonsina Society (SAI), which created the International Alfonso Reyes Award, of whom she was the granddaughter. This award was inspired by the denial of the Nobel Prize to Alfonso Reyes, so this prize was created to reward and recognize Spanish-speaking writers from many countries, with Jorge Luis Borges the first winner in 1973. She was also the promoter of the foundation and operation of the Alfonsina Chapel in Mexico City and Monterrey, and the creation and preservation of the archives of Bernardo Reyes and Alfonso Reyes himself.

Within her literary production, she was an essayist, literary critic, prologue writer, researcher and poet. For several decades she conducted the radio capsules "Todo lo que somos está en los libros", dedicated to the promotion of Mexican and Latin American literature, transmitted by Opus 94 of the Mexican Institute of Radio.

She died in Cuernavaca, Morelos, on April 22, 2016.
