= XHSCO-FM =

IMER radio station in Salina Cruz, Oaxaca

Salina Cruz, Oaxaca; Mexico
- Frequencies: 96.3 MHz (HD Radio)
- Branding: Estéreo Istmo

Programming
- Format: Public radio

Ownership
- Owner: Instituto Mexicano de la Radio

History
- First air date: December 7, 1985
- Former call signs: XHGAS-FM (1985-89)

Technical information
- Class: B1
- ERP: 10.42 kW
- HAAT: 109.18 m
- Transmitter coordinates: 16°10′17″N 95°12′40″W

Links
- Webcast: XHSCO-FM
- Website: http://www.imer.mx/estereoistmo/

XHSCO-FM is a radio station in Salina Cruz, Oaxaca, Mexico. Broadcasting on 96.3 FM, XHSCO-FM is owned by the Instituto Mexicano de la Radio and broadcasts a news and music format under the name "Estéreo Istmo".

XHSCO-FM broadcasts in HD.

== History ==
In the early 1980s, PEMEX began exploring the idea of constructing a radio station in the Istmo region, home to many oil facilities, in order to connect the region and the petroleum industry. In 1982, the frequency of 96.3 MHz was assigned, and XHGAS-FM came to air on December 7, 1985 from a transmitter facility located atop a hill within the oil company's facilities. PEMEX programmed 96.3 FM with music for 10 hours a day, but it could not keep the station on air. Longer and longer periods of time off air endangered the station's permit, and in 1987, the Instituto Mexicano de la Radio began operating XHGAS-FM on PEMEX's behalf. IMER changed the station's format to one of news and information, for a region relatively isolated from political and economic centers. In 1989, IMER changed the station's callsign to the current XHSCO-FM and introduced its current branding and format.

=== XHSCO broadcasts in HD Radio ===
- HD2 is a simulcast of XEB-AM.
- HD3 is a simulcast of XEQK-AM.
