= Channel 18 TV stations in Mexico =

The following television stations broadcast on digital channel 18 in Mexico:

- XHCRT-TDT in Cerro Azul, Veracruz
- XHCTAG-TDT in Aguascalientes, Aguascalientes
- XHCTZ-TDT in Coatzacoalcos, Veracruz
- XHFX-TDT in Morelia, Michoacán
- XHGZP-TDT in Torreón, Coahuila
- XHHAS-TDT in Huásabas, Sonora
- XHHCU-TDT in Mexico City
- XHKF-TDT in Colima, Colima
- XHMEX-TDT in Mexicali, Baja California
- XHQCZ-TDT on Cerro del Zamorano, Querétaro
- XHSEN-TDT in Santiago Ixcuintla, Nayarit
- XHSFS-TDT in San Felipe de Jesús, Sonora
- XHSGU-TDT in Guaymas, Sonora
- XHSOZ-TDT in Sombrerete, Zacatecas
- XHSPRSC-TDT in San Cristóbal de las Casas, Chiapas
