= XEUN-FM =

UNAM radio station in Mexico City

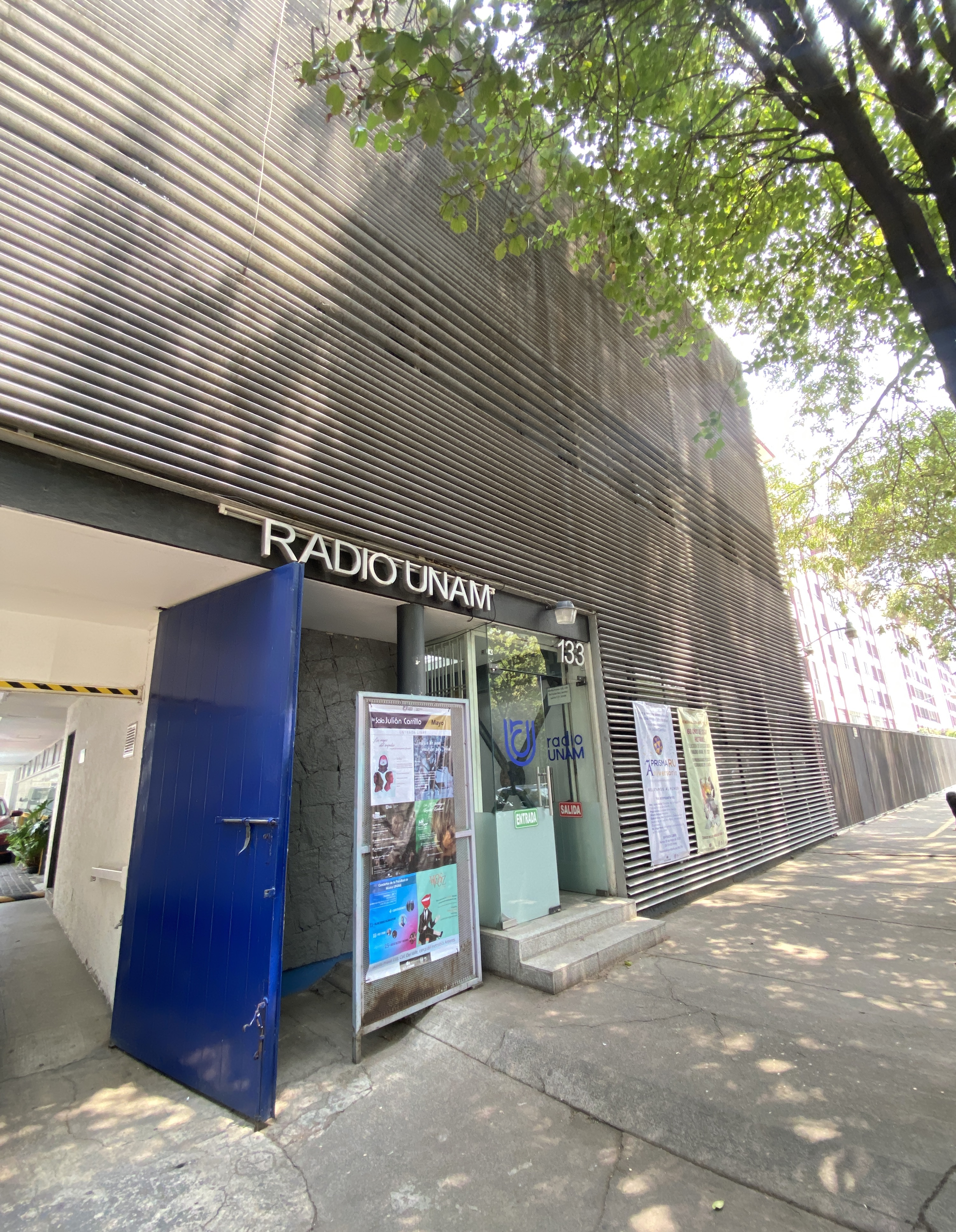
- Radio UNAM studios
- Mexico City; Mexico
- Broadcast area: Greater Mexico City
- Frequency: 96.1 FM
- Branding: Radio UNAM

Programming
- Format: University cultural (music)

Ownership
- Owner: National Autonomous University of Mexico
- Sister stations: XEUN-AM 860, XHUNAM-TDT 20

History
- First air date: July 16, 1959; 67 years ago
- Call sign meaning: First two letters of UNAM

Technical information
- Licensing authority: CRT
- Class: C1
- ERP: 100 kW
- HAAT: −83.75 meters (−274.8 ft)
- Transmitter coordinates: 19°16′9.1″N 99°12′23.7″W

Links
- Webcast: Listen live
- Website: www.radio.unam.mx

XEUN-FM is a radio station in Mexico City. Broadcasting on 96.1 FM, XEUN-FM is owned by the National Autonomous University of Mexico (UNAM) as a sister to XEUN-AM 860 and XHUNAM-TDT 20.

== History ==
XEUN-FM signed on July 16, 1959, from a transmitter located on the Torre Rectoría (Rectory Tower), broadcasting with 1 kW of power.

XEUN-FM's power was increased to 50 kW when the station moved to new facilities in 1976.

In 1992, the FM station moved to a new tower in Ajusco, on land that had been donated to UNAM in 1986 by the government of the Federal District; the move decreased the station's power to 35 kW, which then increased to its current 100 kW with another new transmitter in 1995.

== Programming ==
XEUN-FM split from its AM simulcast upon the move to Ajusco in 1992. The division of programming across the two stations is specialized: 96.1 FM's broadcast day is composed of largely music programs, while 860 AM features predominantly speech programs.

On March 25, 2020, as a contingency due to the COVID-19 pandemic, Radio UNAM began simulcasting its FM programming on AM until further notice.
