= XERA-AM =

Radio station in San Cristóbal de las Casas, Chiapas, Mexico

- Mexico
- Broadcast area: San Cristóbal de las Casas, Chiapas
- Frequency: 760 kHz
- Branding: Radio Uno

Programming
- Format: Public radio

Ownership
- Owner: Gobierno del Estado de Chiapas

History
- First air date: November 3, 1973

Technical information
- Class: B
- Power: 5,000 watts (day); 500 watts (night)
- Transmitter coordinates: 19°23′49″N 99°6′6″W

Links
- Website: www.radiotvycine.chiapas.gob.mx/Radio-Estaciones/xera-760-am-radio-uno.html

XERA is a radio station in Mexico, broadcasting on 760 AM in San Cristóbal de las Casas, Chiapas, Mexico.

XERA also broadcasts on FM at 101.5 MHz. It is not licensed for this frequency; the only FM station on the frequency in Chiapas is XHDB-FM in Tonalá.

== History ==
On November 3, 1973, XERA-AM took to the air in San Cristóbal de las Casas, owned by the government of the state of Chiapas and the state's first public radio station.

From 1985 to 1990, this station was operated by the Instituto Mexicano de la Radio under a co-operation agreement that saw IMER launch two radio stations in the state. When the government of Chiapas opted to retake control of XERA, IMER built a replacement station, XECHZ-AM Chiapa del Corzo.

Programming on XERA-AM is broadcast in various languages including Tzeltal and Tzotzil.
