= Sistema Público de Radiodifusión del Estado Mexicano =

Mexican public broadcaster

Mexican State Public Broadcasting System
- Sistema Público de Radiodifusión del Estado Mexicano

Agency overview
- Formed: August 13, 2014
- Preceding agency: Organismo Promotor de Medios Audiovisuales
- Type: Decentralized public agency
- Headquarters: Mexico City, Mexico
- Annual budget: MXN$1.014 billion (2021)
- Agency executive: Jenaro Villamil, President
- Website: spr.gob.mx

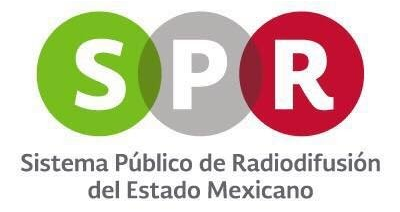

The Sistema Público de Radiodifusión del Estado Mexicano (Mexican State Public Broadcasting System, abbreviated SPR) is an independent Mexican government agency. Its mission is to support the development of public broadcasting in the country and expand its coverage. It carries out this goal through ownership of a nationwide network of transmitters and the management of its own public television channel, Canal Catorce. It also owns four radio transmitters.

== History ==
By 2010, two major public television stations existed in Mexico: the National Polytechnic Institute's Once TV and Conaculta's Canal 22. The National Autonomous University in Mexico also operated low-powered test broadcaster XHUNAM-TDT channel 20 and the TV UNAM pay-TV network. However, not all of these stations, especially Canal 22 and TV UNAM, had national coverage outside of pay television services. None of them had a general national reach above 30%. The only national public television transmitters outside of Mexico City were owned by the IPN, and these did not include many major cities, including Guadalajara and Monterrey.

As a result, on March 31, 2010, a decree established the Organismo Promotor de Medios Audiovisuales (Promoting Organization for Broadcast Media, OPMA) to build new digital-equipped transmitter facilities, with the goal of increasing national coverage of public television in Mexico. When the first four OPMA transmitters were launched on July 12, 2010, national coverage for Canal Once (then known as Once TV México) jumped from 28% to 42%; by 2019, Canal Once had 67.5% coverage, the largest of all public television services.

The 2014 Mexican telecommunications reform transformed OPMA into the SPR, effective August 13, 2014. At the same time, the system became an independent agency no longer under the auspices of the Secretariat of the Interior (SEGOB).

Beginning in the OPMA era, the SPR also became a producer of its own content. In 2012, OPMA launched a new channel, originally known as Canal 30 TV México, which included rebroadcasts of programs from Canal Once and Canal 22 as well as new productions. The launch coincided with a new wave of OPMA transmitter sign-ons, including Monterrey and Mexico City.

On August 26, 2015, the IFT awarded the SPR concessions for seven new TV transmitters and two radio stations, the agency's first; it would be nearly six years before any of these TV transmitters was put into service. In 2016, the SPR received another package of seven TV stations, all on VHF, as well as three additional radio stations—the SPR three years later surrendered all of the TV concessions and two of the three radio stations, opting to retain the FM station in Coatzacoalcos, Veracruz, due to budgetary circumstances and a decision to make heavier use of existing public TV transmission infrastructure. A sixth radio station in Colima was approved in 2018.

XHSPO-TDT—the first on air of the 2015 transmitters—began official broadcasts on May 19, 2021, from the Canal Once transmitter site on Cerro de la Pila in Gómez Palacio, Durango. The largest expansion in SPR history was approved by the Federal Telecommunications Institute in June 2021, with the award of concessions for 24 new TV transmitters. On September 24 of the same year, XHSPS-TDT, located in San Luis Potosí, began its broadcasts. The first three 2021 transmitters went into service in February 2022: XHCPBU-TDT in Culiacán on February 14, XHCPBJ-TDT in Durango on February 16 and XHCPBV-TDT in Los Mochis on February 22. On March 16, XHSPY-TDT in Tepic went into service. and on March 31, XHCPAW-TDT in Ciudad Delicias went into service. On June 1, XHCPCN-TDT in Ciudad Juárez went into service, transmitting from the XHUAR-FM antenna of the Instituto Mexicano de la Radio. On July 11, XHCPAV-TDT in Ciudad Cuauhtémoc, Chihuahua and XHCPAY-TDT in Saltillo, Coahuila went into service. On November 23, XHSPG-TDT in Acapulco, Guerrero and XHSPB-TDT in La Paz, Baja California Sur went into service. On December 21, XHCPCR-TDT in Tulancingo, Hidalgo went into service. The first transmitter to go on air in 2023, XHCPAU-TDT in Chihuahua, Chihuahua went into service on May 23.

== Program services ==
=== Canal Catorce ===
SPR's flagship television network, Canal Catorce (Channel 14), broadcasts documentaries and other programs. Its programming is designed to strengthen the democratic values of Mexican society.

=== Altavoz Radio ===
Altavoz Radio, carried on the SPR's eight radio transmitters, is aimed at a youth audience.

=== TV Migrante ===
On March 21, 2025, TV Migrante began broadcasting as a television channel in 25 cities across the country in its first phase; previously, it was a digital signal that was only broadcast online.

== Television transmitters ==
The SPR holds concessions for 57 television transmitters, of which 42 are in operation. The operating transmitters cover 71.11 percent of the population.

In 2018, in order to facilitate the repacking of TV services out of the 600 MHz band (channels 38–51), 12 SPR transmitters were assigned new channels. On August 20 of the same year, all operating SPR transmitters had their call signs changed from XHOPxx to XHSPRxx, the first-ever seven-letter call signs in Mexico.

SPR television transmitters
| Channel | Call sign | City | State | Operating? |
|---|---|---|---|---|
| 15 | XHSPRAG-TDT | Aguascalientes | Aguascalientes | Yes |
| 14 | XHCPAH-TDT | Ensenada | Baja California | Yes |
| 7 | XHCPAO-TDT | Mexicali | Baja California | Yes |
| 9 | XHCPAT-TDT | Tijuana | Baja California | Yes |
| 31 | XHSPB-TDT | La Paz | Baja California Sur | Yes |
| 15 | XHCPCL-TDT | Los Cabos | Baja California Sur | No |
| 32 | XHSPRCC-TDT | Campeche | Campeche | Yes |
| 8 | XHCPER-TDT | Ciudad del Carmen | Campeche | No |
| 5 | XHCPET-TDT | Palenque | Chiapas | No |
| 18 | XHSPRSC-TDT | San Cristóbal de las Casas | Chiapas | Yes |
| 26 | XHSPRTP-TDT | Tapachula | Chiapas | Yes |
| 31 | XHSPRTC-TDT | Tuxtla Gutiérrez | Chiapas | Yes |
| 17 | XHCPAW-TDT | Camargo, Delicias, Jiménez | Chihuahua | Yes |
| 8 | XHCPAU-TDT | Chihuahua | Chihuahua | Yes |
| 18 | XHCPAV-TDT | Ciudad Cuauhtémoc | Chihuahua | Yes |
| 8 | XHCPCN-TDT | Ciudad Juárez | Chihuahua | Yes |
| 30 | XHSPR-TDT | Mexico City | Mexico City | Yes |
| 7 | XHCPAI-TDT | Monclova | Coahuila | No |
| 9 | XHCPAK-TDT | Piedras Negras | Coahuila | No |
| 10 | XHCPAY-TDT | Saltillo | Coahuila | Yes |
| 22 | XHSPO-TDT | Torreón | Coahuila | Yes |
| 21 | XHSPRCO-TDT | Colima | Colima | Yes |
| 9 | XHCPCP-TDT | Manzanillo | Colima | Yes |
| 12 | XHCPBJ-TDT | Durango | Durango | Yes |
| 20 | XHSPRCE-TDT | Celaya | Guanajuato | Yes |
| 34 | XHSPRLA-TDT | León | Guanajuato | Yes |
| 30 | XHSPG-TDT | Acapulco | Guerrero | Yes |
| 15 | XHCPCQ-TDT | Chilpancingo | Guerrero | Yes |
| 2 | XHCPBL-TDT | Taxco, Iguala | Guerrero | No |
| 10 | XHCPCR-TDT | Tulancingo | Hidalgo | Yes |
| 20 | XHSPRGA-TDT | Guadalajara | Jalisco | Yes |
| 30 | XHSPREM-TDT | Toluca | Mexico | Yes |
| 9 | XHCPCU-TDT | Lázaro Cárdenas | Michoacán | Yes |
| 19 | XHSPRMO-TDT | Morelia | Michoacán | Yes |
| 14 | XHSPRUM-TDT | Uruapan | Michoacán | Yes |
| 5 | XHCPCV-TDT | Nuevo Vallarta | Nayarit | Yes |
| 34 | XHSPY-TDT | Tepic | Nayarit | Yes |
| 16 | XHSPRMT-TDT | Monterrey | Nuevo León | Yes |
| 35 | XHSPROA-TDT | Oaxaca | Oaxaca | Yes |
| 30 | XHSPRPA-TDT | Puebla | Puebla | Yes |
| 13 | XHCPFB-TDT | Tehuacán | Puebla | No |
| 30 | XHSPRMQ-TDT | Querétaro | Querétaro | Yes |
| 29 | XHSPQ-TDT | Cancún | Quintana Roo | Yes |
| 25 | XHSPJ-TDT | Chetumal | Quintana Roo | No |
| 12 | XHCPCX-TDT | Ciudad Valles | San Luis Potosí | Yes |
| 23 | XHSPS-TDT | San Luis Potosí | San Luis Potosí | Yes |
| 19 | XHCPBU-TDT | Culiacán | Sinaloa | Yes |
| 10 | XHCPFE-TDT | Guamúchil | Sinaloa | No |
| 34 | XHCPBV-TDT | Los Mochis | Sinaloa | Yes |
| 29 | XHSPRMS-TDT | Mazatlán | Sinaloa | Yes |
| 31 | XHSPROS-TDT | Ciudad Obregón | Sonora | Yes |
| 12 | XHCPDA-TDT | Guaymas | Sonora | Yes |
| 27 | XHSPRHA-TDT | Hermosillo | Sonora | Yes |
| 11 | XHCPFH-TDT | Cárdenas, Huimanguillo | Tabasco | No |
| 25 | XHSPRVT-TDT | Villahermosa | Tabasco | Yes |
| 12 | XHCPBD-TDT | Ciudad Victoria | Tamaulipas | Yes |
| 12 | XHCPEL-TDT | Nuevo Laredo | Tamaulipas | No |
| 7 | XHCPCE-TDT | Reynosa | Tamaulipas | Yes |
| 35 | XHSPRTA-TDT | Tampico | Tamaulipas | Yes |
| 26 | XHSPRCA-TDT | Coatzacoalcos | Veracruz | Yes |
| 10 | XHCPFO-TDT | Córdoba, Orizaba | Veracruz | No |
| 15 | XHCPDC-TDT | Poza Rica | Veracruz | No |
| 19 | XHCPDD-TDT | San Andrés Tuxtla | Veracruz | Yes |
| 35 | XHSPRXA-TDT | Xalapa | Veracruz | Yes |
| 23 | XHSPRME-TDT | Mérida | Yucatán | Yes |
| 17 | XHCPFR-TDT | Valladolid | Yucatán | No |
| 15 | XHSPRZC-TDT | Zacatecas | Zacatecas | Yes |

=== Additional coverage of Canal Catorce ===
In October 2015, the SPR signed a contract with Grupo Intermedia, owner of XHILA-TDT and XHIJ-TDT, in order to expand the coverage of Una Voz con Todos into Mexicali and Ciudad Juárez, neither of which had ever had national public television service. While the SPR prefers to build its own transmitters, the length of time needed to obtain a concession, as well as spectrum availability in the border markets, makes a subchannel plan more effective.

| Subchannel | City |
|---|---|
| XHILA-TDT 66.2 | Mexicali, Baja California |
| XHIJ-TDT 44.3 | Ciudad Juárez, Chihuahua |

One IPN-operated Canal Once transmitter also carries Canal Catorce:

| Subchannel | City |
|---|---|
| XHCIP-TDT 14.1 | Cuernavaca, Morelos |

== Radio stations ==
The SPR received its first radio concessions in 2015 and added three transmitters in 2016—two of which were never built. A sixth station, in Colima, was awarded in 2018. All four air Altavoz Radio.

The Mazatlán and Tapachula transmitters were the first on air. Both initially carried Radio México Internacional, a service of the Instituto Mexicano de la Radio, but the Mazatlán station switched in 2019 to a simulcast of IMER's Reactor 105 in Mexico City. They were joined on October 5, 2020, by XHTZA-FM in Coatzacoalcos and by XHSPRC-FM 102.9 in Colima on February 13, 2021; these stations carried Altavoz Radio from the start.

The SPR held concessions to build stations at 88.7 in Tehuacán (XHTHP-FM) and 104.7 in Matías Romero, Oaxaca (XHMRO-FM), which were surrendered to the IFT in 2019.

On April 26, 2023, the SPR obtained seven new radio concession titles.

| Frequency | Callsign | City |
|---|---|---|
| 101.1 MHz | XHSPRT-FM | Tapachula, Chiapas |
| 103.5 MHz | XHSPRM-FM | Mazatlán, Sinaloa |
| 104.3 MHz | XHTZA-FM | Coatzacoalcos, Veracruz |
| 102.9 MHz | XHSPRC-FM | Colima, Colima |
| 93.3 MHz | XHCPDT-FM | Acapulco, Guerrero |
| 96.1 MHz | XHCPEP-FM | Chihuahua, Chihuahua |
| 92.9 MHz | XHCPED-FM | Ciudad Valles, San Luis Potosí |
| 88.1 MHz | XHCPFW-FM | Los Mochis, Sinaloa |
| 89.7 MHz | XHCPEN-FM | Mérida, Yucatán |
| 95.1 MHz | XHCPFH-FM | Palenque, Chiapas |
| 101.5 MHz | XHCPEB- FM | Tepic, Nayarit |
| 90.5 MHz | XHCPDS- FM | Victoria de Durango, Durango |
| 94.5 MHz | XHCPEL-FM | Villahermosa, Tabasco |
| 88.3 MHz | XHCPFG-FM | Zacatecas, Zacatecas |
| 89.1 MHz | XHCPCQ-FM | Culiacán, Sinaloa |
| 88.9 MHz | XHCPBV-FM | La Paz, Baja California Sur |
| 88.5 MHz | XHCPBW-FM | San Francisco de Campeche, Campeche |
| 104.7 MHz | XHCPBZ-FM | Torreón, Coahuila; Gómez Palacio, Durango |

== Multiprogramming ==
The first OPMA transmitters in service were dual analog and digital facilities; Canal Once was carried on the analog signal, and the digital transmitters broadcast a multiplex of ultimately five channels: Canal Once, Canal 30 TV México (which became Una Voz con Todos), Canal 22, TV UNAM, and Ingenio Tv, an educational service of Televisión Educativa. Later builds were digital-only stations.

Prior to January 2019, all transmitters carried Ingenio Tv. It was removed from transmitters outside of the third wave in order to meet IFT standards on minimum digital broadcasting bitrate that did not allow stations using MPEG-2 compression to handle one HD and four SD channels on a single multiplex. Third-wave transmitters use MPEG-4 compression, which allows all six services to be broadcast.

The SPR stations carry a multiplex of five or six channels. The established networks Canal Once, Canal 22 and TV UNAM are joined by Canal Catorce, which is broadcast in HD. Third-wave SPR transmitters also have Ingenio Tv, an educational channel of the Secretariat of Public Education, and Canal del Congreso, with coverage of Congress.

The Mexico City transmitter only carries Canal Catorce, TV UNAM and Ingenio Tv, owing to the presence of other public television facilities in the capital. In May 2020, the SPR Guadalajara and Monterrey transmitters ceased broadcasting Canal Once as the result of the commissioning of IPN-owned transmitters in those cities.

The Torreón/Gómez Palacio, San Luis Potosí, Culiacán, Durango and Los Mochis transmitters currently do not have any multiprogramming.

The Ciudad Juárez transmitter uses major channel 16 instead of 14 for Canal Catorce because channel 14 was already in use by KFOX-TV in the Ciudad Juárez–El Paso area.

| Channel | Network |
|---|---|
| 11.1 | Canal Once (some stations only) |
| 14.1 | Canal Catorce |
| 14.2 | TV Migrante or @prende+ (some stations only) |
| 20.1 | TV UNAM (some stations only) |
| 22.1 | Canal 22 (some stations only) |
| 45.1 | Canal del Congreso (some stations only) |
