= Maruca Pérez =

- Born: María Valenta Pérez Escamilla; 22 April 1903; Mexico City, Mexico
- Died: 18 March 1937 (aged 33) Mexico City, Mexico
- Genres: Tango; bolero
- Occupation: Singer
- Instrument: Vocals
- Years active: 1929–1937
- Label: Victor

María Valenta Pérez Escamilla (22 April 1903 – 18 March 1937), known professionally as Maruca Pérez, was a Mexican singer, known for being the first female performer of Agustín Lara's songs and one of the first Mexican tango singers. In 1929, she recorded at least four songs—including Lara's "Canalla" and "Mentira"—for the Victor label. She was also an exclusive artist of radio station XEB in the 1930s.

== Discography ==
- "Canalla" (recorded 11 June 1929)
- "Mentira" (recorded 11 June 1929)
- "Flor de fango" (recorded 17 June 1929)
- "Arrepentida" (recorded 17 June 1929)
