= XEB-AM =

Radio station in Mexico City

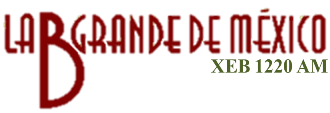
- Mexico City; Mexico
- Broadcast area: Greater Mexico City
- Frequencies: 1220 AM; 94.5 MHz HD2 XHIMER-FM; 89.1 MHz HD2 XHCAH-FM.
- Branding: La B Grande (The Big B)

Programming
- Format: Spanish Classic Hits

Ownership
- Owner: Instituto Mexicano de la Radio
- Sister stations: XEDTL-AM, XEMP-AM, XEQK-AM; XHIMER-FM, XHIMR-FM, XHOF-FM; XERMX-OC (defunct)

History
- First air date: September 14, 1923; 102 years ago
- Former call signs: CYB (1923–1929)
- Call sign meaning: El Buen Tono (original owner)

Technical information
- Licensing authority: CRT
- Class: A
- Power: 100,000 Watts
- Transmitter coordinates: 19°18′33.9″N 99°03′33.2″W

Links
- Webcast: Listen live
- Website: imer.mx/xeb

XEB-AM (1220 kHz, branded as La B Grande) is a public AM radio station in Mexico City. It airs a Spanish-language classic hits format with music from the 1940s to the 1970s. It has been owned by the Instituto Mexicano de la Radio (IMER), a Mexican government public broadcaster, since IMER's founding in 1983.

XEB is a Class A station. It is one of a handful in North America powered at 100,000 watts. It uses a non-directional antenna with its tower off Avenida Tlahuac in Mexico City.

== History ==
=== Launch ===
On June 16, 1923, the first test transmissions were launched of a radio station then known as CYB, as part of the First International Radio Fair. It was founded by a cigarette company, the Compañía Cigarrera del Buen Tono, S.A., as a promotional activity. At the same time, it launched a cigarette brand "Radio".

Its first complete transmission occurred on September 14, 1923, live commentary of the prize fight between Jack Dempsey and Luis Ángel Firpo from New York. José Velasco captured the New York station's signal at Pachuca and relayed the information to Enrique W. Curtiss, who broadcast it over CYB. The next day, the station held its inaugural concert, which included a message from Spanish king Alfonso XIII. From October 1923, CYB broadcast on Tuesdays, Thursdays and Saturdays from 8-9pm. At the end of 1923, CYB broadcast a bullfight for the first time. The next year, it aired live bullfights from the El Toreo ring in Condesa, its first remote broadcast.

While the CYB call letters had been used since the station signed on, it was formally awarded to the station the next year at an international convention in Bern, where Mexico received call signs CYA to CZZ. In Washington in 1929, Mexico switched to call letters beginning with XE and the station became XEB.

=== Radio plays ===
XEB was notable as a station where many important personalities and genres in Mexican radio got their start. In 1929, actress Pura Córdoba founded a drama group devoted to performing radio plays, which laid down the foundation for the genre's success in Mexico. Jorge Marrón, Julio Sotelo and Enrique W. Curtiss all started at XEB, which at this time was located at 665 kHz.

In August 1933, XEB debuted on shortwave as XEBT on 6 MHz. The next year, in October 1934, the AM radio station moved to 1030 kHz. Walter Cross Buchanan was the chief engineer from the mid-1930s, also working at the Instituto Politécnico Nacional where he created the electronic engineering program. He later became the Secretary of Communications and Transport.

=== Wartime ===
From 1942 to 1946, XEB broadcast two prominent newscasts, the "Noticiero Mundial" and "El oído del mundo". These were important broadcasts as conflict broke out in Europe and Asia. World War II brought with it a competition among Mexican radio stations to be first with the latest developments.

On October 12, 1942, XEB inaugurated its new facilities with five studios, two theaters for concerts and a United Press newswire. The station also boasted of its creation of a 40-transmitter network to reach all Mexico. XEB increased to 100 kW of power, but it had trouble maintaining the transmitter as the war effort made finding replacement parts nearly impossible.

In April 1945, XEB was the first station to inform Mexican listeners of the death of U.S. President Franklin Delano Roosevelt, four minutes before its competitors. That same year, it created a sports radio network, featuring popular personalities Julio Sotelo, Fernando Marcos and Cristino Lorenzo.

=== After the war ===
In its early years, XEB presented live musical programs. But by 1946, it was using musical recordings, which were more economical. Never the less, high-profile stars including Miguel Prado, Blanca Estela Pavón and Raquel Moreno remained on XEB.

By 1950, XEB was branded as "La Emisora de las Américas" (The Station of the Americas). On AM, it was already broadcasting at 1220 kHz, its current frequency. On shortwave, XEBT was at 9.625 MHz.

In 1952, XEB was sold to Luis Martínez Vértiz. During this time, sports announcers like Óscar Esquivel and Ángel Fernandez joined the station, which became known as "Voz y expresión de México" the next year. The format consisted of news, sports, romantic music and ranchera music.

=== Sistema Radiópolis ===
In 1957, Emilio Azcárraga acquired XEB and incorporated it into the Radiópolis network. The next year, XEB's studios moved in the same complex as XEQ 940 and XEDF 970. During this era, Alejandro Rodríguez Morán, known as "El Sheriff", devised XEB's longtime slogan "La B Grande de México" and its popular night time program "Serenata XEB", which debuted in 1960.

In 1962, shortwave station XEBT was closed. The Radiópolis stations were branded as the "three points of gold", XEB alongside XEQ and XEDF. A fourth AM station, XERPM 660, was added to the line-up. Later, a fifth station, XEMP 710, was brought into the fold.

=== Radio Fórmula ===
Rogerio Azcárraga Madero bought XEB in 1967, forming Grupo ORO. The station moved to another building. In 1975, the company became known as Radio Fórmula. The station was branded as Radio 3, as it was the highest of Fórmula's three stations on the dial after XERPM 660 and XEMP 710.

=== Government ownership and IMER ===
On December 21, 1978, the ownership of XEB, XERPM and XEMP was taken by the federal government. From then until the formation of the Instituto Mexicano de la Radio in 1983, XEB was operated by the state-owned concessionaire Compañía Nacional de Radiodifusión, S. A.
