= XHCHZ =

XHCHZ may refer to:

- XHCHZ-FM, a radio station in Chiapa del Corzo, Chiapas
- XHCHZ-TV channel 13 (TDT 24), a television station in Chihuahua, Chihuahua
