= Rodrigo Ruiz (composer) =

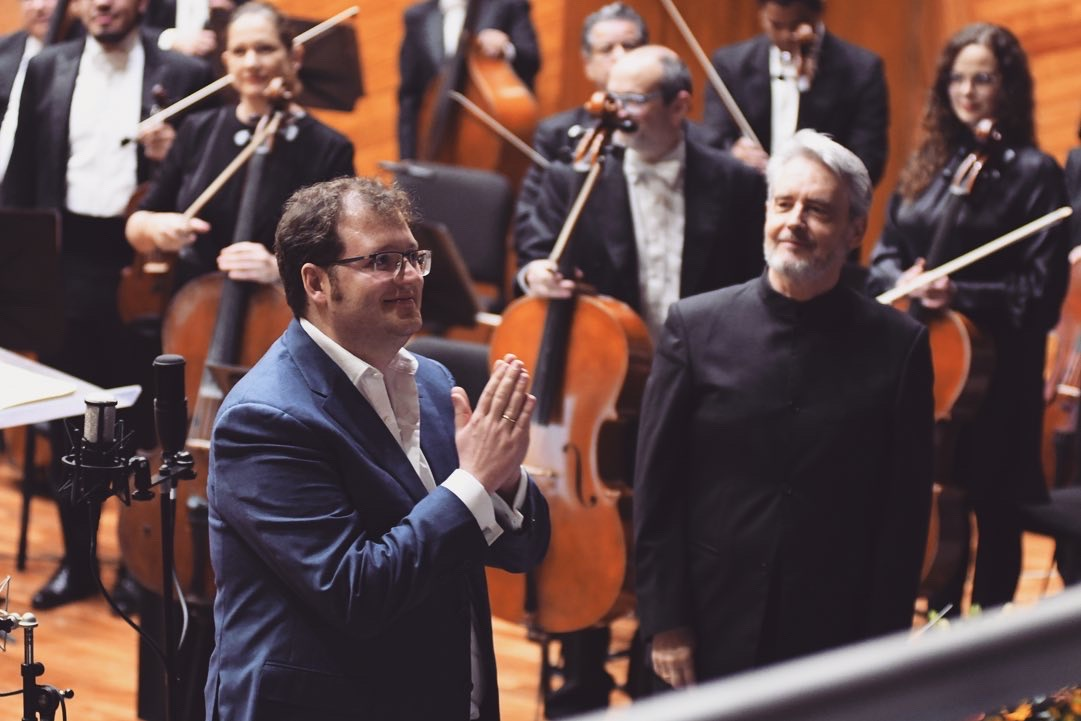
- Rodrigo Ruiz acknowledges applause at the premiere of Varuna, R. 12 No. 2, with conductor José Miguel Rodilla and the Orquesta Sinfónica del Estado de México at the Felipe Villanueva Hall in Toluca, Mexico, on 10 March 2023.

Background information
- Born: October 6, 1988 (age 37); San Diego, California, United States
- Genres: Classical
- Occupation(s): Composer, Conductor
- Years active: 2002–present
- Labels: Signum Classics
- Website: rodrigoruiz.com

Rodrigo Ruiz (born October 6, 1988) is a Mexican composer and conductor. His music, which draws on Romantic traditions and literary sources, has been performed internationally and released on the Signum Classics label.

== Career ==
Ruiz’s works have been performed by artists including Huw Watkins, Laura van der Heijden, Christopher Glynn, Grace Davidson, and Kerenza Peacock. His music is published by Universal Edition.

His 2024 album, Venus & Adonis, released on Signum Classics, presents a song cycle based on William Shakespeare's poem Venus and Adonis, and has been described as the first complete setting of the text in this form. The album received attention from critics in Spain, Germany, and the United Kingdom.

His earlier album, Behold the Stars (2021), also on Signum Classics, reached the Billboard classical charts and received a four-star review from BBC Music Magazine.

Ruiz’s music has been broadcast on classical radio stations including BBC Radio 3's In Tune with Katie Derham, Opus 94 in Mexico, and RNZ Concert in New Zealand.

In 2025, Ruiz received the Prix spécial du Festival de Caylus for his Cello Suite, R. 11.

== Musical style ==
Ruiz’s compositional style has been described as rooted in tonal traditions, drawing influence from composers such as Brahms, Schubert, and Beethoven. Reviewers have noted the lyrical vocal writing and alignment of music and text in his vocal works, as well as his emphasis on proportion and expressive restraint.

== Discography ==
- Venus & Adonis (2024, Signum Classics)
- Behold the Stars (2021, Signum Classics)
- An Everlasting Dawn (2017)
