= Telesecundaria =

Mexican distance education program

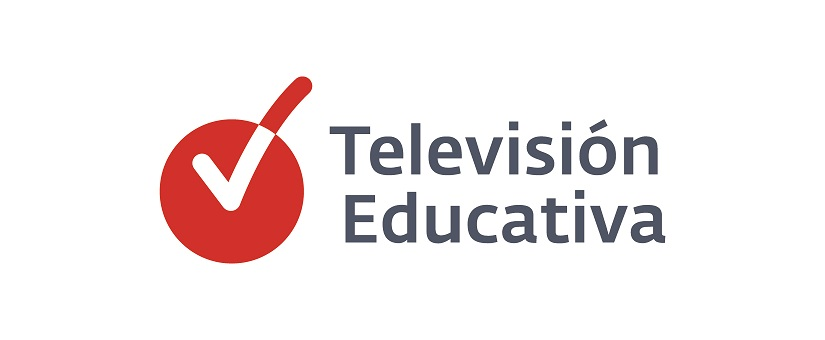

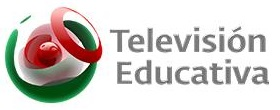
Televisión Educativa Logo Since 2019.

Telesecundaria is a system of distance education programs for secondary and high school students created by the government of Mexico. It is available in rural areas of the country as well as Central America, South America, Canada and the United States via satellite (Solidaridad 1 and Satmex 5).

== Background ==
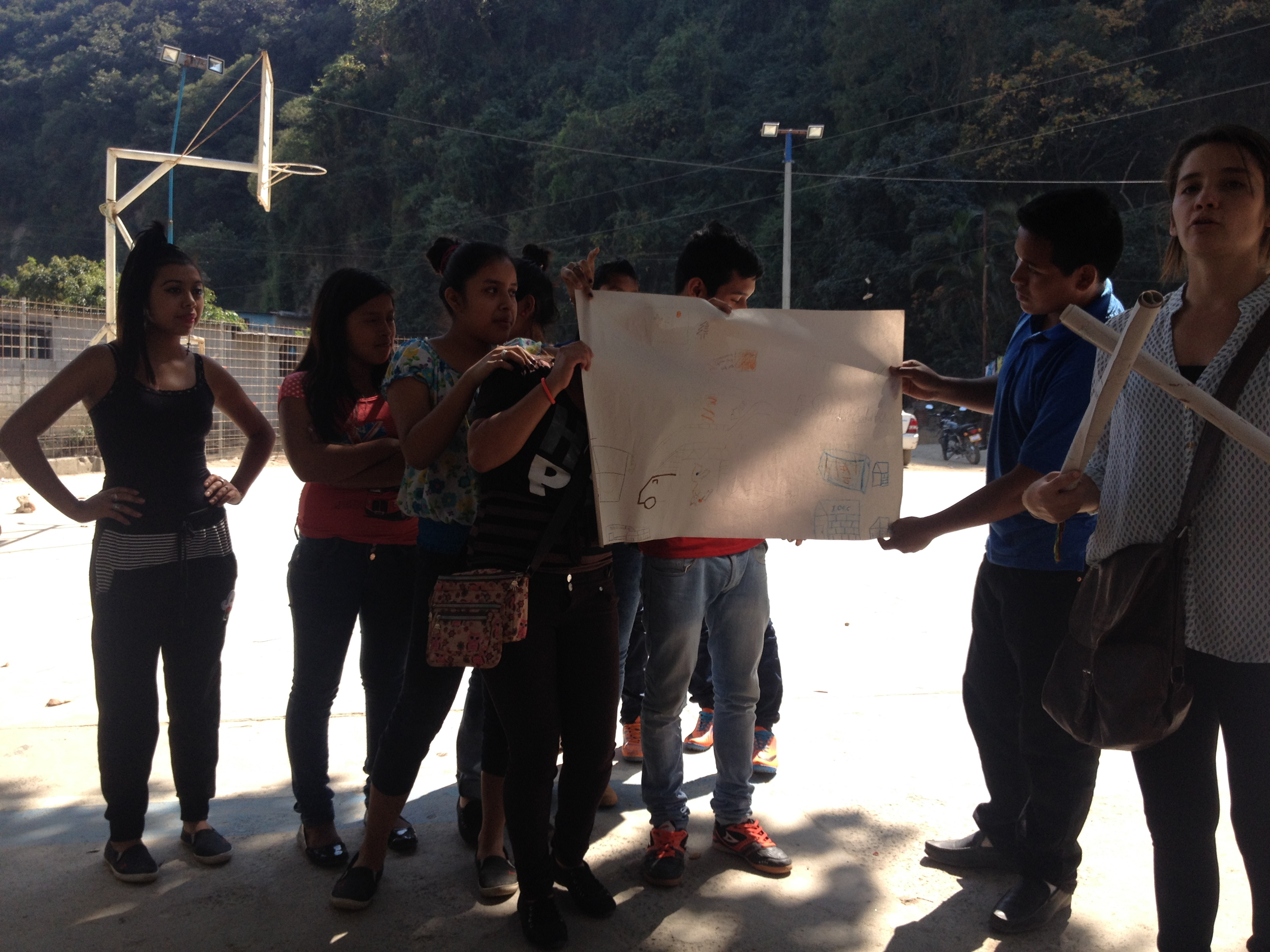
Telesecundaria students in Villa Nueva

Telesecundaria was born on the need to service graduates of elementary education in rural areas that were unable to continue their studies for lack of secondary schools in their areas. In 1968 Telesecundaria started at 304 classrooms and a teacher for each one of these in the states of Veracruz, Morelos, Estado de México, Puebla, Tlaxcala, Hidalgo, Oaxaca and the Federal District. The initial number of students was 6 549.

- Secundaria general – General studies
- Secundaria para trabajadores – for working students
- Secundaria tecnológica industrial – industrial technology
- Secundaria tecnológica agropecuaria – agricultural technology
- Secundaria tecnológica pesquera – fishing technology

Originally, Telesecundaria transmitted black-and-white live lessons through public television channels but nowadays the lessons have been pre-recorded to ensure higher quality, images are in color and transmitted via satellite. Content now includes education on values, good habits, skills and aptitudes. By the end of 1993, Telesecundaria was broadcasting to over 9,000 schools in Mexico, serving almost 600,000 students via satellite through Morelos II. In 1994, Edusat was launched, making use of the more powerful and advanced satellite, (Solidaridad 1) capable of transmitting 24 hours a day and covering more areas.

== Service ==
Each facility has at least one television set, a satellite dish, a set-top box and a low-noise amplifier.

Telesecundaria broadcasts more than 4,000 television programs on channel 11 of the six channels of Edusat (Sistema de Televisión Educativa, "Educational Television System") of the Ministry of Public Education (SEP, Secretaría de Educación Pública) of Mexico to more than 16,000 rural facilities serving more than one million students nationwide. The programs are transmitted daily between 8 a.m. and 2 p.m. (Mexico City time) and re-transmitted between 2 p.m. and 8 p.m. Monday through Friday. From 8 a.m. to 3 p.m. on Saturdays programs pertaining high school education are transmitted. Programming is complemented with general-interest, continuing education, and other shows about traditions and customs of the states of Mexico. For educators, audio visual content on each area of knowledge is provided for them, as well as the Experiencias Compartidas ("Shared Experiences") show.

== International expansion ==
=== Central America ===
In 1996, the head of the SEP and the ministers of Education of Central America agreed to start experimental projects of Telesecundarias for every country. Since this year, the following countries in Central America are served by Telesecundaria:

Country	Schools	Teachers	Students	Groups
Telesecundaria Costa Rica	50	117	2500	120
Telesecundaria El Salvador	96	166	5057	288
Telesecundaria Guatemala	384	786	20564	939
Telesecundaria Honduras	37	125	3118	111
Telesecundaria Panama	5	24	367	18

Source Ministry of Public Education of Mexico

=== United States ===
There are currently pilot programs available in the states of California, Colorado, Pennsylvania, Oregon and Florida.

== See also ==
- Education in Mexico
