= XHUAR-FM =

IMER radio station in Ciudad Juárez, Chihuahua

- Ciudad Juárez, Chihuahua; Mexico
- Broadcast area: Ciudad Juárez; El Paso, Texas, U.S.
- Frequency: 106.7 MHz (HD Radio)
- Branding: Órbita 106.7

Programming
- Format: Rock En Español/News
- Subchannels: HD2: HD2-Radio México Internacional, La Nueva 710; HD3: Interferencia

Ownership
- Owner: Instituto Mexicano de la Radio

History
- First air date: July 1, 1986
- Former call signs: XHCPDN-FM (2023)
- Call sign meaning: From "Juárez"

Technical information
- Licensing authority: CRT
- Class: C1
- ERP: 100,000 watts
- HAAT: 89.7 meters (294 ft)
- Transmitter coordinates: 31°42′22″N 106°29′54″W

Links
- Webcast: XHUAR-FM
- Website: http://www.imer.mx/orbita/

XHUAR-FM (106.7 FM) is a Rock En Español and News radio station licensed to Ciudad Juárez, Chihuahua, owned by IMER (Instituto Mexicano de la Radio), Mexico's public radio network. Like the public radio stations in the United States, IMER presents a variety of discussion and music programs.

XHUAR-FM broadcasts three channels in HD.

== History ==
XHUAR-FM signed on July 1, 1986, as "Estéreo Norte" with the remit of offering a Mexican alternative to the Americanized media of the area. By the early 1990s it was offering ballad music, which changed to rock in 1993. Meanwhile, speech programs diminished on XHUAR's broadcast day.

In 1996, the station adopted the Órbita name and format then in use on IMER's XHOF-FM in Mexico City. The station went 24 hours in 1999.

The concession for XHUAR-FM lapsed effective April 13, 2023, due to failure to file a timely renewal. The Federal Telecommunications Institute granted a new concession, which initially bore the template call sign XHCPDN-FM, which was changed back to XHUAR-FM along with those for five other stations whose concessions had lapsed and were reawarded.
