= XEDTL-AM =

Radio station in Mexico City

- Mexico City; Mexico
- Broadcast area: Greater Mexico City
- Frequencies: 660 kHz; 107.9 FM HD2 (XHIMR-FM)
- Branding: Tropicalísima

Programming
- Format: Tropical music

Ownership
- Owner: Instituto Mexicano de la Radio

History
- First air date: 1936
- Former call signs: XEBZ-AM (1936–1956); XERPM-AM (1956–1987); XERIN-AM (1987–1992)

Technical information
- Licensing authority: CRT
- Class: B
- Power: 50 kW day 1 kW night
- Transmitter coordinates: 19°18′33.9″N 99°03′33.3″W

Links
- Webcast: Listen live
- Website: https://www.imer.mx/tropicalisima/

XEDTL-AM is a radio station in the Mexican capital Mexico City. Broadcasting on 660 AM, XEDTL-AM is owned by the Instituto Mexicano de la Radio and broadcasts a tropical music format under the brand name Tropicalísima.

== History ==
=== AM station ===
XEDTL-AM began on 820 kHz as XEBZ-AM, with a concession awarded on July 9, 1936 to Sra. Refugio Esparza Vda. de Valezzi. It likely moved to 660 in 1939, when most Mexico City radio stations changed frequencies. It was sold in 1942 to Vocero Mexicano, S.A.

In 1956, the station changed its callsign to XERPM-AM (for its owner, Radio Programas de México) and was licensed for 50 kW day/10 kW night. It was the key station of the Cadena Radio Tricolor, also operated by RPM. The station passed into the ownership of Radio Fórmula in the 1970s, and in turn, Radio Fórmula's then-three stations (XERPM, XEMP-AM and XEB-AM) were nationalized in 1978. The callsign was changed yet again in 1987, to XERIN-AM, with power being lowered to 10 kW day/1 kW night. The station during this time was known as "Radio Rin", a children-oriented format that came to an end in 1991 with the callsign being changed to the current XEDTL-AM the next year. The station changed formats and names several times during this period.

In 2001, the station was given to Ricardo Rocha under a time brokerage agreement. Rocha ran the station under the Radio Fórmula banner, sparking debate on whether state property should be commercialized as such. In 2003, the contract was rescinded as Rocha could not pay to keep operating 660 AM, with the station broadcasting tropical music as "Candela 660 AM: Tropicalísima". This frequency became Radio Ciudadana in 2005.

On April 1, 2024, XEQK and XEDTL exchanged their formats, returning Radio Ciudadana to 1350 AM and Tropicalísima to 660 AM.

=== Format history ===
Radio Ciudadana 660 logo.

Radio Ciudadana got its start on XEQK-AM 1350 in 2003, displacing the Hora Exacta time service after 59 years. Two years later, it was moved to 660 AM, after which XEQK returned to the Hora Exacta format until 2008.
