= XHHCU-TDT =

Canal del Congreso TV station in Mexico City

- Mexico City; Mexico
- Channels: Digital: 18 (UHF); Virtual: 45
- Branding: Canal del Congreso

Programming
- Subchannels: 45.1: Canal del Congreso; 45.2: Canal del Congreso Senado; 45.3: Canal de Congreso Diputados

Ownership
- Owner: Congreso de la Unión

History
- Founded: March 31, 2010
- First air date: July 16, 2015
- Former channel numbers: Digital: 45 (UHF, 2015-2018)
- Call sign meaning: "Honorable Congreso de la Unión"

Technical information
- Licensing authority: CRT
- ERP: 179.140 kW
- HAAT: 369.5 m (1,212 ft)
- Transmitter coordinates: 19°32′06.59″N 99°07′47.83″W

Links
- Website: www.canaldelcongreso.gob.mx

XHHCU-TDT (channel 45) is a television station in Mexico City, Mexico. The station received its permit in 2010 and signed on July 16, 2015, as the first over-the-air outlet of the Canal del Congreso.

== History ==
As early as 1999, when the Canal del Congreso was being launched, Congress looked into the possibility of putting it on broadcast television.

Congress did not begin to build out the station until January 2012, when it signed a pact with Canal 22 under which Canal 22 would provide technical infrastructure and services to XHHCU. The arrangement would generate considerable cost savings. XHHCU-TDT's transmitter was located on the XEIMT-TV/TDT tower until 2018.

In early 2014, the station was still not on the air, though it began testing in April. The final delay, as of May 2014, was negotiations with the borough of Gustavo A. Madero to install a transmitter on Cerro del Chiquihuite. The Congress eventually planned to sign on additional broadcast transmitters to extend Canal del Congreso's over-the-air reach; however, the primary avenue of broadcast expansion has since been changed to SPR transmitters.

Ultimately, XHHCU, after years of planning, came to air with Canal del Congreso programming on July 16, 2015; the station formally launched on August 6, 2015.

In 2016, Congress received its own land parcel on Cerro del Chiquihuite which will allow it to stop renting space and equipment from Canal 22. The new transmitter facility and tower was dedicated on March 7, 2018. In June 2018, the IFT approved the frequency channel change of XHHCU-TDT to physical channel 18, which was carried out on September 7 of that year. The station kept its nationwide assigned virtual channel, 45.1.

== Subchannels ==
The station's digital channel is multiplexed:

Subchannels of XHHCU-TDT
Channel	Video	Short name	Programming
45.1	1080i	XHHCU	Canal del Congreso
45.2	480i	XHHCU	Canal del Congreso Senado
45.3	480i	XHHCU	Canal del Congreso Diputados
