= XHCAH-FM =

Radio station in Cacahoatán, Mexico

- Cacahoatán, Chiapas; Mexico
- Frequency: 89.1 FM (HD Radio)
- Branding: La Popular

Programming
- Format: Regional Mexican

Ownership
- Owner: Instituto Mexicano de la Radio

History
- First air date: September 16, 1987
- Former call signs: XHCPDL-FM (2023)
- Former frequencies: 1350 AM
- Call sign meaning: From "Cacahoatán"

Technical information
- Class: B1
- ERP: 25 kW
- HAAT: -82.2 m
- Transmitter coordinates: 14°59′58″N 92°9′48″W

Links
- Webcast: Listen live
- Website: imer.mx/lapopular

XHCAH-FM is a radio station in Cacahoatán, Chiapas, Mexico. Broadcasting on 89.1 FM, XHCAH-FM is owned by the Instituto Mexicano de la Radio and broadcasts a music and information format under the name "La Popular".

== History ==
XECAH-AM 1350 took to the air on September 16, 1987. The location of XECAH was strategic: it was intended as a Mexican alternative to the Guatemalan stations and the Belize-based repeater of Voice of America available in the area. Its format was music, principally local marimba, mixed with public service messages. Some of the information on XECAH was broadcast in the Mam language with the goal of reaching the small communities that could receive 1350 AM.

By the early 1990s, XECAH featured a wider variety of music, supplementing marimba with ranchera, pop, rock and boleros. It also featured informative programs such as En Confianza, for women, and Viva México, about Mexican and Chiapas customs and history, as well as the national SNN newscast from Mexico City. By 1994, the station broadcast 20 hours a day at 5 kW.

In 2005, XECAH was often the lone link to communities devastated by Hurricane Stan, offering emergency instructions, road and shelter information, and public health information.

The late 2000s saw the modernization of the station technically, while it moved toward a regional Mexican format including marimba. In 2012, XHCAH-FM 89.1 was signed on as part of the AM-FM migration campaign currently underway among Mexican radio stations.

The concession for XHCAH-FM lapsed effective April 13, 2023, due to failure to file a timely renewal. The Federal Telecommunications Institute granted a new concession, which initially bore the template call sign XHCPDL-FM, which was changed back to XHCAH-FM along with those for five other stations whose concessions were lapsed and reawarded.

== HD programming ==
XHCAH broadcasts in HD Radio:

- HD2 is a simulcast of XEB-AM.
- HD3 is a simulcast of XEQK-AM.
