= Erika Dobosiewicz =

Mexican violinist

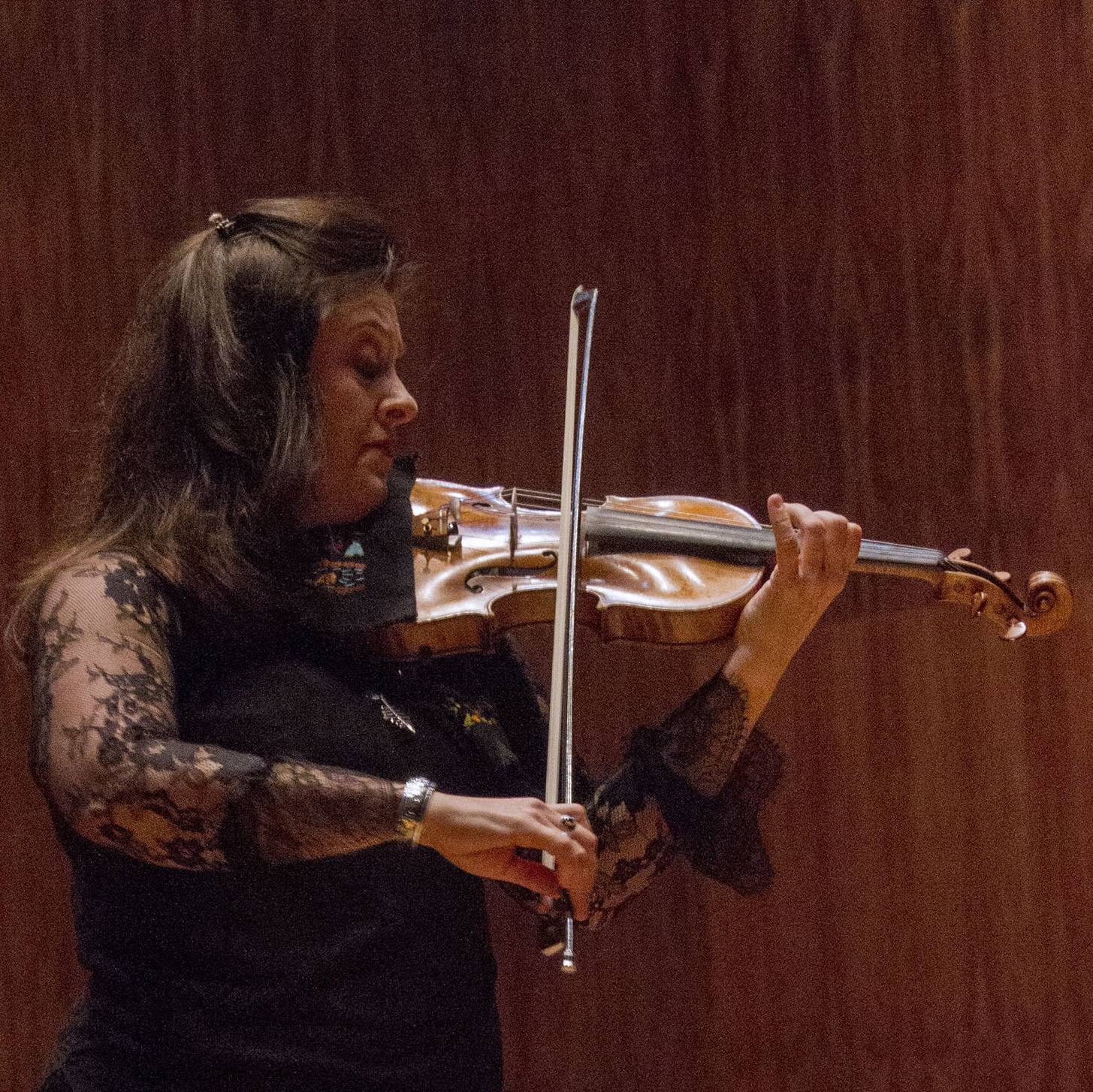
- in 2018
- Born: 5 November 1967; Warsaw
- Died: 29 or 30 March 2023; Mexico City
- Education: Polish Academy of Music in Warsaw and the Royal Conservatory of Ghent
- Occupation: violinist
- Children: two

Erika Dobosiewicz (November 5, 1967 – March 29 or 30, 2023) was a Polish born violinist who performed widely. She considered her home as Mexico. She won the International “Henryk Szeryng” Violin Competition in Mexico in 1992 and led the Theater Orchestra of Fine Arts as concertmaster.

== Life ==
Dobosiewicz was born in Warsaw in 1967. Her parents liked jazz and her mother sang. She studied at the Polish Academy of Music in Warsaw graduating with distinction in 1990. She then went to Belgium where she studied further at the Royal Conservatory of Ghent under the violinist and composer Mikhail Bezverkhny. She left there after she had won the First International “Henryk Szeryng” Violin Competition in Toluca in 1992. She was invited to Mexico by Luis Herrera de la Fuente to play at the Morelia International Music Festival.

She played as a soloist with leading Polish orchestras as well as the Berlin Radio Symphony Orchestra, Canada's Oshawa-Durham Symphony Orchestra and the Peruvian Trujillo Philharmonic and Peru's National Symphony Orchestra. She was a member and lead violinist in a string quartet called "Gemmeus".

She was the concertmaster of Mexico's National Symphony Orchestra from 2007 to 2009.

The musicians she has played with include Enrique Bátiz, Luis Herrera de la Fuente, Yehudi Menuhin, Krzysztof Penderecki, Carlos Miguel Prieto, Jorge Mester, the pianist Howard Shelley and Raúl Zambrano.

Dobosiewicz died in Mexico City in 2023 she was then the concertmaster of Mexico's Theater Orchestra of Fine Arts. It was the country she called home.

== Discography includes ==
- Manuel Ponce's Concerto for Violin and Orchestra played with the Querétaro Philharmonic
- Trocar, 4 Johann Sebastian Bach suites (2012), with Raúl Zambrano, Asaf Kolerstein and Alberto Cruzprieto.
