= Instituto Latinoamericano de la Comunicación Educativa =

"Instituto Latinoamericano de la Comunicación Educativa," (ILCE).
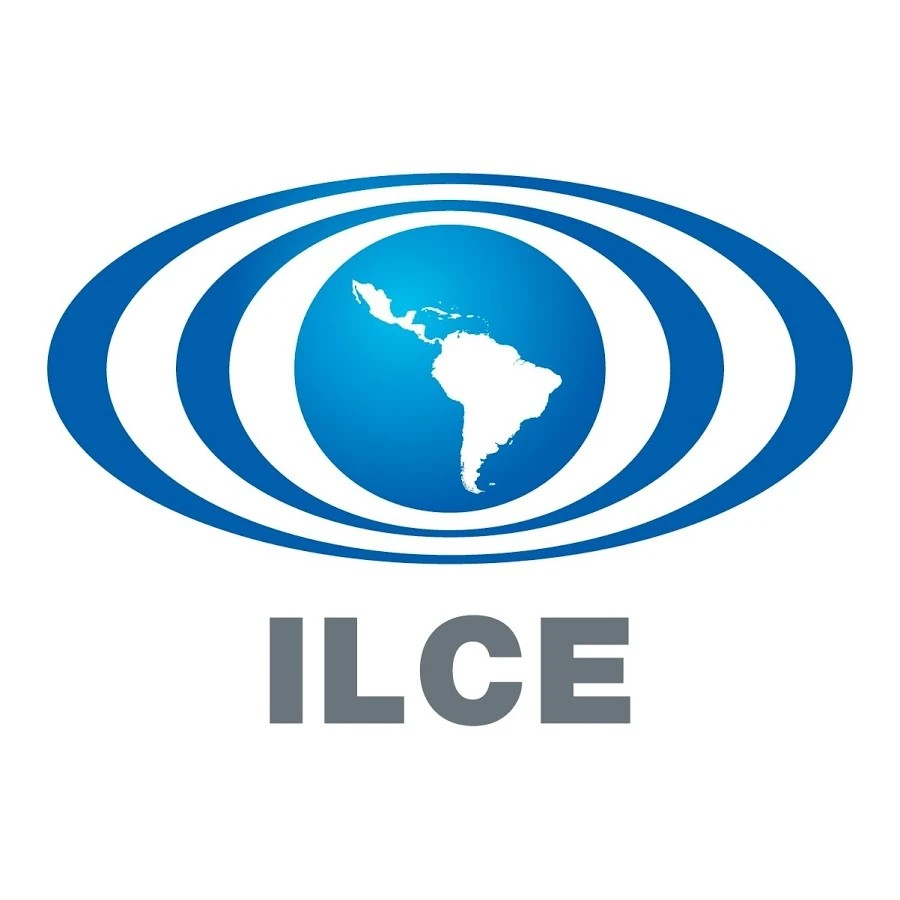

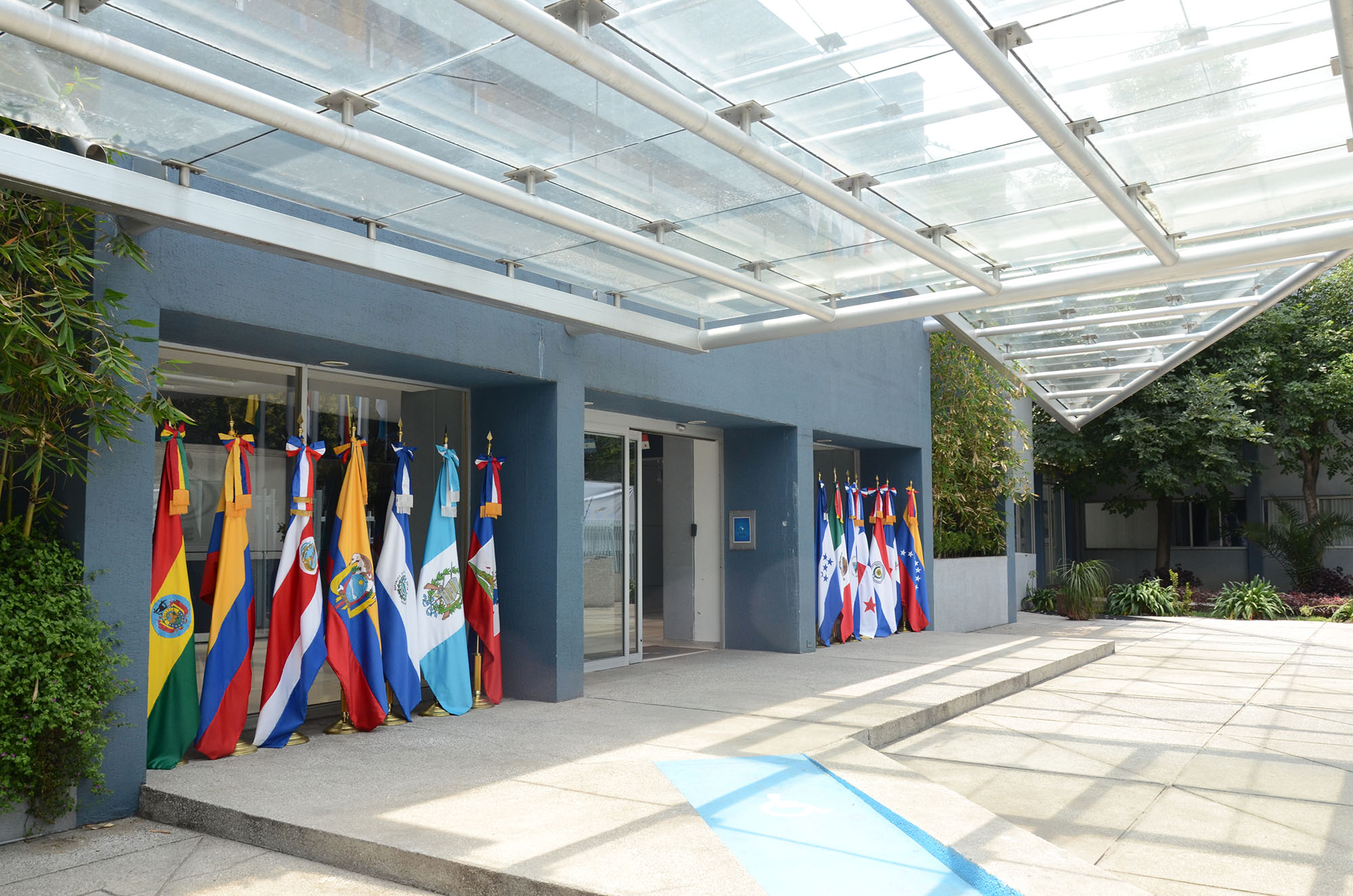
- ILCE Headquarters
- Abbreviation: ILCE
- Formation: 1956; 70 years ago
- Headquarters: Mexico City, Mexico
- Members: 14 members: Bolivia; Colombia; Costa Rica; Ecuador; El Salvador; Guatemala; Haiti; Honduras; Mexico; Nicaragua; Panama; Paraguay; Dominican Republic; Venezuela
- Director: Ismael Carvallo Robledo
- Website: www.ilce.edu.mx

"Instituto Latinoamericano de la Comunicación Educativa," (ILCE). (Latin American Institute of Educational Communication) operates two Edusat channels:

- 15 Summa Saberes (educational channel for students)
- 18 Canal Internationale (Ibero-American science and culture channel, was previously called "Canal Iberoamerica")

ILCE once also operated "Innova Conocimiento" on 13 and "Edusat Space" on 16.
