= XEUN-AM =

UNAM radio station in Mexico City

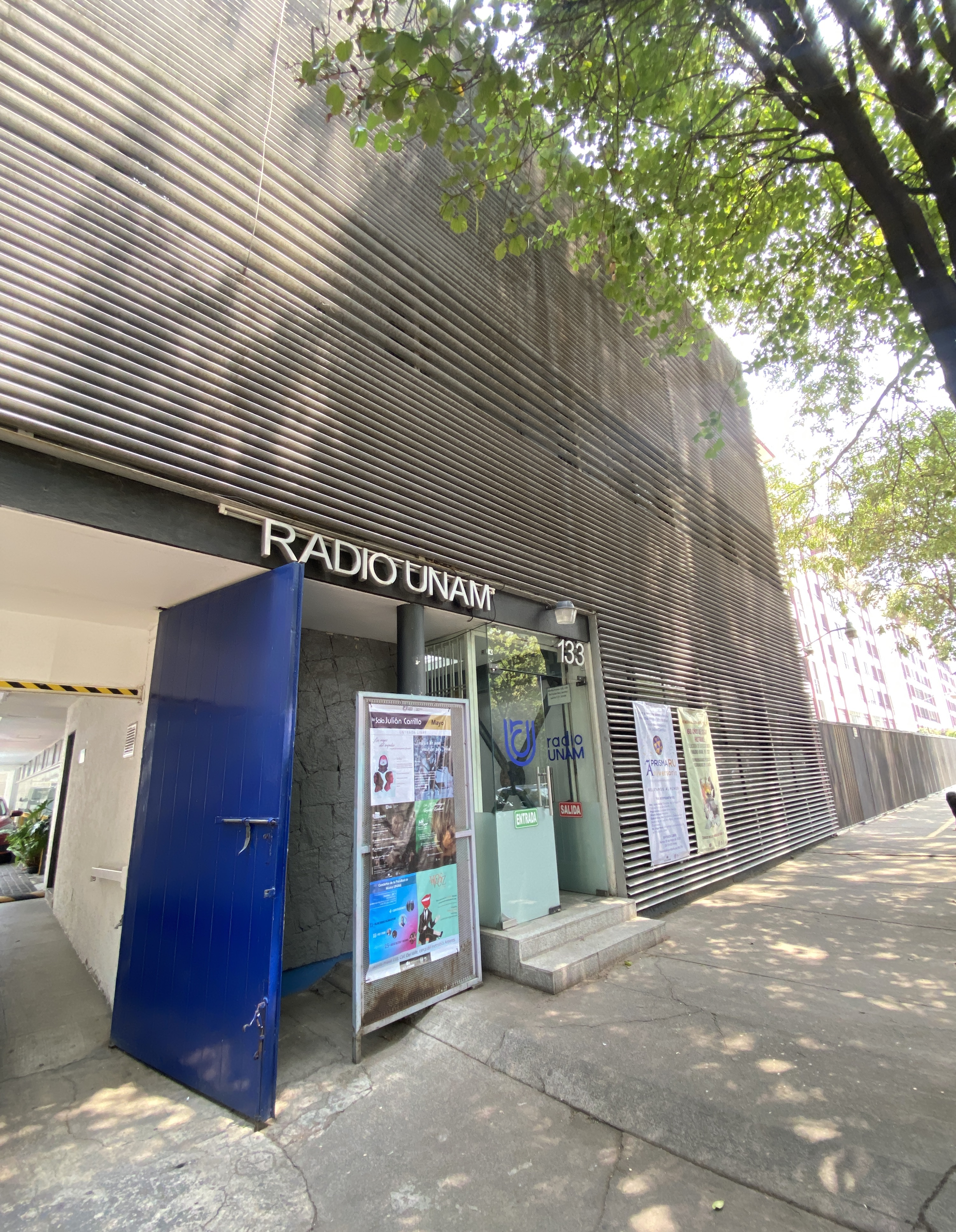
- Radio UNAM studios
- Mexico City; Mexico
- Broadcast area: Greater Mexico City
- Frequency: 860 kHz
- Branding: Radio UNAM

Programming
- Format: University cultural

Ownership
- Owner: National Autonomous University of Mexico
- Sister stations: XEUN-FM

History
- First air date: June 14, 1937
- Call sign meaning: First two letters of UNAM

Technical information
- Licensing authority: CRT
- Class: B
- Power: 45 kW day 10 kW night
- Transmitter coordinates: 19°31′53.1″N 99°09′02.4″W

Links
- Webcast: XEUN-AM
- Website: http://www.radiounam.unam.mx/

XEUN-AM is a radio station in Mexico City. Broadcasting on 860 AM, XEUN-AM is owned by the National Autonomous University of Mexico (UNAM) as a sister to XEUN-FM 96.1 and XHUNAM-TDT 20.

== History ==
On June 14, 1937, the Cultural Broadcasting Administration of UNAM was formed, and rector Luis Chico Goerne officially dedicated the facilities of the university's new radio station on Justo Sierra 16 in Mexico City. From 1937 to 1939, the station bore the calls XEXX and was located at 1170 kHz, broadcasting at 5 kW four hours a day; in 1939, the station moved to 860 kHz and took the XEUN calls. At the same time, UNAM shortwave radio signed on, as XEYU 9.6 MHz with 1,000 watts of power. With the new frequency came an expansion to seven hours a day, six days a week, with the station off the air for university holidays and on Sundays.

In 1956, XEUN and XEYU went off the air for five months to permit reconstruction of the AM and shortwave stations. When they returned in October, the new facilities expanded the coverage of what was then known as Radio Universidad to most of the country, while broadcasts now extended to 10 hours a day Monday-Saturday and 12 hours a day on Sundays; the next year, the station would expand its broadcast day again, to 12 hours a day seven days a week. The station's facilities moved in 1958 to the Technical Office Building on the UNAM campus.

XEUN-FM signed on July 16, 1959, from a transmitter located on the Torre Rectoría (Rectory Tower). In 1964, XEUN's transmitter moved again, this time to the Ticomán neighborhood, where power was increased to 45 kW day/25 kW night. This transmitter would be updated in 1994 with a model capable of broadcasting with 50 kW.

== Programming ==
XEUN-FM split from this station upon the FM transmitter's move to Ajusco in 1992. The division of programming across the two stations is specialized: 96.1 FM's broadcast day is composed of largely music programs, while 860 AM features predominantly speech programs.
