= Canal del Congreso =

Mexican congressional proceedings TV channel

- Country: Mexico
- Broadcast area: Mexico

Programming
- Language: Spanish

Ownership
- Owner: Congress of the Union

History
- Launched: 18 March 1998

Links
- Website: www.canaldelcongreso.gob.mx

Availability

Terrestrial
- XHHCU-TDT: 45.1 (Mexico City)
- Some SPR transmitters: 45.1

The Canal de Televisión del Congreso de los Estados Unidos Mexicanos (Television Channel of the Congress of the United Mexican States), shortened to Canal del Congreso (Congress Channel), is a television channel in Mexico that broadcasts the sessions of both houses of the Congress of the Union. It is available on all Mexican cable and satellite systems, as well as over-the-air in Mexico City on digital television station XHHCU-TDT channel 45.

Created in 1998 under the LVII Legislature of the Mexican Congress, the Canal del Congreso broadcasts its congressional programming as well as other politically oriented programs. It has studio facilities in both the Chamber of Deputies and the Senate, and it is governed by a bicameral commission (Spanish: Comisión Bicameral del Canal de Television del Congreso de la Unión).

In 2000, it began full-time transmissions on cable systems, expanding to satellite in 2001. At the beginning of the LVIII Legislature of the Mexican Congress, the Bicameral Commission worked to achieve a milestone for the channel: the Comisión Federal de Telecomunicaciones, then the television regulator in the country, required all cable systems to carry it. On March 10, 2010, Cofetel awarded it a concession to start XHHCU-TDT, a digital-only station broadcasting from Cerro del Chiquihuite, to carry the Canal del Congreso signal over the air in Mexico City. Channel 45 went on air on June 24, 2010.

In 2013, the channel's director general, Leticia Salas Torres, stated that she wishes to expand Canal del Congreso's over-the-air reach outside Mexico City. The first step in this process was Canal del Congreso's addition to ten transmitters of the Sistema Público de Radiodifusión del Estado Mexicano (SPR) in 2016. The SPR transmitters that carry Canal del Congreso use PSIP to display it on television receivers as channel 45.1.
