= XHEMIT-FM =

IMER radio station in Comitán de Domínguez, Chiapas, Mexico

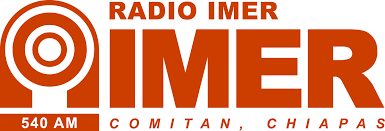
- Comitán, Chiapas; Mexico
- Frequency: 94.9 FM (HD Radio)
- Branding: Radio IMER

Programming
- Format: Public radio

Ownership
- Owner: Instituto Mexicano de la Radio

History
- First air date: 1988
- Former call signs: XHCPEO-FM (2023)
- Former frequencies: 540 kHz, 107.9 MHz
- Call sign meaning: From "Comitán"

Technical information
- ERP: 802 watts
- HAAT: 130.8 m
- Transmitter coordinates: 16°12′27.6″N 92°06′56.6″W

Links
- Webcast: Listen live
- Website: imer.mx

XHEMIT-FM 94.9 is a radio station in Comitán, Chiapas, Mexico. Broadcasting on 94.9 FM, XHEMIT-FM is owned by the Instituto Mexicano de la Radio and broadcasts a music and information format under the name "Radio IMER".

== History ==
XEMIT-AM 540 came on the air in 1988, one of three IMER stations that signed on under agreement with the Chiapas state government.

In 1994, the station added a news program, "Línea 54", in response to the confusion generated by the EZLN situation in Chiapas. At the time, the station broadcast with 700 W of power when it was authorized for 5 kW; it reached its maximum authorization with a new antenna and tower in 1995, significantly expanding its coverage.

In 2013, XHEMIT-FM 107.9 was signed on as part of the AM-FM migration campaign currently underway among Mexican radio stations. XHEMIT-FM broadcasts in HD Radio. XEMIT-AM had one of Mexico's largest continuity obligations requiring it to remain in service, for a total of nearly 120,000 otherwise unserved people in 680 unique localities as of 2018. However, the concession for XHEMIT-FM lapsed effective April 13, 2023, due to failure to file a timely renewal. The Federal Telecommunications Institute granted a new concession, but without the AM continuity obligation and on 94.9 MHz, outside the reserved band for community and indigenous stations. The new concession initially bore the template call sign XHCPEO-FM, which was changed back to XHEMIT-FM along with those for five other stations whose concessions were lapsed and reawarded.
