= Radio México Internacional =

Online and former shortwave radio station in Mexico

- Mexico City; Mexico
- Broadcast area: Worldwide

Programming
- Languages: Spanish, English, French, indigenous languages

Ownership
- Owner: Instituto Mexicano de la Radio

History
- First air date: 1 September 1969 (shortwave); January 1, 2011 (Internet radio)
- Last air date: 1 June 2004 (shortwave)
- Former call signs: XERMX-OC
- Former frequencies: 5.985, 9.705, 11.77, 15.43, 17.765 MHz
- Call sign meaning: Radio México

Technical information
- Class: International broadcasting (shortwave)
- Power: 10,000 watts (shortwave)

Links
- Webcast: Listen live
- Website: imer.mx

Radio México Internacional is a Mexican government-run radio service based in Mexico City. It broadcast as a shortwave radio station with the broadcast callsign XERMX-OC from 1969 to 2004, and was relaunched as an Internet-only radio service in 2011. Since 1983, it has been under the control of the Instituto Mexicano de la Radio (IMER). The -OC suffix is from onda corta, Spanish for "short wave".

== History ==
=== Early federal stations ===
Federal shortwave broadcasting in Mexico goes back to at least 1934, when the Secretariat of Foreign Affairs (SRE) started XECR. It was discontinued in 1937 when the government of Lázaro Cárdenas began shortwave station XEXA through the Autonomous Department of Press and Publicity (Spanish: Departamento Autónomo de Prensa y Publicidad, DAPP). XEXA continued into the 1940s.

=== XERMX ===
In 1968, Luis Echeverría, then Secretary of the Interior (Spanish: Secretaría de Gobernación), ordered Notimex to create a new shortwave station. The Secretariat of Communications and Transportation (SCT) allocated a set of five frequencies to be used at various times of the day: 5.985 MHz on the 49-meter band; 9.705 MHz on 31 meters; 11.77 MHz on 25 meters; 15.43 MHz on 19 meters; and 17.765 MHz on 16 meters.

XERMX-OC began broadcasting on 1 September 1969. It was taken over by the Instituto Mexicano de la Radio (IMER) in 1983, and ceased broadcasting on 1 June 2004. It had 10,000-watt transmitters.

In a November 2006 interview, IMER director Dolores Beistegui explained the logic for taking XERMX off the air:

Radio México Internacional was a shortwave project that operated with six transmitters, of which five (had broken down). Repairing them would have cost MXN$60 million...to reach who knows who, because no one listens to shortwave any more...we cancelled the project and gave the transmitters to Radio UNAM.

=== Internet audio ===
Radio México Internacional was relaunched by IMER as an Internet radio service on 1 January 2011, to provide programming in Spanish, English, French, and indigenous languages, with programs including music, dramas and documentaries.

It is aired as an HD Radio subchannel of XHOF-FM (105.7 HD2) in the Mexico City area and on two FM stations owned by the SPR, XHSPRM-FM 103.5 Mazatlán and XHSPRT-FM 101.1 Tapachula.
