= XHIMR-FM =

Radio station in Mexico City

- Mexico City; Mexico
- Broadcast area: Greater Mexico City
- Frequency: 107.9 MHz
- Branding: Horizonte 107.9

Programming
- Format: Jazz

Ownership
- Owner: Instituto Mexicano de la Radio

History
- First air date: February 15, 2000
- Call sign meaning: Instituto Mexicano de la Radio

Technical information
- Licensing authority: CRT
- Class: C1
- ERP: 30 kW
- HAAT: 12.1 meters (40 ft)
- Transmitter coordinates: 19°16′10.1″N 99°13′59.4″W

Links
- Webcast: XHIMR-FM
- Website: http://www.imer.mx/horizonte

XHIMR-FM is a radio station in Mexico City. Broadcasting on 107.9 FM from a tower in Ajusco, XHIMR is owned by the Instituto Mexicano de la Radio and broadcasts a jazz music format under the brand name Horizonte 107.9. The transmitter site is located in Ajusco south of the city.

== History ==
XHIMR-FM received its permit late in 1999; with a three-month deadline to come on air, it signed on February 15, 2000, as "Horizonte 108" utilizing content from other IMER stations, particularly XHOF-FM. The station's original programming included New Age and electronic music, which was eliminated early on, as well as informative programs in the lead-up to the 2000 presidential election. Gradually, the station shifted its broadcasting focus on jazz and world music in its programming.

In 2005, XHIMR boosted its power to 30 kW from its original 10, while dropping the "108" moniker (which had confused listeners). In 2010, it increased its jazz focus.

== Format ==
Horizonte 107.9 primarily broadcasts jazz music.

=== HD Programming ===
The station used to broadcast in HD Radio; this transmission was formally launched on September 17, 2012.

- HD2 is Radio Ciudadana (XEDTL-AM 660),
- HD3 is Musica del mundo. It has been silent since mid-2019.

But all digital signals became silent in early 2020 due to operating costs
