= XHUNAM-TDT =

TV station in Mexico City

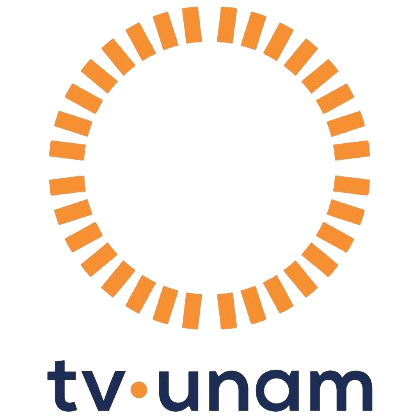
- Mexico City; Mexico
- Channels: Digital: 11 (VHF); Virtual: 20
- Branding: TV UNAM

Ownership
- Owner: National Autonomous University of Mexico

History
- Founded: 2000
- Former call signs: XHUNAM-TV (2000-2005)
- Former channel numbers: Analog: 60 (UHF, 2000-2005); Digital: 20 (UHF, 2005-2024)
- Call sign meaning: Universidad Nacional Autónoma de México

Technical information
- Licensing authority: CRT
- ERP: 170 kW
- HAAT: 342.2 m (1,123 ft)
- Transmitter coordinates: 19°19′01″N 99°10′30″W

Links
- Website: https://tv.unam.mx/

XHUNAM-TDT is a television station operating on channel 11 in Mexico City, owned by and broadcasting from the campus of the National Autonomous University of Mexico (UNAM).

== History ==
XHUNAM began broadcasts on analog channel 60 on December 5, 2000, where it broadcast for five years. On November 30, 2005, however, XHUNAM launched its digital signal, one of the first in the country and also one of the first digital-only stations in Mexico.

Although the National Autonomous University of Mexico (UNAM) operates the TV•unam network since 2005, the programming on XHUNAM was until 2024 completely different from said network; it consisted merely of old concerts conducted by Herbert von Karajan, looping all-day long, weekdays only, generally from 7:00 a.m. to 11:30 p.m. as a signal test. TV UNAM instead largely depended on SPR transmitters, including XHSPR-TDT in Mexico City, for broadcast coverage.

Initially broadcasting with an effective radiated power of 200 watts, XHUNAM generally covered only the greater UNAM area in Mexico City. A power increase to 1,500 watts was approved in 2017 and extends the signal reach beyond the immediate campus to other parts of western and southwestern Mexico City.

In October 2023, as part of its 18th anniversary, XHUNAM changed its frequency to 11 VHF (the same frequency used by XHTDMX-TDT between 2018 and 2023). The station began testing its new digital channel during February 2024.

On March 5, 2024, XHUNAM formally began broadcasting the TV•unam signal. XHSPR removed the 480i signal on the night of March 4.
