= XEMP-AM =

Radio station in Mexico City

- Mexico City; Mexico
- Broadcast area: Greater Mexico City
- Frequency: 710 kHz
- Branding: Radio 710

Programming
- Format: Regional Mexican

Ownership
- Owner: Instituto Mexicano de la Radio

History
- First air date: November 1, 1961

Technical information
- Licensing authority: CRT
- Class: B
- Power: 10 kW day 1 kW night
- Transmitter coordinates: 19°18′33.9″N 99°03′33.3″W

Links
- Webcast: XEMP-AM
- Website: https://www.imer.mx/radio710/

XEMP-AM is a radio station in the Mexican capital Mexico City. Broadcasting on 710 AM, XEMP-AM is owned by the Instituto Mexicano de la Radio and broadcasts a regional Mexican format under the name Radio 710.

== History ==
XEMP-AM signed on November 1, 1961, as "La charrita del cuadrante", a station devoted to ranchera music. It was originally owned by Mercedes Rivero Arredondo de Tuero. In 1965, Rivero solicited a shortwave counterpart, which would have broadcast on 11,740 kHz as XEMP-OC. On September 30, 1976, XEMP was transferred to Radio Visión Mexicana, S.A.

When IMER was incorporated in 1983, it became Opus 710, a culturally-oriented format; this migrated to the new XHIMER-FM 94.5 in June 1986. However, in September 1985 and in the aftermath of the earthquakes that hit Mexico City, XEMP became a news station known as Radio Información. This gave way to tropical music in 1990 and Mexican regional again in the 2000s, which in turn yielded to Spanish-language rock in 2008 as "Interferencia 7Diez".

The station returned to its roots as a regional Mexican music outlet on February 1, 2014.

Previous logo
