= XEQK-AM =

IMER radio station in Mexico City

- Mexico City; Mexico
- Broadcast area: Greater Mexico City
- Frequency: 1350 AM
- Branding: Luciérnagas 1350

Programming
- Format: Women's Community radio (feminist), talk and music

Ownership
- Owner: Instituto Mexicano de la Radio

History
- First air date: 1938

Technical information
- Licensing authority: CRT
- Class: B
- Power: 2.5 kW day 1 kW night
- Transmitter coordinates: 19°18′54.7″N 99°04′49.4″W

Links
- Webcast: Listen live
- Website: imer.mx/luciernagas1350/

XEQK-AM is a radio station in Mexico City, Mexico. Broadcasting on 1350 AM, XEQK-AM is owned by the Instituto Mexicano de la Radio and broadcasts a Women's Community radio (feminist), talk and music format under the brand name Luciérnagas 1350.

== History ==
=== Origins ===
The concession for XEQK was obtained in 1938 by Ángel H. Ferreira, and the station signed on the next year on 1500 kHz, operating 13 hours a day. In its early days, XEQK offered a wide variety of programs: news reports from the El Nacional and La Prensa newspapers, radio plays, live musical programming and radio magazines. Medical advertisers were common during this time as well.

=== "La Hora Exacta" ===
Not long after signing on, in 1940, the station hit tough economic times. Ferreira found a way to make the station workable: transmit the time every minute on the minute, interspersed with commercial announcements, from 8am to noon each day. The exact time came from the National Astronomical Observatory, then located in Tacubaya. In an era without digital clocks and only limited telephone services, the format was a success for the station and made significantly more money.

Two years later, XEQK removed all its other programs, moved to its current 1350 AM position and became known as "XEQK, la estación de la hora exacta" (XEQK, the exact time station). It also broadcast the nationalist campaign of president Manuel Ávila Camacho. In 1944, Ferreira sold XEQK to Guillermo Morales Blumenkron, who brought the station to 24-hour broadcasting. That same year, the exact time service was provided from the observatory to the station live, via telephone. Live announcers between the time signals included Jacobo Zabludovsky and Luis Ríos Castañeda, the "distinctive voice" of the station for years. "La QK", as it was popularly known, found a following in places such as hospitals, cars and businesses where exact time was paramount.

The station also pioneered first partial and then full automation, both spearheaded by engineer Gómez Bermúdez. In 1955, the semiautomated system debuted, consisting of eight-minute recordings on disc. The 1963 full automation system involved modules of 12-minute discs controlled by time signals from the observatory, which were sent several seconds before the minute. In 1982, public service messages were added alongside the commercials.

From 1973 to 1986, XEQK-AM was simulcast on 91.3 FM, which then had the callsign XEQK-FM (the station is now separately owned XHFAJ-FM).

In 1984, XEQK, then owned by Hora Exacta, S.A. was sold to the Instituto Mexicano de la Radio; IMER bought shares in Hora Exacta, which ceded the concession. From 1984 to 1990, the station aired no commercial advertising, instead broadcasting public service and social messages. When commercials returned in 1990, they were slotted alongside the service messages, which now included telephone numbers for emergency services. In August 1990, XEQK increased its power to 1 kW day and night. In 1998, Spanish pop music was added to the format.

=== Format experimentation and change ===
In 2003, after 59 years of broadcasting the exact time, XEQK's format was completely changed and made way for a new radio project, Radio Ciudadana ("Citizen Radio"). Two years later, however, that format was moved to XEDTL-AM 660, with 1350 returning to its time format. From August 15, 2005, to 2008, the exact time was sent to the station via modem and now from the National Metrology Center (CENAM). In 2008, the tropical music format was added to the station.

In 2012, a new Hora Exacta service was created for broadcast on XHIMR-HD3, known as "La Nueva Hora Exacta". This service was replaced in 2014 with a subchannel featuring world music.

On April 1, 2024, XEQK and XEDTL exchanged their formats, returning Radio Ciudadana to 1350 AM and Tropicalísima to 660 AM.
