= XHIMER-FM =

Classical radio station in Mexico City

- Mexico City; Mexico
- Frequency: 94.5 MHz
- Branding: Opus 94

Programming
- Format: Classical music

Ownership
- Owner: Instituto Mexicano de la Radio

History
- First air date: July 4, 1986 (40 years ago)
- Former call signs: XHCPDO-FM (2023)

Technical information
- Licensing authority: CRT
- Class: C1
- ERP: 100 kW
- HAAT: 12.1 meters (40 ft)
- Transmitter coordinates: 19°16′10.1″N 99°13′59.4″W

Links
- Webcast: Listen live
- Website: imer.mx/opus/

XHIMER-FM is a radio station in the Mexican capital Mexico City. The station is owned by the Instituto Mexicano de la Radio (IMER) and broadcasts a classical music format under the brand name Opus 94. The transmitter site is located in Ajusco south of the city.

== History ==
In the 1970s, the Instituto Politécnico Nacional ceded its rights to 94.5 FM to the Secretariat of Public Education so the SEP could move Radio Educación (XEEP-AM) to FM. However, the money was not available for the SEP to build the station, and so the proposal was stalled.

The Opus format began on 710 AM (XEMP) in 1983. That same year, 94.5 FM, the last full-power FM frequency available in Mexico City, was put up to attract noncommercial permits. Several groups — the IPN and IMER among them — jockeyed for the station, with IMER winning. Opus moved to the new 94.5 XHIMER-FM on July 4, 1986, when 50 kW transmissions commenced. The station received authorization for a power boost to 100 kW in 1991, but IMER was not able to install a transmitter capable of outputting 100 kW until 1999.

The concession for XHIMER-FM lapsed effective April 13, 2023, due to failure to file a timely renewal. The Federal Telecommunications Institute granted a new concession, which initially bore the template call sign XHCPDO-FM, which was changed back to XHIMER-FM along with those for five other stations whose concessions were lapsed and reawarded.

== Format ==
Opus 94 primarily broadcasts classical music. The station broadcasts concerts of the Mexico City Philharmonic Orchestra.

The station used to broadcast in HD Radio; this transmission was formally launched on September 17, 2012. Its HD2 signal was co-owned XEB-AM and its HD3 was Jazz Digital, all of which became silent in early-2020 due to operating costs.
