= Instituto Mexicano de la Radio =

Mexican public broadcaster

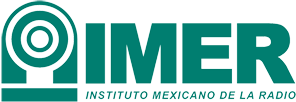
- Type: Public broadcasting radio network
- Country: Mexico
- Availability: National; available throughout Mexican states
- Headquarters: Mexico City, Mexico
- Owner: State governments
- Key people: Ana Cecilia Valdés Terrazas
- Launch date: March 23, 1983
- Official website: IMER official site

The Instituto Mexicano de la Radio (IMER; English: "Mexican Radio Institute") is a Mexican public broadcaster.

It was founded in 1983 as a companion to the public TV broadcaster Imevisión, since privatized and known as TV Azteca. When Imevisión was privatized, XEIMT-TV (Imevisión's cultural channel) and IMER remained under government control.

== Current stations ==
IMER stations
- Mexico City: XHIMER-FM, XHOF-FM, XHIMR-FM, XEDTL-AM, XEMP-AM, XEB-AM, XEQK-AM
- Tijuana, Baja California: XHUAN-FM
- Cananea, Sonora: XHFQ-FM
- Ciudad Acuña, Coahuila: XHRF-FM
- Ciudad Juárez, Chihuahua: XHUAR-FM
- Lázaro Cárdenas, Michoacán: XHLAC-FM
- Salina Cruz, Oaxaca: XHSCO-FM
- Comitán, Chiapas: XHEMIT-FM
- Cacahoatán, Chiapas: XHCAH-FM
- Chiapa de Corzo, Chiapas: XHCHZ-FM
- Mérida, Yucatán: XHYUC-FM
- Online: Radio México Internacional
