= LVIII Legislature of the Congress of Sonora =

The LVIII Legislature of the Congress of Sonora meets from September 2006 to September 2009. All members of the Congress were elected in the 2006 Sonora state election.

The LVIII Legislature consists of 14 deputies from the Institutional Revolutionary Party (PRI), 13 deputies from the National Action Party (PAN), 3 deputies from the Party of the Democratic Revolution (PRD), 2 deputies form the New Alliance Party and 1 deputy form the Labor Party.

== Composition ==
Composition of the LVIII Legislature
District	Deputy	Party
I	Florencio Díaz Armenta	PAN
II	Sergio Cuéllar Yescas	PRI
III	Darío Murillo Bolaños	PAN
IV	Leticia Amparano Gámez	PAN
V	Irma Villalobos Rascón	PRI
VI	Luis Melecio Chavarín Gaxiola	PRI
VII	Francisco García Gámez	PAN
VIII	Enrique Pesqueira Pellat	PAN
IX	Héctor Sagasta Molina	PRI
X	Hermes Martín Biebrich Guevara	PRI
XI	José Víctor Martínez Olivarría	PRI
XII	Susana Saldaña Cavazos	PAN
XIII	Manuel Ignacio Acosta Gutiérrez	PRI
XIV	Claudia Pavlovich	PRI
XV	José Luis Marcos León Perea	PRI
XVI	Rogelio Díaz Brown	PRI
XVII	Juan Leyva Mendivil	PRI
XVIII	Ventura Félix Armenta	PANAL
IXX	Guillermo Peña Enríquez	PRI
XX	Zacarias Neyoy Yocupicio	PAN
XXI	Prospero Manuel Ibarra Otero	PRI
PR	Mónico Castillo Rodríguez	PT
PR	José Salomé Tello Magos	PANAL
PR	Carlos Daniel Fernández Guevara	PRI
PR	Jesús Fernando Morales Flores	PAN
PR	Juan Manuel Sauceda Morales	PRD
PR	Petra Santos Ortiz	PRD
PR	Reynaldo Millán Cota	PRD
PR	Emmanuel López Medrano	PAN
PR	Carlos Amaya Rivera	PAN
PR	Irma Romo Salazar	PAN
PR	Óscar René Tellez Leyva	PAN
PR	Edmundo García Pavlovich	PAN

Preceded by LVII Legislature	LVIII Legislature; September 2006 to August 2009	Succeeded by LIX Legislature
