= LIX Legislature of the Congress of Sonora =

The LIX Legislature of the Congress of Sonora met from September 2009 to September 2012. All members of the Congress were elected in the 2009 Sonora state election.

The LIX Legislature consists of 14 deputies from the National Action Party (PAN), 12 deputies from the Institutional Revolutionary Party (PRI), 2 deputies from the Party of the Democratic Revolution (PRD), 2 deputies form the Ecologist Green Party of Mexico (PVEM) and 3 deputy form the New Alliance Party.

== Composition ==
=== By relative majority ===
Name	Party
Leslie Pantoja Hernández	PAN
Gerardo Figueroa Zazueta	PRI
Jesús Alberto López Quiroz	PAN
David Galindo Delgado	PAN
Moisés Ignacio Casal Díaz	PAN
Daniel Córdova Bon	PANAL
María Montaño Maldonado	PAN
Ulises Cristópulos Ríos	PRI
Damián Zepeda Vidales	PAN
Carlos Heberto Rodríguez Freaner	PVEM
Vicente Javier Solís Granados	PRI
Flor Ayala	PRI
Otto Claussen Iberri	PRI
Héctor Moisés Laguna Torres	PAN
Raúl Acosta Tapia	PRI
Sara Martínez de Teresa	PAN
Eloísa Flores García	PAN
Faustino Félix Chávez	PRI
Natanael Guerrero López	PRI
José Luis Germán Espinoza	PRI
Bulmaro Pacheco Moreno	PRI

=== Plurinominal Deputies ===
Name	Party
José Guadalupe Curiel	PRD
Marco Antonio Ramírez Wakamatzu	PRI
Roberto Ruibal Astiazarán	PRI
Alejandra López Noriega	PAN
David Galván Cázares	PAN
Reginaldo Duarte Íñigo	PAN
Félix Rafael Silva López	PAN
José Enrique Reina Lizárraga	PAN
Jorge Antonio Valdez Villanueva	PANAL
Gorgonia Rosas López	PRD
César Augusto Marcor Ramírez	PVEM
Óscar Manuel Madero Valencia	PANAL

Preceded by LVIII Legislature	LVIII Legislature; September 2009 to August 2012	Succeeded by LX Legislature
