= Faustino Félix Chávez =

Mexican politician

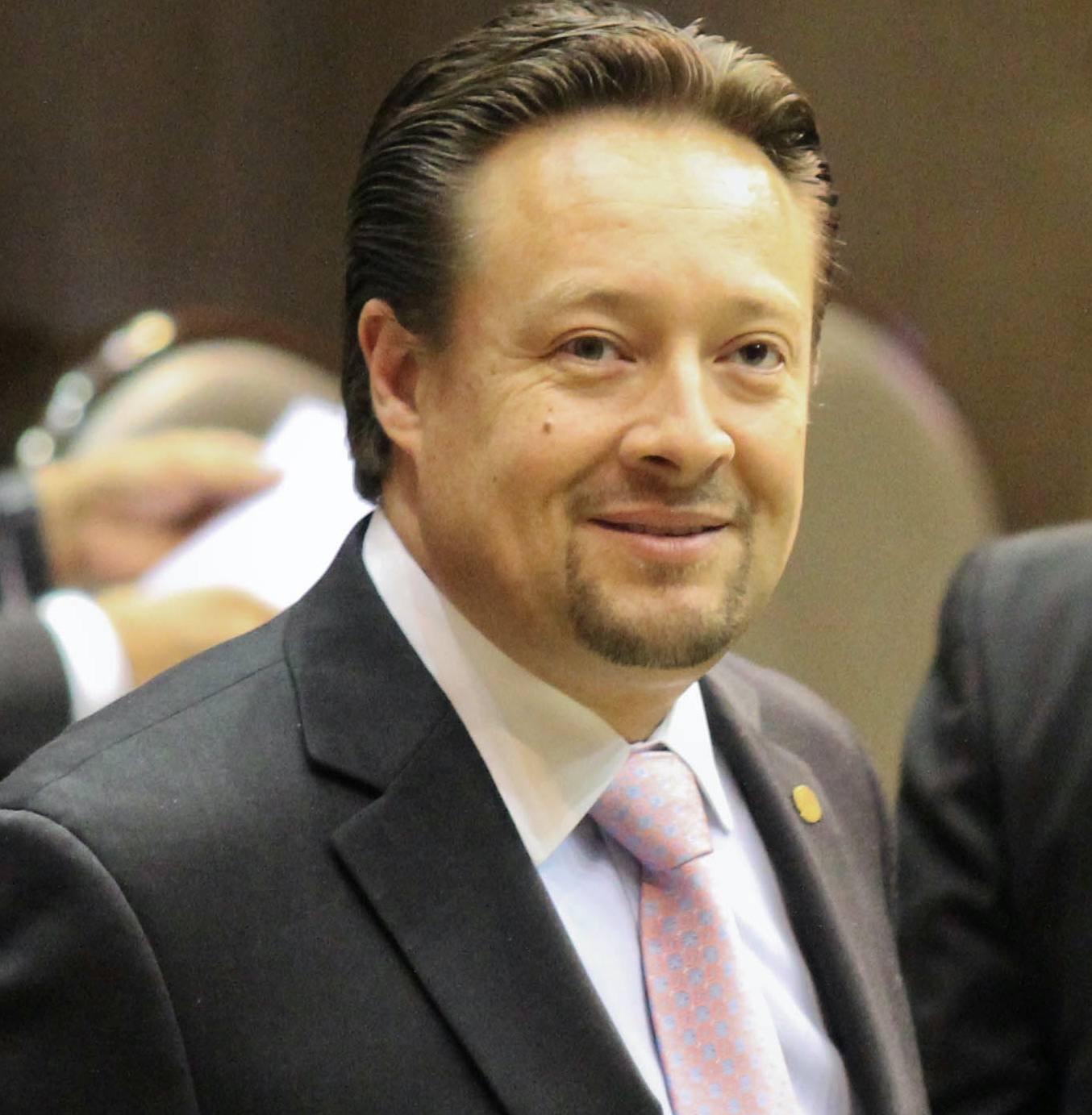
- Faustino Félix Chávez was a Mexican politician.

Municipal president of Cajeme
- In office 16 September 2015 – 15 September 2018
- Preceded by: Rogelio Díaz Brown
- Succeeded by: Sergio Pablo Mariscal Alvarado

Member of the Chamber of Deputies for Sonora's 6th district
- In office 29 August 2012 – 31 August 2015
- Preceded by: Rogelio Díaz Brown
- Succeeded by: Abel Murrieta Gutiérrez

Member of the Congress of Sonora from the 13th district
- In office 2009–2012
- Preceded by: Manuel Ignacio Acosta Gutiérrez
- Succeeded by: Jose Luis León Perea

Personal details
- Born: 21 October 1967 (age 58) Sonora, Mexico
- Party: PRI

Faustino Francisco Félix Chávez (born 21 October 1967) is a Mexican politician affiliated with the Institutional Revolutionary Party (PRI). He served as a federal deputy in the 62nd Congress, representing Sonora's sixth district. He was elected municipal president of Cajeme in 2015.

== See also ==
- List of municipal presidents of Cajeme
