= Abel Murrieta Gutiérrez =

Mexican lawyer and politician (1963–2021)

Member of the Chamber of Deputies for Sonora's 6th district
- In office 29 August 2015 – 31 August 2018
- Preceded by: Faustino Félix Chávez
- Succeeded by: Carlos Javier Lamarque Cano

Member of the Congress of Sonora from the 16th district
- In office 2012–2015
- Preceded by: Sara Martínez de Teresa
- Succeeded by: Omar Alberto Guillen Partida

Attorney General of Sonora
- In office 2004–2012
- Preceded by: Rubén Díaz Vega
- Succeeded by: Carlos Alberto Navarro Sugich

Personal details
- Born: 1 May 1963 Ciudad Obregón, Sonora, Mexico
- Died: 13 May 2021 (aged 58) Ciudad Obregón, Sonora, Mexico
- Cause of death: Assassination
- Party: PRI
- Education: Autonomous University of Nuevo León

Francisco Abel Murrieta Gutiérrez (Spanish pronunciation: [fɾanˈsisko aˈβel muˈɾjeta ɣuˈtjeres]; 1 May 1963 – 13 May 2021) was a Mexican lawyer and politician who was a member of the Institutional Revolutionary Party (PRI). He served as deputy during the 58th session of Congress from 2015 to 2018, representing Sonora's sixth district. Previously, he was a member of the Congress of Sonora and the attorney general of the same state.

== Career ==
Born in Ciudad Obregón, Sonora, Murrieta studied law at the Autonomous University of Nuevo León, from where he graduated in 1984. He provided legal counsel, as an independent corporate lawyer, to various businesses in Ciudad Obregón from 1986 to 1991. In addition, he worked at various universities in the state, teaching business law at the Sonora Institute of Technology from 1985 to 1990, commercial law at the Monterrey Institute of Technology and Higher Education's Ciudad Obregón campus from 1991 to 1992, and administrative law at the Universidad La Salle Noroeste from 1997 to 1998.

=== Sonora Attorney General ===
He joined the Sonora Attorney General's office in 1991, working in various capacities for them as well as for the municipality of Cajeme before being named state attorney general in 2004. When Guillermo Padrés Elías of the National Action Party (PAN) replaced outgoing governor Eduardo Bours in 2009, he fired the entire cabinet except for Murrieta. This was due to the fact that Eduardo Medina-Mora Icaza, the outgoing attorney general of Mexico, called him "honest and incorruptible". He held the position for eight years, resigning in January 2012 to run for another office.

==== Disappearance of Alfredo Jiménez Mota ====
In early 2007, a municipal police officer from Navojoa implicated a group of public officials, including Murrieta, in the 2005 disappearance of journalist Alfredo Jiménez Mota. He testified that a group consisting of state Attorney General Murrieta, former mayor of Hermosillo (and brother of then-governor) Ricardo Robinson-Bours Castelo, Navojoa police director Luis Octavio Gastélum Villegas, and two other high-ranking members of law enforcement conspired with Raúl Enríquez Parra, a powerful Sonoran drug trafficker, to murder the young journalist because he was preparing to expose the relationship between the Sonoran government and organized crime in an upcoming report. Jiménez had also previously reported on Enríquez Parra's alliance with the Beltrán-Leyva Cartel as well as the infamous Cuarto Pasajero case from only a few months before his disappearance, where Sonoran authorities captured four traffickers in Hermosillo, including Enríquez Parra's brother Daniel, only to suspiciously release the "fourth passenger" Daniel a few hours later after paying a fine of 150 pesos.

In 2008 another witness came forward; alleged cartel gunman Saúl García Gaxiola confessed to taking part in the kidnapping and murder while corroborating the fact that Murrieta and Bours were complicit in the crime. In a letter, he described Jiménez's last days, where Parra Enríquez tortured him into revealing his sources and told him that he would face no consequences for killing him on account of his relationship with Bours and Murrieta.

==== 2009 Hermosillo daycare center fire ====
Significant controversy arose regarding his handling of the daycare center fire in Hermosillo that killed 49 children in June 2009. Governor of Sonora Eduardo Bours admitted a few days afterwards that the daycare's owners had family ties to state government officials, state PRI party officials and First Lady Margarita Zavala. After initially stating that the result of an independent investigation found a faulty air conditioning system to blame, Murrieta went on a media campaign accusing the Mexican Social Security Institute (IMSS) of criminal negligence, stating that they had been aware of safety violations in the building ever since they had sent the daycare a letter in 2005 detailing their violations. In July he announced the arrest of two IMSS workers and seven state employees, telling reporters that he would resign if they could prove he was lying about the investigation. All seven state employees would be released on bail. All three co-owners of the establishment would be released on bond and then absolved of guilt. In addition, the only government official to serve any time was Delia Irene Botello Amante, the last government employee to visit the daycare before the fire, who was arrested in 2011 and released in 2014 on a technicality.

A year after the disaster the Supreme Court of Justice of the Nation ruled that although there were serious violations, no public official could be held legally responsible for the events that transpired. Soon thereafter a coalition of victims' parents formed the Movimiento Ciudadano por la Justicia 5 de Junio in their fight for justice. Among other demands for recently elected governor Guillermo Padrés Elías, they asked for Murrieta's removal from office due to perceived obstruction of justice. The initial public support he had when he entered office a year prior had dropped due to his refusal to dismiss Murrieta.

In September 2016 it came to light that the letter that Murrieta claimed was sent to the daycare center in 2005 had been falsified by state government officials in an attempt to divert attention and shift blame away from the government, since the fire had actually begun in an adjacent warehouse used by the state secretariat of finance to store documents. A hypothesis that was investigated was that the fire was intentionally started in the warehouse with the purpose of destroying potential evidence of excessive debts incurred by the Bours government. A federal judge ordered the Sonora Attorney General's office to launch an investigation into both Murrieta and Bours for document falsification as well as altering the scene of the crime.

The entire scandal has since become emblematic of the impunity, corruption and nepotism exhibited by public officials in the country.

==== Murder of Nepomuceno Moreno Nuñez ====
In November 2011, peace activist Nepomuceno Moreno Núñez was gunned down in broad daylight while driving in Hermosillo; he had risen to prominence after tirelessly speaking out against organized crime and corruption and directly blaming state police for working with criminal organizations in his son's kidnapping the year prior. At a press conference less than 24 hours after his death, Murrieta emphasized Moreno's criminal past while omitting the fact he was absolved of his charges, implying that the shooting was unrelated to his recent activism. The almost-immediate criminalization of the victim garnered significant criticism from both journalists and activists. Prominent poet and activist Javier Sicilia called on the governor to fire Murrieta, saying that Moreno had sought protection from the government after receiving multiple death threats and he had failed to take action.

=== Congress of Sonora ===
Following his resignation from the state attorney general's office, he registered as a candidate for the PRI nomination to the Congress of Sonora in 2012. He won a seat representing the 16th district of Ciudad Obregón southeast, and served his full term as a deputy of the LX Legislature from 2012 to 2015. He was a member of committees on audit/fiscal review, labor/public works, economic development/tourism, energy/environment, health, rules/legislative precedence, and water. In 2013 he fought for misallocated funds to be rightfully distributed to the Sonora Institute of Technology, a school he taught business law at from 1985 to 1990, noting that they had received less than half of its promised budget from the state government.

=== Chamber of Deputies ===
After his term in the state legislature, Murrieta won a seat as a deputy in the 58th Congress for Sonora's 6th district in 2015. It was a landslide, as he took 49.34% of the popular vote, nearly twice as much as his PAN rival Nidia Eloísa Rascón Ruiz who finished with 25.69%. During his three-year term he was a member of seven committees, including the public safety committee and the justice committee. In 2017 Murrieta announced his intention to run for municipal president of Cajeme in the following year's elections under the PRI banner. In February 2018, however, he resigned from the party and joined PAN after disagreements arose regarding the internal election of Emeterio Ochoa Bazúa as party candidate.

Murrieta continued his career in law after leaving office. He, along with former Baja California Attorney General Antonio Martínez Luna, represented the LeBarón family in their legal case dealing with the fallout of the LeBarón and Langford families massacre in northeastern Sonora that left nine people dead in November 2019.

== Assassination ==
Murrieta was shot and killed in Ciudad Obregón on 13 May 2021. He was standing on a street corner distributing flyers for his campaign for the municipal presidency (now under the Citizens' Movement banner) when a car approached and fired multiple shots, hitting him in the head. A female campaign worker was also injured. Murrieta was rushed to a local hospital, where he died of his injuries. In his final campaign video, which was released a few days later, he had denounced crime and impunity in the city while stating that he was not afraid. Governor Claudia Pavlovich Arellano condemned the killing and vowed to work with the state attorney general's office to find the perpetrators. 15 candidates from Murrieta's party in Sonora requested some type of protection following the attack.

On 9 August 2021, Omar Alejandro Sayula Torres, a.k.a. El Mou, was detained in Ciudad Obregón and was identified as a possible suspect in Murrieta's killing. The attack was attributed to the Caborca Cartel, the same group that had carried out the massacre on Murrieta's clients, the LeBarón family, in 2019. The Caborca Cartel had been in a bloody conflict with the Sinaloa Cartel for control of the region, leading to an increase in murders over the past several years. Murrieta was due to travel to Tijuana on the day after he was killed to meet with Adrián LeBarón about their legal case relating to the massacre.

In January 2022, a commemorative marble plaque was placed on the street where Murrieta was killed.
