= Ernesto de Lucas Hopkins =

Mexican politician

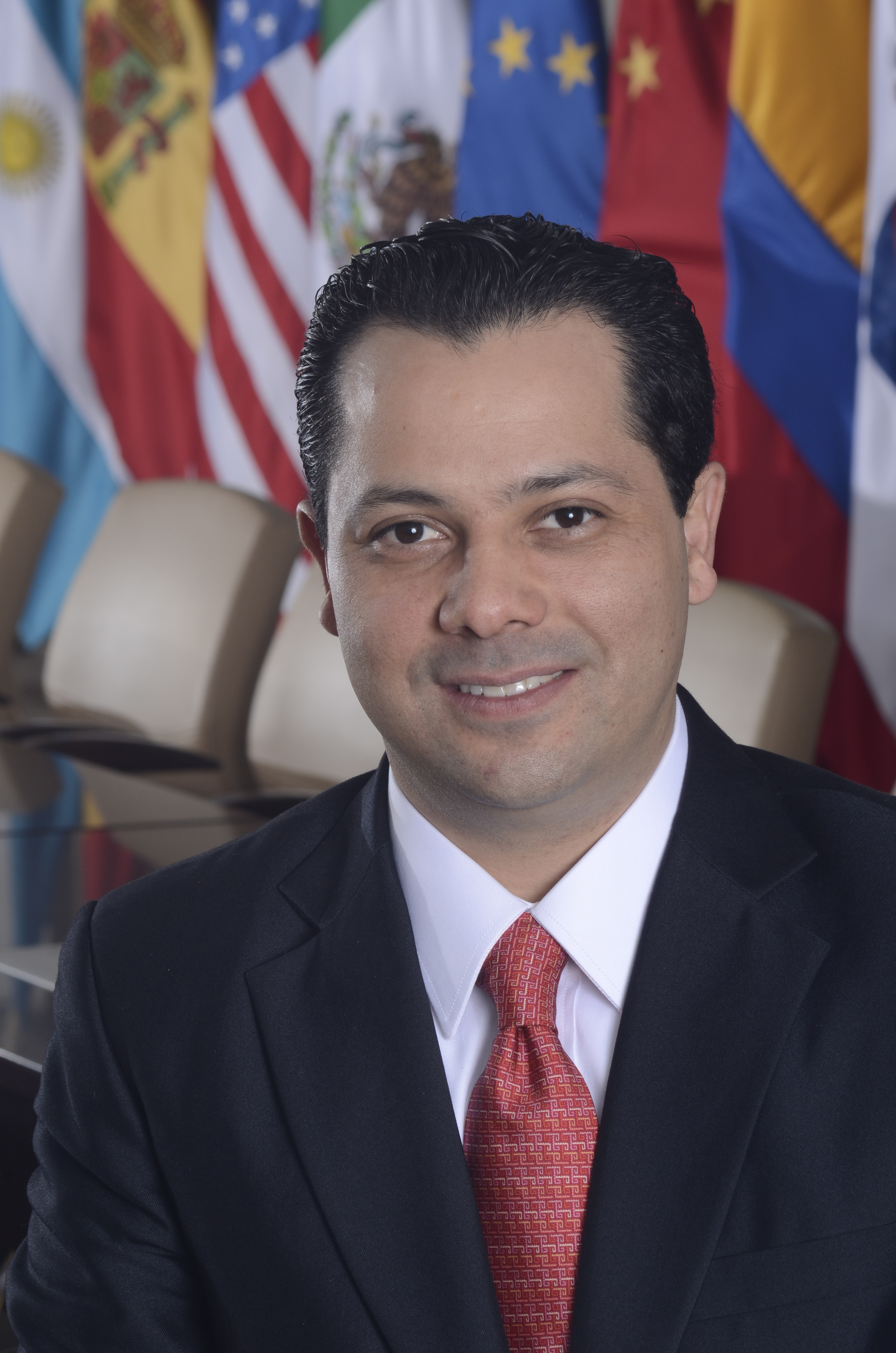

Member of the Congress of Sonora Plurinominal
- Incumbent
- Assumed office 1 September 2021

CEO of ProMéxico
- In office 10 December 2012 – 20 April 2013

Federal Deputy Chamber of Deputies (Mexico)
- In office 1 September 2009 – 31 August 2012

Personal details
- Born: 5 September 1976 (age 50) Magdalena de Kino, Sonora, Mexico
- Party: PRI
- Children: 3
- Education: Noroeste University

Ernesto "El Pato" de Lucas Hopkins (born 5 September 1976) is a Mexican politician affiliated with the Institutional Revolutionary Party (PRI). He was federal deputy during the LXI Legislature of the Mexican Congress under the principle of relative majority for the III Federal Electoral District of Sonora. On 10 December 2012 he was appointed CEO of ProMéxico, the Federal Government body that coordinates strategies to strengthen Mexico's participation in the international economy; supports the export process of companies established in Mexico and coordinates actions aimed at attracting foreign investment. On 20 April 2013 he was fired from this post, less than five months from taking over at this office, probably making him the first senior officer to be fired by President Enrique Peña Nieto.

== Education ==
He went to high school at the Monterrey Institute of Technology and Higher Education, Campus Sonora Norte. He obtained his bachelor's degree in law from the Universidad del Noroeste, earning honorable mention. Subsequently, he obtained a grant to study an LLM in Law and Government at the Washington College of Law, in Washington, DC, USA, specializing in Finance. He also holds a diploma in Mexican constitutional law and completed a High Specialization Program (AD-2) at the Instituto Panamericano de Alta Dirección de Empresas (IPADE).

Since 2012, he has been President of the Magdalena de Kino baseball team, Membrilleros de Magdalena, which was founded in 1942 and recently won the final series of the Liga Norte de México.

== Political career ==
In 2002, he was the personal secretary to the Senator of the Republic and candidate for Governor for the Institutional Revolutionary Party in Sonora, Eduardo Bours Castelo. During Governor Bours's administration (13 September 2003 – 12 September 2009), he was Director General of Government (2003). Subsequently, only 27 years old, he was State Coordinator and later Secretary of Public Safety in the state of Sonora, in 2006 and 2008, respectively. In 2008, when he has 29, he was unanimously elected President of the State Steering Committee of the Institutional Revolutionary Party in Sonora. At the same age, he was elected by the Secretaries of Public Safety of the states of California, Arizona, New Mexico, Texas, Baja California, Chihuahua, Coahuila, Tamaulipas and Nuevo León as Chairman of the US-Mexico Binational Council on Border Security of the Governors' Conference. He would later launch his campaign for the III Federal Electoral District of Sonora, to recover it for the PRI after 18 years of being represented by the National Action Party. On 11 February 2012, he was invited and presented by then presidential candidate for the Institutional Revolutionary Party and the Green Ecologist Party, Enrique Peña Nieto, and his General Campaign Coordinator, Luis Videgaray Caso, to coordinate the permanent nationwide campaign for the 2012 presidential elections in México. Similarly, on 4 September 2012 he was appointed Coordinator for Sports in the Transition process of President Elect of the United Mexican States, Enrique Peña Nieto. During the campaign for Federal Deputy for the III Federal Electoral District of Sonora, he became the first candidate to have his nickname, "El Pato", appear on electoral ballots during the 2009 Federal Elections in Mexico.

In 2021, he was designated by the PRI as its candidate to serve in the LXIII Legislature of the Congress of Sonora via proportional representation.

De Lucas Hopkins is seeking election as one of Sonora's senators in the 2024 Senate election, occupying the first place on the Citizens' Movement's two-name formula.

== Activism and compromise with Sonora ==
Childhood support and promotion of values: As part of his work as public servant, "El Pato" de Lucas has focused on promoting and transmitting the importance of values to children and young people in the state of Sonora. Some of the actions he has undertaken include management for rehabilitation of schools and public spaces, scholarships for low-income children, programs to create awareness on civil values and conducts, as well as campaigns to keep children and young people away from drugs.

Electricity tariffs: Another issue for "El Pato" de Lucas has been to demand that Mexican federal authorities review and make fair adjustments to electricity tariffs in the northern part of Mexico. He has done this through several legislative and citizens' actions.

== See also ==
- III Distrito Electoral Federal de Sonora
- ProMéxico
