= Homero Ríos Murrieta =

Mexican politician

- Born: 3 October 1974 (age 51); Hermosillo, Sonora, Mexico
- Occupation: Politician
- Political party: PAN

Homero Ríos Murrieta (born 3 October 1974) is a Mexican politician affiliated with the National Action Party (PAN). He served as a federal deputy in the 59th Congress, representing Sonora's third district. He had previously served as a local deputy in the 56th session of the Congress of Sonora.
