= Anabel Acosta Islas =

Mexican politician (born 1980)

Deputy of the Chamber of Deputies (Mexico)
- Incumbent
- Assumed office 2024
- Constituency: Sonora's 6th district

Senator of the Senate of the Republic (Mexico)
- In office 2012–2018
- Constituency: Sonora

Personal details
- Born: 9 August 1980 (age 45) Cajeme, Sonora, Mexico
- Party: Ecologist Green Party of Mexico (PVEM) (2024–present)
- Other political affiliations: Institutional Revolutionary Party (PRI) (until 2024); National Regeneration Movement (Morena) (until 2024)
- Education: Sonora Institute of Technology

Anabel Acosta Islas (born 9 August 1980) is a Mexican politician. A native of Cajeme, Sonora, and a graduate of the Sonora Institute of Technology, she has been elected to Congress for both the Institutional Revolutionary Party (PRI) and the National Regeneration Movement (Morena) but currently sits as a member of the Ecologist Green Party of Mexico (PVEM).

In the 2012 general election she was elected to the Senate for Sonora on the PRI ticket, where she served during the 62nd and 63rd sessions of Congress.

In the 2024 general election, voters in Sonora's sixth district (Ciudad Obregón) elected her to the Chamber of Deputies for the 66th session as a member of the Sigamos Haciendo Historia coalition comprising Morena and its allies, the PT and the PVEM. Originally elected as a member of Morena, she switched allegiance to the PVEM at the start of the legislative session.
