= Javier Castelo Parada =

Mexican politician

- Born: 26 October 1945 (age 80); Ciudad Obregón, Sonora, Mexico
- Occupations: Deputy and Senator
- Political party: PAN

Javier Castelo Parada (born 26 October 1945) is a Mexican politician affiliated with the National Action Party (PAN). He served as a senator in the 60th and 61st sessions of Congress, representing Sonora. He also served as federal deputy during the 59th session, representing Sonora's sixth district, and as a local deputy in the 53rd session of the Congress of Sonora.
