= Otto Claussen Iberri =

Mexican politician

Municipal president of Guaymas
- In office 16 September 2012 – 35 September 2015
- Preceded by: Mónica Marín Martínez
- Succeeded by: Lorenzo Décima

Member of the Congress of Sonora from the 13th district
- In office 16 September 2009 – 15 September 2012
- Preceded by: José Luis Marcos León Perea
- Succeeded by: José Luis Marcos León Perea

Personal details
- Born: 10 February 1964 (age 62) Guaymas, Sonora, Sonora, Mexico
- Party: PRI

Otto Claussen Iberri (born 10 February 1964) is a Mexican politician from the Institutional Revolutionary Party. From 2009 to 2012 he served as Deputy of the LIX Legislature of the Congress of Sonora. During his time as a mayor municipal president he managed to repair and paved over 300 boulevards and streets in Guaymas, Sonora. During his governance Guaymas was considered the second safest city in Mexico.

== Personal life ==
His father, Enrique Clausen Bustillos, also served as Mayor of Guaymas.
