= Alejandra López =

Alejandra López may refer to:

- Alejandra López Noriega (born 1970), Mexican politician
- María Alejandra López (born 1994), Colombian beauty queen
