= 2009 Hermosillo daycare center fire =

Fire in Mexico

Coordinates: 29°2′8.3″N 110°57′14.6″W

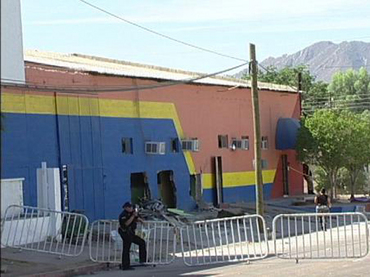
- The daycare after the fire
- Date: June 5, 2009
- Time: c. 2:45 p.m. (UTC−07:00)
- Venue: ABC Daycare center
- Location: Hermosillo, Sonora, Mexico
- Also known as: ABC daycare center fire
- Cause: Building fire
- Deaths: 49 toddlers and infants asphyxiated from smoke inhalation
- Injuries: 40+ children; 6 adults
- Verdict: Negligent homicide

The ABC Day Care Center Fire in Hermosillo, Sonora, Mexico, took place on Friday, June 5, 2009 and resulted in 49 deaths. Thirty five children died that day, with the death toll subsequently rising as additional children succumbed to their injuries. By June 7, 44 toddlers and infants were reported killed as a result of the blaze. Five additional children died in the coming weeks, raising the final death toll to 49. Additionally, 40 infants and toddlers and six adults were hospitalized with burns.

== Background ==
Governor Eduardo Bours announced that the daycare's owners had familial ties to state government officials, state PRI party officials and First Lady Margarita Zavala shortly after the fire. The daycare was federally funded but privately operated. The government's Social Security Institute provided a contract for operation. Two state officials, Antonio Salido Suárez and Alfonso Escalante Hoeffer, resigned in the aftermath of the incident but were not arrested. Their two wives co-owned the daycare center.

The daycare center had passed an inspection on May 26, the week prior to the blaze. The number of enrolled children, 142 as well as the 6 staff members providing care for them were also within the approved ratio of caregiver to children for day care centers. Reports two days after the blaze revealed, however, that although the warehouse had windows, they were mounted too high and did not provide access to the daycare center for rescue operations. A fire department officer unofficially reported that the converted warehouse building had only one operational exit. One mother claimed a second exit was locked and the key could not be found.

== Fire ==
The blaze started at 3 p.m. (22:00 GMT) on Friday, June 5, 2009, with over 142 children reported to be in the day care center. Initial reports stated the fire began in an adjacent tire warehouse next door and spread to the child care center. Further investigation revealed that the actual source was another warehouse, operated by the state government. Within minutes, the fire caused the collapse of a roof section which fell on the children, infants and employees below. One of the first responders on the scene reported that all children were unconscious or dead and there were no sounds of children crying.

Firefighters took two hours to contain the blaze. "They told me that this happened in a matter of five minutes," said Hermosillo Mayor Ernesto Gándara. "According to what our people saw, there was an explosion followed immediately by flames," reported Daniel Karam, the director of the Mexican Social Security Institute (IMSS). "We began to smell smoke and the alarm went off. But it was explosive and there was no chance to get more children out," stated María Adriana Gasca Sandoval, a daycare aide.

A desperate passerby, Francisco Manuel López Villaescusa, drove his Silverado truck through the walls to gain entrance and knocked three holes into the building.

== Victims ==
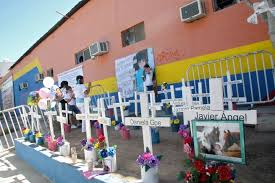
The daycare in 2015

According to Sonora Governor Eduardo Bours the day of the blaze, "There were 142 children in the nursery, 35 have died, and another 41 are hospitalized." Two days later on Sunday, Sonora state Health Minister Raymundo López Vucovich announced, "In the past few hours three more have died. Twelve of the 22 hospitalized children are in a dangerous condition." Deaths occurred from smoke inhalation, burns, and trauma from the roof collapse.

=== Subsequent hospital care ===
Many of the injured were cared for in hospitals in Guadalajara, Jalisco. Although 15 medical specialists were flown in to treat the victims, some children were moved to hospitals in other cities in the state of Jalisco which had doctors with specialties in children's burns. One boy could not be moved for further treatment as he has been declared brain dead. Two children were taken to a Shriner's burn hospital in Sacramento, California, USA, for treatment. "A lot of it is how deep the burn is and where it's located and how bad is the smoke inhalation," said Tina Palmieri, assistant chief of burns for the hospital. She reported that there was only a 50 per cent chance of survival for one of the three-year-old girls who sustained burns to over 80 percent of her body. This girl was accompanied by her father and arrived in California by Mexican military transport. Her mother, who had herself been working in the day care center, was taken to a Ciudad Obregón hospital after pulling her daughter and several other children out of the fire. The second patient, a young boy, began a series of skin graft surgeries on Sunday June 7, reported David Greenhalgh, chief of burn treatment at the Sacramento hospital. Both of these patients were listed in critical condition, monitored for infection, and unable to talk because breathing tubes had been inserted.

In the aftermath, Sonora state Health Minister Raymundo López Vucovich issued updates. He reported that some of the hospitalized children had been suffering from kidney failure due to severe loss of body fluids caused by the burns. Others in the hospital had respiratory symptoms from smoke inhalation. The burns on some of the victims were so bad authorities had problems identifying them. Javier Alexis Pacheco, aged two, was rushed to the hospital for treatment for burn injuries. There were communication mishaps. Four-year-old Hermán Vásquez, with burns on 75 percent of his body, was rushed to Chávez Hospital but his family did not find out where he was until 6 p.m. that evening.

== Investigation ==
President Felipe Calderón placed federal attorney general Eduardo Medina-Mora in charge of the investigation to ascertain the cause of the fire. The President visited the scene and was said to be "enormously saddened." "This has been a painful tragedy for all Mexicans. I have ordered the federal prosecutor to as soon as possible carry out investigations to help us know exactly what and how it happened, and to work out corresponding responsibility," said Calderón.

=== Into the fire and building ===
The investigation determined that the cause of fire was a malfunctioning of the air conditioning unit in the neighboring warehouse, which was not equipped with fire extinguishers or smoke alarms. "The fire was caused by the overheating of an air conditioner due to continuous and prolonged use," said Attorney-General Eduardo Medina Mora. The air conditioner melted its aluminum housing and spread to license plates and paper work in the state government warehouse, which was closed and empty when the fire started.

The investigation revealed that the child care center's fire alarms did not alert staff to the fire because they were installed below a brightly colored ceiling tarpaulin. It is believed that smoke filled the area between the warehouse's high roof and the false ceiling created by the tarp. When the tarp caught fire, smoke and flames collapsed onto the slumbering daycare infants and instantly filled the daycare with thick smoke.

Investigations further revealed that in 2005 the day care center owners had been advised by the IMSS to remove the tarp, widen the main entrance, and increase auxiliary fire exits to bring them up to fire regulation size. Subsequent safety inspections passed without the work being carried out and contracts were re-awarded for the continued operation of the center. Sonora attorney general Abel Murrieta Gutiérrez went on a media campaign accusing the IMSS of criminal negligence, stating that they had been aware of safety violations in the building ever since they had sent the warning letter in 2005.

The center was not equipped with water sprinklers which would have automatically engaged in the event of a fire. A marked emergency exit was bolted shut and one mother at the child care reported that no one was able to obtain the key. Hermosillo Fire Department Chief Martín Lugo reported that, although the facility had recently passed a safety inspection, the fire alarms for the building were not installed correctly. Parents stated that although the daycare had a staff of 20, only six were on duty on the Friday of the blaze. In addition, the center was set up for pre-school children aged two to four, but Governor Bours had reported that younger infants were being cared for in the center. "We always have to be open to improvements, especially when we have a tragedy that has so moved us," said IMSS director Kara, who admitted that their security requirements may need to be overhauled in light of the fact that the daycare passed safety inspection on May 26.

There were later suspicions that the warehouse fire was started intentionally.

=== Corruption ===
In September 2016, it came to light that the alleged letter sent to the daycare center in 2005 had been falsified by state officials in an attempt to divert attention from the government, since the fire had actually begun in an adjacent warehouse used by the state ministry of finance to store documents. A theory that was investigated was that the fire was intentionally started in the warehouse with the purpose of destroying potential evidence of excessive debts incurred by Eduardo Bours during his term as governor. A federal judge ordered the Sonora Attorney General's office to launch an investigation into both Bours and his former Attorney General Murrieta Gutiérrez for document falsification as well as altering the scene of the crime.

== Legal ==
=== Negligent homicide ===
Fourteen northern Sonora state finance department officials came under investigation and seven were arrested in connection with the fire for negligent homicide. "They are employees and officials with the Finance Department who have a direct responsibility for the warehouse where the fire started." Two IMSS workers were also among those arrested. All seven state employees would be released on bail, along with all three co-owners. The only person to serve any time was Delia Irene Botello Amante, an IMSS local coordinator who was the last government employee to visit to the daycare before the fire. She was arrested in 2011 and released on January 1, 2014 due to technical issues.

=== Negligence ===
The state Finance Department filed a negligence civil lawsuit against the day care owners and the Social Security Institute. The highest official in the Social Security Institute resigned and others were suspended. The IMSS sued Bours on May 22, 2019 for negligence in the investigation of the fire.

== Response ==
Pope Benedict XVI sent a telegram to Archbishop of Hermosillo José Ulises Macías Salcedo offering his condolences, "Together with spiritual closeness, concern, and wishes for a speedy and total recovery of those injured in the lamentable incident....With these sentiments, the Supreme Pontiff, in these moments of sadness, imparts from the heart the comfort of an apostolic blessing, as a sign of comfort and hope in the Risen Lord."

Mexican President Calderón stated, “I want to express in the name of the federal government, of all Mexicans and of me personally, our condolences to the mothers and fathers for this tragic accident.”

== Memorials ==
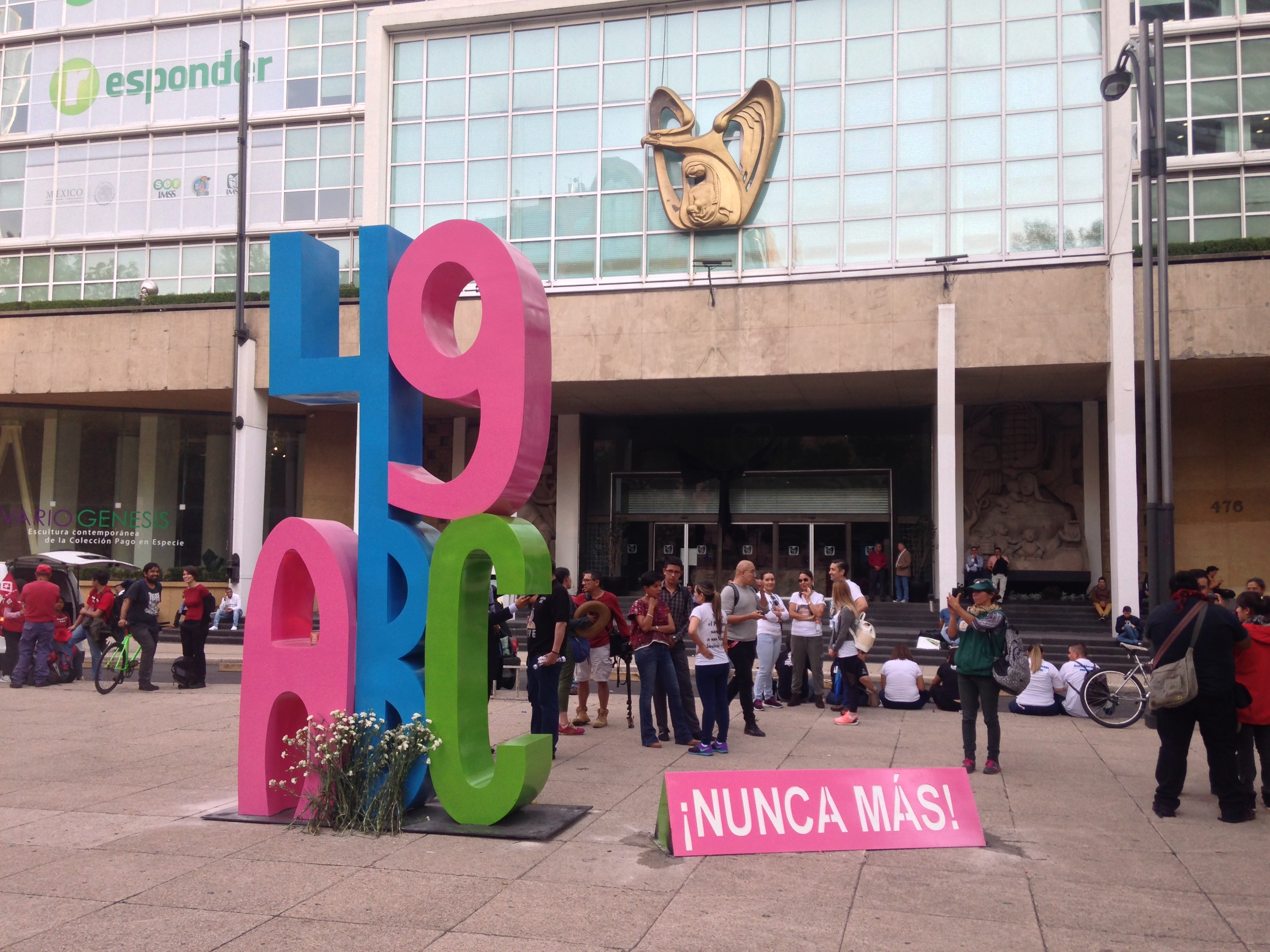
Antimonumento 49 ABC, dedicated to the victims, in front of Instituto Mexicano del Seguro Social central offices. It was installed on June 5, 2017 by victim's families.

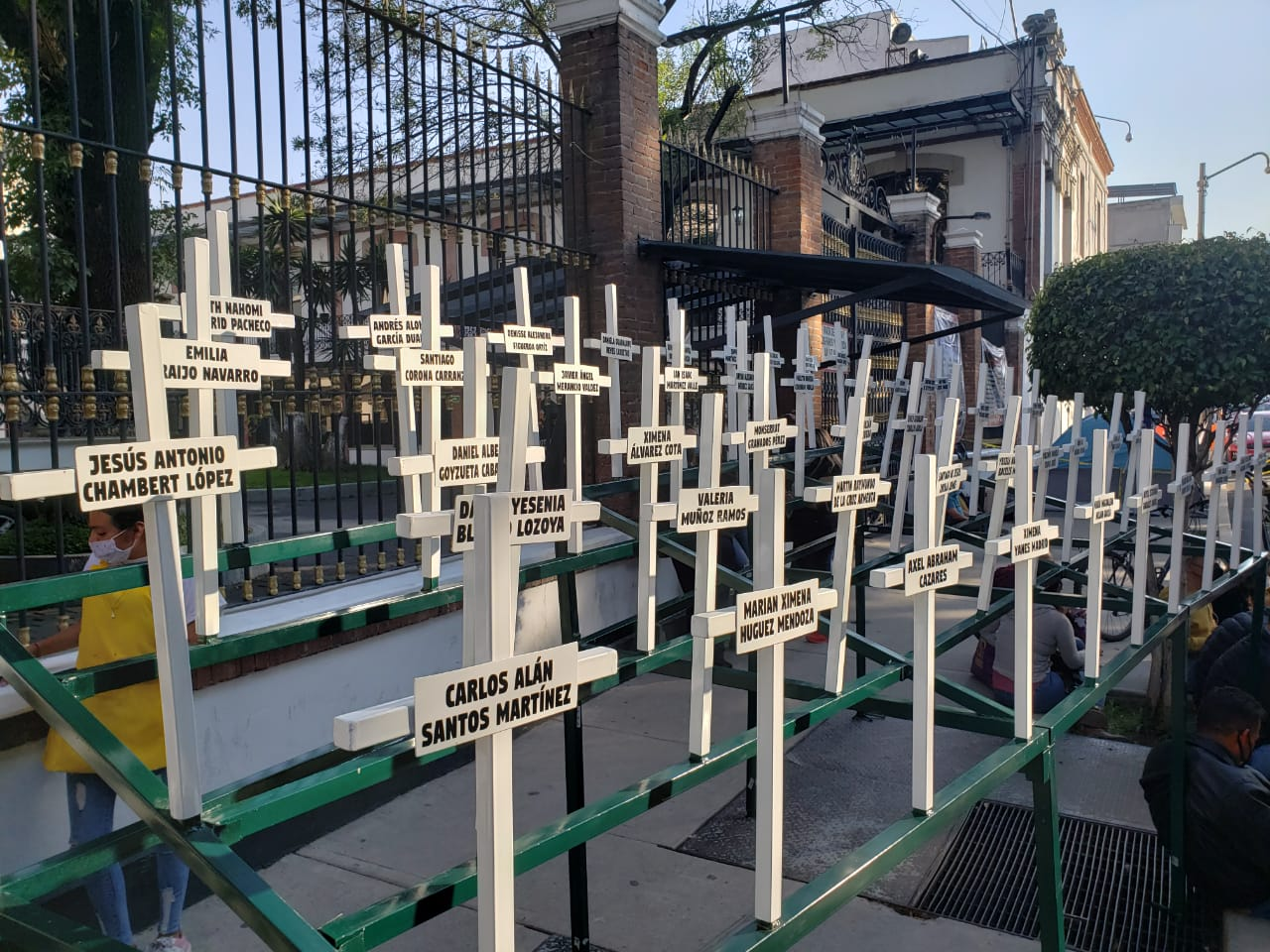
White crosses installed in front of the Secretariat of the Interior Building, in Mexico City

Neighbors conducted a candlelight vigil the morning of June 7 at the University of Sonora in Hermosillo. Stories of the victims appeared in news stories. Camila, a three-year-old girl perished in the fire from asphyxiation. María, Julio, Fátima, Carlos, Sofía and Dafne were among the 41 pre-schoolers who were mourned at several funeral ceremonies that took place on the Saturday following the blaze. The parents of two-year-old María Magdalena Millán, among those buried Saturday, attached a Dora the Explorer balloon to the cross marking her grave, while her mother cried out, "I love you and I don't want to leave you here!" Germán León battled his injuries, but died Saturday morning, just days after his fourth birthday. The family of 2-year-old Daniel Alberto Goyzueta Cabanillas, who died of smoke inhalation, held a funeral late Saturday afternoon for the boy. The family of 2-year-old Camila Fuentes Cervera also held her funeral Saturday.

== Depictions in media ==
In 2015, digital activist group ContingeneMX released a video partnered with many celebrities such as Rafael Amaya, that reenacted parent and witness testimony about the tragedy. The video ends with a call for people to join a march on June 5, 2015 in Mexico City and Hermosillo and was released in conjunction with a petition that wants more people to know about the case and to have the Inter-American Commission on Human Rights to accept the case. The hashtag #GuarderiaABC [ABC Daycare] was also viral on Twitter at the time.

In 2016, a documentary directed by Charlie Minn; "49 Angels" was released. The documentary follows the story of the fire and the corruption in Mexico. Minn has made prior documentaries about corruption in Mexico, with one focusing on former Juarez Police Chief Julián Leyzaola.
