= 6th federal electoral district of Sonora =

Federal electoral district of Mexico

Sonora's 6th
- Electoral district of the Chamber of Deputies of Mexico

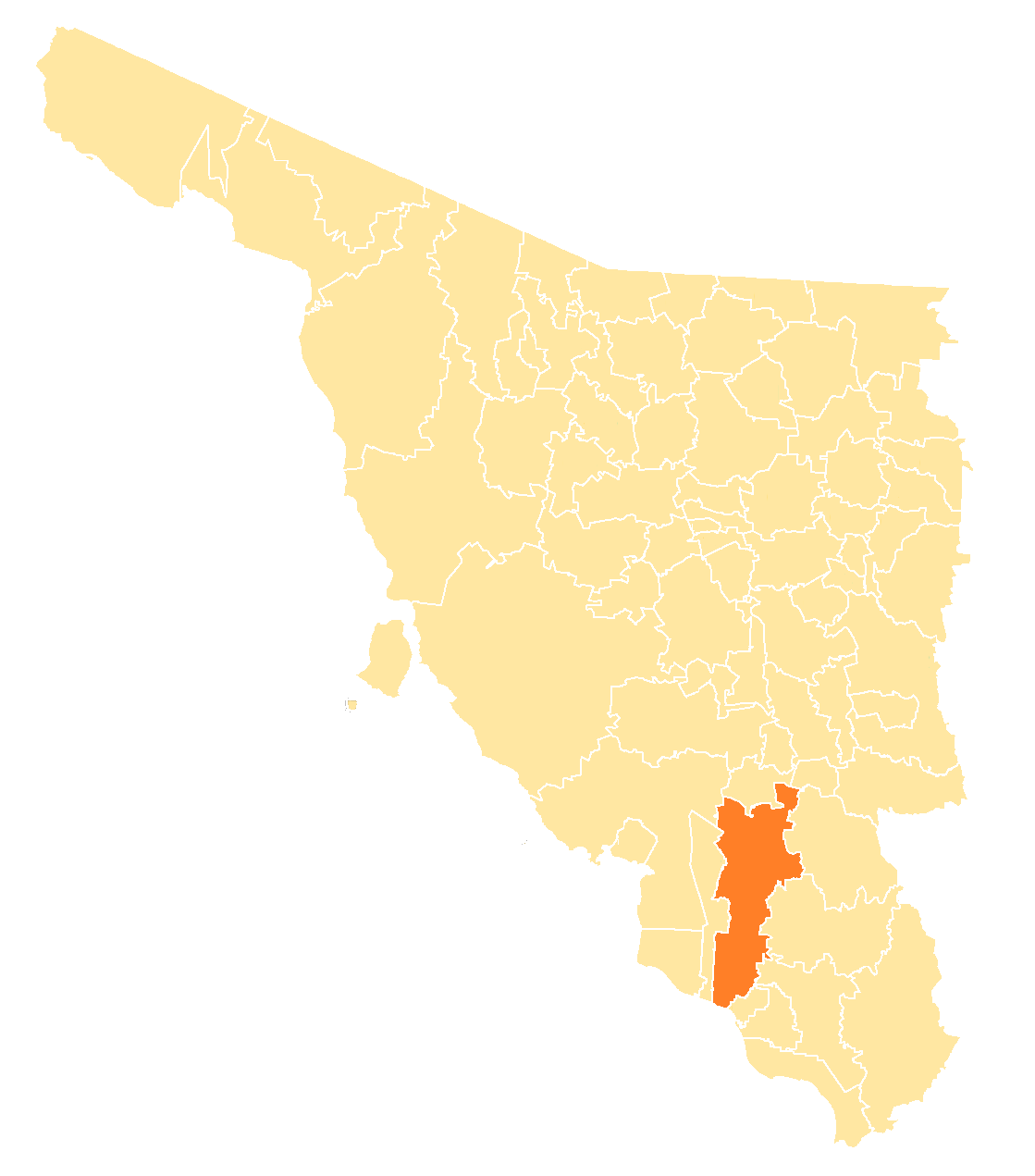
- 6th district since 1996

Incumbent
- Member: Anabel Acosta Islas
- Party: ▌Ecologist Green Party
- Congress: 66th (2024–2027)

District
- State: Sonora
- Head town: Ciudad Obregón
- Coordinates: 27°29′N 109°56′W
- Covers: Cajeme
- PR region: First
- Precincts: 232
- Population: 436,310 (2020 census)

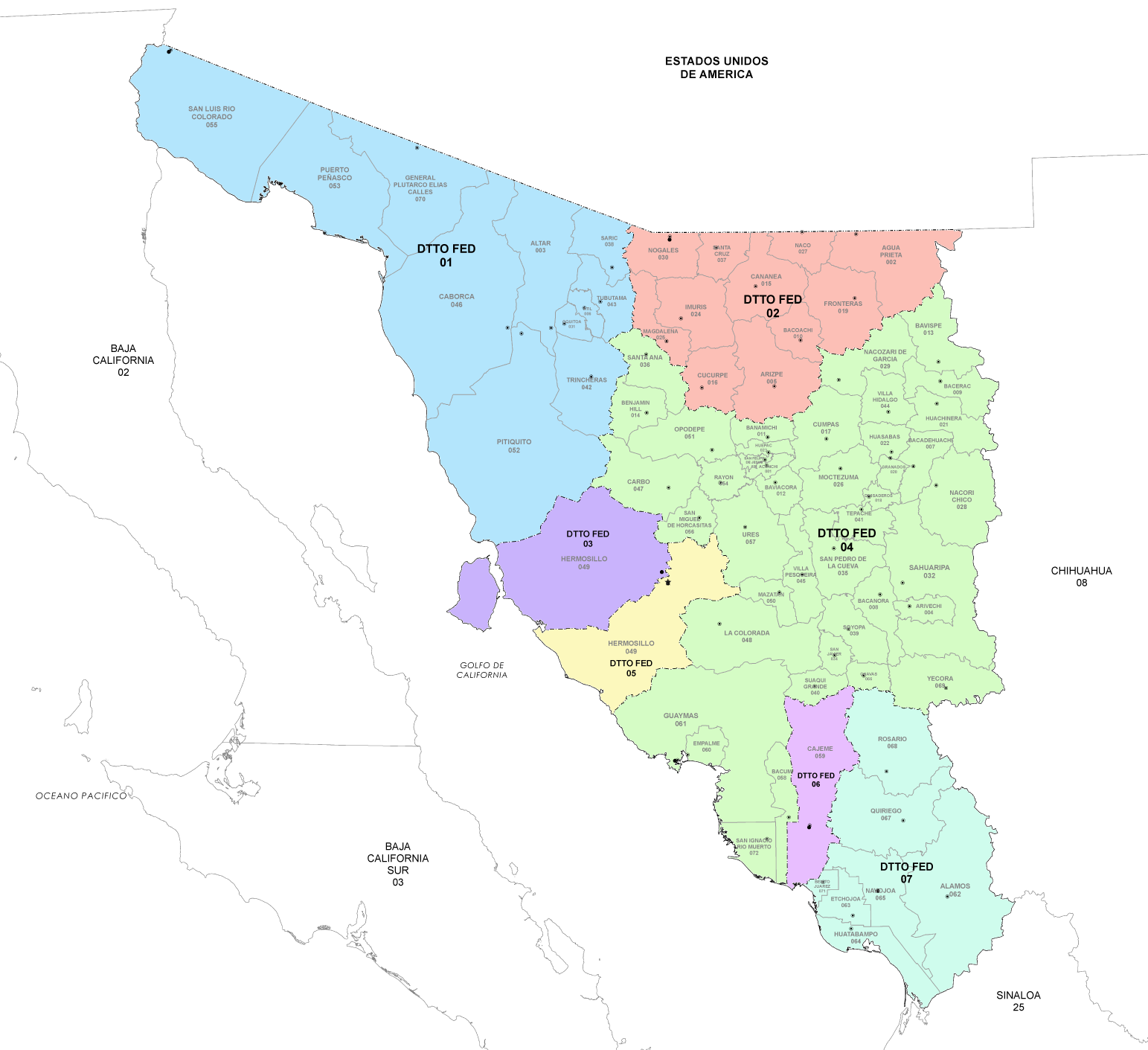
Federal electoral districts of Sonora since 2023

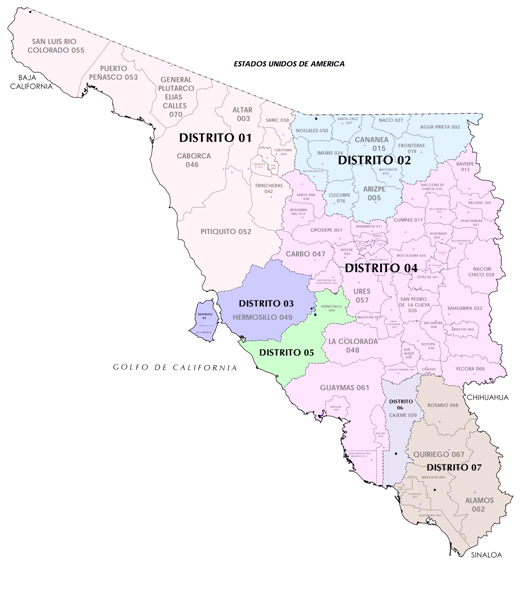
Sonora under the 2017–2022 districting plan

The 6th federal electoral district of Sonora (Spanish: Distrito electoral federal 06 de Sonora) is one of the 300 electoral districts into which Mexico is divided for elections to the federal Chamber of Deputies and one of seven such districts in the state of Sonora.

It elects one deputy to the lower house of Congress for each three-year legislative session by means of the first-past-the-post system. Votes cast in the district also count towards the calculation of proportional representation ("plurinominal") deputies elected from the first region.

The 6th district was created in 1978 and was first contested in the 1979 legislative election.

The current member for the district, elected in the 2024 general election, is Anabel Acosta Islas. Originally elected as a member of National Regeneration Movement (Morena), she switched allegiance to the Ecologist Green Party of Mexico (PVEM) at the start of the legislative session.

== District territory ==
Under the 2023 districting plan adopted by the National Electoral Institute (INE), which is to be used for the 2024, 2027 and 2030 federal elections, Sonora's 6th district comprises the 232 electoral precincts (secciones electorales) that make up the municipality of Cajeme.

The head town (cabecera distrital), where results from individual polling stations are gathered together and tallied, is Ciudad Obregón, the municipal seat and the state's second largest city. The district reported a population of 436,310 in the 2020 census.

== Previous districting schemes ==
Evolution of electoral district numbers
	1974	1978	1996	2005	2017	2023
Sonora	4	7	7	7	7	7
Chamber of Deputies	196	300				

1996–2022

In the 2017, 2005 and 1996 districting plans, the district had the same configuration as in the 2023 scheme.

1978–1996

The districting scheme in force from 1978 to 1996 was the result of the 1977 electoral reforms, which increased the number of single-member seats in the Chamber of Deputies from 196 to 300. Under that plan, Sonora's seat allocation rose from four to seven. The newly created 6th district had its head town at Hermosillo. It covered a part of that city, the rural part of its surrounding municipality, and the municipalities of Álamos, La Colorada, Mazatán, Onavas, Quiriego, Rayón, Rosario San Javier, San Miguel de Horcasitas, Soyopa, Suaqui Grande, Ures and Yécora.

== Deputies returned to Congress ==
(Mexico) National parties
- Current
- PAN
- PRI
- PT
- PVEM
- MC
- Morena
- PAZ
- Somos
- Defunct or local only
- PLM
- PNR
- PRM
- PNM
- PP
- PPS
- PARM
- PFCRN
- CON
- PANAL
- PSD
- PES
- PES
- PRD

Sonora's 6th district
Election	Deputy	Party	Term	Legislature
1979	Fernando Mendoza Contreras	Institutional Revolutionary Party	1979–1982	51st Congress
1982	Rubén Castro Ojeda	Institutional Revolutionary Party	1982–1985	52nd Congress
1985	Jorge Acevedo Samaniego	Institutional Revolutionary Party	1985–1988	53rd Congress
1988	Sergio Jesús Torres Serrano	Institutional Revolutionary Party	1988–1991	54th Congress
1991	Víctor Raúl Burton Trejo	Institutional Revolutionary Party	1991–1994	55th Congress
1994	Alfonso Molina Ruibal	Institutional Revolutionary Party	1994–1997	56th Congress
1997	Saúl Solano Castro	Party of the Democratic Revolution	1997–2000	57th Congress
2000	María del Rosario Oroz Ibarra	Institutional Revolutionary Party	2000–2003	58th Congress
2003	Javier Castelo Parada	National Action Party (Mexico)	2003–2006	59th Congress
2006	Armando Félix Holguín	National Action Party (Mexico)	2006–2009	60th Congress
2009	Rogelio Díaz Brown	Institutional Revolutionary Party	2009–2012	61st Congress
2012	Faustino Félix Chávez	Institutional Revolutionary Party	2012–2015	62nd Congress
2015	Abel Murrieta Gutiérrez	Institutional Revolutionary Party	2015–2018	63rd Congress
2018	Javier Lamarque Cano	National Regeneration Movement	2018–2021	64th Congress
2021	Gabriela Martínez Espinoza	National Regeneration Movement	2021–2024	65th Congress
2024	Anabel Acosta Islas (Note: Originally elected as a member of Morena, Acosta Islas switched allegiance to the Ecologist Green Party of Mexico (PVEM) at the start of the legislative session.)	Ecologist Green Party of Mexico	2024–2027	66th Congress

== Presidential elections ==
Sonora's 6th district
Election	District won by	Party or coalition	%
2018	Andrés Manuel López Obrador	Juntos Haremos Historia	70.3163
2024	Claudia Sheinbaum Pardo	Sigamos Haciendo Historia	68.8805
