= Flor Ayala =

Mexican politician (born 1972)

Federal Deputy of the Congress of the Union by proportional representation from Sonora
- Incumbent
- Assumed office August 29, 2012

Member of the Congress of Sonora from the 12th district
- In office September 16, 2009 – August 28, 2012
- Preceded by: Susana Saldaña Cavazos
- Succeeded by: Pedro Guillermo Mar Hernández

General Director of DIF Sonora
- In office September 14, 2003 – March 20, 2009
- Preceded by: Margarita Elías de Proto
- Succeeded by: Francisco Valenzuela Moreno

Personal details
- Born: April 22, 1972 (age 54) Mexico City, Mexico
- Party: PRI
- Education: Monterrey Institute of Technology
- Profession: Engineering

Flor Ayala Robles Linares (born April 22, 1972) is a Mexican politician. Was Local Deputy for the state of Sonora’s 12th District headed by Hermosillo in the LIX Legislature of the Congress of Sonora. She is currently Federal Deputy by proportional representation in the Chamber of Deputies of the LXII Legislature of the Mexican Congress.

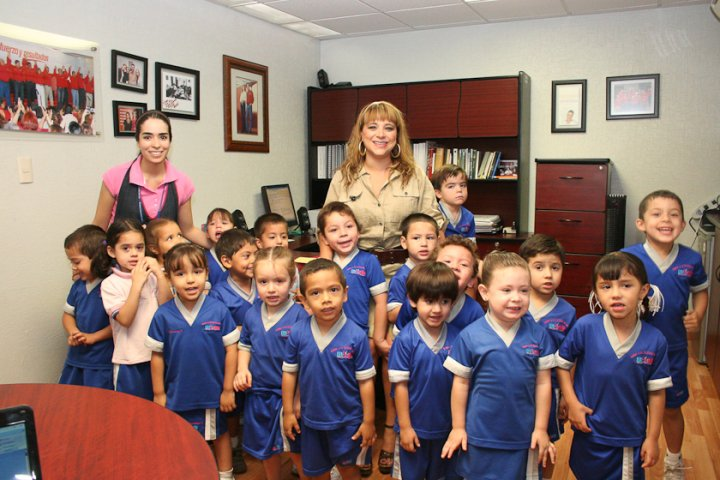
Sonora State Deputy Flor Ayala with children visiting her office

== Education ==
Industrial and Systems Engineer graduate from the Monterrey Institute of Technology, Campus Monterrey. Also has a master's degree in Economics and Government from Anahuac University and a Diploma in the Women's Leadership Program from Harvard University.

== Partisan activity ==
She is a member of the Institutional Revolutionary Party where she has served as State Policy Advisor. In 2011 was named President of the National Association of Legislators Maria Lavalle Urbina in Sonora. Within the Party has been nominated twice, the first in 2009 vying for the XII Local District of Sonora and the second in the 2012 Mexican federal elections for the V Federal District of Sonora.

In political campaigns she was the Candidate's Eduardo Bours Wife Office Coordinator in the campaign for Governor of Sonora in 2003. During Francisco Labastida’s, the Institutional Revolutionary Party candidate, National Presidency Campaign served as Coordinator for Private Sector Liaison and Finance from 1999 until 2000. In the same year 2000 she was Tours and Events Coordinator of the Senator Eduardo Bours.

== Professional career ==
=== Public organisms ===
In 1998 she was head of the Directorate of Economic Development and Productivity in the Representation of Sonora’s State Government. From September 2003 to March 2009 she served as Director of the Family's Integral Development in the state of Sonora.

=== Civil society organisms ===
From January 2001 to February 2003 she was General Director of the Eduardo Bours Foundation. In 1998 she worked at the National Chamber of Commerce Confederation in the General Coordination of the International Assembly of Commerce. That same year she coordinated the National Industrials Convention of the National Chamber of the Transformation Industry. Was President from 1995 to 1997 of the Young Sonoran Development Group Association.

== Elected office ==
=== LIX Legislature of the Congress of Sonora ===
Local Deputy for the XII Local District, headed by Hermosillo in the LXI Legislature of the Congress of Sonora where she presided the Second Finance Commission and was also a member of the Commissions on Social Development and Public Assistance, Border Affairs, Equity and Gender, Health, Attention to Vulnerable Groups of the Society and Water.

=== LXII Legislature of the Mexican Congress ===
Federal Deputy by proportional representation in the Chamber of Deputies in the LXII Legislature of the Mexican Congress.

Preceded by Susana Saldaña Cavazos	Local Deputy from Sonora's 12th local district 2009–2012	Succeeded by Pedro Guillermo Mar Hernández
Preceded by Margarita Elías de Proto	General Director of DIF Sonora; 2003–2009	Succeeded by Francisco Valenzuela Moreno
