= Armando Félix Holguín =

Mexican politician

- Born: 11 July 1948 (age 77); Mexico
- Occupation: Politician
- Political party: PAN

Armando Jesús Félix Holguín (born 11 July 1948) is a Mexican politician from the National Action Party (PAN). From 2006 to 2009 he served as a federal deputy in the 60th session of Congress, representing Sonora's sixth district. He also served as municipal president of Cajeme from 1988 to 1991, and again from 2003 to 2006.

== See also ==
- List of municipal presidents of Cajeme
