= Sampedro =

Sampedro is a surname, and may refer to:

== Drama ==
- Guadalupe Muñoz Sampedro (1896–1975) Spanish film actress
- Matilde Muñoz Sampedro (1900–1969), Spanish film actress
- Mercedes Muñoz Sampedro (1896–1979), Spanish stage and film actress

== Sports ==
- Amanda Sampedro (born 1993), Spanish footballer
- Luis César Sampedro (born 1966), Spanish footballer
- Omar Sampedro (born 1985), Spanish footballer

== Other uses ==
- Alfonso de Bourbon Sampedro (1932–2012), Swiss-American eccentric
- Edelmira Sampedro y Robato (1906–1994), Countess of Covadonga
- Frank "Poncho" Sampedro (born 1949), American musician
- José Luis Sampedro (1917–2013), Spanish economist and novelist
- Juan José Segura-Sampedro (born 1985), Spanish surgeon and researcher
- Lorenia Valles Sampedro (born 1976), Mexican politician
- Melchor García Sampedro (1821–1858), Spanish Dominican missionary and saint
- Ramón Sampedro (1943–1998), Spanish fisherman who fought for right of assisted suicide
- Tomás García Sampedro (1860–1937), Spanish painter
