= Lorenia Valles Sampedro =

Mexican female politician

Senator for Sonora
- In office 1 September 2024 – 22 June 2026

Member of the Chamber of Deputies for Sonora's 3rd district
- In office 1 September 2018 – 12 September 2021

Member of the Chamber of Deputies Plurinominal
- In office 29 August 2012 – 31 August 2015

Personal details
- Born: 18 December 1976 (age 49) Hermosillo, Sonora, Mexico
- Party: MORENA
- Other political affiliations: PRD
- Occupation: Politician

Lorenia Iveth Valles Sampedro (Note: In this Mexican name, the surname is Valles and the second or maternal family name is Sampedro.) (born 18 December 1976) is a Mexican politician from the state of Sonora. Currently affiliated with the MORENA party, she previously belonged to the Party of the Democratic Revolution (PRD).

She served as a plurinominal deputy in the 62nd Congress (2012–2015) representing the first region as a member of the Party of the Democratic Revolution. She returned to the Chamber of Deputies in 2018, representing Sonora's 3rd district for MORENA during the 64th Congress. She was re-elected for Sonora's 3rd in the 2021 mid-terms, but resigned her seat at the start of the congressional session to serve in the cabinet of Governor of Sonora Alfonso Durazo Montaño.

Valles Sampedro won election as one of Sonora's senators in the 2024 Senate election, occupying the first place on the National Regeneration Movement's two-name formula. She requested an indefinite leave of absence from her congressional duties on 22 June 2026.

On 28 September 2026, she was announced as Morena's "state coordinator for the defence of the transformation and national sovereignty", in which capacity she is expected to represent the party in the Sonora gubernatorial election of 6 June 2027.
