= 3rd federal electoral district of Sonora =

Federal electoral district of Mexico

Sonora's 3rd
- Electoral district of the Chamber of Deputies of Mexico

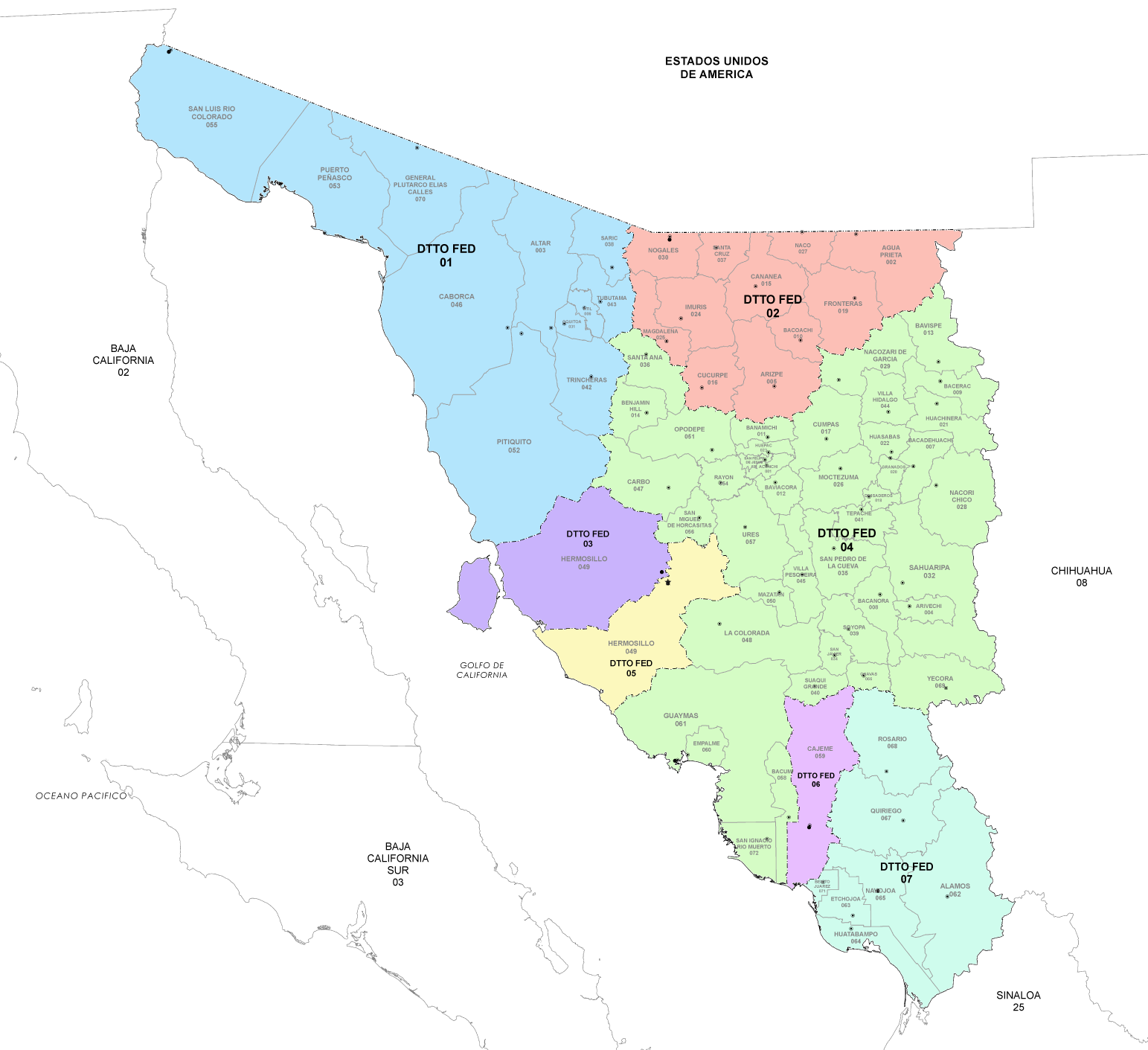
- 3rd district since 2023

Incumbent
- Member: Diana Karina Barreras
- Party: ▌Labour Party
- Congress: 66th (2024–2027)

District
- State: Sonora
- Head town: Hermosillo
- Coordinates: 29°05′N 110°15′W
- Covers: Municipality of Hermosillo (part)
- PR region: First
- Precincts: 200
- Population: 467,597 (2020 census)

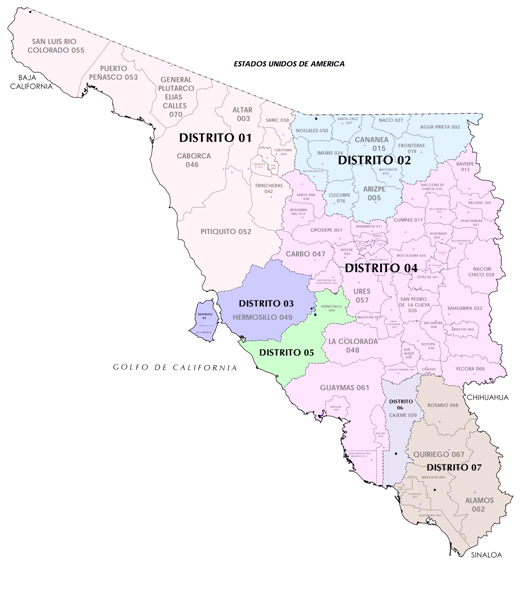
Sonora under the 2017–2022 districting plan

The 3rd federal electoral district of Sonora (Spanish: Distrito electoral federal 03 de Sonora) is one of the 300 electoral districts into which Mexico is divided for elections to the federal Chamber of Deputies and one of seven such districts in the state of Sonora.

It elects one deputy to the lower house of Congress for each three-year legislative session by means of the first-past-the-post system. Votes cast in the district also count towards the calculation of proportional representation ("plurinominal") deputies elected from the first region.

The current member for the district, elected in the 2024 general election, is Diana Karina Barreras Samaniego of the Labour Party (PT), the wife of fellow deputy Sergio Gutiérrez Luna (Morena).

== District territory ==
Under the 2023 districting plan adopted by the National Electoral Institute (INE), which is to be used for the 2024, 2027 and 2030 federal elections, Sonora's 3rd district covers 200 electoral precincts (secciones electorales) across the north-western half of the municipality of Hermosillo, including Tiburón Island.

The head town (cabecera distrital), where results from individual polling stations are gathered together and tallied, is the state capital, the city of Hermosillo. The district reported a population of 467,597 in the 2020 census.

== Previous districting schemes ==
Evolution of electoral district numbers
	1974	1978	1996	2005	2017	2023
Sonora	4	7	7	7	7	7
Chamber of Deputies	196	300				

2017–2022

Between 2017 and 2022, the district covered the north-western half of the municipality of Hermosillo, similar to the 2023 scheme.

2005–2017

Under the 2005 plan, the district covered a north-western portion of the municipality of Hermosillo, with its head town in the state capital.

1996–2005

Under the 1996 districting plan, the head town was at Hermosillo and the district covered the northern half of the municipality.

1978–1996

The districting scheme in force from 1978 to 1996 was the result of the 1977 electoral reforms, which increased the number of single-member seats in the Chamber of Deputies from 196 to 300. Under that plan, Sonora's seat allocation rose from four to seven. The 3rd district had its head town at Guaymas and it covered the municipalities of Bácum, Guaymas and Empalme.

== Deputies returned to Congress ==
(Mexico) National parties
- Current
- PAN
- PRI
- PT
- PVEM
- MC
- Morena
- PAZ
- Somos
- Defunct or local only
- PLM
- PNR
- PRM
- PNM
- PP
- PPS
- PARM
- PFCRN
- CON
- PANAL
- PSD
- PES
- PES
- PRD

Sonora's 3rd district
Election	Deputy	Party	Term	Legislature
1916	Ramón Ross		1916–1917	Constituent Congress of Querétaro
...
1976	José Luis Vargas González	Institutional Revolutionary Party	1976–1979	50th Congress
1979	Hugo Romero Ojeda	Institutional Revolutionary Party	1979–1982	51st Congress
1982	Hugo Romero Ojeda	Institutional Revolutionary Party	1982–1985	52nd Congress
1985	Manlio Fabio Beltrones	Institutional Revolutionary Party	1985–1988	53rd Congress
1988	Julián Luzanilla Contreras	Institutional Revolutionary Party	1988–1991	54th Congress
1991	Julián Luzanilla Contreras	Institutional Revolutionary Party	1991–1994	55th Congress
1994	Heriberto Lizárraga Zatarain	Institutional Revolutionary Party	1994–1997	56th Congress
1997	Manuel Cornelio Peñuñuri Noriega	National Action Party (Mexico)	1997–2000	57th Congress
2000	Vicente Pacheco Castañeda	National Action Party (Mexico)	2000–2003	58th Congress
2003	Homero Ríos Murrieta	National Action Party (Mexico)	2003–2006	59th Congress
2006	Luis Serrato Castell	National Action Party (Mexico)	2006–2009	60th Congress
2009	Ernesto de Lucas Hopkins	Institutional Revolutionary Party	2009–2012	61st Congress
2012	Alejandra López Noriega	National Action Party (Mexico)	2012–2015	62nd Congress
2015	Javier Antonio Neblina Vega	National Action Party (Mexico)	2015–2018	63rd Congress
2018	Lorenia Valles Sampedro	National Regeneration Movement	2018–2022	64th Congress
2021	Lorenia Valles Sampedro (Note: Valles Sampedro resigned her seat on 12 September 2021 to serve in the cabinet of Governor Alfonso Durazo; she was replaced for the remainder of her congressional term by her alternate, Peña Escalante.); Amairany Peña Escalante	National Regeneration Movement	2021–2024	65th Congress
2024	Diana Karina Barreras Samaniego	Labour Party (Mexico)	2024–2027	66th Congress

== Presidential elections ==
Sonora's 3rd district
Election	District won by	Party or coalition	%
2018	Andrés Manuel López Obrador	Juntos Haremos Historia	58.8408
2024	Claudia Sheinbaum Pardo	Sigamos Haciendo Historia	61.9564
