= Valles =

Valles may refer to:

== Places ==
- Interandean Valles, a region in the central Andes of Peru, Bolivia, and northwest Argentina
- Vallès, a region in Catalonia, Spain, comprising the comarques of Vallès Occidental and Vallès Oriental
- Vallés, Valencia, a town in the Valencian Community, Spain
- Valles Caldera, New Mexico, United States

== People ==
- Jules Vallès (1832–1885), French writer and political activist
- Arlington Valles (1886–1970), Oscar-winning costume designer
- Judith Valles (born 1933), mayor of San Bernardino and educator
- Romulo Valles (born 1951), Filipino prelate, Archdiocese of Davao
- Lorenia Valles (born 1976), Mexican politician
- Mario Valles (born 1977), Colombian judoka
- Max Valles (born 1994), American football player
- Hakeem Valles, (born 1992), American football player
