= María Jesús Guirado Ibarra =

María Jesús Guirado Ibarra (June 8, 1910 – November 15, 1987) was a Mexican activist, labor leader, and politician from Sonora. She was the first woman to lead the Central de Trabajadores de Sonora union and the first female deputy elected to the Congress of Sonora.

== Early life and education ==
María Jesús Guirado Ibarra was born in Álamos, Sonora, in 1910. Her parents were Manuel Guirado and María Ibarra.

In 1936, her family moved to Navojoa, Sonora, where she began to work as a seamstress at the La Bengala textile factory. She eventually became a manager of the factory, which was the largest in the region at that time.

== Labor leader ==
In the 1930s, Guirado Ibarra became one of the first Sonoran women to participate in labor organizing, as part of her union at the textile factory. In 1942, she became secretary-general of the Sindicato Femenil de Costureras de Navojoa, a union of 270 seamstresses affiliated with the Central de Trabajadores de Sonora (CTS). She was named secretary-general of CTS in 1955, the first woman to hold this position.

She also became the leader of the Centro de Capacitación Femenil de Navojoa, a women's organization, in 1952.

== Political career ==
In the Sonoran Valle del Mayo, she combined her union organizing with political and social efforts in support of the region's working-class and peasant populations, collaborating with leaders like the governors Ignacio Soto and Álvaro Obregón Tapia.

The Institutional Revolutionary Party selected her as a candidate for deputy in the Congress of Sonora in 1955. She was the only woman running for the legislature at the time, and women had just gained the right to vote two years prior. On July 3 of that year, she became the first Sonoran woman to be elected to any office in the state.

Guirado Ibarra joined the 41st Legislature of the Congress of Sonora, serving from 1955 to 1959 as a full member representing Navojoa's District 9. Her alternate was Esther B. Padilla, a fellow seamstress' union member.

It would be 12 years before another woman, the writer Enriqueta de Parodi, would be elected to the state legislature as a full member.

== Death and legacy ==
Guirado Ibarra died at age 77 in Hermosillo, Sonora, in 1987. She is buried at Hermosillo's Panteón Yáñez cemetery.

In 2023, she became the first woman included on the Wall of Honor in the Congress of Sonora's legislative chamber.
