= José Luis León Perea =

Mexican politician

- Born: 12 August 1947 (age 78); Tulancingo, Hidalgo, Mexico
- Education: UNAM, Naval Medical School
- Occupations: Physician, politician
- Political party: PRI

José Luis Marcos León Perea (Note: In this Spanish name, the first or paternal surname is León and the second or maternal family name is Perea.) (born 12 August 1947) is a Mexican physician and politician from the Institutional Revolutionary Party (PRI).

León Perea was born in Tulancingo, Hidalgo, in 1947. He holds a degree in medicine from the National Autonomous University of Mexico (UNAM) and served 25 years in the medical service of the Mexican Navy, rising to the rank of capitán de corbeta.

From 2006 to 2009 he sat in the Congress of Sonora during its 58th session. In the 2009 mid-term election, he was elected to the Chamber of Deputies to represent Sonora's 4th district during the 61st session of Congress.
