= Antimonumento 49 ABC =

Anti-monument in Mexico City

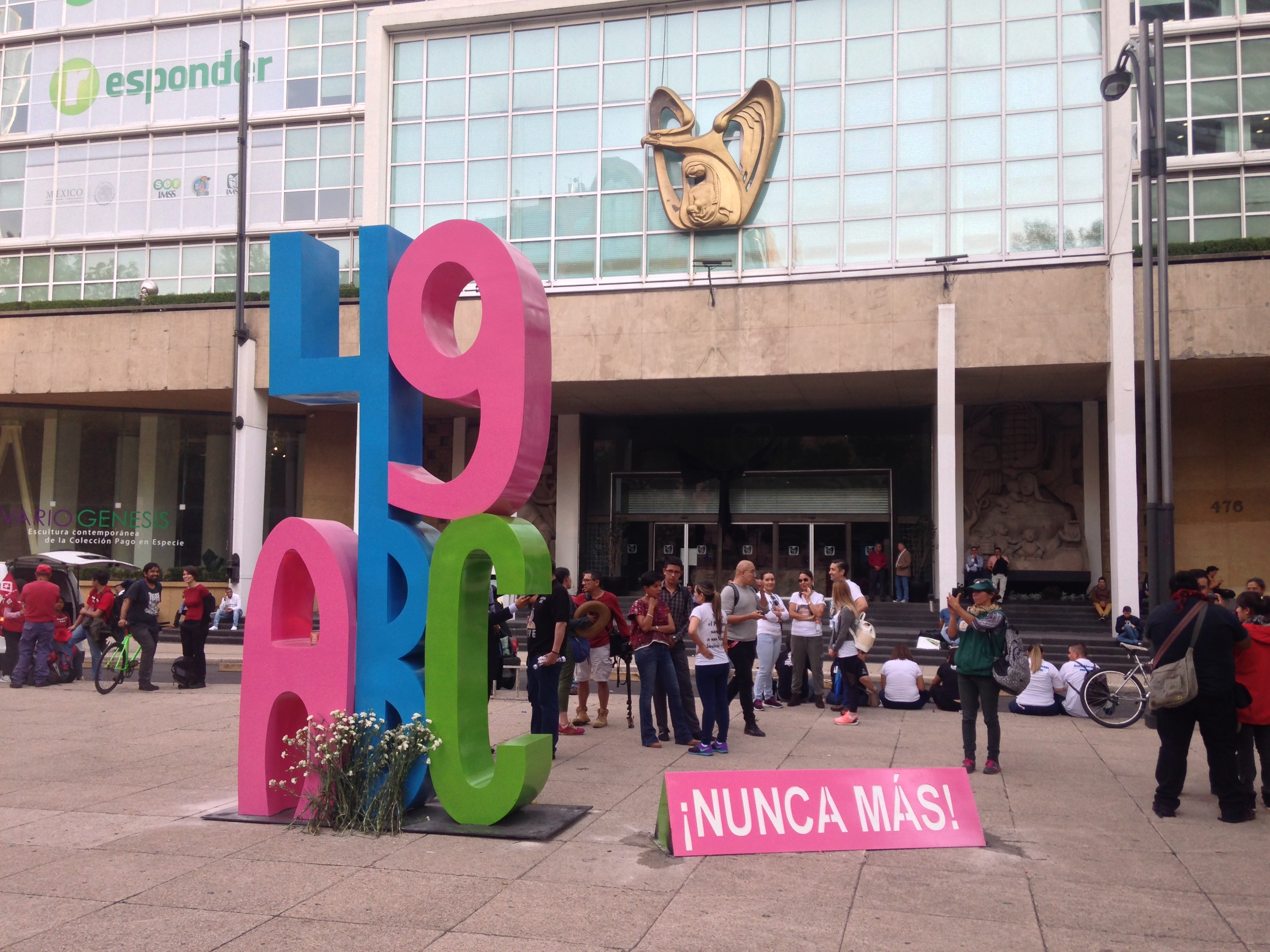
- The anti-monument after the installation
- Location
- Location: Mexico City, Mexico
- Coordinates: 19°25′26″N 99°10′25″W
- Designer: Anonymous demonstrators
- Type: Antimonumento
- Material: Steel
- Height: Approx. 4 m (13 ft)
- Weight: 1 t (0.98 long tons; 1.1 short tons)
- Opening date: 5 June 2017
- Dedicated to: The victims of the 2009 Hermosillo daycare center fire

The Antimonumento 49 ABC is an antimonumento (anti-monument) installed opposite the Mexican Social Security Institute Headquarters, on Paseo de la Reforma Avenue, in the Cuauhtémoc borough of Mexico City. Demonstrators erected it on 5 June 2017 during the eighth anniversary protest related to the 2009 Hermosillo daycare center fire in Hermosillo, Sonora, where forty-nine children died. The colorful metallic work included the installation of the number 49 and the ABC initials.

It was never given an official name and those who installed it referred to it simply as Antimonumento; it is known as Antimonumento 49 ABC because of its physical characteristics, although it is also known by other names. Two years later, sculptures shaped like children's shoes were installed at the base, but were later stolen. In 2024, a replica monument was installed in Hermosillo.

== Background ==
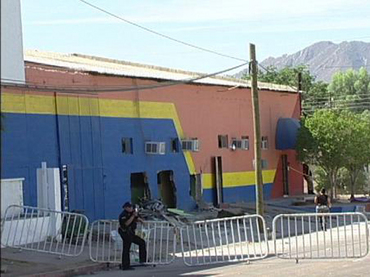
The daycare after the fire

On 5 June 2009, a warehouse belonging to the Mexican Social Security Institute (IMSS) caught fire in Hermosillo, Sonora. Adjacent to the building was the Guardería ABC (ABC Day Care), a day care center outsourced by the IMSS. At the time of the fire, it hosted 176 children between the ages of five months and five years. In total, forty-nine of them died and eighty children were left with lifelong injuries. The daycare center lacked emergency exits, fire extinguishers, and a fire suppression system; it also had faulty electrical installations, a flammable false ceiling, and untrained staff. Nevertheless, it had received a satisfactory safety inspection just two weeks earlier. The Attorney General of Mexico conducted an investigation and attributed the cause to an overheated ventilation system in the warehouse. Independent investigations, however, concluded that the fire was deliberately set to destroy tons of stored documents.

The Guardería ABC was co-owned by a cousin of Margarita Zavala, the first lady of Mexico and wife of president Felipe Calderón. None of the co-owners or high-ranking politicians faced prosecution. Only Delia Irene Botello, a former regional daycare coordinator, was tried and served a three-year prison sentence. Twenty-two former employees of the daycare center faced charges of negligent injury, as they were found to have failed to take action to protect or rescue the children during the incident.

== History and installation ==
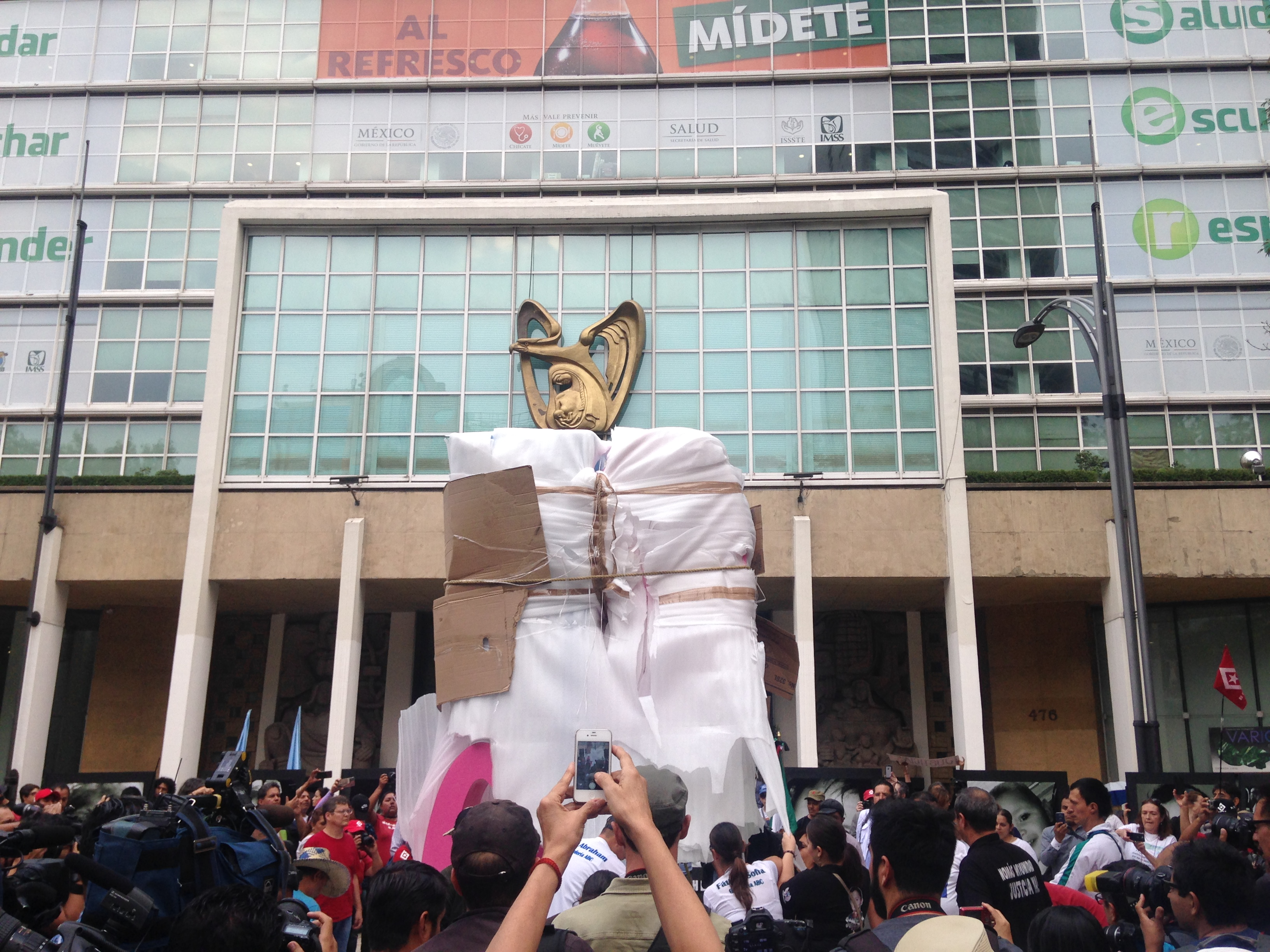
The sculpture before its unveiling

Demonstrators had marched every June in Hermosillo and Mexico City to demand justice for the victims of the fire. In Mexico City, the mobilization typically followed a route from the Angel of Independence monument, along Paseo de la Reforma, to the Zócalo in the historic city center. On 5 June 2017, protesters went to the opposite direction, heading toward the IMSS headquarters. A truck was waiting for them, from which they unloaded several metal structures.

During its installation, they cried out for justice in the case and named the victims, while the commission created by affected parents, Comisión ABC Nunca Más, stated in Spanish:

In front of their towering buildings, their government offices, and their tourist avenues, the appearance of normalcy is finally broken: everyone must know that the IMSS and the Mexican State owe us the lives and happiness of our children. Even if they try to ignore it or look the other way, they will have to see this anti-monument and remember the pain they have caused us.

The Antimonumento 49 ABC is a metallic sculpture featuring the number 49 above the letters ABC, painted in blue, pink, and green. On its side, it bears a small pink plaque that says ¡Nunca más!, Spanish for "never again". The main sculpture is approximately 4 meters (13 ft) tall and weighs 1 metric ton (0.98 long tons; 1.1 short tons).

On 5 June 2019, activists installed twenty-five bronze sculptures in the shape of children's shoes. The plaque below them includes the names of each victim. Two weeks later, between seven or eight of them had been reported stolen. On 25 May 2026, family members installed replicas of the shoes.

Activists installed a replica of the Antimonumento 49 ABC in Plaza Emiliana de Zubeldia in Hermosillo on 5 May 2024.

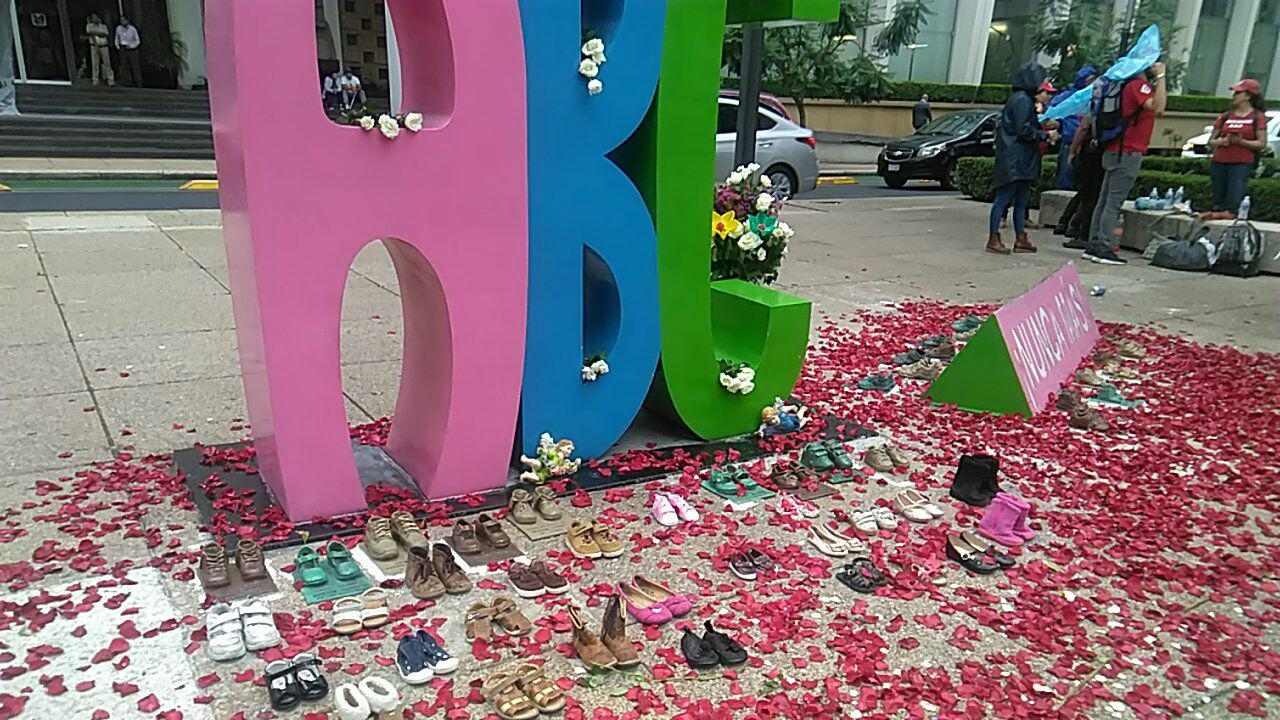
The sculpture on 5 June 2019 following the installation of the children shoes sculptures.

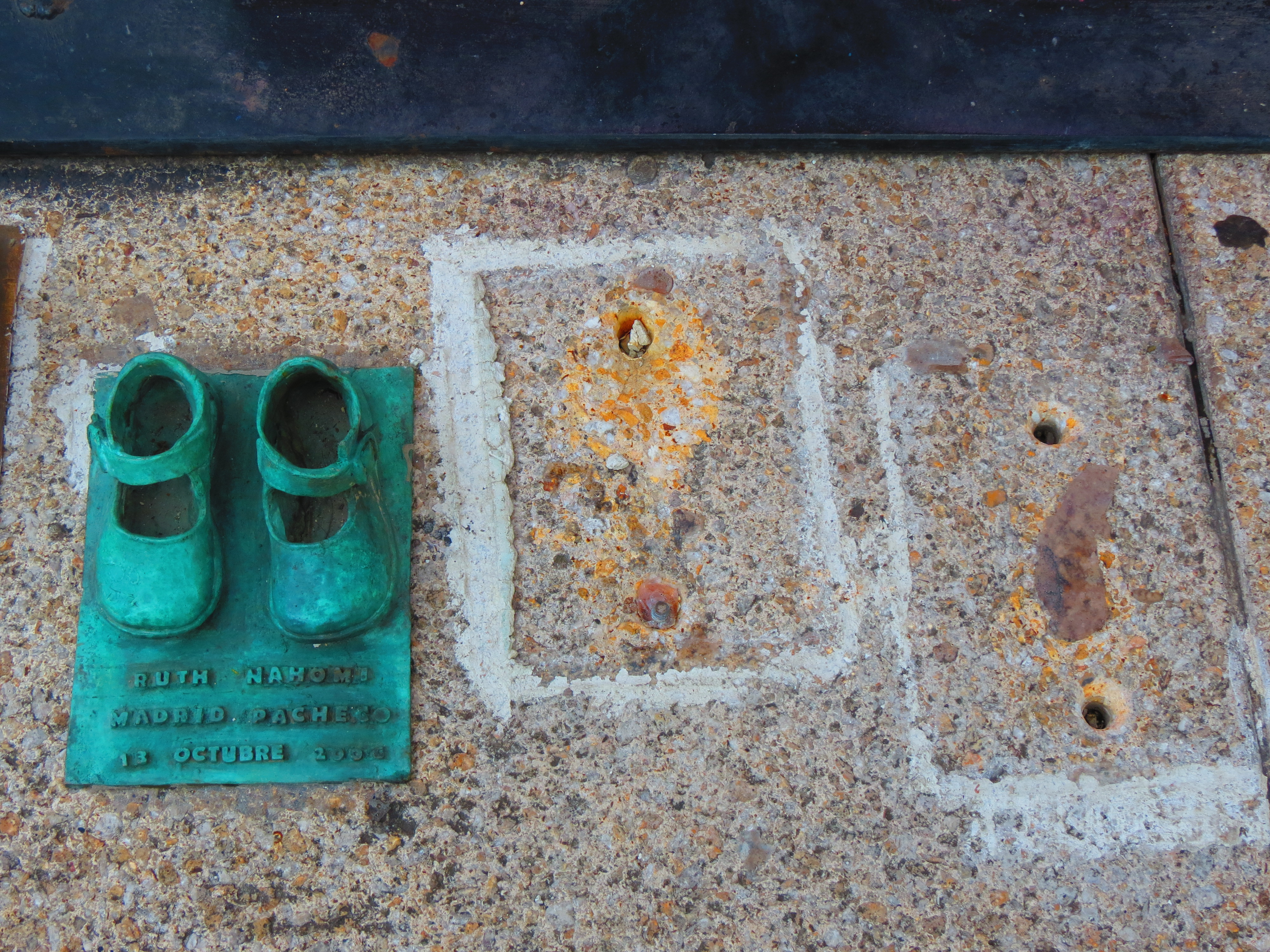
A bronze sculpture depicting toddler shoes on 29 June 2019, with missing spaces in the locations of those that were stolen.
