= Perea (surname) =

Perea is a Spanish language locational surname, which originally meant a person from one of the various places called Perea in Spain. The name may refer to:

- Alberto Perea (born 1990), Spanish footballer
- Brayan Perea (born 1993), Colombian footballer
- Édgar Perea (1934–2016), Colombian politician
- Edixon Perea (born 1984), Colombian footballer
- Emmanuel Perea (born 1985), Argentine footballer
- Enrique Perea Quintanilla (1956–2006), Mexican journalist
- Esteban de Perea (died 1639), Spanish missionary
- Fran Perea (born 1978), Spanish actor and singer
- Francisco Perea (1830–1913), American politician
- Gabby Perea (born 2002), American artistic gymnast
- Henry Perea (born 1977), American politician
- Ítalo Perea (born 1993), Ecuadorian boxer
- José Emilio Perea (born 1983), Mexican boxer
- Jose Luis León Perea (born 1947), Mexican politician
- Juan José Perea (born 2000), Colombian footballer
- Juan Perea Capulino (1890–1967), Spanish general
- Julia Pérez Montes de Oca (1839–1875), Cuban poet
- Luis Alberto Perea (born 1986), Colombian footballer
- Luis Amaranto Perea (born 1979), Colombian footballer
- Luis Carlos Perea (born 1963), Colombian footballer
- Miguel Benzo Perea (born 1951), Spanish journalist and diplomat
- Nicolás Perea (born 1992), Colombian footballer
- Nixon Perea (born 1973), Colombian footballer
- Patricia Díaz Perea (born 1984), Spanish athlete
- Pedro Perea (1852–1906), American politician
- Robert L. Perea (born 1953), American writer
- Sebastián Pozas Perea (1876–1946), Spanish general
