= Luis Gerardo Serrato Castell =

Mexican politician

- Born: 25 July 1975 (age 50); Sonora, Mexico
- Occupation: Politician
- Political party: PAN

Luis Gerardo Serrato Castell (born 25 July 1975) is a Mexican politician from the National Action Party (PAN). From 2006 to 2009 he served as a federal deputy in the 60th Congress, representing Sonora's third district.
