= José Enrique Reina Lizárraga =

Mexican politician

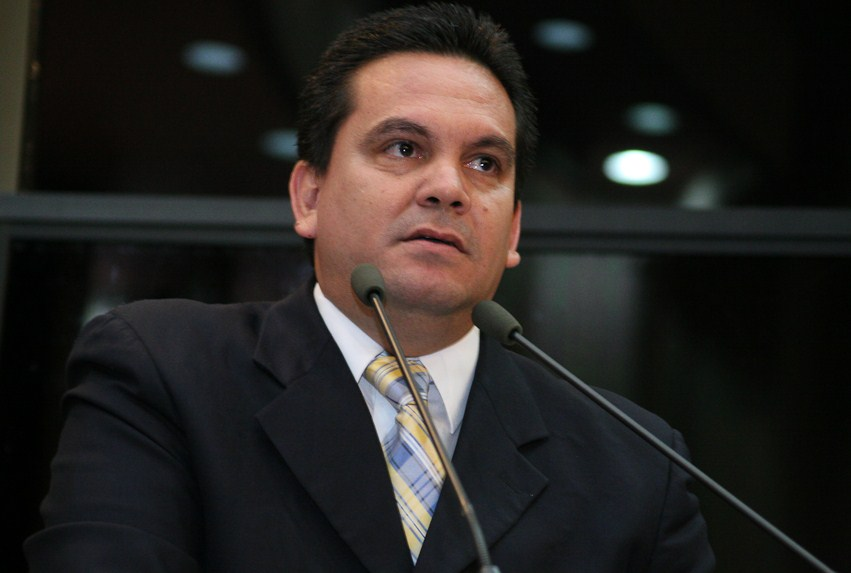
- Lizárraga in 2010
- Born: 12 August 1969 (age 56); Pitiquito, Sonora, Mexico
- Occupation: Deputy
- Political party: PAN

José Enrique Reina Lizárraga (born 12 August 1969) is a Mexican politician affiliated with the National Action Party (PAN). He served as a federal deputy during the 62nd session of Congress, representing Sonora's first district. He had previously served as a local deputy in the 59th session of the Congress of Sonora. He was also the mayor of San Luis Río Colorado from 2000 to 2003 and 2015 to 2018.
