= List of municipal presidents of Cajeme =

Following is a list of municipal presidents of Cajeme, in the Mexican state of Sonora:

Term	Municipal president	Political party	Notes
1927-1928	Ignacio Ruiz Armenta		
1928–1929	Ignacio Mondaca Hernandez		
1929–1930	Gustavo Dolores Cuevas		
1930–1931	Flavio Bórquez		
1931–1932	Viviano Martínez		
1932–1932	Vicente Mexía Lopez		
1932–1933	Manuel López Rivera		
1933–1935	Manuel M. Escamilla	PNR	
1935–1935	Antonio Salmón	PNR	
1935–1937	Matías Méndez Limón	PLM	
1937–1937	Francisco Urbalejo	PNR	
1937–1937	Felipe Ruiz	PNR	
16/09/1937–03/04/1938	Wistano García	PNR	
03/04/1938–15/04/1938	Félix Verduzco	PRM	
15/04/1938–28/11/1938	Manuel M. Aguirre	PRM	
29/11/1938–16/09/1939	Rafael A. Guirado	PRM	
1939–1940	Ramón M. Real	PRM	
1940–1940	Ignacio C. García	PRM	
1940–1941	Faustino Félix Gastélum	PRM	
1941–1943	Abelardo B. Sobarzo	PRM	
1943–1946	Heriberto Salazar	PRM	
1946–1949	Vicente Padilla Hernández	PRI	
1949–1952	Miguel Guerrero Verduzco	PRI	
1952–1955	Rodolfo Elías Calles	PRI	
1955–1958	René Gándara Romo	PRI	
1958–1958	Antonio Valdez Corbala	PRI	Acting municipal president
1958–1961	Jesus Encarnación Chávez Lopez	PRI	
1961–1964	Faustino Félix Serna	PRI	
1964–1967	Ángel López Gutiérrez	PRI	
1967–1970	Eduardo Bours	PRI	
1970–1970	Rubén H. Meza	PRI	Acting municipal president
1970–1970	Luis Antillón Peñúñuri	PRI	Acting municipal president
1970–1970	José Romano Félix	PRI	Acting municipal president
1970–1972	Carlos López Arias	PRI	
1972–1973	Alonso Hernando Pola	PRI	
1973–1976	Rodolfo León Manzo	PRI	
1976–1979	Óscar Russo Vogel	PRI	
1979–1982	Adalberto Rosas López	PAN	
1982–1985	Eduardo Estrella Acedo	PRI	
1985–1988	Sóstenes Valenzuela Miller	PRI	
1988–1991	Armando Félix Holguín	PRI	
1991–1993	Faustino Félix Escalante	PRI	
1993–1994	Sergio Gastélum de la Vega	PRI	
1994–1997	Raúl Ayala Candelas	PRI	
1997–2000	Carlos Javier Lamarque Cano	PRD	
2000–2003	Ricardo Bours Castelo	PRI	
2003–2006	Armando Félix Holguín	PAN	
2006–2009	Francisco Villanueva Salazar	PRI; Panal	Alliance PRI Sonora-Panal
2009	Roberto Zaragoza Félix	PRI; Panal	Acting president municipal. Alliance PRI Sonora-Panal
2009–2012	Manuel Barro Borgaro	PAN	
2012–2015	Rogelio Díaz-Brown Ramsburgh	PRI	
2015–2018	Faustino Félix Chávez	PRI	
2018–2021	Sergio Pablo Mariscal Alvarado	Morena	
2021–2024	Carlos Javier Lamarque Cano	Morena	
2024–	Carlos Javier Lamarque Cano	Morena; PVEM; PT; Panal Sonora PES Sonora	He was reelected
2026-	Claudia Fabiola Santacruz Avilés	Morena; PVEM; PT; Panal Sonora PES Sonora	Interim period
