= Náinari Lake =

- Laguna del Náinari (Spanish)
- Location within Mexico
- Location: Sonora, Mexico
- Coordinates: 27.497°N 109.970°W
- Type: artificial lake

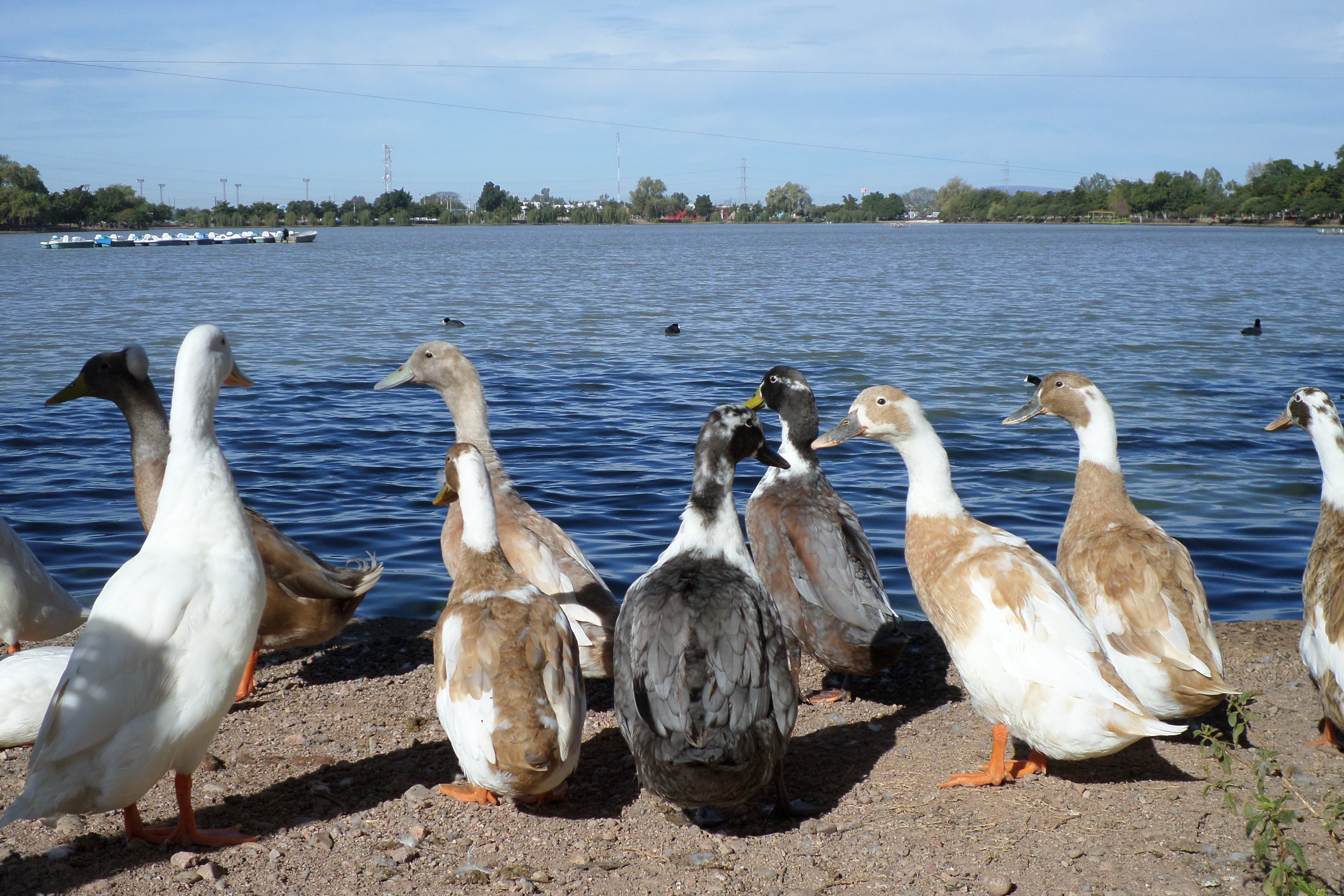
Ducks in Náinari Lake. Sonora, Mexico.

Náinari Lake (Spanish: Laguna del Náinari) is an artificial lake with a 2 kilometres (1.2 mi) perimeter created in a zone of small lagoons in the west side of Ciudad Obregón, Mexico).

The lake houses many species of aquatic wildlife and attracts many different varieties of duck and birds. You can often see families with children congregating along the shoreline feeding the hundreds of turtles and various species of fish that have become custom to the visitors of the lake.
