= Sonora Institute of Technology =

Public university in Ciudad Obregón, Sonora, Mexico

- Instituto Tecnológico de Sonora
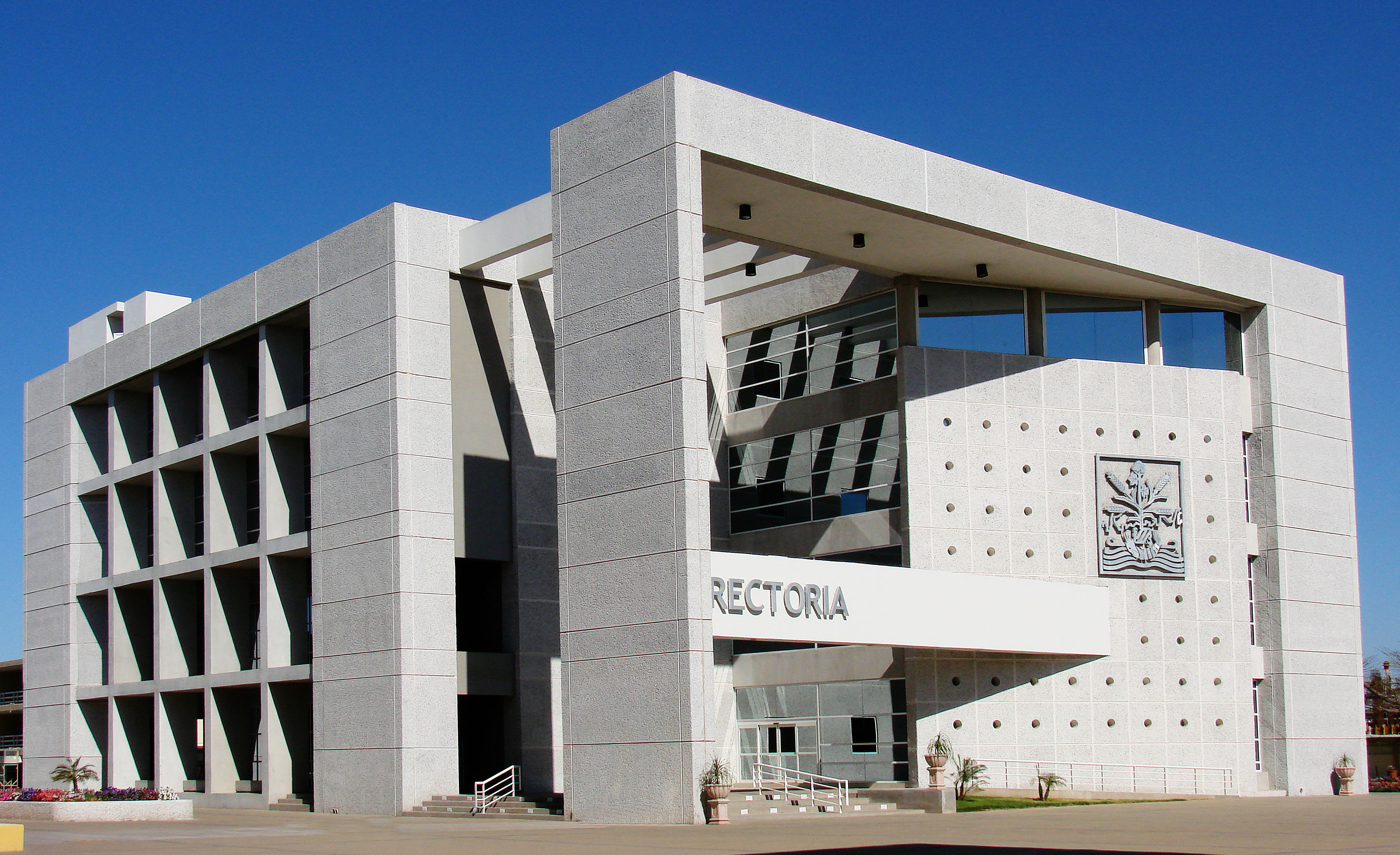
- The Rectorate
- Former names: Instituto Justo Sierra (Justo Sierra Institute), Instituto Tecnológico del Noroeste (Northwestern Institute of Technology)
- Type: Public university
- Established: 1955
- Affiliations: ANUIES CONAHEC International Association of Universities OECD-IMHE
- Rector: Dr. Jesús Héctor Hernández López
- Faculty: 81 (full-time)
- Students: 16,327
- Location: Obregón, Sonora, Mexico; 27.4837°N 109.9340°W
- Campus: Obregón, Guaymas and Navojoa (mostly urban).
- Website: http://www.itson.mx/

The Sonora Institute of Technology (in Spanish: Instituto Tecnológico de Sonora, ITSON) is a Mexican public university based in Ciudad Obregón, Sonora, with satellite campuses in Guaymas, Empalme and Navojoa. Founded in 1955 as a preparatory school called Justo Sierra Institute (Instituto Justo Sierra), it was initially sponsored by Lions International until 1956, when it renamed as Northwestern Institute of Technology (Instituto Tecnológico del Noroeste). In 1962, Governor Luis Encinas Johnson approved a state law that restructured the institution and gave it its current name.

== History ==
The institution was the result of the efforts of the community of Cajeme, led by the president of the local chapter of Lions International, Moisés Vásquez Gudiño. After several restructurations, it became a public university in 1964 when it began to offer a bachelor's degree in Industrial Engineering. By 1976 the program in Business Administration was added and it stopped offering secondary-level education. In 1979 under the administration of Dr. Óscar Russo Vogel, the institution started expansion programs that continued in the 1980s to serve a growing-demand.

The main campus (located in Ciudad Obregón) consisted of only five buildings and the Navojoa campus served its students in a leased building. In 1981 the campus added its administration building to its infrastructure. In 1982 main campus added classrooms and the Náinari campus added the unit for Veterinary and Zoology studies. The Guaymas campus was added in 1984 and the Navojoa campus was moved into its own building.

== Campuses ==
- Central and Náinari, in Obregón.
- Central and South, in Navojoa.
- Guaymas
- Empalme

== Academics ==
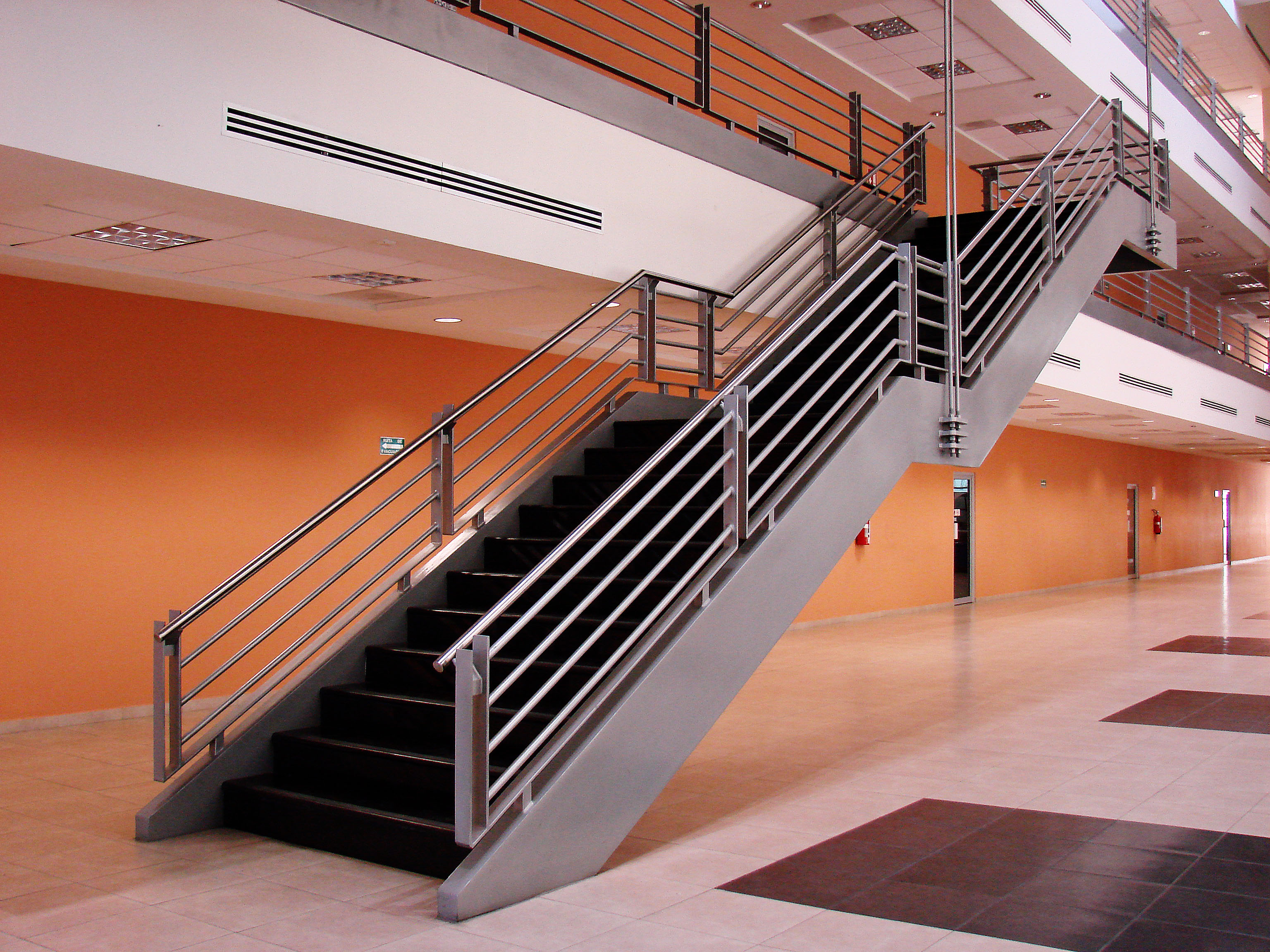
Classrooms inside its Center for Business and Strategic Studies (CEEN).

The Institute offers the following programs:

- An Associate's degree in Childhood Development.
- Licentiate degrees in Administration, Tourism Management, Education, Physical Education Sciences, Accounting, Physical Culture and Sports Management, Graphic Design, Economics and Finances, Arts Management and Development, Psychology, and Entrepreneurship and Innovation.
- Bachelor's degrees in Food Technology, Software Engineering, Biotechnology Engineering, Bio-systems Engineering, Civil Engineering, Environmental Sciences, Electronics Engineering, Electrical Engineering, Industrial and Systems Engineering, Chemical Engineering, Manufacturing Engineering, Veterinary Medicine and Zootechnics.
- Master's degrees in Administration, Information Technologies Management, Engineering, Agribusiness Administration, Natural Resources, Organizational Development and Management, Economics and Finances, Education, Logistics and Quality Systems, Business Incubation and Acceleration, Construction Administration, Production Systems, Electrical Technology Administration, Hydraulics Resources Administration, International Business Intelligence and Psychology.
- Doctorate degrees in Biotechnology and Strategic Planning.

In total, 12 out of 28 accreditable academic programs (taken by 58.91% of its student population) were certified as of good quality by the Mexican Undersecretariat of Higher Education (Subsecretaría de Educación Superior) by September 2007. In addition, from October 2006 to September 2007 the Institute invested MXP $11 million (around US$1 million) in research.
