= ProMéxico =

Agency overview
- Formed: June 13, 2007
- Headquarters: Mexico; 19.310799°N 99.218221°W
- Agency executive: Paulo Carreño King, Director General
- Parent department: Secretariat of Economy
- Website: www.promexico.gob.mx

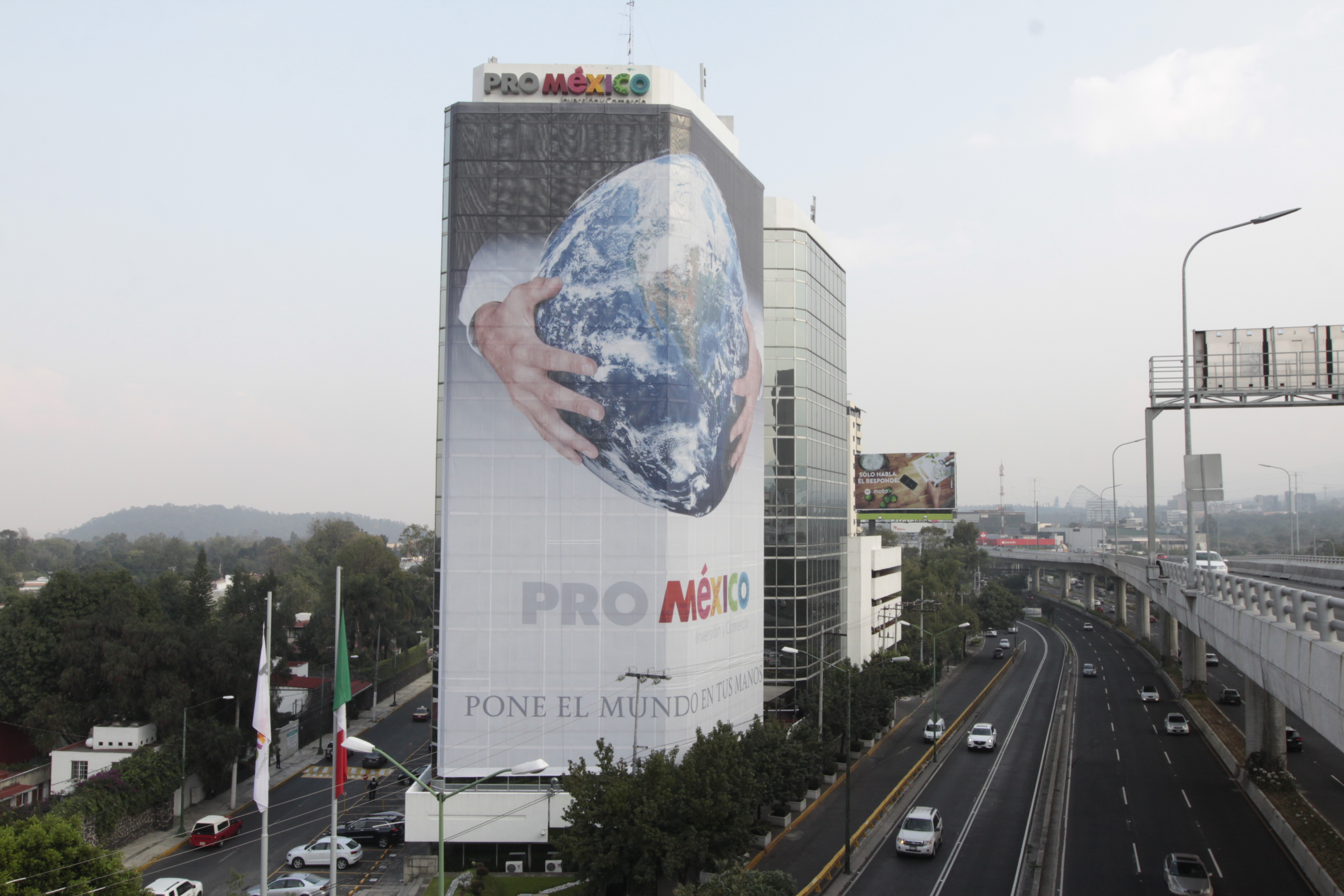
Headquarters

ProMéxico is a trust fund of the Federal government of Mexico —a subdivision of the Secretariat of Economy— that promoted international trade and investment. ProMéxico used to be in charge of the country's active participation in the international arena by firmly establishing Mexico as an attractive, safe and competitive destination for foreign investment; encouraging the exportation of national products and supporting the internationalization of Mexican companies; providing specialized advisory services to boost the export of products and services and increasing the presence of Mexican businesses abroad, and guiding the attraction of foreign direct investment (FDI) into the country.

ProMéxico had a network of 48 offices in 31 countries with sizeable economies that accounted for more than 70% of the world gross domestic product. In Mexico, 30 offices provided the public with a wide range of services and support.

== History ==
On June 1, 2007 the then President of Mexico, Felipe de Jesús Calderón Hinojosa, along with several federal secretaries, signed the decree ordering the establishment of ProMéxico as a “State-owned public trust fund,” for an initial term of fifty years, with the right to revoke its term at any time according to the applicable provisions. Representing the Presidency, Eduardo Sojo Garza Aldape—the Secretary of Economy at that time—inaugurated the XXIV National Convention of Retail Trade (XXIV Convención Nacional del Comercio Detallista) ANTAD 2007 and announced the creation of ProMéxico, “trade and investment, that will be the new window to open markets and promote foreign trade and investment.”

=== CEOs of ProMéxico ===
- 2007 to 2010: Bruno Ferrari
- 2010 to 2012: Carlos Guzmán
- 2012 to 2013: Ernesto de Lucas Hopkins
- 2013 to 2017: Francisco N. González Díaz
- 2017 to date: Paulo Carreño King

== Structure ==
ProMéxico has the following operational organizational structure:

- General Directorate
- Administration and Finance Unit (Unidad de administración y finanzas, UAF)
- Export Promotion Unit (Unidad de promoción de exportaciones, UPE)
- Institutional Support and Relations Unit (Unidad de apoyos y relaciones institucionales, UARI)
- Business Intelligence Unit (Unidad de inteligencia de negocios, UIN)
- Foreign Investment and Business Promotion Unit (Unidad de promoción de inversiones y negocios internacionales, UPINI)
- Advisors General Coordination (Coordinación general de asesores, CGA)
- Legal Affairs General Coordination (Coordinación general de asuntos jurídicos, CGAJ)
- Communication and Image General Coordination (Coordinación general de comunicación e imagen, CGCI)
- There are ProMéxico offices located throughout the world, usually within the regional Consulate General of Mexico. They are responsible for the business interests of Mexico within their region, including exporting from Mexico, foreign investment and many other forms of economic exchange. ProMéxico Vancouver for example has within its jurisdiction British Columbia, Alberta, Yukon and Alaska.

Offices exist in Latin America: Brazil, Chile, Colombia and Guatemala. North America: Houston, Los Angeles, Dallas, New York, Chicago and Miami in the United States, and Vancouver, Toronto and Montreal in Canada. Asia: Shanghai, Hong Kong, Japan, Korea, Beijing, Singapore, Taiwan, Mumbai and Dubai. Europe: United Kingdom, France, The Netherlands, Spain, Italy, Belgium, Germany, Switzerland and Sweden.

== Services and Business support ==
=== Services ===
- Business agenda
- Specialized advice on Mexico
- Trade fairs with national pavilion
- Promotion of exportable supply
- Media advertising
- Standardized market reports
- International business interns

=== Business support ===
- Support to international business interns
- Travel allowance
- Distribution centers, showrooms, and business centers in Mexico and abroad
- Consultancy on international brand registration
- Technical advice on production processes or new product development
- Design of international product image campaigns
- Design of packaging, packing, wrapping, and labeling of export products
- Design of advertising material for export promotion
- Shipping of samples abroad
- Study to identify and select new suppliers
- Logistics study
- Market studies to identify missing or weak links in supply chains
- Market studies and business plans for export or internationalization
- Studies for constituting export consortiums or other business association projects
- Implementation and certification of international export standards and requirements and supply management systems for exporters
- Organization and conducting of business matchmaking events
- Individual participation in international events
- Planning and conducting of promotional events abroad
- International business training projects

== Platforms ==
=== ProMéxico Global ===
ProMéxico Global is the most important trade and investment event in Mexico. To be held in eight different states around the country during 2014, the event features keynote speeches, business matchmaking, panels and workshops designed to promote and facilitate exports, the internationalization of Mexican companies and attract foreign direct investment. In addition, representatives from the main government agencies, business chambers, international bodies and universities will be available in the exhibition rooms.

=== Made in Mexico B2B ===
Made in Mexico B2B is an international promotion platform to facilitate the sales of Mexican products and services. It provides information on how to export, the necessary steps to do so, ProMéxico's support and services and the most important national and international business events and missions for business owners.

=== Mexico Investment Map (MIM) ===
The Mexico Investment Map was developed to give global companies and their investment project evaluators the facts about what makes Mexico an excellent choice for establishing their operations. It provides information about Mexico's infrastructure and production base across a large number of sectors and contains a database with information by state.

== See also ==
Secretariat of Economy
