= Soyopa =

Coordinates: 28.7667°N 109.633°W

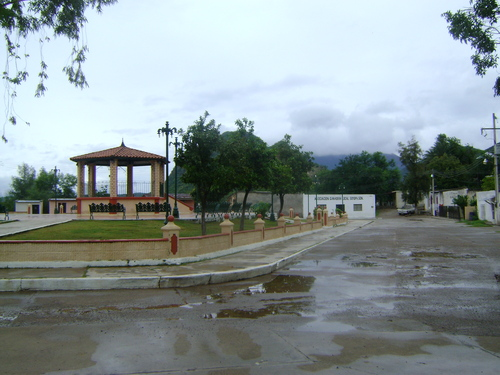
- Soyopa main square
- Interactive map of Soyopa
- Country: Mexico
- State: Sonora
- Municipality: Soyopa

Government
  - Mayor: Alonso Sánchez Encinas
- Time zone: UTC-7 (Pacific (US Mountain))

Soyopa (Yaqui: "hot land") is a town in Soyopa Municipality, in the eastern region of the Mexican state of Sonora. The elevation is 350 meters.

It was historically the location of the Jesuit mission San Joseph de Soyopa.

== Economy ==
The main economic activities are cattle raising (16,000 head in 2000), agriculture (rye, sorghum, wheat), and mining.

Silver was mined here beginning in the eighteenth century and the town had its economic heyday around 1880. After that the silver mines ran out and the population declined.
