= Alejandra López Noriega =

Mexican politician

- Born: 5 January 1970 (age 56); Hermosillo, Sonora, Mexico
- Education: Unison
- Occupation: Deputy
- Political party: PAN
- Website: http://www.alejandralopeznoriega.com/

Alejandra López Noriega (born 5 January 1970) is a Mexican politician affiliated with the National Action Party (PAN). She served as a federal deputy during the 62nd Congress (2012–2015) representing Sonora's third district. She had previously served as a local deputy in the 59th session of the Congress of Sonora.

López Noriega was born on 5 January 1970 in Hermosillo, Sonora. She earned her degree in industrial and systems engineering from the Universidad de Sonora in 1992.

She tested positive for COVID-19 in June 2020.
