= Rogelio Díaz Brown =

Mexican politician

- Born: 26 January 1980 (age 46); Ciudad Obregón, Sonora, Mexico
- Occupation: Politician
- Political party: PRI

Rogelio Manuel Díaz Brown Ramsburgh (born 26 January 1980) is a Mexican politician from the Institutional Revolutionary Party (PRI). From 2009 to 2012 he served as a federal deputy in the 61st session of Congress, representing Sonora's sixth district. He also served as municipal president of Cajeme from 2012 to 2015.

== See also ==
- List of municipal presidents of Cajeme
