= Eduardo Bours =

Mexican politician and businessman

José Eduardo Robinson Bours Castelo
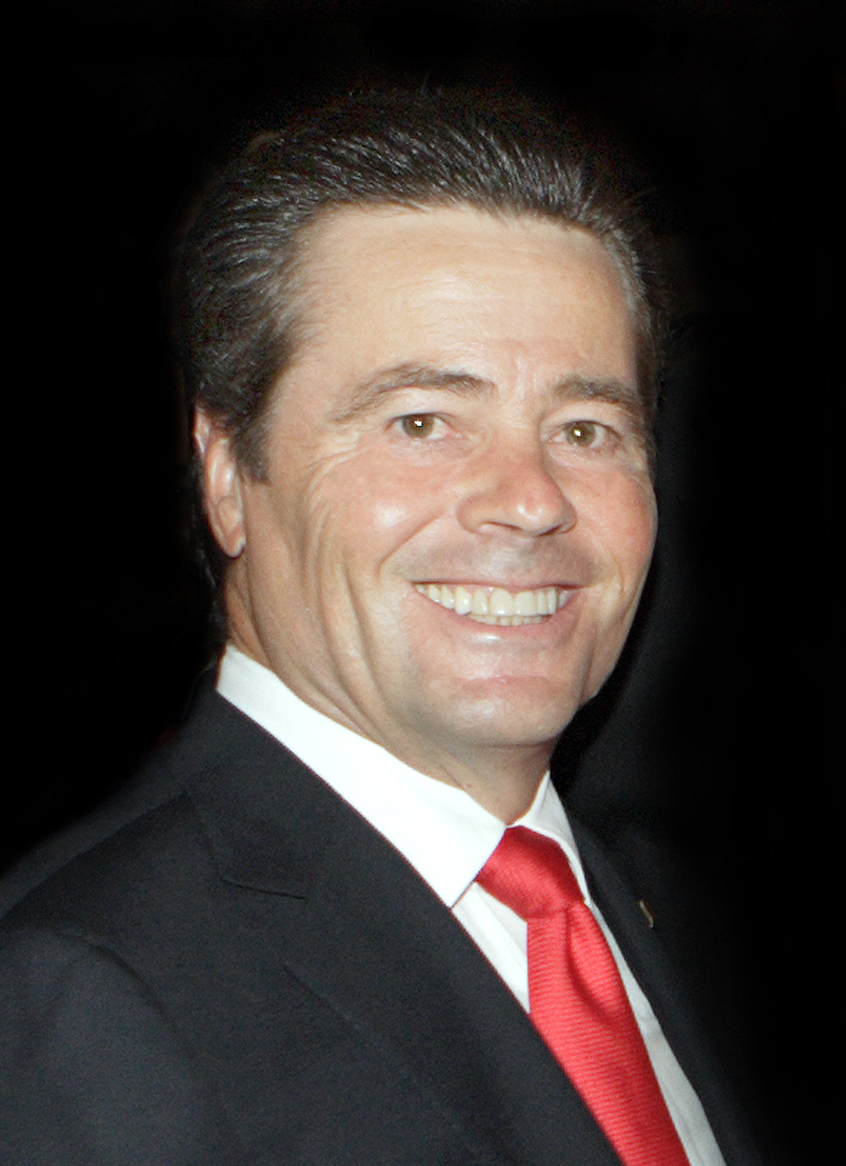

Governor of Sonora
- In office September 13, 2003 – September 12, 2009
- Preceded by: Armando López Nogales
- Succeeded by: Guillermo Padrés Elías

Personal details
- Born: December 17, 1956 (age 69) Ciudad Obregón, Sonora
- Party: Institutional Revolutionary Party
- Education: Monterrey Institute of Technology and Higher Education
- Profession: Industrial Engineer

José Eduardo Robinson Bours Castelo (born December 17, 1956) is a Mexican businessman who served as governor of Sonora under the Institutional Revolutionary Party, PRI. He is a member of the Robinson Bours family which immigrated from the United States in the 19th century. Before being elected governor, he served as Senator representing his state in the Mexican Senate. In 2000, he won the primary election with 51% of the votes. Later he was elected Governor of his state in July 2003. His term ended in 2009 without the possibility of reelection.

== Biography ==
Bours is the son of Javier Robinson Bours Almada and his wife, Alma Castelo Valenzuela. Javier Robinson Bours Almada was a prominent Mexican businessman who was also Mayor of Cajeme from 1967 to 1970. Bours is the nephew of Enrique Robinson Bours Almada, a businessman and member of the Mexican Council of Businessmen. Two of Bours' brothers are Francisco Javier Robinson Bours Castelo (president of the company Bachoco) and Ricardo Robinson Bours Castelo (Mayor of Cajeme, 2000–2003). Bours is also the grandson of Alfonso Robinson Bours Monteverde. He is married to Lourdes Laborín Gómez.

On May 22, 2019, the Instituto Mexicano del Seguro Social (IMSS) sued former governor Bours for negligence in the investigation of the fire at the 2009 Hermosillo daycare center fire that killed 44 toddlers.

== Professional activity ==
Bours has occupied various positions in the private sector. From 1980 to 1992 he was director of the poultry company Bachoco. Due to his experience at Bachoco, he was chosen to represent the private sector in negotiations regarding agriculture for the North American Free Trade Agreement (NAFTA).

== Political activity ==
In March 2000, Bours was nominated by the PRI as a candidate for the Senate of the Republic (Mexico), to which he was elected in July of that year. As senator, Bours chaired the Commission for Economic Growth, served as secretary of the Commission of Exterior Relations for Europe and Africa. He pushed for government support for cooperative businesses and development in rural areas, and promoted citizen participation in the legislative process. In 2003, Bours successfully ran for governor of Sonora, and became the 70th governor of the state.

== See also ==
- List of Mexican state governors
- List of municipal presidents of Cajeme
