= Congress of Sonora =

Legislature of Sonora, Mexico

Honorable Congress of the State of Sonora Honorable Congreso del Estado de Sonora
- LXIV Legislature

Type
- Type: Unicameral

History
- Founded: September 12, 1824

Leadership
- President: María Eduwiges Espinoza Tapia, Morena
- Vice President: Azalia Guevara Espinoza, PVEM
- 1st Secretary: René Edmundo García Rojo, PT
- 2nd Secretary: María Karina Olivares Rábago, PES
- Substitute Secretary: Raúl González De La Vega, Independent

Structure
- Seats: 33
- Political groups: Morena (11) PT (4) PVEM (4) PANAL (3) PES (3) Independent (2) MC (2) PRI (2) PAN (1) PRD (1)

Elections
- Voting system: First-past-the-post for 21 electoral district seats and Mixed-member proportional representation for 12 proportional representation seats
- Last election: 2 June 2024
- Next election: 2027

Meeting place
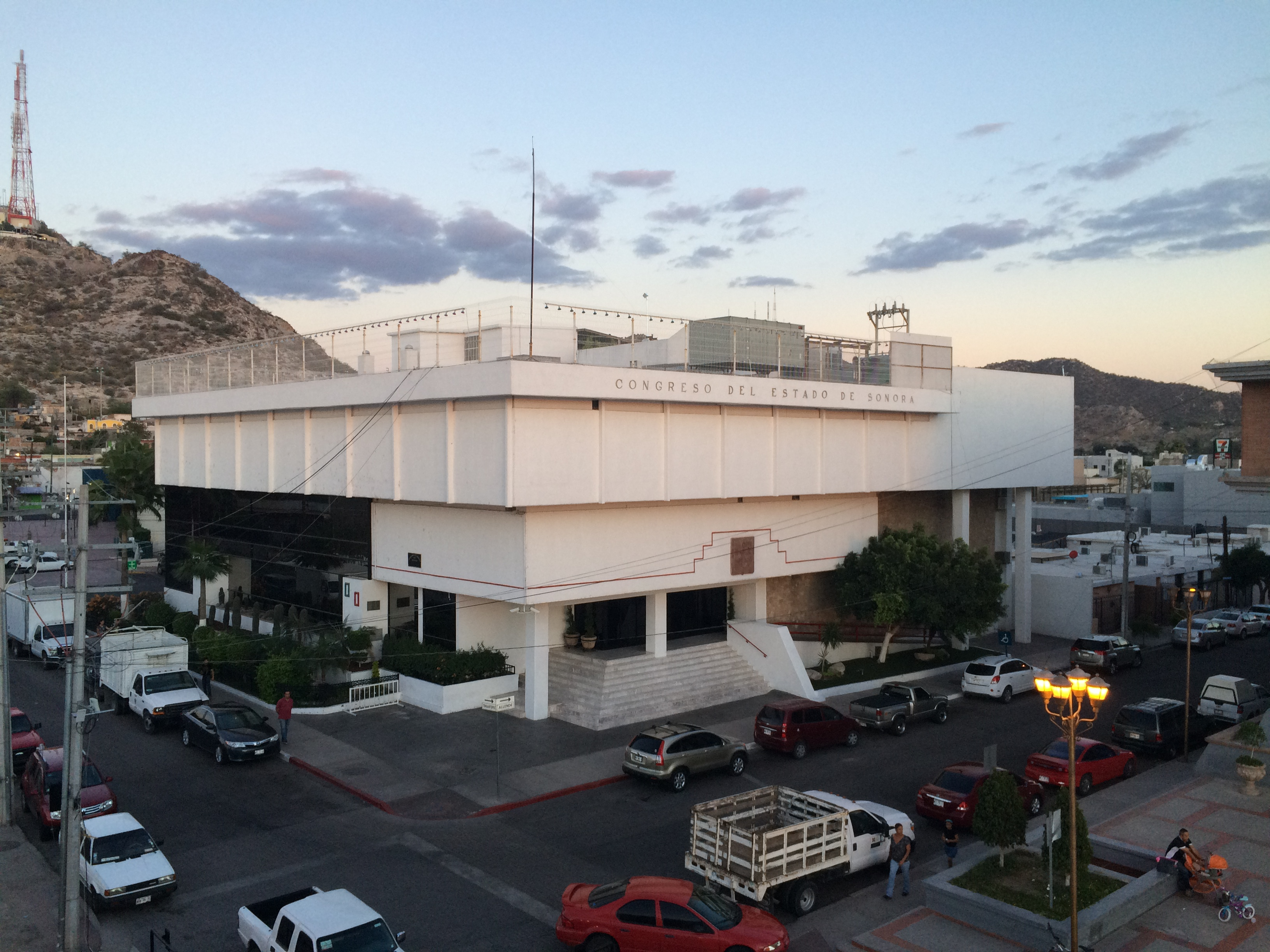
- Legislative Palace; Hermosillo, Sonora, Mexico

Website
- Honorable Congress of the State of Sonora

The Honorable Congress of the State of Sonora (Spanish: Honorable Congreso del Estado de Sonora) is the legislative branch of the government of the Mexican state of Sonora. The Congress is the governmental deliberative body of Sonora, which is equal to, and independent of, the executive.

The Congress is unicameral and consists of 33 deputies. 21 deputies are elected on a first-past-the-post basis, one for each district in which the entity is divided, while 12 are elected through a system of proportional representation. Deputies are elected to serve for a three-year term.

Since its installation the congress has been renewed 63 times, hence the current session of the Congress of Sonora (whose term lasts from 2021 to 2024) is known as the LXIII Legislature.

== Electoral districts of Sonora ==
Electoral District	Geographical Area	Electoral District	Geographical Area
District I	San Luis Río Colorado	District XII	South Hermosillo
District II	Puerto Peñasco	District XIII	Guaymas
District III	Caborca	District XIV	Empalme
District IV	North Nogales	District XV	South Ciudad Obregón
District V	South Nogales	District XVI	Southeast Ciudad Obregón
District VI	Cananea	District XVII	Central Ciudad Obregón
District VII	Agua Prieta	District XVIII	North Ciudad Obregón
District VIII	Northwest Hermosillo	District XIX	North Navojoa
District IX	Central Hermosillo	District XX	Etchojoa
District X	Northeast Hermosillo	District XXI	Huatabampo
District XI	Hermosillo Coast		

== Legislatures of Sonora ==
Legislature Number	Period	Legislature Number	Period	Legislature Number	Period	Legislature Number	Period
I Legislature	1861-1863	XVI Legislature	1897-1899	XXXIII Legislature	1935	XLIX Legislature	1979–1982
II Legislature	1863-1864	XVII Legislature	1899-1901	XXXIII bis Legislature	1936-1937	L Legislature	1982–1985
III Legislature	1867-1869	XVIII Legislature	1901-1903	XXXIV Legislature	1937-1939	LI Legislature	1985–1988
IV Legislature	1869-1871	XIX Legislature	1903-1905	XXXV Legislature	1939-1941	LII Legislature	1988–1991
V Legislature	1871-1873	XX Legislature	1905-1907	XXXVI Legislature	1941-1943	LIII Legislature	1991–1994
VI Legislature	1873-1875	XXI Legislature	1907-1909	XXXVII Legislature	1943-1946	LIV Legislature	1994–1997
VII Legislature	1875-1876	XXII Legislature	1909-1911	XXXVIII Legislature	1946-1949	LV Legislature	1997–2000
VII Legislature	1877-1879	XXIII Legislature	1911-1913	XXXIX Legislature	1949-1952	LVI Legislature	2000–2003
VII Legislature	1879-1881	XXIV Legislature	1917-1919	XL Legislature	1952-1955	LVII Legislature	2003–2006
VIII Legislature	1881-1883	XXV Legislature	1919-1921	XLI Legislature	1955-1958	LVIII Legislature	2006–2009
IX Legislature	1883-1885	XXVI Legislature	1921-1923	XLII Legislature	1958-1961	LIX Legislature	2009–2012
X Legislature	1885-1887	XXVII Legislature	1923-1925	XLIII Legislature	1961-1964	LX Legislature	2012–2015
XI Legislature	1887-1889	XXVIII Legislature	1925-1927	XLIV Legislature	1964-1967	LXI Legislature	2015–2018
XII Legislature	1889-1891	XXIX Legislature	1927-1929	XLV Legislature	1967-1970	LXII Legislature	2018–2021
XIII Legislature	1891-1893	XXX Legislature	1929-1931	XLVI Legislature	1970-1973	LXIII Legislature	2021–2024
XIV Legislature	1893-1895	XXXI Legislature	1931-1933	XLVII Legislature	1973-1976	LXIV Legislature	2024-2027
XV Legislature	1895-1897	XXXII Legislature	1933-1935	XLVIII Legislature	1976-1979		

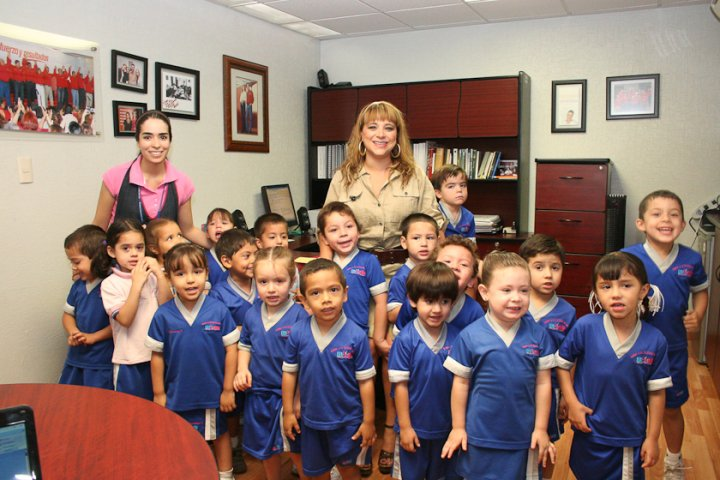
Sonora State Deputy Flor Ayala with children visiting her office

== History ==
Since 1917 the Congress has been composed as follows:

- From 1917 to 1931 it was composed of 15 deputies.
- From 1931 to 1970 it was composed of 9 deputies.
- From 1970 to 1979 it was composed of 11 deputies.
- From 1979 to 1982 it was composed of 19 deputies (15 elected by the first-past-the-post (FPP) system and 4 by the proportional representation system (PR).
- From 1982 to 1988 it was composed of 24 deputies (18 elected by the FPP system and 6 by the PR system).
- From 1988 to 1994 it was composed of 27 deputies (18 elected by the FPP system and 9 by the PR system.
- Since 1994 the Congress is composed of 33 deputies (21 elected by the FPP system and 12 by the PR system.
- The LVII Legislature (2003–2006) was composed of 31 deputies.
- The current session is composed of 33 deputies (21 elected by the FPP system and 12 by the PR system.

María Jesús Guirado Ibarra was elected the first female member of the Congress of Sonora in 1955, which was the first election after the passage of women's suffrage in Mexico. The LXIII Legislature, elected in 2021, became the first women-majority legislature in state history.

== See also ==
- List of Mexican state congresses
