= Mary B. Moser =

American linguist

Mary Margaret Beck Moser (October 12, 1924 – January 12, 2013) was an American field linguist and Bible translator who worked on behalf of the Seri people of Mexico for more than fifty years. She authored and co-authored numerous articles and two books (an ethnobotany and a substantive trilingual dictionary) about the language and culture of that group and brought to completion the translation of the New Testament in the Seri language.

== Life and career ==
Daughter of Robert and Vila Mae Beck, Mary Margaret was born on October 12, 1924, in Lock Haven, Pennsylvania. The name by which people later knew her best, Becky, was also the nickname that her father used. She graduated from high school in Williamsport, Pennsylvania and attended Wheaton College (Illinois) for two years and then taught first grade on a War Emergency Certificate. She met her future husband, Edward W. Moser during her first year of college. They married in 1946, after Edward finished his service in the United States Navy. Both of them studied how to analyze an unwritten language at the Summer Institute of Linguistics at the University of Oklahoma. It was there that they learned about the Seri people of Sonora, Mexico, and made the decision to dedicate their lives to serve them. They became members of Wycliffe Bible Translators in 1950.

The Mosers took up residence in the Seri area on the Gulf of California in 1951. A major effort in the early years was to learn the Seri language well and understand the culture, but the Mosers also helped in various ways to deal with a measles epidemic and other medical and physical needs. Mary helped deliver more than thirty Seri babies during the years before Seri women began using the hospital in Hermosillo, the state capital. When the Mosers first arrived, the Seri population was about 230. During the time that the Mosers lived with the Seri people, the population of the Seri people reversed its downward trend and the total population began to increase.

Although the Mosers thought that they could not have children, their family grew when in 1952 a daughter (Cathy) was born.

Mary and Edward lived in the only house that they would ever own, a three-room adobe house that was later slightly enlarged, in the Seri village of Haxöl Iihom (later known as El Desemboque). During almost all of the years of use, the house did not have electricity or running water. But the house was a mecca for visitors to the area since scientists, government personnel, artists, and tourists alike always found a welcome there, especially to have a good meal and to use the bucket-shower in the corner of the kitchen and the adobe outhouse furnished with reading material and art exhibit.

Together Edward and Mary learned the Seri language and did the first serious analysis of its sound system and grammar (see the bibliography below). Working in close collaboration with community members and under the guidelines of the Secretaría de Educación Pública (Mexico's department of education), they prepared the first materials to be used to teach Seri children and adults how to read and write their language. They did meticulous documentation of the culture during the years between 1951 and 1976 while at the same time preparing a translation of the New Testament into the language.

Edward's unexpected and premature death in 1976 put the job of finishing various projects, including the translation, into Mary's hands. The New Testament was published in 1982. She completed an Old Testament summary in 1986. During these years a primary co-worker was Roberto Herrera Marcos, a prominent member of the Seri community.

During her years of residence in the Seri community, Mary took special interest in the lives of the people. She published articles on various anthropological and linguistic topics. She and Richard S. Felger, a botanist from Arizona, collaborated for more than twenty years to produce the Seri ethnobotany, People of the Desert and Sea, considered a classic today for the depth and breadth of its investigation into the use of plants by a single ethnic group. Later publications focused on grammar, songs, and lexicon. Mary's last paper publication was the Seri dictionary (Moser & Marlett 2010), which brought together the lexical information on the Seri language that had been filed on 3x5 paper slips during the previous fifty years.

Mary was an adjunct phonetics instructor at the SIL linguistics program at the University of North Dakota for most years between 1952 and 1999. In 1982 she received her B.A. in social sciences and linguistics from the University of North Dakota.

== Bibliography of Mary B. Moser ==
As sole author:

- Moser, Mary B. 1964. "Seri blue." Kiva 30: 3–8.
- Moser, Mary B. 1970. "Seri elevated burials." Kiva 35: 211–16.
- Moser, Mary B. 1970. "Seri: From conception through infancy." Kiva 35: 201–10.
- Moser, Mary B. 1978. "Switch reference in Seri." International Journal of American Linguistics 44: 113–20.
- Moser Mary B. (1982) "Seri: From conception through infancy." In Anthropology of human birth, ed. Margarita A. Kay. Philadelphia: F.A. Davis, pp. 221–232.
- Moser, Mary B. 1988. "Seri history (1904): Two documents." Journal of the Southwest 30: 469–501.

As co-author:

- Bowen, Thomas & Mary B. Moser. 1995. "Seri." In James W. Dow (ed.) & Robert V. Kemper (assoc. ed.), Middle America and the Caribbean, 232–235, Volume 8 of David Levinson (editor in chief), Encyclopedia of world cultures. Boston: G. K. Hall.
- Felger, Richard S. & Mary B. Moser. 1970. "Seri use of agave (century plant)." Kiva 35: 159–67.
- Felger, Richard S. & Mary B. Moser. 1971. "Seri use of mesquite Prosopis glandulosa var torreyana." Kiva 37: 53–60.
- Felger, Richard S. & Mary B. Moser. 1973. "Eelgrass (Zostera marina L.) in the Gulf of California: Discovery of its nutritional value by the Seri Indians." Science 181: 355–56.
- Felger, Richard S. & Mary B. Moser. 1974. "Columnar cacti in Seri Indian culture." Kiva 39: 257–75.
- Felger, Richard S. & Mary B. Moser. 1974. "Seri Indian pharmacopoeia." Economic Botany 28: 414–36.
- Felger, Richard S. & Mary B. Moser. 1976. "Seri Indian food plants: Desert subsistence without agriculture." In Ecology of Food and Nutrition 5, 13-27: Gordon and Breach Science Publishers Ltd.
- Felger, Richard S. & Mary B. Moser. 1985. People of the desert and sea: Ethnobotany of the Seri Indians. Tucson: University of Arizona
- Felger, Richard S., Mary B. Moser, & Edward Moser. 1980. "Seagrasses in Seri Indian culture." In Ronald C. Phillips & C. Peter McRoy (eds.), Handbook of seagrass biology: An ecosystem perspective, 260–76. New York: Garland STPM Press.
- Marlett, Stephen A. & Mary B. Moser. 2002. Presentación y análisis preliminar de 600 topónimos seris [Presentation and preliminary analysis of 600 Seri toponyms]. Mexico, D.F.: Summer Institute of Linguistics.
- Moser, Edward & Mary B. Moser. 1961. Seri-castellano castellano-seri. Serie de vocabularios indígenas "Mariano Silva y Aceves", 5. Mexico: Instituto Lingüístico de Verano
- Moser, Edward & Mary B. Moser. 1965. "Consonant-vowel balance in Seri (Hokan) syllables." Linguistics 16: 50–67.
- Moser, Mary B. & Stephen A. Marlett. 1989. "Terminologia de parentesco seri." Anales de Antropología 26: 367–88.
- Moser, Mary B. & Stephen A. Marlett. 1992. "El desarrollo de clases nominales en seri." In Gerardo López C. & José Luis Moctezuma Z. (eds.), Estudios de Lingüística y Sociolingüística, 97–105. Hermosillo, Mexico: Universidad de Sonora and Instituto Nacional de Antropología e Historia.
- Moser, Mary B. & Stephen A. Marlett. 1994. "Los números en seri." In Zarina Estrada Fernández (ed.), Encuentro de Lingüística en el Noroeste, Memorias 2, 63–79. Hermosillo, Mexico: Universidad de Sonora, Departamento de letras y lingüística, División de humanidades y bellas artes.
- Moser, Mary B. & Stephen A. Marlett. 1996. Seri de Sonora. Archivo de Lenguas Indígenas de México. Mexico: El Colegio de México.
- Moser, Mary B. & Stephen A. Marlett. 1998. "How Rabbit fooled Puma: a Seri text." In Leanne Hinton & Pamela Munro (eds.), Studies in American Indian languages: Description and theory, 117–29. University of California Publications in Linguistics, 131. Berkeley and Los Angeles: University of California Press.
- Moser, Mary B. & Stephen A. Marlett, compilers. 2005. Comcáac quih yaza quih hant ihíip hac: cmiique iitom - cocsar iitom - maricáana iitom (Diccionario Seri - Español - Inglés: con índices Español - Seri, Inglés - Seri y con gramática). Hermosillo & Mexico, D.F.: Universidad de Sonora & Plaza y Valdes Editores.
- Moser, Mary B. & Stephen A. Marlett, compilers. 2010. Comcaac quih yaza quih hant ihiip hac: cmiique iitom - cocsar iitom - maricaana iitom (Diccionario Seri - Español - Inglés: con índices Español - Seri, Inglés - Seri y con gramática). 2nd edition. Hermosillo & Mexico, D.F.: Universidad de Sonora & Plaza y Valdes Editores. Electronic version
- Moser, Mary B. & Stephen A. Marlett (compilers). 2006. Seri texts; Textos seris

Unlisted as editor or major consultant:

- Herrera T., Roberto; Jesús Morales and Juan Topete. 1976. Zix anxö cóohhiit hapáh quih czáxö zix quihmáa táax mos czaxöiha (El gigante llamado comelón y otras historias). México: Instituto Lingüístico de Verano.
- Primera cartilla seri. 1963. México: Instituto Lingüístico de Verano. [A total of four primers were published, first in trial editions in 1959; they were reprinted at various dates.]
- Romero, Chico et al. 1975. Zix ctám barríil hapáh cuitzaxö, zix quihmáa táax mos czáxöiha (El hombre llamado barril y otras historias). México: Instituto Lingüístico de Verano.
- Yooz quij ziix quih yacoaat quih hant com iti yaahcaii taax pac czaxöiha; Historias del antiguo testamento. 1986. México, D.F. Liga del Sembrador.
- Ziix quih icaamx quih cmaa quiih quih Cristo quij itoon hant com cöoomjc ac; El nuevo testamento en seri de Sonora. 1982. México, D.F. Liga del Sembrador.
