= Sonora State Highway 100 =

State Highway 100
- Carretera estatal 100

Major junctions
- From: Hermosillo
- To: El Desemboque

Location
- Country: Mexico
- State: Sonora

Highway system
- Mexican Federal Highways; List; Autopistas; State Highways in Sonora

Sonora State Highway 100 (Carretera Estatal 100) is a highway in the center of the Mexican state of Sonora.

It runs from Hermosillo to El Desemboque, connecting also the beach town of Bahía de Kino.
