= Punta Chueca =

Town in Sonora, Mexico

Coordinates: 29°0′54″N 112°9′42″W

Punta Chueca (Seri: Socaaix) is a Seri town located on the Gulf of California in the Mexican state of Sonora. It is located 25 kilometers north of the fishing and tourist town of Bahía de Kino. Both of these towns are part of the Municipality of Hermosillo. One of the two villages on the Seri Indian communal property (the other being El Desemboque (Haxöl Iihom)), it has small stores, a primary school and a small satellite-fed secondary school (telesecundaria). It is one of the closest points on the mainland to Tiburón Island, separated from it by the Canal del Infiernillo (Xepe Coosot). According to the Mexican census of 2010, the town (officially a locality, or localidad), had a population of 520 inhabitants.

== Gallery ==
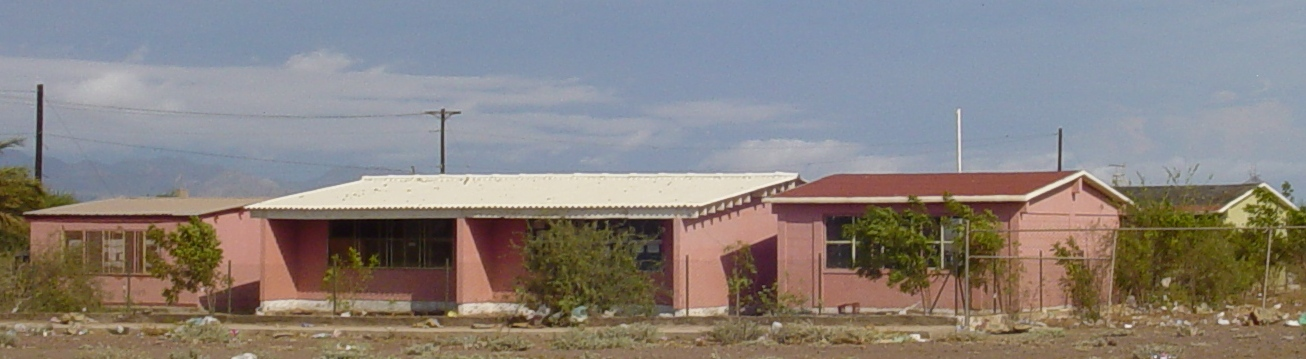
Primary school in Punta Chueca

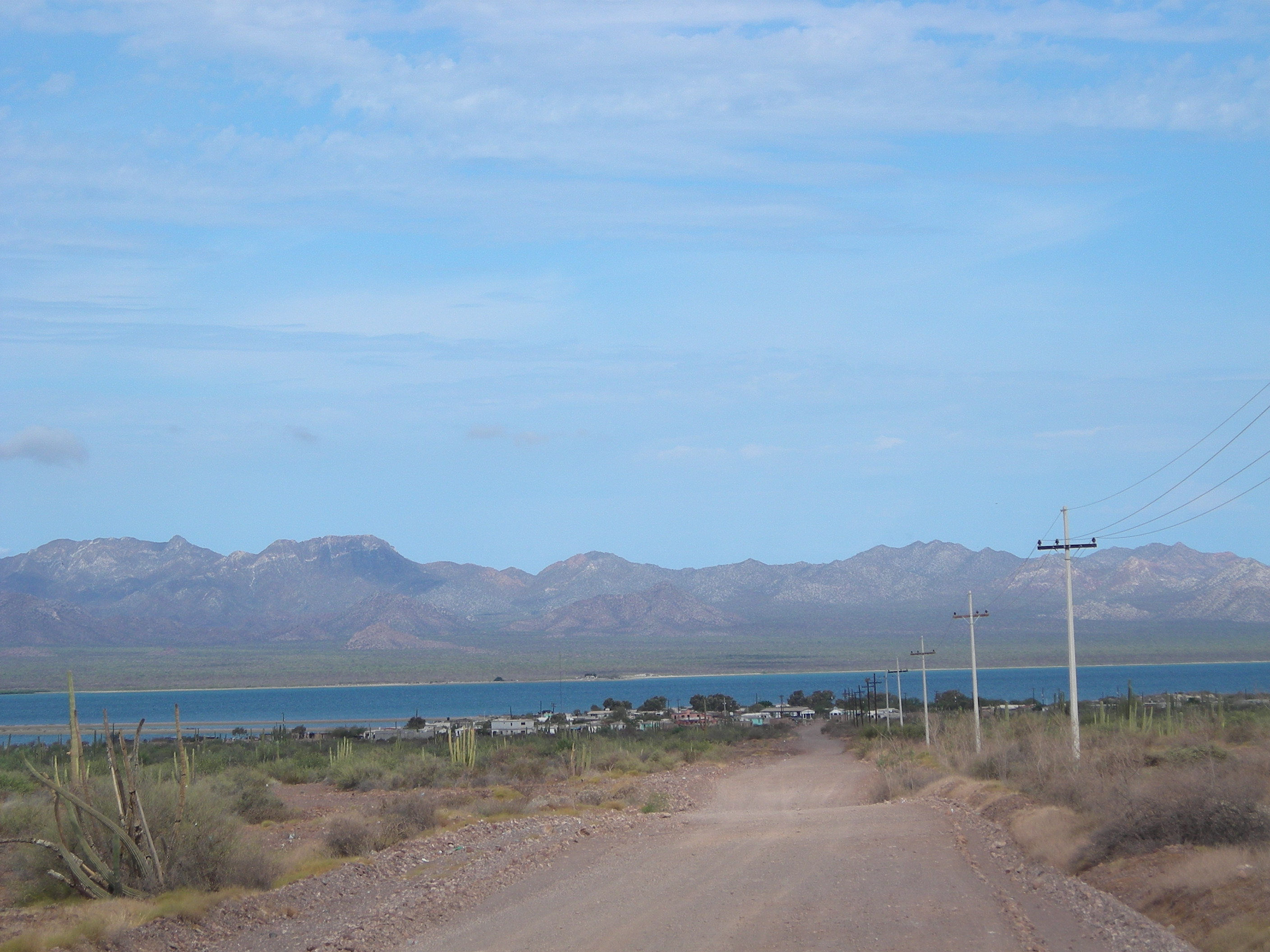
Socaaix (Punta Chueca) with Tiburon Island in the background

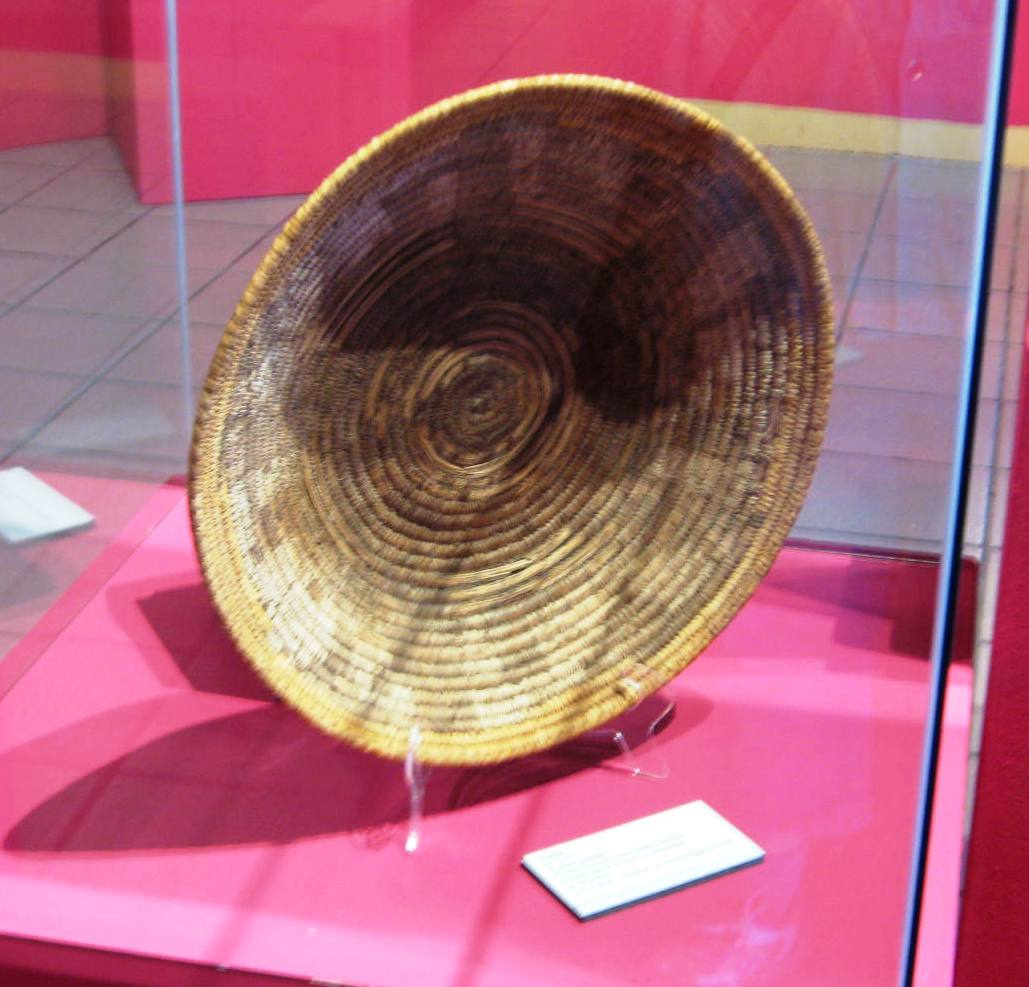
"Corita" basket from Punta Chueca on display at the UABC cultural museum in Mexicali
