= Edward W. Moser =

American linguist

Edward W. Moser (1924–1976) was an American linguist and expert in the Seri language and culture working with the Summer institute of Linguistics.

== Life and career ==
He was born in 1924 in Joliet, Illinois. Son of a Baptist minister, he lived in various communities in Illinois, Indiana, Iowa and New York State. During World War II he served as an ensign in the U.S. Navy in the Pacific theater. In 1946 he married Mary Beck (better known later as Becky) and in 1948 completed his B.A. degree in history at Wheaton College (Illinois). Becky and Edward studied descriptive linguistics at the Summer Institute of Linguistics program at the University of Oklahoma. In 1951 they went to live in the Mexican state of Sonora to live with the Seri people and learn the Seri language under the auspices of the Summer Institute of Linguistics.

They built a small three room adobe house in the Seri fishing camp called Haxöl Iihom; the camp eventually became known in Spanish as El Desemboque. This house served as their residence during the next twenty-five years. Two more small rooms and a small office were added ten years after the birth of their daughter Cathy. The home was frequently visited by scientists studying in the area.

The Mosers worked with others to help fight an early measles epidemic by distributing gamma globulin, provided emergency medical help and transportation to the hospital (90 miles away by dirt road to the Sonora state capital, Hermosillo) in the years before a government clinic was set up in Haxöl Iihom, helped provide water to the village, and helped the people in numerous other ways. During these years the Seri population began to rebound, increasing from about 215 in 1951 to more than 800 by 2005.

== Contributions to the study of Seri language and culture ==
Edward and Becky learned the Seri language and did the first scientific analysis of its phonology, morphology and grammar. A major collaborator with them on their work at that time was Roberto Herrera Marcos, a Seri man who also resided in Haxöl Iihom. Their earliest publications were Seri reading primers that were published by SIL in cooperation with the Secretaría de Educación Pública after developing the first alphabet for the language under the guidelines of that Mexican ministry. Later work produced books of traditional Seri stories.

During their years of residence, the Mosers collected extensive lexical and cultural information, much of which would be published later in various books and articles. Recorded legends and history were published in the Seri language, and some appear in later collections in English and Spanish. A Seri-Spanish vocabulary book was published in 1961, an ethnobotany (with botanist Richard S. Felger) in 1985 (which has been hailed as a modern classic), and a major dictionary in 2005, thirty years after Edward's death, but based largely on work that he and Roberto Herrera Marcos (a.k.a. Roberto Herrera Thomson) had done. What is known today about Seri history and culture, including the so-called “band” structure of this group, is the result of work that the Mosers and Herrera did. Even work that does not bear either of their names as authors, such as the article in the journal Science about hibernating sea turtles, the book about the San Esteban people, and the 2005 dictionary, as well as most work on the Seri language and culture during the past half century is part of their legacy.

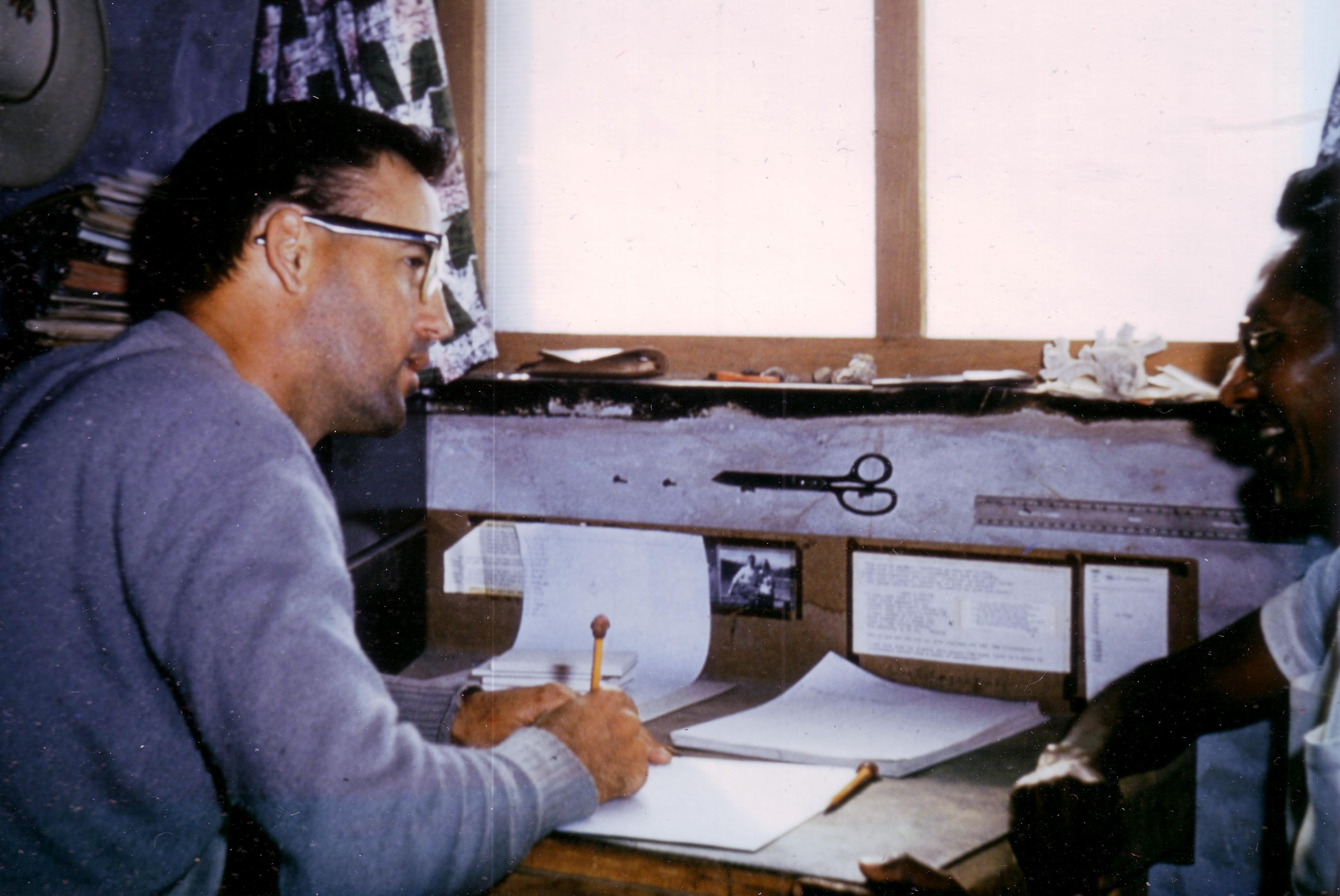
Edward Moser and Roberto Herrera Marcos at work in the late 1950s

The Mosers and Herrera also worked on a translation of the New Testament which was also completed in 1982, a few years after Edward's death.

Edward completed a master's degree in linguistics at the University of Pennsylvania in 1966. Edward and Becky spent many summers (more than twenty for Edward, more than forty for Becky) at the University of North Dakota giving linguistics courses through the Summer Institute of Linguistics program.

Edward's interest in the well-being of the Seri people and in their rich culture and history was unflagging up until his sudden and unexpected death in 1976. At about that same time, a Mexican government-sponsored building project in Haxöl Iihom laid out the first streets, and the street in front of Mosers’ home was called Calle Eduardo Moser, a name which it still bears today.

== Bibliography of Edward W. Moser ==
- Bowen, Thomas and Edward W. Moser. 1968. Seri pottery. The Kiva 33: 89-132.
- Bowen, Thomas and Edward W. Moser. 1970. Material and functional aspects of Seri instrumental music. The Kiva 35: 178–200.
- Bowen, Thomas and Edward W. Moser. 1970. Seri headpieces and hats. The Kiva 35: 168–77.
- Felger, Richard S., Mary B. Moser and Edward W. Moser. 1980. Seagrasses in Seri Indian culture. Handbook of seagrass biology: An ecosystem perspective, pp. 260–76. New York: Garland STPM Press.
- Felger, Richard S., Mary Beck Moser, and Edward W. Moser. 1981. The desert tortoise in Seri Indian culture. The Desert Tortoise Council: Proceedings of the 1981 Symposium. pp. 113–20.
- Herrera T., Roberto; Jesús Morales and Juan Topete. 1976. Zix anxö cóohhiit hapáh quih czáxö zix quihmáa táax mos czaxöiha (El gigante llamado comelón y otras historias). México: Instituto Lingüístico de Verano. [Mosers were the unlisted editors.]
- Moser, Edward W. 1961. Number in Seri verbs. M.A. thesis, University of Pennsylvania.
- Moser, Edward W. 1962. The two brothers who went away angry: A Seri legend. Tlalocan 4: 157–60.
- Moser, Edward W. 1963. Seri bands. The Kiva 28.3: 14–27. [Updated version in Spanish is on-line: http://www.sil.org/americas/mexico/seri/A004-BandasSeris-SEI.pdf.]
- Moser, Edward W. 1968. Two Seri myths. Tlalocan 5: 364–67.
- Moser, Edward W. 1996. Los seris. [Online: http://www.sil.org/mexico/seri/A003i-People-SEI.htm]
- Moser, Edward W. 1969. Cuaam coop (La tejedora de canastas). México: Instituto Lingüístico de Verano.
- Moser, Edward W. and Mary B. Moser. 1955. Abecedario seri. México: Instituto Lingüístico de Verano.
- Moser, Edward W. and Mary B. Moser. 1956. Los números en seri. México: Instituto Lingüístico de Verano.
- Moser, Edward W. and Mary B. Moser. 1961. Vocabulario seri: seri-castellano, castellano-seri. México, D.F.: Insituto Lingüístico de Verano.
- Moser, Edward W. and Mary B. Moser. 1964. Hablemos español (Cocsar íitong quih cöscóoza). México: Instituto Lingüístico de Verano.
- Moser, Edward W. and Mary B. Moser. 1965. Consonant-vowel balance in Seri (Hokan) syllables. Linguistics 16: 50–67.
- Moser, Edward W. and Mary B. Moser. 1976. Seri noun pluralization classes. Hokan Studies, eds. Margaret Langdon and Shirley Silver. The Hague: Mouton, 285–96.
- Moser, Edward W. and Richard S. White. 1968. Seri clay figurines. The Kiva 33: 133–54.
- Moser, Edward W. 1973. Seri basketry. The Kiva 38: 105–40.
- Primera cartilla seri. 1963. México: Instituto Lingüístico de Verano. [A total of four primers were published, first in trial editions in 1959; they were reprinted at various dates; Mosers were the unlisted editors.]
- Romero, Chico et al. 1975. Zix ctám barríil hapáh cuitzaxö, zix quihmáa táax mos czáxöiha (El hombre llamado barril y otras historias). México: Instituto Lingüístico de Verano. [Mosers were the unlisted editors.]
- Ziix quih icaamx quih cmaa quiih quih Cristo quij itoon hant com cöoomjc ac; El nuevo testamento en seri de Sonora. 1982. México, D.F. Liga del Sembrador.
