= Seri language =

Native American language of Mexico

Seri
- cmiique iitom
- Pronunciation: [kw̃ĩːkɛˈiːtom]
- Region: Sonora, Mexico
- Ethnicity: Seri
- Native speakers: 720 (2020 census)
- Language family: Hokan?: Seri

Language codes
- ISO 639-3: sei
- Glottolog: seri1257
- ELP: Seri
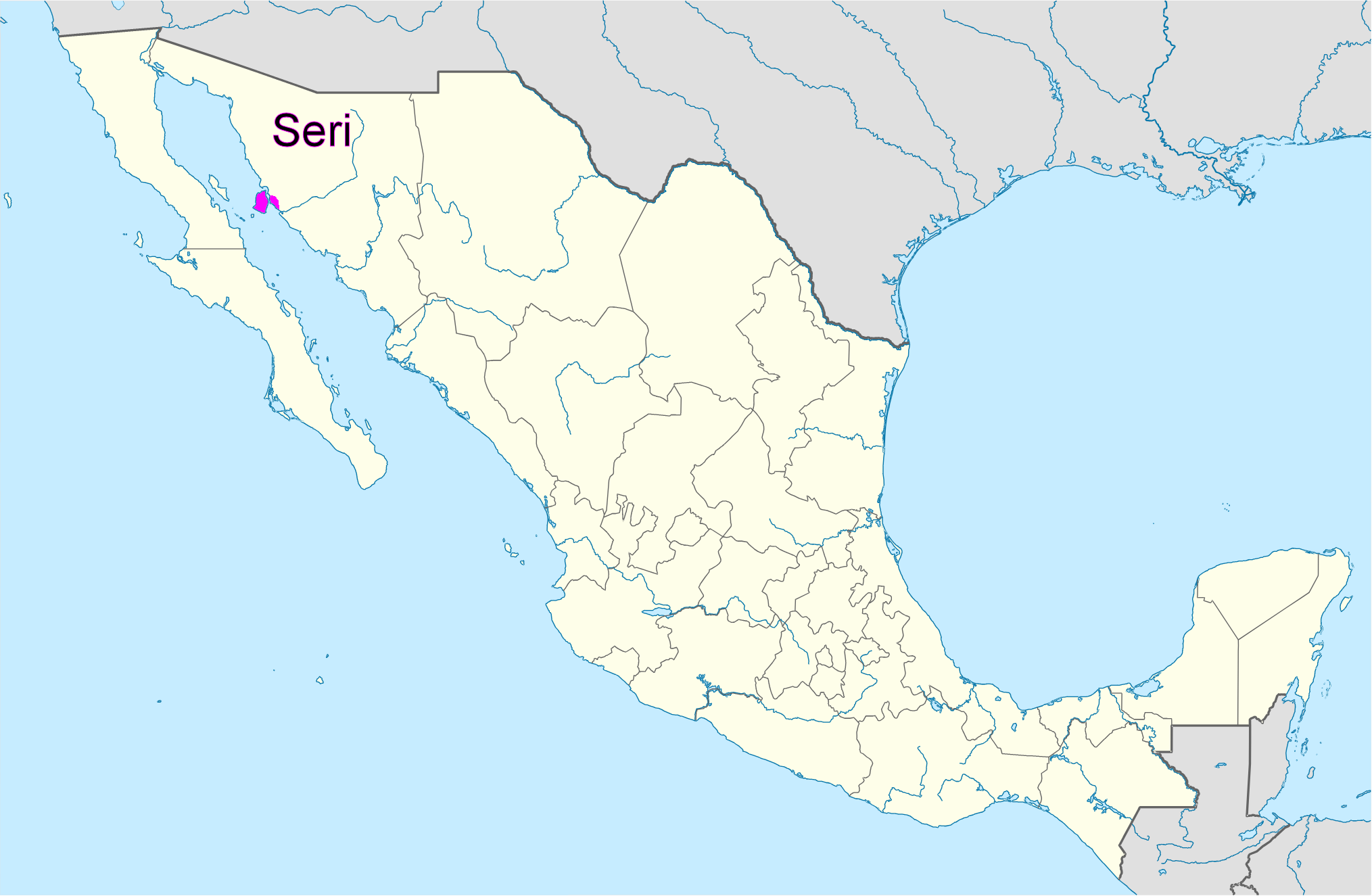

- Seri is classified as Vulnerable by the UNESCO Atlas of the World's Languages in Danger.

Seri (Seri: cmiique iitom) is an indigenous language spoken by between 716 and 900 Seri people in Punta Chueca and El Desemboque, two villages on the coast of Sonora, Mexico. The language is generally considered a language isolate, but attempts have been made to include it in the theoretical Hokan language family. No concrete evidence has been found for connections to other languages.

The earliest records of the Seri language are from 1692, but the population has remained fairly isolated. Extensive work on Seri began in 1951 by Edward and Mary Beck Moser with the Summer Institute of Linguistics.

The language is viable within its community and is used freely in daily life. Exceptions include primary and secondary school, some parts of local church services, and communications with Spanish speakers outside of the Seri community. Most members of the community, including youth, are fluent in their language, but the population of speakers is small and cultural knowledge has been dwindling since the traditional hunter-gatherer lifestyle was essentially replaced in the 1930s by fixed settlements. Furthermore, many children are no longer becoming fluent in the language, for a variety of reasons (schools, internet, or non-Seri friends); some children are completely monolingual in Spanish. For these reasons, Seri is listed as a vulnerable language by UNESCO.

== Classification ==
The Serian family is a language family, with Seri as its only living member; related languages have disappeared in the last few centuries. Attempts have been made to link it to the Yuman family, to the now-extinct Salinan language of California, and to the much larger hypothetical Hokan family. These hypotheses came out of a period when attempts were being made to group all of the languages of the Americas into families. In the case of Seri, however, very little evidence has ever been produced. Until such evidence is presented and evaluated, the language is most appropriately considered an isolate.

== Name ==
The name "Seri" is an exonym for this people that has been used since the first contacts with the Spaniards (sometimes written differently, as "Ceres"). Gilg reported in 1692 that it was a Spanish name, but surely it was the name used by another group of the area to refer to the Seris. Nevertheless, modern claims that it is a Yaqui term that means something like "people of the sand" or an Opata term that means "people who run fast" are lacking in factual basis; no evidence has been presented for the former and no credible evidence has been presented for the latter.

The name used within the Seri community itself, for the language, is Cmiique iitom, which contrasts with Cocsar iitom ("Spanish language") and Maricaana iitom ("English language"). The expression is a noun phrase that is literally "(that) with which a Seri person speaks". The word Cmiique (phonetically [ˈkw̃ĩːkːɛ]) is the singular noun for "Seri person". The word iitom is the oblique nominalization of the intransitive verb caaitom ("talk"), with the prefix i- (third person possessor), and the null prefix for the nominalizer with this class of root. Another similar expression that one hears occasionally for the language is Cmiique iimx, which is a similar construction based on the transitive verb quimx ("tell") (root = amx).

The name chosen by the Seri committee for the name of the language used in the title of the recent dictionary was Comcaac quih Yaza, the plural version of Cmiique iitom. It was appropriate for a project of that type, although it is not a commonly used term. Comcaac (phonetically [koŋˈkɑːk]) is the plural form of Cmiique and yaza is the plural nominalized form corresponding to iitom. (ooza is the plural root, y- (with an accompanying vowel ablaut) is the nominalizer; the prefix for third person possessor elides before the y. The word quih is a singular article (which combines with the plural noun to refer to the Seri community).

The language was erroneously referred to as Kunkaak as early as the beginning of the 20th century (as in Hernández 1904), and this mistake has been repeated up to now by people who confuse the name of an ethnic group with the name of its language (which are often the same in Spanish and English). The lexeme Comcaac is used in the Seri language only to refer to the people.

== Phonology ==
=== Vowels ===
	Front	Back
High	i iː	o oː
Low	ɛ ɛː	ɑ ɑː

Vowel length is contrastive only in stressed syllables. The low front vowels /ɛ, ɛː/ are phonetically between open-mid and near-open and have also been transcribed as /æ, æː/.

The nonrounded vowels /i, ɛ, ɑ/ may be realized as diphthongs [iu̯, ɛo̯, ɑo̯] when followed by the labialized consonants /kʷ, xʷ, χʷ/, but this small phonetic detail is not written in the community-based writing system.

=== Consonants ===
		Labial	Dental/ Alveolar	Palatal	Velar		Uvular		Glottal
		Labial	Dental/ Alveolar	Palatal	plain	lab.	plain	lab.	Glottal
Nasal		m	n						
Stop		p	t		k	kʷ			ʔ
Fricative	median	ɸ	s	ʃ	x	xʷ	χ	χʷ	
Fricative	lateral		ɬ						
Approximant			l (Note: /l/ occurs in loanwords and in a few native words, where it may alternate with /ɬ/ depending on the word and the individual speaker.)	j					
Tap			ɾ (Note: /ɾ/ occurs only in loanwords.)						

Other consonants may occur in recent loans, such as [ɡ] in hamiigo ("friend" from Spanish amigo), and [β] in hoova ("grape" from Spanish uva).

The labial fricative /ɸ/ may be labiodental [f] for some speakers, and the postalveolar fricative /ʃ/ may be retroflex [ʂ].

/t/ and /n/ are prototypically dental.

In unstressed syllables, /m/ assimilates to the place of articulation of the following consonant. This assimilation may take place over word boundaries in connected speech. When /m/ is preceded by /k/ or /kʷ/, it becomes a nasalized approximant [w̃] and the following vowel becomes nasalized, e.g. cmiique /kmiːkɛ/ "person; Seri" is pronounced [ˈkw̃ĩːkːɛ] or [ˈkw̃ĩːkːi]. For some speakers, word-final /m/ may become [ŋ] at the end of a phrase or sentence, or when said in isolation. It can be documented, by careful examination of word lists collected in the nineteenth century, that some of these phonetic rules have arisen fairly recently.

=== Syllable structure ===
Syllable structure in Seri is fairly complex. Simple syllable onsets are most common, however, syllables without onsets can occur at the beginning of a word. The language generally allows up to three consonants to occur together at the beginning of a syllable, although consonants cannot be long word initially (i.e. /tːi/ or /pː/). Specific combinations that may occur are much less restricted than English, for instance. Seri three-consonant onsets such as /ptk/ do occur, as in ptcamn (Cortez spiny lobster, Panulirus inflatus). Simple codas occur, although complex ones are more common. Word-medial codas contain a single consonant, whereas word-final codas may include up to three. Clusters of four consonants also occur, but they are more rare in the lexicon: /kʷsχt/ in cösxtamt, ..., "there were many, ..."; /mxkχ/ in ipoomjc x, ... "if s/he brings it, ...", (with enclitic x).

The nuclei of Seri syllables can include one, two, or three vowels. Long vowels are indicated in writing by doubling (i.e. ⟨aa⟩ or ⟨ii⟩ for /aː/ or /iː/). Vowel clusters may include 3 separate elements, as in the one syllable word kaoi (NOM-D-delouse). Syllables with complex nuclei are stressed; otherwise, the stress generally occurs on the first syllable of a words root. Vowel clusters often occur in the initial syllable of a root.

Affixes, which may consist of one or more consonants with no vowels, can be added before or after existing consonant clusters, thereby complicating pronunciation and syllabification. When necessary, empty vowel positions are inserted and often filled with a syllabic nasal or an "i" to aid in pronunciation.

=== Stress ===
Stress is contrastive in Seri. Although it usually falls on the first syllable of a root, there are many words where it does not, mostly nouns, as well as a small class of common verbs whose stress may fall on a prefix rather than on the root. An alternative analysis, recently proposed and with fewer exceptions, assigns stress to the penultimate syllable of the root of a word (since suffixes are never stressed and prefixes receive stress only as a result of phonological fusion with the root). This rule is also sensitive to syllable weight. A heavy final syllable in the root attracts stress. A heavy syllable is one that has a long vowel or vowel cluster or a final consonant cluster. (A single consonant in the syllable coda is typically counted as extrametrical in Seri.)

Consonants following a stressed syllable are lengthened, and vowels separated from a preceding stressed vowel by a single consonant are also lengthened so that cootaj /ˈkoːtɑx/ ("ant") is pronounced [ˈkoːtːɑːx]. Such allophonically lengthened vowels may be longer than the phonemically long vowels found in stressed syllables. The lengthening does not occur if the following consonant or vowel is part of a suffix (coo-taj, the plural of coo ("shovelnose guitarfish"), is [ˈkoːtɑx], without lengthening), if the stressed syllable consists of a long vowel and a short vowel (caaijoj, a kind of manta ray, is [ˈkɑːixox], without lengthening), or if the stressed vowel is lengthened to indicate intensity. It also does not affect most loanwords.

== Grammar ==
The Seri language is a head-final language. The verb typically occurs at the end of a clause (after the subject and direct object, in that order), and main clauses typically follow dependent clauses. The possessor precedes the possessum. The language does not have many true adjectives; adjective-like verbs follow the head noun in the same kind of construction and with the same kind of morphology as verbs in the language. The words that correspond to prepositions in languages like English are usually constrained to appear before the verb; in noun phrases they appear following their complement. Verbs, nouns, and postpositions are inflected word categories in Seri.

=== Nouns ===
Nouns inflect for plurality through suffixation. Compare noosi 'mourning dove' and noosi-lc 'mourning doves'. Pluralization is very complicated; for this reason, each noun is listed in the dictionary with its plural form. Some nouns ostensibly use an infix to indicate plural: caatc 'grasshopper', caatjc 'grasshoppers'. A few nouns have completely suppletive plural forms: cmiique 'Seri person', comcáac 'Seri people', ziix 'thing', xiica 'things'.

Kinship terms and body part nouns inflect for possessors through prefixes (with slightly different prefix sets). Compare ma-sáac 'your son' (of man) and mi-lít 'your head'. As they are obligatorily possessed nouns, a special prefix appears when no possessor is specified, and kinship terms sometimes have additional material at the end as well. Compare ha-sáac-at 'one's son', and ha-lít 'one's head'. Some nouns have an additional plural form to distinguish between singular and plural possessors: itoj 'his/her eye', itoj 'his/her eyes', itolcoj 'their eyes'.

=== Verbs ===
Finite verbs obligatorily inflect for number of the subject, person of the subject, direct object and indirect object and tense/mood. For subject person and number, compare ihpyopánzx 'I ran', inyopánzx 'you (sg.) ran', yopanzx 'it ran, she ran, he ran', hayopáncojc 'we ran', mayopáncojc 'you (pl.) ran', yopáncojc 'they ran'.

For object person (which is written as a separate word in the orthography although it is really just a prefix), compare ma hyooho 'I saw you (sg.)', mazi hyooho 'I saw you (pl.)', and ihyóoho 'I saw him/her/it/them'.

For indirect object (also written as a separate word except in third person), compare me hyacóhot 'I showed it to you (sg. or pl.)', cohyacóhot 'I showed it to him/her/them'.

The verb "tenses" divide between medial forms and final forms, irrealis and realis: popánzx (irrealis, medial, third person) '(if) it/she/he runs', tpanzx (realis, medial, third person) '(as) it/she/he ran', yopánzx (distal realis, final, third person) 'it/she/he ran', impánzx (proximal realis, final, third person) 'it/she/he ran', spánxz aha (irrealis, final, third person) 'it/she/he will run'.

A verb may also be negative and/or passive.

A transitive verb may be detransitivized through a morphological operation, and causative verbs may be formed morphologically.

=== Postpositions and relational preverbs ===
The postpositions of Seri inflect for the person of their complement: hiti 'on me', miti 'on you', iti 'on her/him/it'. Most of the words that have been called postpositions at one time (and some of which still are, in limited situations) are actually relational preverbs; they must occur in a position immediately before the verbal complex and are commonly not adjacent to their semantic complements. Some of these have suppletive stems to indicate a plural complement; compare miihax 'with you (sg.)' and miicot 'with you (pl.)'.

=== Articles ===
Seri has several articles, which follow the noun.

The singular indefinite article (a, an) is zo before consonants, and z before vowels (it presumably is historically related to the word for "one", which is tazo). The plural indefinite article (roughly equivalent to some) is pac.

Cótotaj zo hant z iti poop...
boojum tree a place a in {if there is}
If there is a boojum tree in a place...

Comcaac pac yoozcam.
Seris some came.
Some Seris arrived.

There are several different definite articles (the), depending on the position and movement of the object:

- Quij (singular) and coxalca (plural) are used with seated objects.
- Cap/cop (sg.) and coyolca (pl.) are used with standing objects. Cap and cop are dialectal variants.
- Com (sg.) and coitoj (pl.) are used with objects lying down.
- Hipmoca (sg.) and hizmocat (pl.) are used with close, approaching objects.
- Hipintica (sg.) and hipinticat (pl.) are used with close objects going away.
- Timoca (sg.) and tamocat (pl.) are used with distant, approaching objects.
- Tintica (sg.), tanticat (pl.), himintica (sg.), and himinticat (pl.) are used with distant objects going away.
- Hac (sg. & pl.) are used with locations and verbal nouns. Hac is pronounced [ʔɑk] after vowels and [ɑk] after consonants.
- Quih (sg.) and coi (pl.) are unspecified. Quih is pronounced [kiʔ] before consonants, [kʔ] before vowels, and [k] at the end of an utterance.

These articles are derived historically from nominalized forms (as appear in relative clauses in Seri) of verbs: quiij ("that which sits"), caap ("that which stands"), coom ("that which lies"), quiih ("that (especially soft item like cloth) which is located"), moca ("that which comes"), contica ("that which goes"), and caahca ("that which is located"; root -ahca)

=== Demonstratives ===
Four simple demonstrative pronouns occur, plus a large set of compound demonstrative adjectives and pronouns. The simple demonstratives are tiix ("that one"), taax ("those, that (mass)"), hipíix ("this one"), and hizáax ("these, this (mass)").

The compound demonstratives are formed by added a deictic element to an article. Examples include himcop ("that (standing far off)"), ticop ("that (standing closer)"), hipcop ("this (standing)"), himquij ("that (sitting far off)"), himcom ("that (lying far off)"), etc. These compound demonstratives may be used either as adjectives (at the end of the noun phrase) or as pronouns.

=== Personal pronouns ===
Two personal nonreflexive pronouns are in common use: he (first person, "I", "we") and me (second person, "you" (singular or plural). These pronouns may have singular or plural referents; the difference in number is indicated in the verb stem. The reflexive pronouns are hisoj "myself", misoj "yourself", isoj "herself, himself, itself", hisolca "ourselves", misolca "yourselves" and isolca "themselves".

== Lexicon ==
The Seri language has a rich basic lexicon. The usefulness of the lexicon is multiplied many times over by the use of idiomatic expressions. For example, one of the many olfactory metaphors used by speakers is the expression hiisax cheemt iha ("I am angry"), literally 'my.spirit stinks (Declarative)'. (The kinship terminology is among the most extensive and complicated that has been documented in the world.) Seri has a small number of loanwords, most ultimately from Spanish, but also from other languages such as O'odham.

Many ideas are expressed not with single words, but with fixed expressions consisting of several words. For example, "newspaper" is hapaspoj cmatsj (literally, "paper that tells lies"), "compass" is ziix hant iic iihca quiya (literally, "thing that knows where places are"), and "radio" is ziix haa tiij coos (literally, "thing that sitting there sings"). This kind of phrase formation is deeply ingrained in the lexicon; it has been used in the past to create new terms for lexical items that became taboo due to the death of a person whose nickname was based on that word.

== Writing system ==
Seri is written in the Latin script.

A a	C c	Cö cö	E e	F f	H h	I i	J j	Jö jö	L l	M m
/ɑ/	/k/	/kʷ/	/ɛ/	/ɸ/	/ʔ/	/i/	/x/	/xʷ/	/ɬ/	/m/
N n	O o	P p	Qu qu	R r	S s	T t	X x	Xö xö	Y y	Z z
/n/	/o/	/p/	/k/	/ɾ/	/s/	/t/	/χ/	/χʷ/	/j/	/ʃ/

⟨Qu⟩ represents /k/ before the vowels e and i, while c is used elsewhere, as in Spanish. Long vowels are indicated by doubling the vowel letter. The voiced lateral /l/ is indicated by placing an underline under ⟨l⟩, i.e. ⟨Ḻ ḻ⟩. Stress is generally not indicated, but can be marked by placing an acute accent ⟨´⟩ over the stressed vowel. The representation of the rounded back consonants using a digraph which includes o-dieresis serves to visually unite morphemes that have allomorphs containing the full vowel o, the historical source of the rounded consonants. Example: xeecoj /χɛːkox/ ("wolf"), xeecöl /χɛːkʷɬ/ ("wolves").

The letters B, D, G, Gü, and V occur in some loanwords. The letters Q and U both occur only in Qu.

The Seri alphabet was developed in the 1950s by Edward W. and Mary B. Moser, and later revised by a committee of Seri men and women working with Stephen Marlett. In particular:

- The rounded velar stop /kʷ/ was written both ⟨cu⟩ and ⟨cö⟩, but is now only written ⟨cö⟩.
- The diphthongs [ao̯] [iu̯] [eo̯] were written ⟨ao⟩ ⟨iu⟩ ⟨eo⟩ respectively, but are now considered to be allophones of /a i e/ before rounded consonants, e.g. Tahéojc → Tahejöc.
- The velar nasal [ŋ] was written ⟨ng⟩, but is now considered an allophone of /m/ and written ⟨m⟩, e.g. congcáac → comcaac.
- Nasalized vowels were marked with an underline, but are now considered allophones occurring after /km/, e.g. cuá̱am → cmaam.
- Lengthening of vowels and consonants that follow a stressed syllable were written double, but are now considered allophonic, e.g. hóoppaatj → hóopatj. Long vowels and consonants in other situations are still written double.
- Word boundaries sometimes changed, with clitics being often originally written solid with the adjacent words, but now written separately.

== Literature ==
A growing body of Seri literature is being published. Some of the stories that were recorded, transcribed and published earlier are now being re-edited and published. New material is also being prepared by several writers. Essays by three Seri writers appear in the new anthology of Native American literature published by the University of Nebraska Press. The most recent literature is appearing as apps for Android phones, often with accompanying audio.

The Constitution of Mexico has been translated in its entirety into the Seri language by the Instituto Nacional de Lenguas Indígenas. The official name of the Constitution in Seri is Icaaitom Caaixaj Quipac Coha Hapaspoj Caacoj Quih Iti Hant Coii Hant Iij Cacloj Com Oaanloj Coi.
