= Seri people =

Ethnic group

Seri
Comcaac

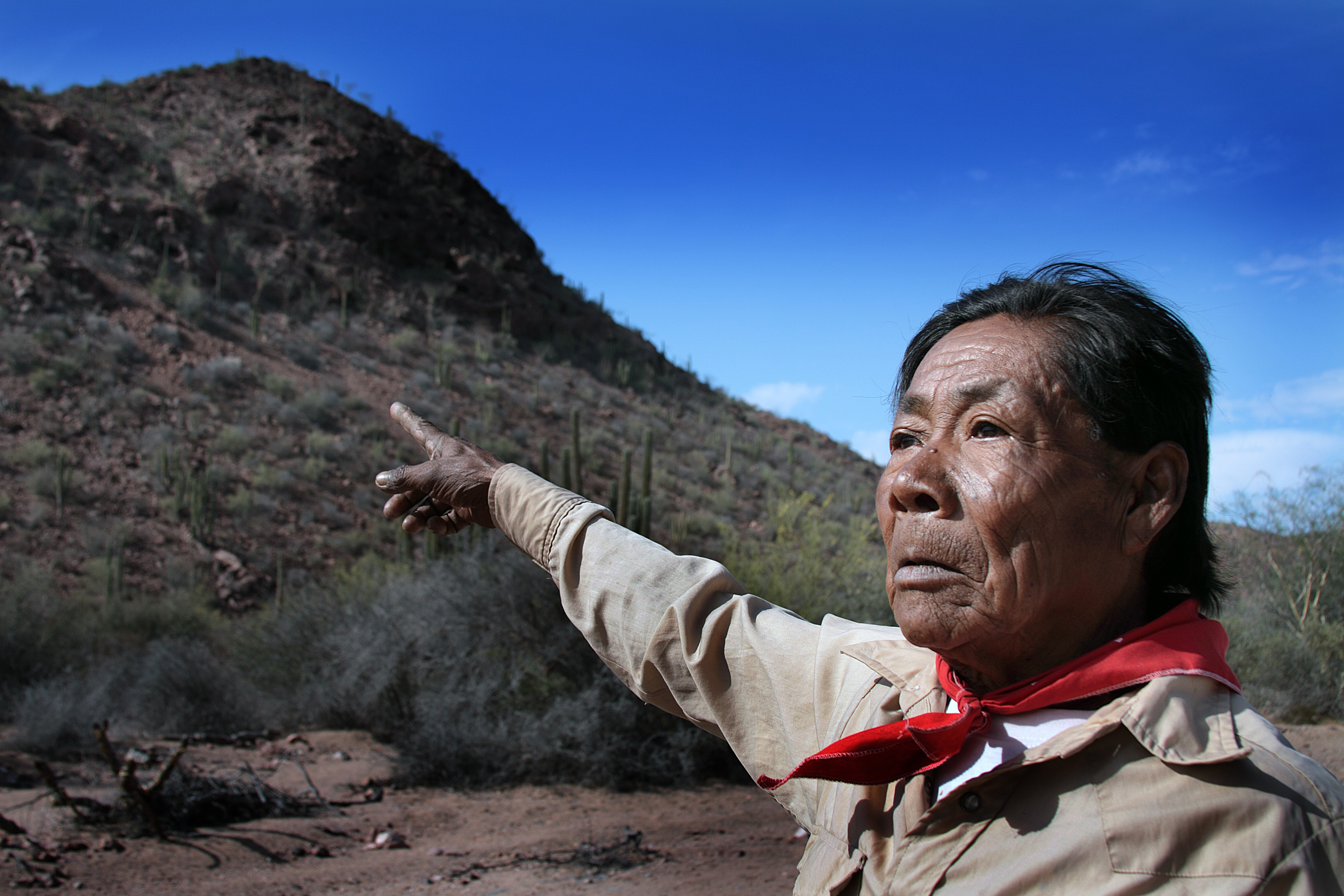
- Chapito, a Seri shaman from Punta Chueca, Sonora

Total population
- ~1,000 (2006)

Regions with significant populations
- Mexico; Sonora

Languages
- Seri • Spanish

Religion
- Traditionally animists, currently primarily Christian

The Seri or Comcaac people are an indigenous group of the Mexican state of Sonora. The majority reside on the Seri communal property (Spanish: ejido), in the towns of Punta Chueca (Seri: Socaaix) and El Desemboque (Seri: Haxöl Iihom) on the mainland coast of the Gulf of California. Tiburón Island (Tahejöc) and San Esteban Island (Cofteecöl and sometimes Hast) were also part of their traditional territory. They maintain an intimate relationship with both the sea and the land. They are one of the ethnic groups of Mexico that has most strongly maintained their language and culture throughout the years after contact with Spanish and Mexican cultures.

The Seri people are not related culturally or linguistically to other groups that have lived in the area, such as the Opata, Yaqui (sg.: Yequim, pl.: Yectz), O'odham (sg.: Hapaay), or Cochimí. The Seri language is distinct from all others in the region and is considered a language isolate.

Beside the Apache (sg.: Hapats, pl.: Hapatsoj) and Yaqui, the Seri are best known as fierce warriors for their resistance against subjugation by the Spanish (sg.: Casopin) and later Mexicans (sg./pl.: Cocsar). The Seri had been living on the coast of Sonora with little outside interference for centuries, if not millennia. But with colonization, they were displaced from their land and forced to work for others and adopt Christianity. Reséndez writes about a slaving raid in 1660s: "A posse of Spaniards had cut a swath through the Seri lands, killing most of the adults of one band and distributing the children in the Spanish towns of Sonora."

The name Seri is an exonym of uncertain origin. (Claims that it is from Opata or from Yaqui were nineteenth-century speculations based on similarity to words in those languages and lack clear evidence.) Their name for themselves is Comcaac (phonemically /kom'kɑːk/, phonetically [koŋˈkɑːk]); singular: Cmiique (phonemically /'kmiːkɛ/, phonetically [ˈkw̃ĩːkːɛ]).

== Seri territory ==
The Seri territory in the state of Sonora spans an area of approximately 211,000 hectares (520,000 acres) of land and is located on both continental land as well as land from Tiburon Island, which is located in the Gulf of California off the central coast of the state.

The Seri primarily inhabit the towns of El Desemboque (Haxöl Iihom, 29°30'13"N, 112°23'43"W), the municipality of Pitiquito, Punta Chueca (Socaaix, 29°0'54"N, 112°9'42"W), and the municipality of Hermosillo located on the coast of Sonora. Following the fishing cycles, the location of some individuals and their relatives can vary between all fishing territories which are located along 100 km (62 mi) of coastline.

== Infrastructure ==
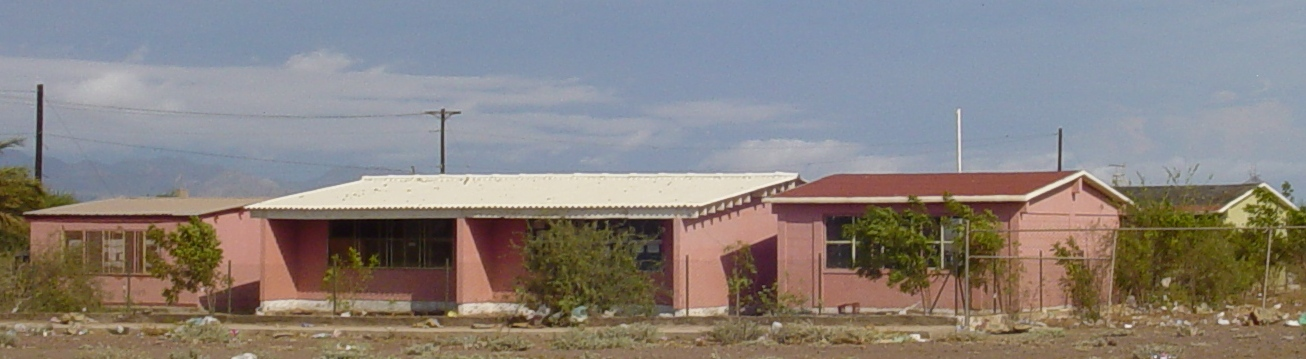
Primary school in Punta Chueca (Socáaix)

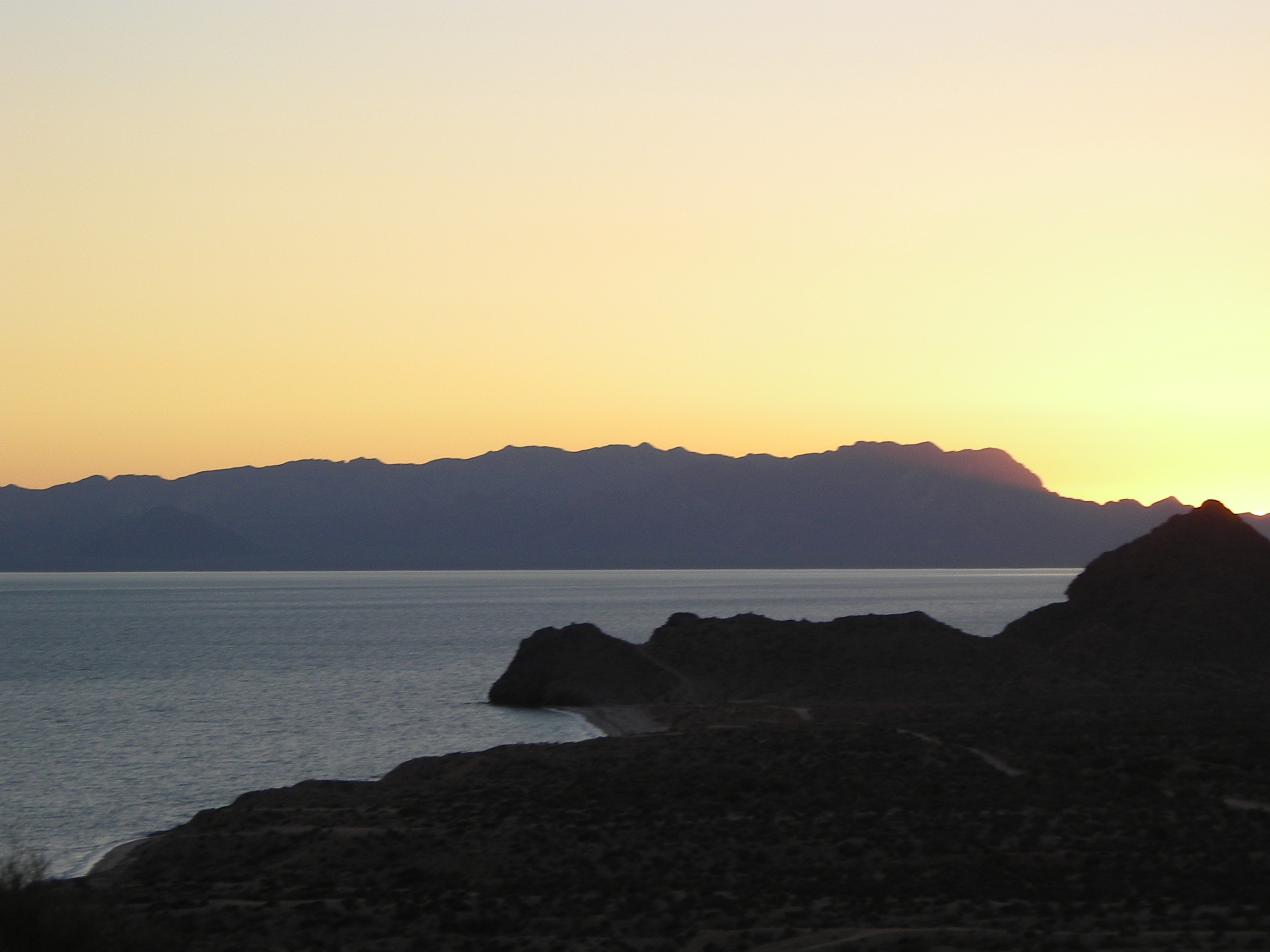
View of the southern part of Tiburón island

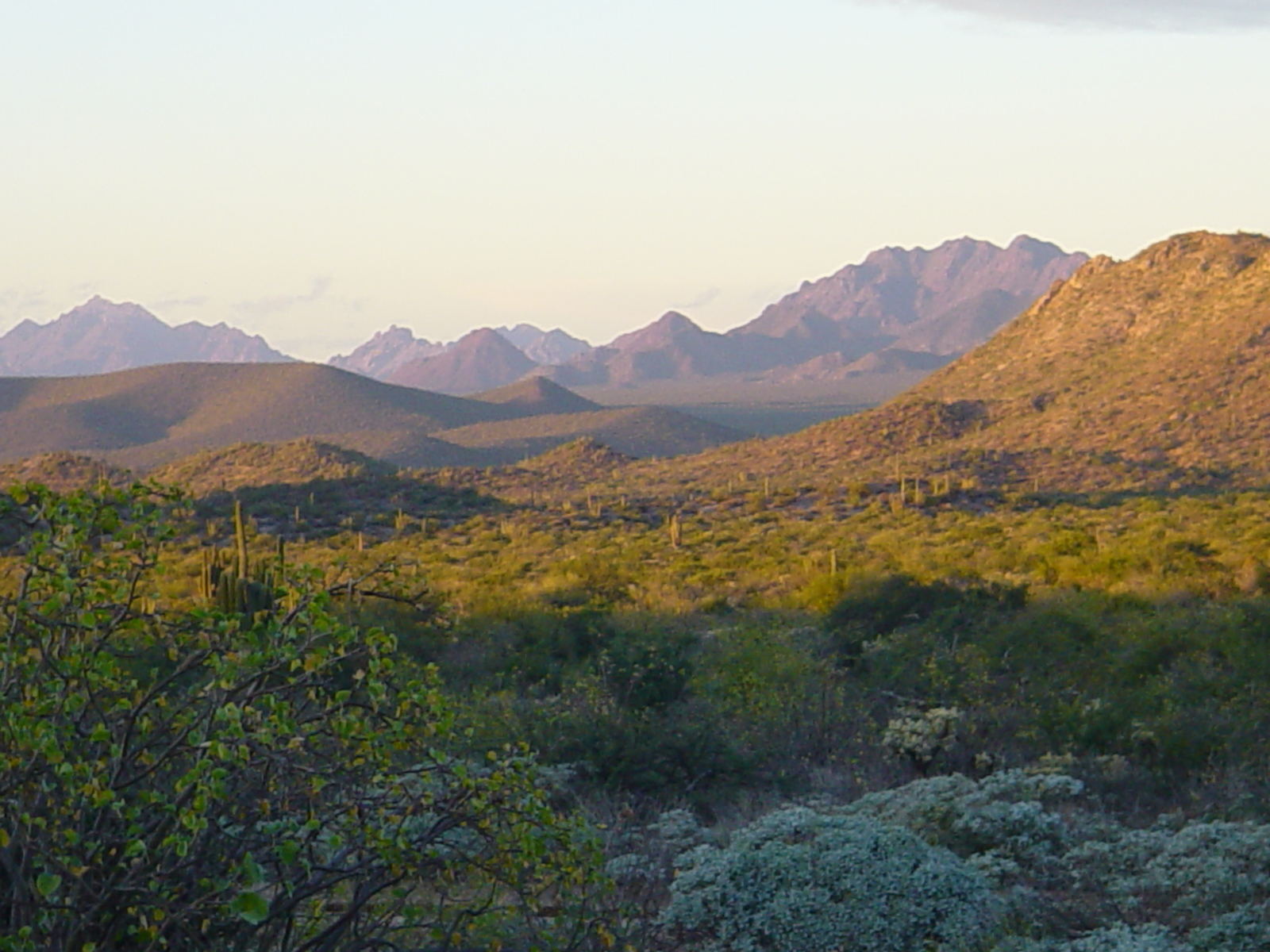
Scenery from the southern part of Seri territory

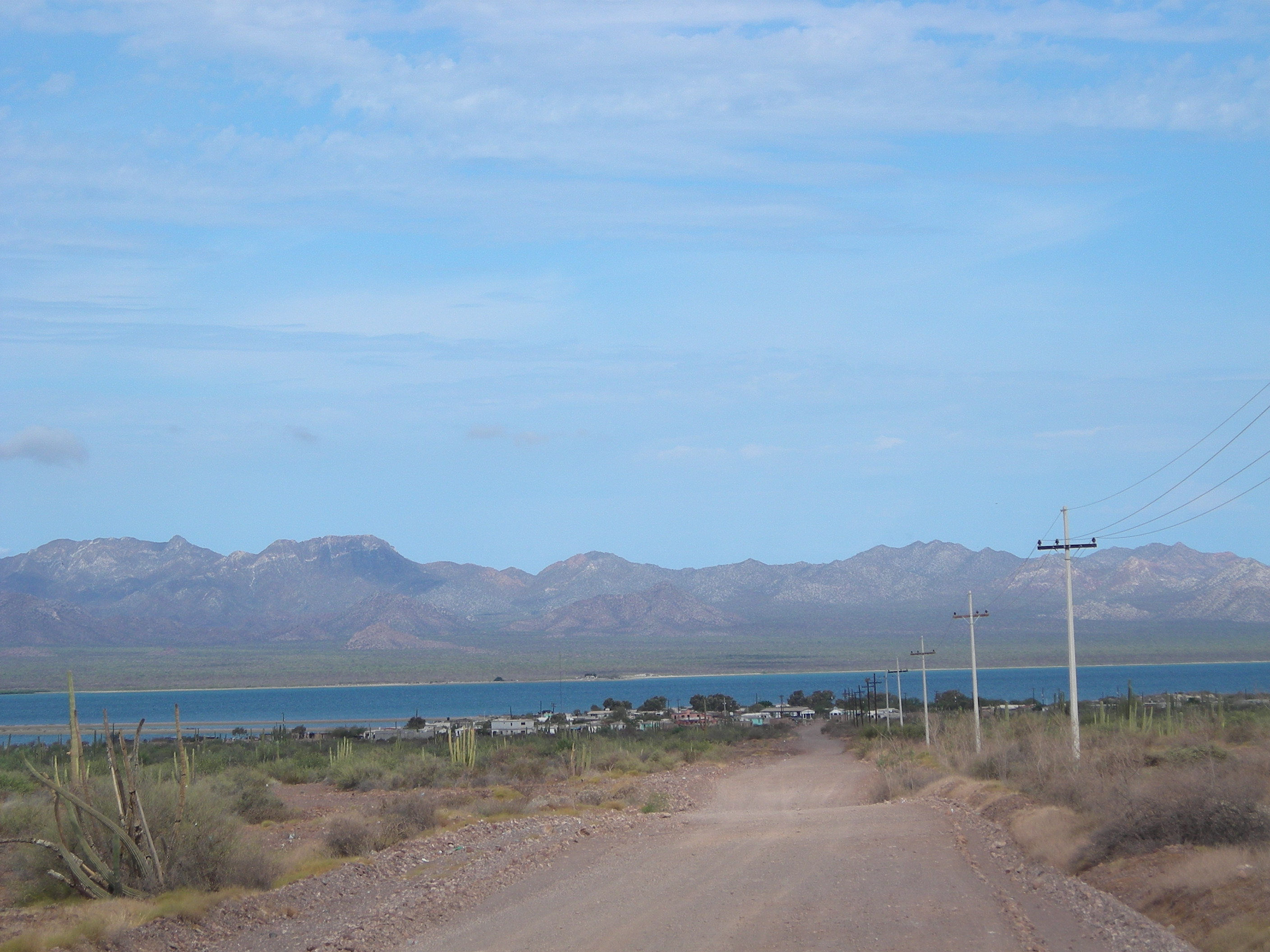
Punta Chueca (Socáaix) with Tiburón Island in the background

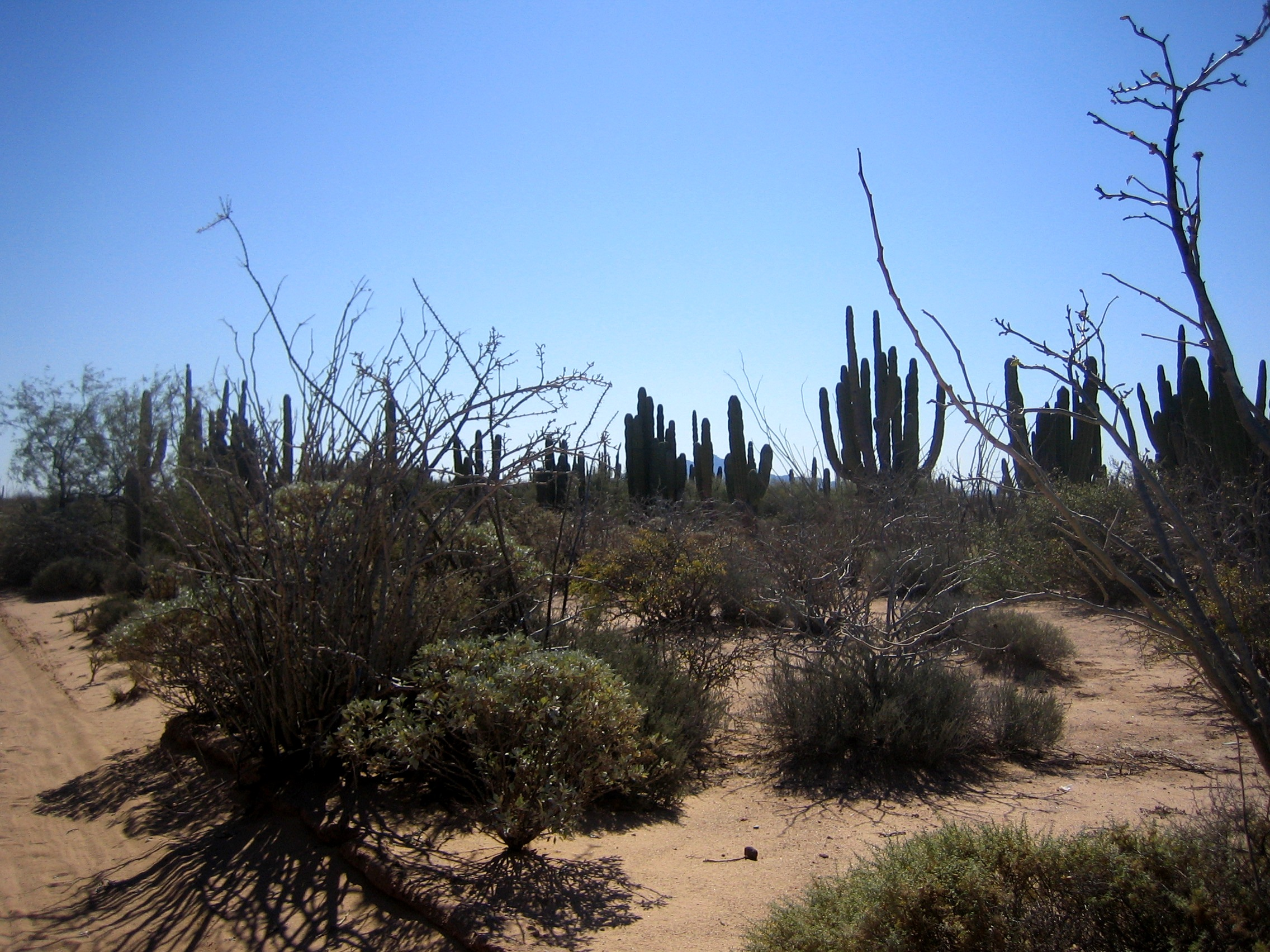
Scenery of Cardon cactus in Sonora (Mexico)

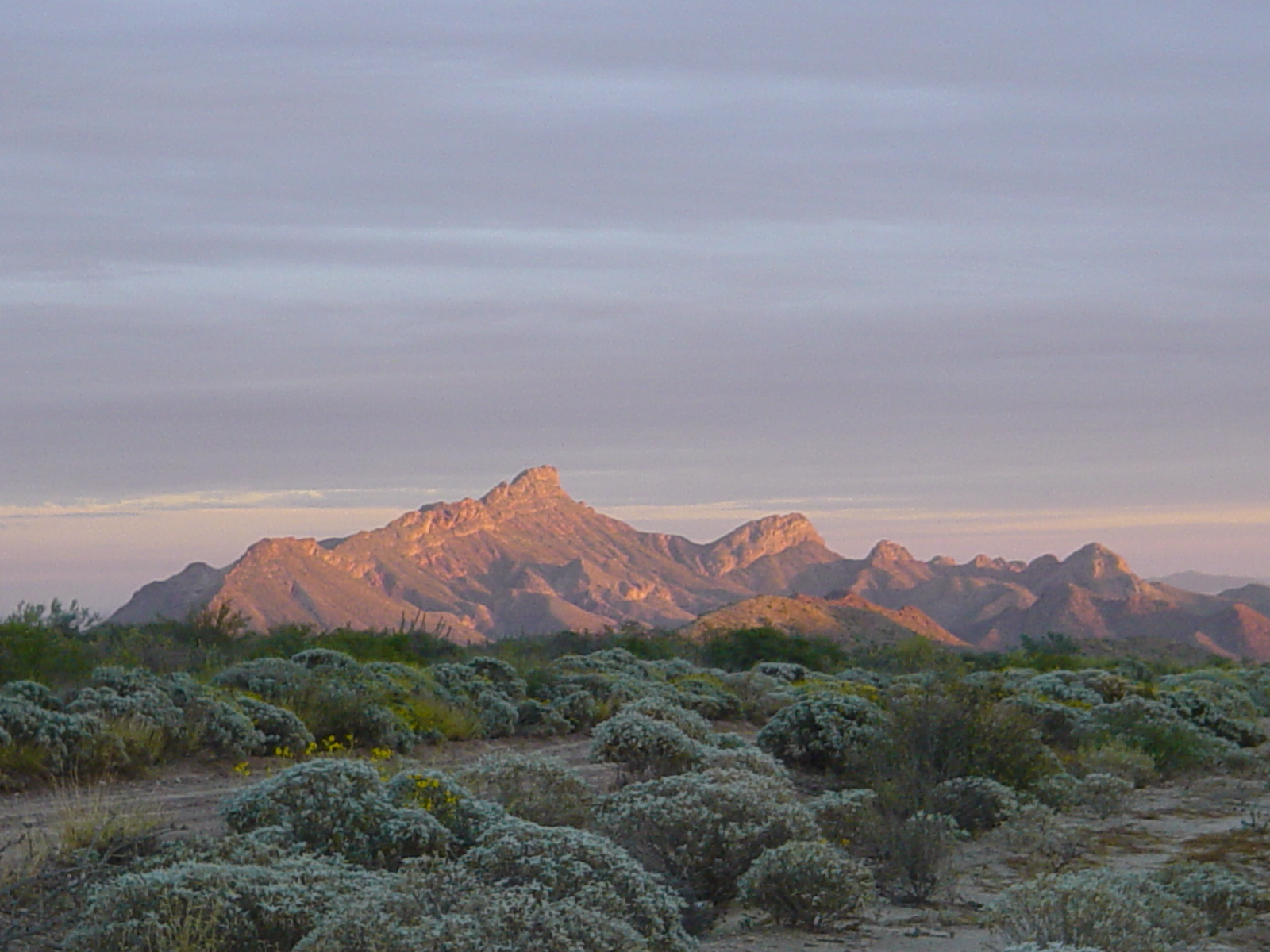
Scenery in the southern part of Seri territory

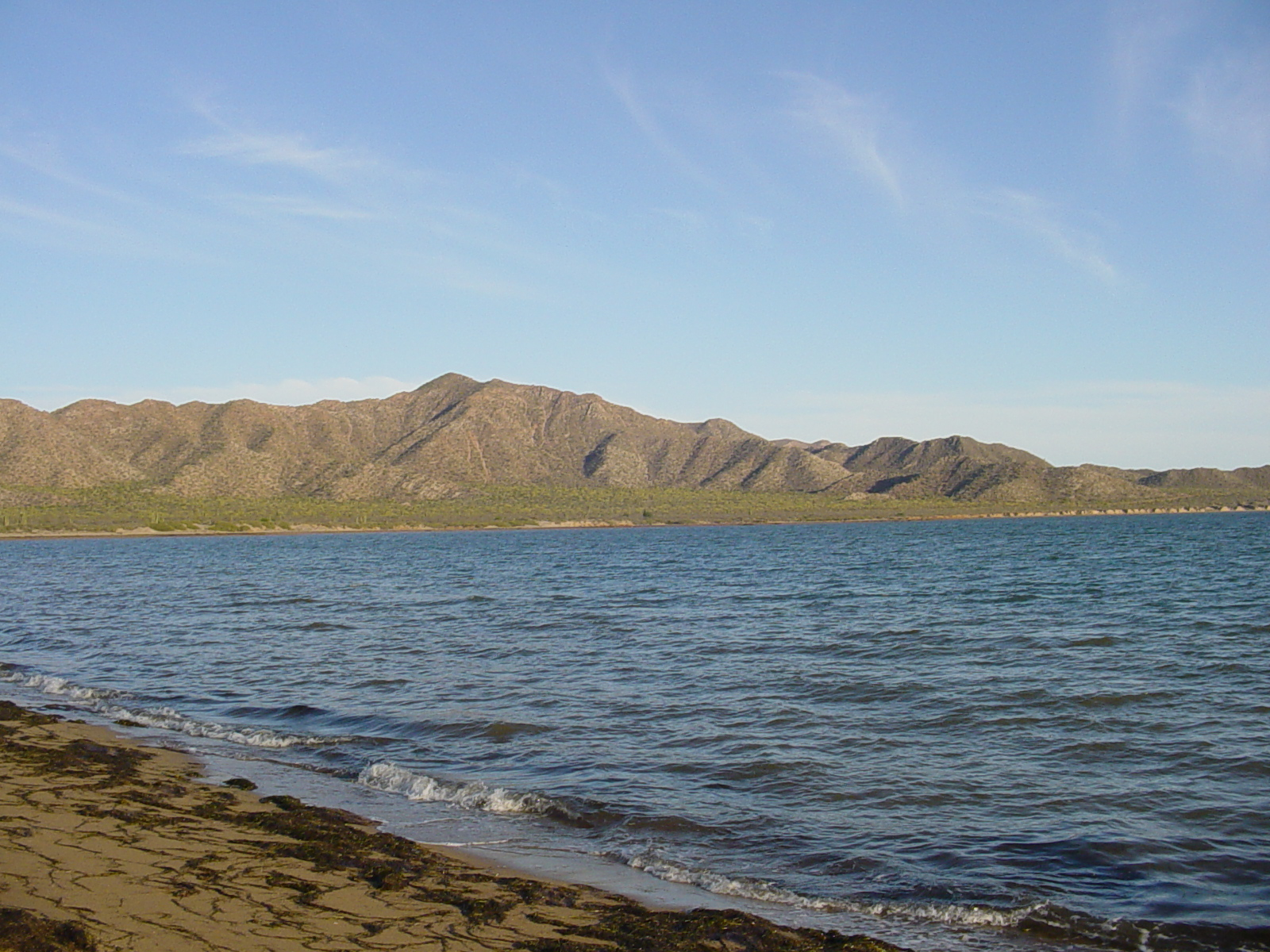
Scenery from the southern territory of the Seri and a part of Xepe Coosot

Through a road to the south, the residents of Punta Chueca communicate with the village of Bahía de Kino. Towards the north, a road connects Desemboque with the city of Puerto Libertad. Each village has schools for students at preschool, secondary, and primary levels.

== History ==
In the pre-Hispanic period, the territory of the Seri was located between the mountains, the Encinas desert, and the Gulf of California. The territory extended from the Altar desert in the north to the Yaqui river in the South and from Horcasitas in the east to the nearby islands of Tiburón, San Esteban, Patos, and Alcatraz in the west. As a nomadic people, the Seri travelled across an area that corresponds to fourteen current municipalities of Sonora. It was believed in this period that the Seri people were organized into six bands, divided into their own clans based on their paternal lineage. On a daily basis, there was no leader figure within the clan. Leaders were named only under extraordinary circumstances, such as during war or difficult hunting, and fishing seasons. Only the most capable person was appointed to fulfil this position as leader.

The persecution of the Seri people by the Spanish and Mexican military began in the mid-18th century. Expeditions by the Mexican military were led against the Seri and continued to decimate their population and territory until the early 1900s. The Seri people were the antithesis of what the Spanish conquistadors sought. Their territory was not very useful, they did not have accumulated wealth, they did not produce enough to make the conquest profitable, and they were not suited as laborers to cultivate and serve as they were not familiar with that lifestyle. Because of this, the Seri people preserved their autonomy and culture for much longer than other Indigenous peoples. During the colonial period, the Jesuits, who tried to evangelize them and teach them agricultural practices, were the most sustained contact the Seri had with outsiders. Their letters provide the earliest and most comprehensive descriptions of the people. None of their efforts, however, were successful, and the Seri always returned to their desert lifestyles which is why they were always considered an unlawful group. The Spanish, then later the Mexicans, tried to effectively kill off all of the Seri which led to the nearly total annihilation of the group. However, the Seri people were never formally conquered or evangelized during that time. Little by little they were confined to a part of their territory and decimated in number.

By the time of Mexican independence, the previous organization system had been dismantled, and the Seri were almost entirely settled on the mainland. However, throughout the first two-thirds of the 19th century, they were persecuted and nearly annihilated by both Mexican soldiers and ranchers. Some of the Seri people managed to seek refuge on Tiburón Island.

The scarcity of water and of animals for hunting, along with various diseases, were the predominant factors as to why the Seri people abandoned their refuge on Tiburón Island and returned to the mainland. They were first temporarily hired as fish merchants and ranchers and later settled down. Among the external causes that allowed their successful return to the mainland was the crisis of 1929, which caused a large migration of poor people to cities and agricultural centers in northern and northeastern Mexico. This increased the consumption of fish and other marine products, which were cheaper than beef. From that moment, the Seri people began to occupy an essential role in the economy of commercial exchange and to use money in their market operations. This began a period in which rapid structural, organizational, and cultural changes occurred.

== Bands ==
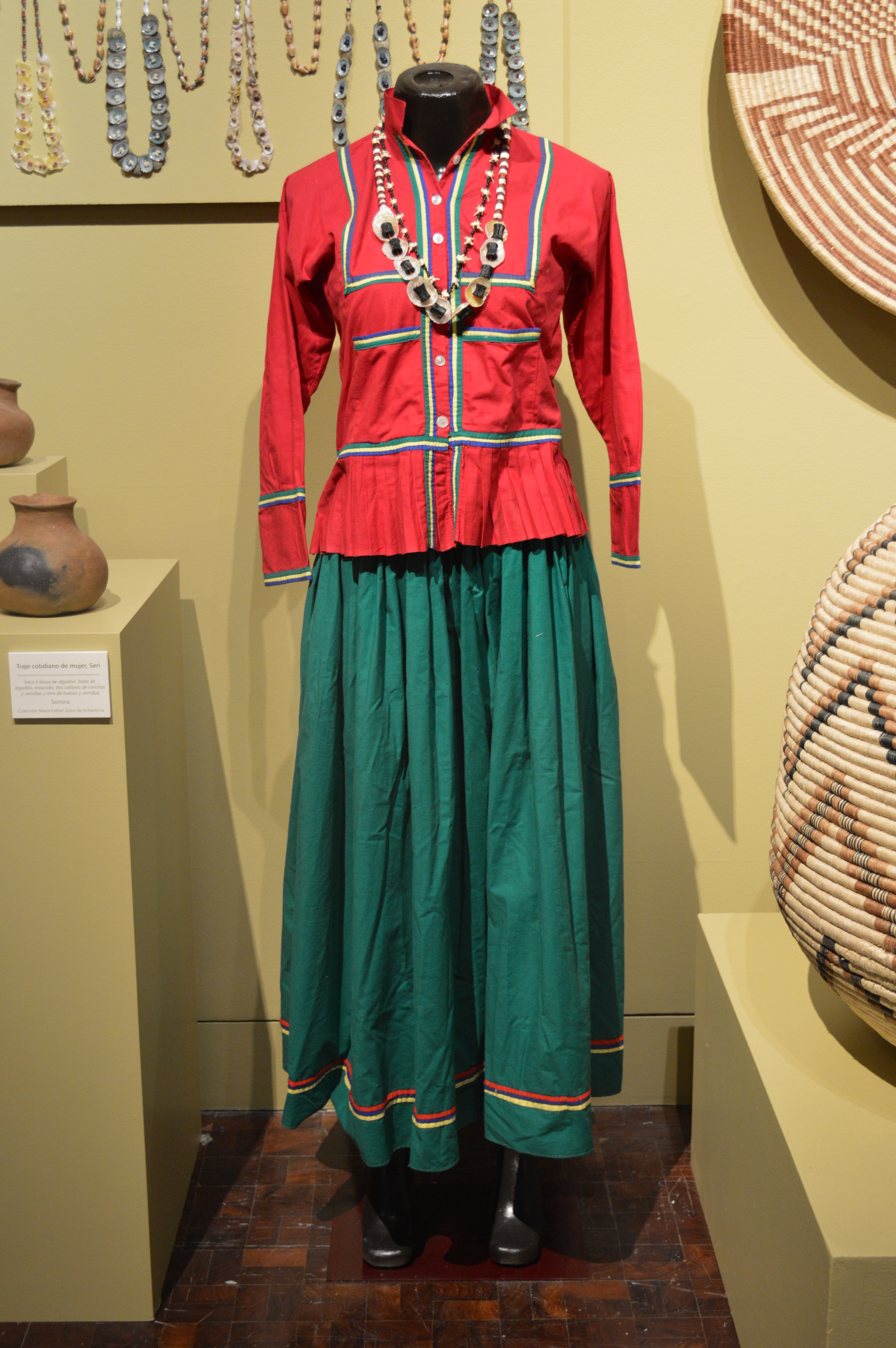
Seri woman's dress on display at the Museo de Arte Popular, Mexico City

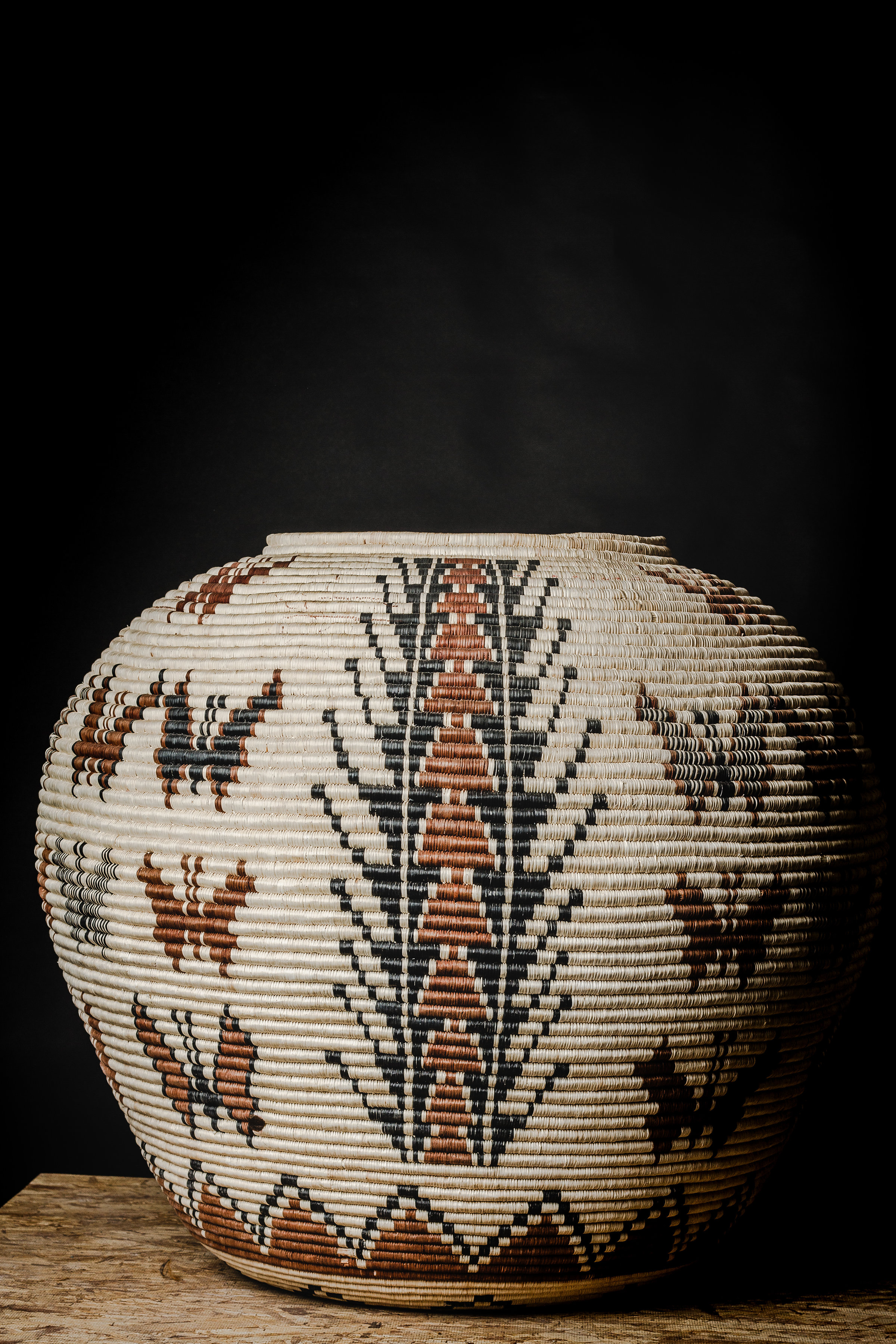
Seri basket made from the haat plant (Jatropha cuneata)

The Seri were formerly divided into six bands. They were:

- Xiica hai iicp coii or Xica hai iic coii ("those who live toward the north wind"), also known as Tepocas or Saliñeros, who inhabited a large area to the north of the other bands, along the coast between Puerto Lobos and Punta Tepopa and somewhat inland, constituting six subgroups with following camps: Zaah Hacáila, Pailc Haacöt, Xpano Hax, Haasíxp, Haxöl Ihom, Xapoyáh.
- Xiica xnaai iicp coii or Xica xnai iic coii ("those that are to the south", "those who lived toward the south wind"), also known as Tastioteños who inhabited the coast from Bahía Kino to Guaymas.
- Tahejöc comcaac or Tahéjöc comcáac ("Tiburón Island people"). The Spanish named the island Tiburón (Shark), in Seri it is called Tahejöc. They are also known as the Seris or Tiburones who inhabited the coasts of Tiburón Island, and the coast of Mexico opposite it, north of the Xiica xnaai iicp coii., constituting five subgroups with following camps: Hajháx, Cyazim, Sacpátix, Haanc, Hatquísa, Taij It, Inóohcö Quixaz, Xniizc, Tacáta, Heeme, Hast Hax, Soosni Itáaai, Xoxáacöl, Caail iti ctamcö, Hax Ipac.
  - Xoxáacöl (group of people within the Tiburon Island people group)
- Heeno comcaac or Heno comcáac ("desert people"), who inhabited the central valley of Tiburón Island.
- Xnaamotat or Xnaa motat ("those that came from the south"), also known as Upanguaymas or Guaymas, who inhabited a small strip south of Guaymas between the Xiica hai iic coii and the Tahejöc comcaac.
- Xiica hast ano coii or Xica hast ano coii ("those that are in San Esteban Island"), hast ano ctam (male), hast ano cmaam (female)), who inhabited San Esteban Island and the southern coast of Tiburón Island.

Three of the bands were further subdivided. Relations between bands were not always friendly, and internal conflict sometimes occurred.

Some bands were also living on the Baja California Peninsula (Hant Ihiin), they were called Hant Ihiini comcaac.

It has been said that these groups spoke three distinct but mutually intelligible dialects. It is thought that the first dialect was spoken by the Xiica hai iic coii, Xiica xnaai iic coii, Tahejöc comcaac and Heeno comcaac Bands and presently this variant is the only dialect spoken and is the ancestor of modern-day Seri. The second dialect was spoken by the Xnaamotat Band, but it is currently extinct and there was very little data collected regarding this dialect. The third dialect is also extinct and was spoken by the Xiica hast ano coii Band; it was described as sounding musical, as if speakers were singing instead of speaking (Moser 1963). Speakers sometimes make remarks regarding certain expressions being characteristic of particular Bands, especially of the Xiica hast ano coii Band. These communication differences were thought to have kept the groups from having much social interaction with each other.

After the Seri population was greatly reduced by conflicts with the Mexican government and the O'odham, and epidemics of smallpox and measles, the remaining Seris grouped together and the band divisions were lost.

== Language ==
The Seri language, cmiique iitom, is a language isolate because there is not sufficient evidence of a relationship between it and any other language. Currently the majority of the population is bilingual to a certain degree, although they prefer to speak their own language in their local activities. Speakers maintain an enormously rich oral tradition that preserves their history and culture. In the last few decades, a very small part of this tradition has presented itself in a written form.

The Seri language has a plethora of terms in order to describe kinship relationships many of which describe both the sex of the subject and the sex of the speaker. For example, there are four terms to describe grandparents, each term specifies to which parent the grandmother or grandfather belongs to. Additionally there are many terms to describe siblings which account for the age and sex of the referent and speaker.

The Seri use their language for new cultural elements rather than adopting Spanish terms. They create new terms within the Seri language to designate these additions.

== Health ==
The preservation of knowledge on traditional therapies and techniques may be lacking among the Seri. They possess knowledge about some plants that can be used to cure mild illnesses but the study of Seri ethnomedicine is still being investigated today. The biodiversity of their arid climate and inability to maintain standard agricultural practices and livestock means that the knowledge of their ethnomedicines is very valuable. Marine resources like molluscs and algae were used for medicinal purposes in addition to terrestrial plants. The nomadic lifestyle of the group caused changes in their diet and patterns of consumption which has generated varying health problems like diabetes.

There is presently a lack of medicinal specialists amongst the Seri. For traditional medical treatment, potential Seri patients travel to nearby communities or the state capital in order to receive treatment. Women still maintain some knowledge of traditional medicines and prepare traditional medicinal items like soaps and creams to sell to outsiders.

There is record of two previously known medicinal specialists in Seri history. Cola conáajj was a midwife who used resources from regional flora and fauna to assist with pregnancy and labor. Ziix haaco cama was a noted spiritual specialist who also utilized traditional Seri medicine.

Seri knowledge of their physical environment has resulted in the publication of material about Seri ethnobotany which showcases how the Seri have preserved a lot of information about their centuries-long coexistence with the flora and fauna of their region. The severe ecological conditions of their environment and its changeability is a driving force behind their knowledge of flora and fauna of the area as the ability to remain nomadic due to these conditions was a necessity.

== Housing ==
In Seri villages, houses are mainly made of concrete blocks with a concrete or asbestos roof, although it is possible to find some houses made of cardboard. In general, these houses consist of a kitchen, dining room, bathroom, and one or two bedrooms. This type of housing was promoted and supported by the federal and state government between 1974 and 1984.

In fishing areas it is still possible to find traditional houses that are made of shelters made of grasses and other materials (traditionally loggerhead shells) on top of an ocotillo frame (Fouquieria splendens). These shelters only house a single family and are suitable for a nomadic lifestyle. This type of construction is used for traditional festivals as well.

== Territory and ecology ==
The current territory of the Comcaac has a total area of 211,000 ha (520,000 acres), of which 91,000 ha (220,000 acres) were provided through ejido rights and 120,000 ha (300,000 acres) were provided through communal endowment. Due to the territorial extension with which they were endowed and their small population, the Seri, along with the Lacandones, can be considered the Indigenous people with the greatest land possession in Mexico. However, the difficult environmental conditions of their land makes it very hard for the Seri to utilize their territory for agricultural purposes. Due to this, the Seri have never practiced agriculture throughout their history.

In general, the surface of Seri territory is flat, apart from some elevations like the Seri mountain range, the Kunkaak mountain range, and some parts of the coastline. The soil of the land is generally shallow and in some parts up to 80% stoney. In the valleys, the soil is loamy and sandy. Due to the permeable characteristics of the soil there are no rivers, lakes, or important currents except for the San Ignacio river that runs from the nearby mountains and ends near Desemboque, but this river is still temporary and has a weak flow. Tiburon Island is provided with five watering holes in total which are currently not enough to sustain the total population.

The climate of the region is hot with rainfall of 75 to 200 mm (3.0 to 7.9 in) per year; the primary climate is extremely dry or desert conditions. The temperature of the region can reach minimums of −8.5 °C (16.7 °F) in the winter months of December to February and highs of 49.5 °C (121.1 °F) between the months of June and August. With such dramatic regional characteristics, the development of agriculture has been impossible up to now and maintaining livestock has been difficult due to water scarcity. Therefore, the main resource that is relied on is the 100 km (62 mi) of coastline that the Seri have for their own exclusive use. Despite the aridity of the desert, the Seri have knowledge of how to exploit the flora and fauna of the area. Fishing, particularly harvesting crabs and scallops, along with traditional ironwood carvings, elaborate basket making, and necklace work have been the main sources of income for the Seri. In general, Seri are not used to leaving their territory in search of work.

== Social organization ==
The Seri came to establish systems of reciprocity and resource distribution through kinship relationships which ensure the total survival of the group. One of these systems is named quiimosim, which gives every member of the tribe the right to request part of the food that is consumed in the community without prior invitation. Another is canoaa an hant cooit, the right to ask for fish to eat from any panga that comes from the sea. Through an additionally complex system, assets are also shared between families.

With the formal integration of the Comcaac into national life, they have been forced to name a series of authorities such as a supreme council, a communal commission, the comunal property council, and a fishing cooperative society.

== Cosmology and religion ==
The Seri did not develop a complex system of religious governance. Their interpretation of the world, its rites, its festivals, and other cultural manifestations are closely related to nature and the biological and social aspects of the group.

Their main traditional rites are linked to the onset of puberty and death. Their songs and stories revolve around the sea, animals, and ancient feats of heroes and warriors. Not having been formally evangelized in colonial times, they do not have the Catholic elements that many other Indigenous groups have.

In the Seri area there are no Catholic churches or priests. There are two Protestant temples of the Apostolic Church of the Faith of Jesus Christ, a church that many people in the community belong to. Despite the cultural mix, they maintain their language and cultural practices.

== Music ==
The Seri have preserved much of their Indigenous music, which distinguished them from almost all other ethnic groups in Mexico. Instrumental music and most traditional instruments are less commonly in use but songs are still an important part of Seri culture. Instruments like foot drums or rattling gourds may be used to accompany quick and repetitive Seri singing. The rhythms and percussion provided by dancers may also be used to accompany songs.

Singing is a cultural tradition practiced by many Seri of all ages in order to describe the world around them. Some songs even feature knowledge of their ecological environment and the ethnobotanical aspects of their culture which has allowed them to survive under difficult environmental conditions. While there are virtually no written records kept by the Seri, their songs have served as libraries of knowledge about their history, beliefs, and culture. Songs are often repeated, with many songs being sung in quantities of four.

There are various types of songs, but not all are well represented in modern day and others are more commonly heard in public performances. The most interesting ones are often sung in private situations. The Seri are reluctant to formally record many songs, including many songs of mourning, because they either believe they should not be performed out of context or they are too personal.

The types of songs include:

1. icoosyat 'songs of the giants'
2. iquimooni 'songs of victory"
3. icooha 'songs of mourning'
4. hacáatol cöicoos 'songs of the shaman'
5. cmaam cöicoos 'love songs to women'
6. icocooxa 'lullabies'
7. xepe án cöicoos and hehe án cöicoos 'songs of nature'
8. icoos icooit 'songs for dance' (which is the most visible type of song because it can be seen at various cultural events, however, it is also the least typical of the Seri.)

== Ethnonym ==
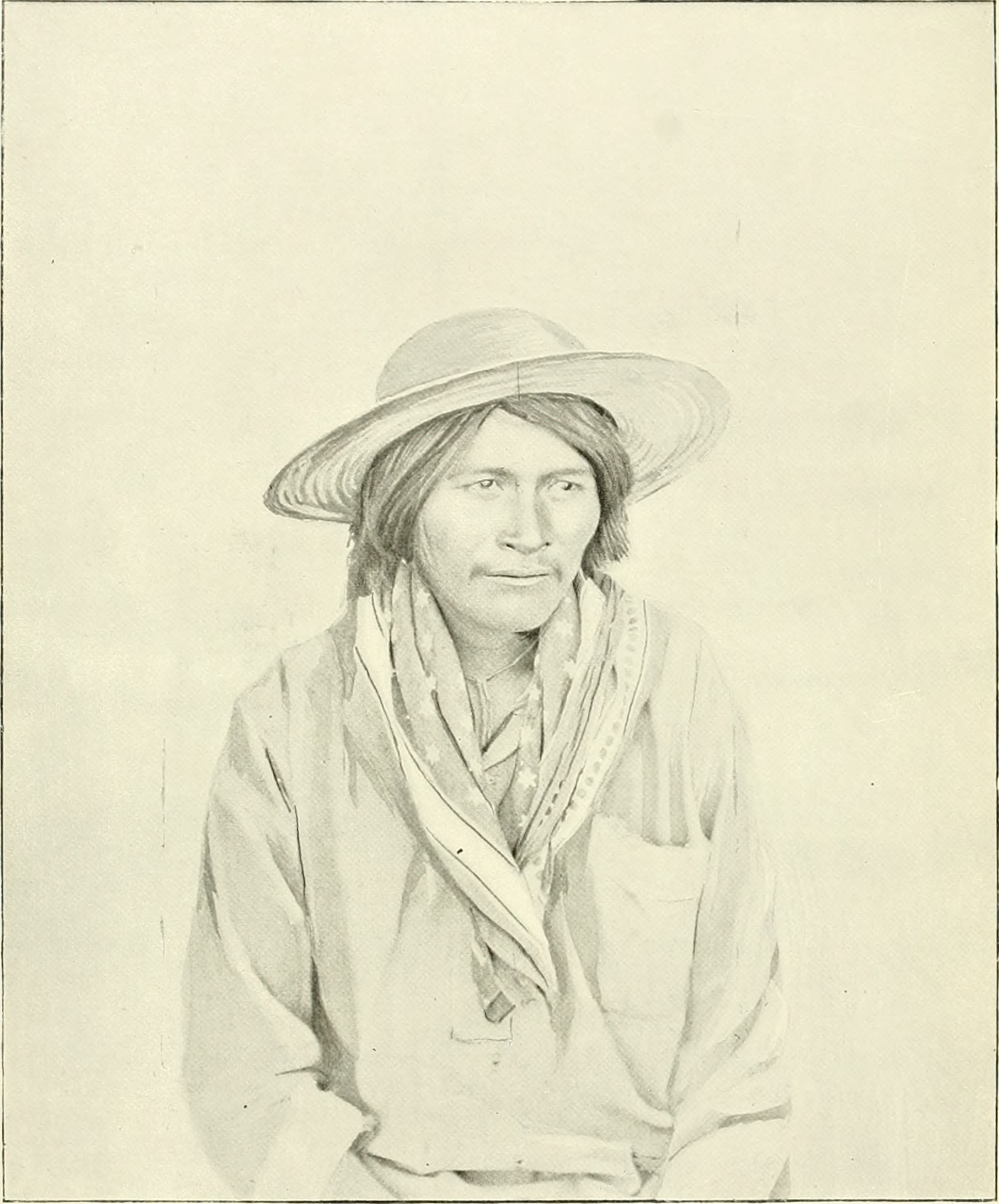
Mashem, a Seri interpreter. Picture from a 1895 report from the Bureau of American Ethnology.

The ethnonym of the Seri people, Comcaac, was first recorded by United States Boundary Commissioner John Russell Bartlett, who was in the area for a short visit in early 1852. The word was included in the list of approximately 180 words that Bartlett archived in the Bureau of American Ethnology (now part of the National Anthropological Archive, housed at the Smithsonian). He recorded the word as "komkak", which reflected the pronunciation of the word at that time (although he missed the vowel length and did not indicate stress). Other word lists, obtained by other people during the last half of the nineteenth century, confirm that pronunciation. The phonetic rule by which the consonant /m/ is pronounced as a velar nasal in this context (after an unstressed vowel and preceding a velar consonant) may not have come about until sometime in the early twentieth century or researchers may have encountered slow-speech deliberate pronunciations for which the assimilation was held in abeyance. The singular form, Cmiique, was first recorded by French explorer and philologist Alphonse Pinart in 1879. He recorded the word as "kmike", which must have reflected the pronunciation of the word at that time (although he also missed the vowel length). The phonetic rule by which the consonant /m/ is pronounced as a nasalized velar approximant in this context (after a velar stop) may not have come about until sometime in the mid twentieth century.

== In media ==
- A 1940 documentary film, part of John Nesbitt's Passing Parade series, recorded scenes from the life of the Seri on Tiburón Island, under the title "Utopia of Death." It uses film from the Harold Austin expedition, claiming that this was the first motion picture footage of the tribe.
- The ethnologist and writer Francisco Rojas González published his novel Lola Casanova in 1947. Based on this work, the film director Matilde Landeta shot the homonymous film in 1948. The argument is about the fact that at the end of the 19th century, the protagonist Lola and her companions are assaulted on a road by a band of Seris Indians commanded by the chief Coyote Iguana. The young woman, a descendant of Catalans, is the only survivor of the attack; she remains in the care of the women of the tribe, and she will spend the rest of her life in that community in the Sonoran Desert. The character did exist in real life.
- The Seri figure in the plot of the Louis L'Amour novel Catlow (1963), made into a (1971) movie by the same name.
- A Seri family is featured in the final episode of La fuerza del destino (2011).
- The Seri people are mentioned in the novel “The Savage Detectives” by Roberto Bolaño on page 621. They are seen as a group of fishermen in the back of a pickup truck singing their song.

== Diet ==
The Seri are the only people known to have harvested the maritime Zostera marina seagrass species for its seeds, before their nutritional value was discovered in recent times.

== Bibliography ==
- Bowen, Thomas (1983). "Seri". Handbook of North American Indians, William C. Sturtevant, General Editor. Southwest. Alfonso Ortiz, Volume Editor. Smithsonian Institution, Washington, D.C.: 230–249.
- Bowen, Thomas; Mary Beck Moser (1995). "Seri". Encyclopedia of World Cultures, David Levinson, Editor in Chief. Middle America and the Caribbean. James W. Dow (Volume Editor) & Robert V. Kemper (Associate Volume Editor). Boston: G. K. Hall.: 232–235.
- Bowen, Thomas (2001). Unknown Island: Seri Indians, Europeans, and San Esteban Island in the Gulf of California. Albuquerque: University of New Mexico Press.
- Davis, Edward H.; Dawson, E. Yale (March 1945). "The Savage Seris of Sonora—I". The Scientific Monthly. 60 (3): 193–202. Bibcode:1945SciMo..60..193D.
- Davis, Edward H.; Dawson, E. Yale (April 1945). "The Savage Seris of Sonora—II". The Scientific Monthly. 60 (4): 261–268. Bibcode:1945SciMo..60..261D.
- Johnston, Bernice (1980) [1970]. The Seri Indians of Sonora Mexico. Tucson, Arizona: University of Arizona Press.
- Felger, Richard; Mary Beck Moser (July 1973). "Eelgrass (Zostera marina L.) in the Gulf of California: Discovery of Its Nutritional Value by the Seri Indians". Science. 181 (4097): 355–356. Bibcode:1973Sci...181..355F. doi:10.1126/science.181.4097.355. PMID 17832031. S2CID 32062339.
- Felger, Richard; Mary B. Moser. (1985). People of the desert and sea: ethnobotany of the Seri Indians. Tucson: University of Arizona Press. ISBN 9780816508181.
- Ives, Ronald L. (July 1962). "The Legend of the "White Queen" of the Seri". Western Folklore. 21 (3). Western States Folklore Society: 161–164. doi:10.2307/1496954. JSTOR 1496954.
- Marlett, Cathy Moser (2014). Shells on a desert shore: Mollusks in the Seri world. Tucson: University of Arizona Press.
- Marlett, Stephen A. (2011). "The Seris and the Comcaac: Sifting fact from fiction about the names and relationships". Work Papers of the Summer Institute of Linguistics, University of North Dakota Session. #51: 1–20 .
- Marlett, Stephen A. (2006). "La situación sociolingüística de la lengua seri en 2006" (PDF). Situaciones sociolingüísticas de lenguas amerindias. Lima: SIL International and Universidad Ricardo Palma.
- Marlett, Stephen A.; F. Xavier Moreno Herrera; Genaro G. Herrera Astorga (2005). "Illustrations of the IPA: Seri" (PDF). Journal of the International Phonetic Association. 35 (1): 117–121. doi:10.1017/S0025100305001933.
- Moser, Edward W. (1963). "Seri Bands". The Kiva. 28 (3): 14–27. doi:10.1080/00231940.1963.11757641. (online Spanish version)
- Moser, Mary B.; Stephen A. Marlett (2005). Comcáac quih yaza quih hant ihíip hac: Diccionario seri-español-inglés (PDF) (in Spanish and English). Hermosillo, Sonora: Universidad de Sonora and Plaza y Valdés Editores.
- McGee, W. J. (March 1896). "Expedition to Papagueria and Seriland: A Preliminary Note". American Anthropologist. 9 (3): 93–98. doi:10.1525/aa.1896.9.3.02a00010.
- McGee, W. J. (April 1896). "Expedition to Seriland". Science. 3 (66): 493–505. Bibcode:1896Sci.....3..493M. doi:10.1126/science.3.66.493. PMID 17751332.
- McGee, W. J. (1898). The Seri Indians: Seventeenth annual report of the Bureau of American Ethnology to the Secretary of the Smithsonian Institution. Washington, D.C.
- Nabhan, Gary (2003). Singing the Turtles to Sea: The Comcáac (Seri) Art and Science of Reptiles. University of California Press.
- Resendez, Andres (2016). The Other Slavery: The Uncovered Story of Indian Enslavement in America. Houghton Mifflin Harcourt. p. 448. ISBN 978-0544602670.
- Spicer, Edward H. (1986) [1962]. Cycles of Conquest . The Impact of Spain, Mexico and the United States on the Indians of the Southwest, 1533 - 1960 publisher: The University of Arizona Press, Tucson.
