= El Desemboque =

Town in Sonora, Mexico

Coordinates: 29°30′18″N 112°23′44″W

El Desemboque (Seri: Haxöl Iihom) is a town located 376 km from Hermosillo on the shore of Gulf of California in the Mexican state of Sonora; coordinates N 29° 30' 13", W 112° 23' 43". It is part of the Municipality of Pitiquito, and is one of two major villages on the Seri Indian communal property, the other being Punta Chueca. The Spanish name refers to the fact that the (generally dry) Río San Ignacio meets the sea near that point. The Seri name is literally where the clams lie. It has been a good location to find the small clams Protothaca grata (haxöl). According to the Mexican census of 2010, the town (officially a locality, or localidad) had a population of 287 inhabitants. (The town of El Desemboque described in the prior text is not located in the Pitiquito municipality of Sonora. It is a Seri village about 120 km north of Punta Chueca north of Bahia Kino where the dry Rio Ignacio meets the Gulf of California. The El Desemboque in Pitiquito is west of Caborca at the mouth of Rio Concepcion and is a small village catering to weekenders from Caborca. The Seri (Kunka'ak) may have lived at the El Desemboque (river mouth) west of present-day Caborca in prehistoric times before Spanish arrived as well as the current Seri town north of Bahia Kino. Their oral history has them living as far north as present day Puerto Penasco which was also an O'Odham settlement as well as present-day Bahia Kino and Isla Tiburon (shark island).)

== History ==
El Desemboque is thought to have been originally located about 2 kilometers to the north of its present location. At some point, probably in the 1930s, it was moved to its current location which offered better protection for the developing fleet of small skiffs (local Spanish, pangas) that the Seris used for commercial fishing. El Desemboque was the center of political and cultural activities until the early 1970s. After the construction of the highway linking Bahía de Kino to Hermosillo by the year 1953 (Sonora State Highway 100), the small community of Punta Chueca to the south (and closer to Bahía de Kino) rose in prominence to become the focal point of Seri political life.

El Desemboque remains a thriving community with commercial fishing and artisanal crafts as the two major economic activities. The village is home to a primary school, cultural center and small clinic as well as one of Mexico's oldest fishing cooperatives.
