= Bahía de Kino =

Town in Sonora, Mexico

Native name: Spanish: Bahía de Kino, Bahía Kino
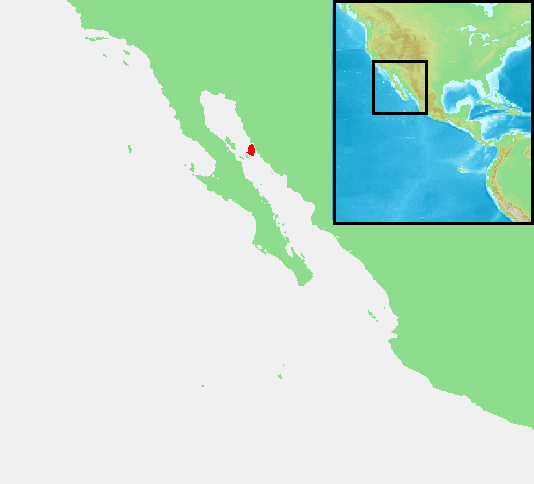
- Location of Bahía de Kino Punta San Nicolás

- Location within Mexico

Geography
- Location: Gulf of California
- Coordinates: 28°49′00″N 111°56′00″W

Administration
- Mexico
- State: Sonora

Demographics
- Population: 7,000 (2008)

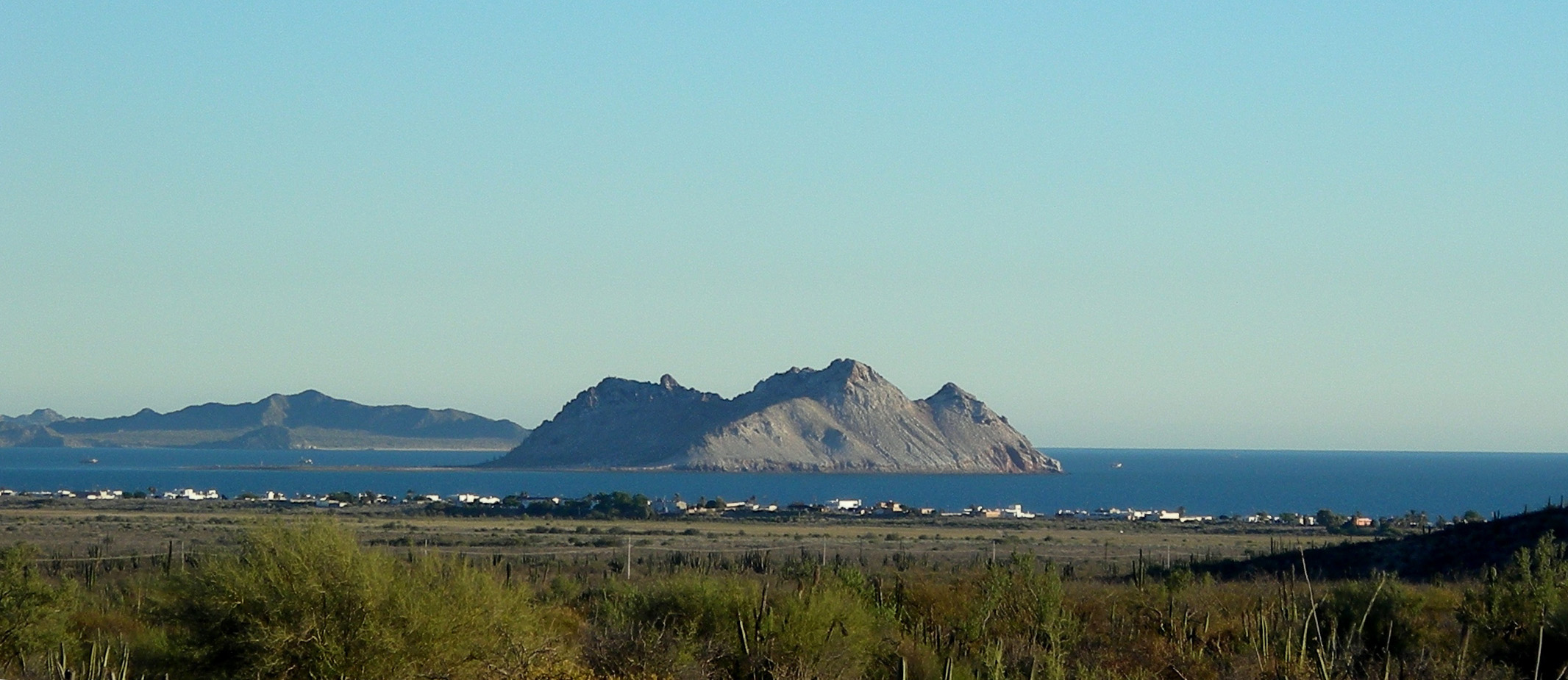
View of Isla del Alcatraz and Kino Nuevo.

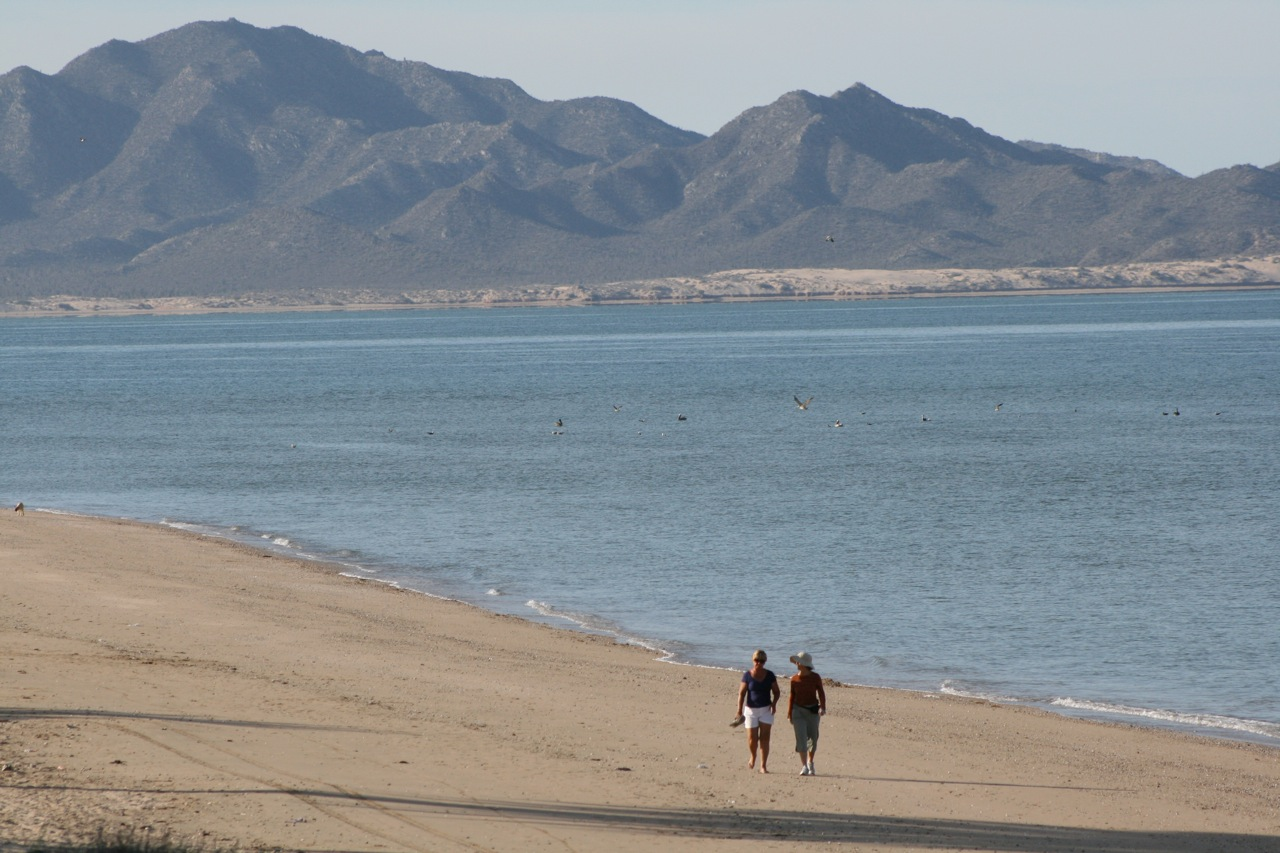
Kino beach stroll

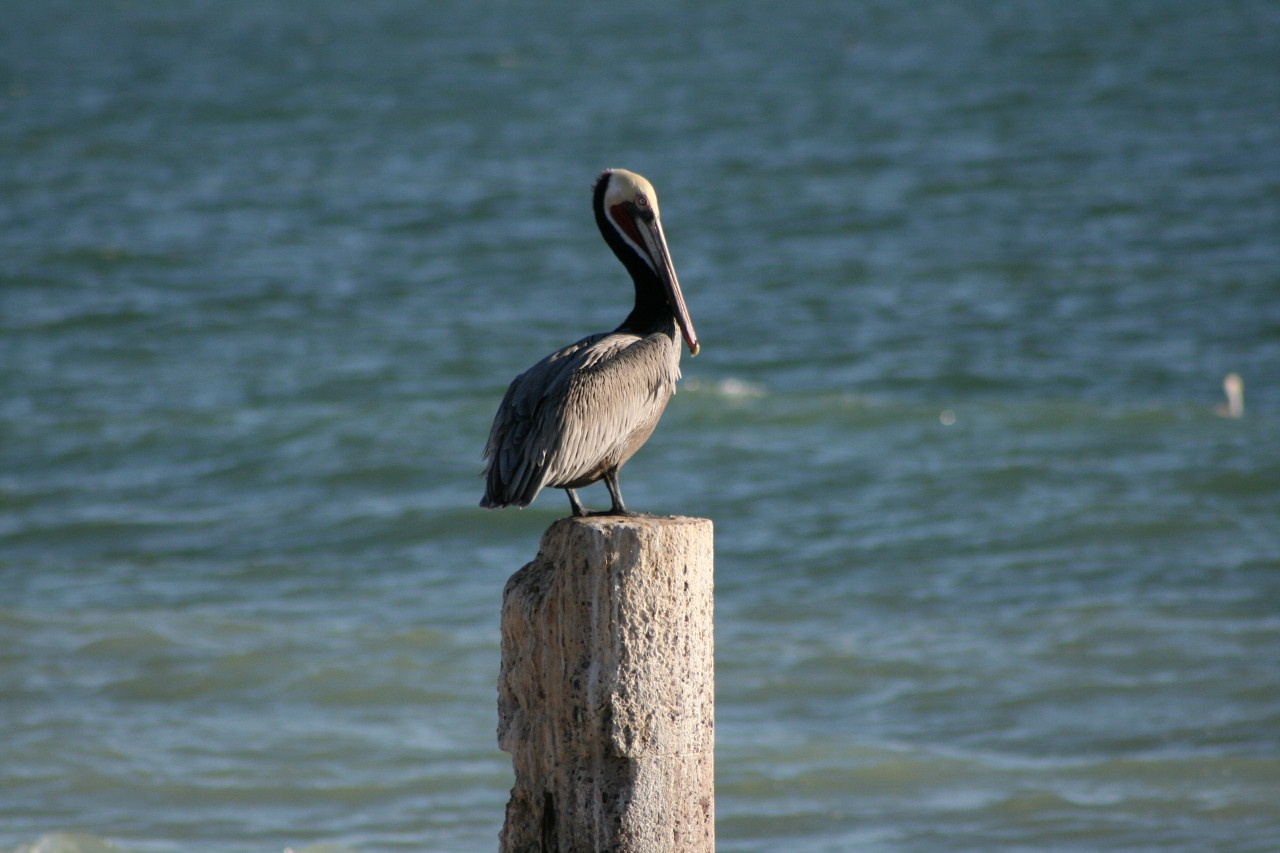
Pelican at Kino Bay

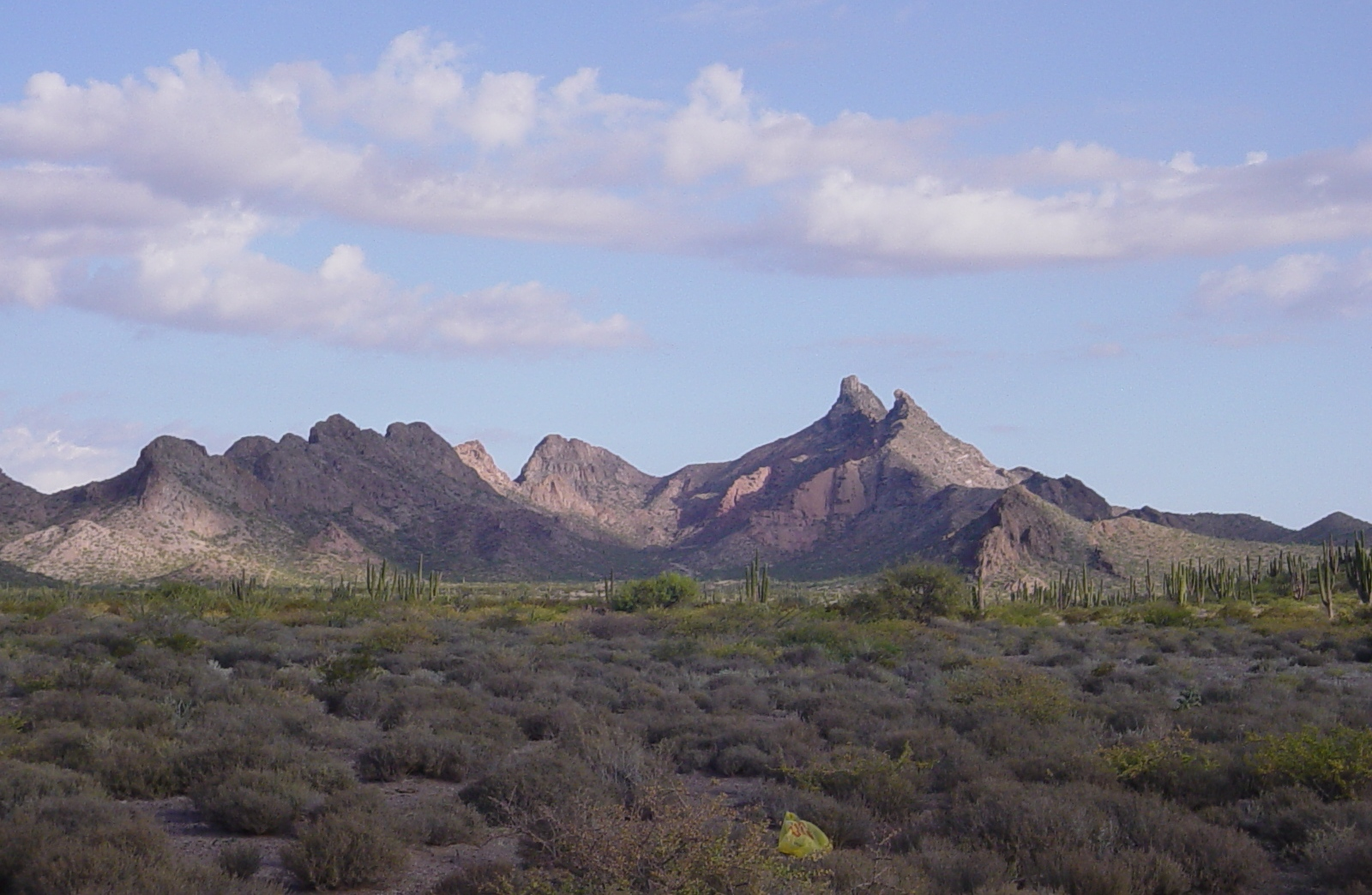
Hasteecöla peaks which overlook west end of New Kino

Bahía de Kino is a town in Hermosillo Municipality, Sonora, Mexico on the Gulf of California; it was named after Eusebio Kino. It has a population of approximately 7,000 people. The name also applies to the adjacent bay between Tiburón Island and Punta San Nicolás, Sonora. The names Bahía de Kino, Bahía Kino and Kino Bay are used interchangeably.

== History ==
The historic residents of the Bahía de Kino region were probably first documented in notes taken by Padre Eusebio Kino during his travels to the region in 1685 when he believed he visited the bay and named it Bahía San Juan Bautista (Doode, 1999). The local indigenous population was widely dispersed in small hunter-gatherer groups ranging from the Guaymas area as far north as present day Puerto Libertad. They called themselves Comcaac (Seri). The harsh environment of the coastal region dictated that the Comcaac live with a high degree of flexibility and resourcefulness, a characteristic that allowed them to remain free of contact with, and exploitation by, the Spaniards.

Although later Spanish expeditions to the region undertook to develop contacts with the various Comcaac groups, it is apparent from the record that the Comcaac remained autonomous and were never formally conquered (Griffen, 1959). It was not until they formed economic bonds out of necessity – probably the need to purchase gasoline for outboard motors used on their small wooden boats during the late 1950s – that they started down the path of social and economic integration into wider Mexican culture (Felger & Moser 1991, Weaver et al. 2003). Wandering groups of Comcaac routinely passed through the Kino area, using cave shelters in the vicinity though there is scant evidence of any permanent presence in the immediate area.

The first mestizo settlers in the Bahía de Kino area arrived in the early 1920s to establish a small fishing camp near the site of the present day town. Fishing activity centered on the Totoaba (Totoaba macdonaldi) a species much sought after and reported as abundant around nearby Isla Alcatraz (Chute, 1928, Bahre 2000, Doode 1999).

In 1922, Yates Holmes, an American, secured a federal concession for almost 6,000 acres (24 km^{2}) of land in Bahía de Kino and developed a hunting and fishing camp that became known as the Kino Bay Club. It operated through 1931(Bowen 2000). The Kino Bay Club marked the beginning of a long history of association between the Mexican residents of Bahía de Kino and visitors from the United States.

In 1935 the first fisher cooperative – La Sociedad Cooperativa de Produccíon Pesquera Lázaro Cárdenas – was formed with 25 members (probably comprising most of the adult male population on Bahía de Kino at the time).

The late 1930s saw the rapid development of the shark fishery that supplied shark liver oil to the U.S. for use in the production of vitamin A supplements (Doode 1999, Bahre & Bourillon 2002). By 1945 the population had grown considerably to about 500 inhabitants all of whom were involved primarily with fisheries (Weaver et al. 2003). The region in general was growing as well. The establishment of the local Distrito de Colonización Presidente Miguel Alemán between Hermosillo and Bahía de Kino coupled with the recent availability of subterranean water pumping technology allowed for large scale, regional agrarian development.

The mid-1940s marked the beginning the industrial shrimp fishery in the Gulf of California. Shrimp boats, usually displacing less than 100 tons, and operating primarily out of Guaymas, began trawling for shrimp in the waters of Bahía de Kino. These boats were generally crewed by fishers from Guaymas and, initially at least, had little interaction with fishers from the Kino area (Weaver et al. 2003).

Felger and Moser report that by 1952 Kino Bay "...was a fishing village with less than a hundred inhabitants, several bars, no school and no electricity." (1985, p. 17).

In 1953, the road to Hermosillo was paved (Bowen 2000) allowing for increased sales of fisheries products and easier access to lucrative state and national markets. 245 hectares of federal land were set aside that year for the growth of the village while an additional 868 hectares was designated to be developed into lots for tourist infrastructure. It was hoped that this would generate employment opportunities outside the fishery for Kino residents in the construction and service sectors of the local economy (Wong 1999).

The 1960s witnessed the early development of the scallop (callo) fishery in the bay. The sand banks in the south of the bay were a primary source of callo with fishers free diving from their boats to harvest the abundant callo beds in the immediate area. Around 1974, the first air compressor diving rigs were developed (Cudney-Bueno 2000). The use of air compressors allowed fishers to operate at greater depths and for longer periods of time, increasing productivity per outing (Doode 1999).

The 1970s saw a dramatic increase in the population of Bahía de Kino during which the town grew from just a few hundred residents to several thousand. Most of the new residents were immigrants to the region, some from as far south as Michoacán, other from the deserts of Chihuahua and Coahuila. Most had little fishing or boating experience, the developing fishery offered steady employment at a time when many of Mexico's rural ejidos or cooperative farming and ranching communities were suffering economic setbacks and low productivity (Simon 1997). In 1975, the Mexican government placed a ban on totoaba fishing – the fishery had been decimated, primarily due to over-fishing at spawning grounds at the mouth of the Colorado River (Bahre & Bourillon 2002).

In the late 1970s a plan was proposed to build a marina and marine service center in the nearby Laguna Santa Cruz. A dock and ramp were constructed, a trailerpark developed and a channel dredged through the barrier bars across the mouth of the laguna. The project is said to have bankrupted itself. Remains of the dredge are still visible in the laguna. The dredged channel is still usable by vessels drawing less than 1.5 meters but local knowledge is essential for entry as there are no aids to navigation associated with the canal.

From the early 1980s through until the late 1990s the Bahía de Kino fishery increased both in intensity and extent. More fishers in more boats operating over an ever-increasing area kept regional production levels in positive growth. The national economic crisis during this period resulted in a new influx of immigrants to the area (Doode 1999).

Trapping for crab (Callinectes bellicosus) became an important addition to Kino fishing effort starting about 1990 (Weaver et al. 2003). It is unclear if Kineño fishers had utilized benthic trapping technology prior to the development of the crab fishery.

Several shrimp mariculture operations began operations around the Bahía de Kino area in the late 1990s and into the present. The local socioeconomic impact of these operations has not been studied. It is unknown if local fishers have interacted with these operations in any economically meaningful way.

In 2006, a plan for development of a marina in Kino Bay was approved by the state governor's office. The location was centered on the existing ramp facilities north of Kino Nuevo. Little development of this plan has occurred however. The ramps have been rebuilt several times after sustaining damage from hurricanes over the years.

== Climate ==
Bahía de Kino has a desert climate (Köppen climate classification BWh).

Climate data for Bahía de Kino, Sonora (1981–2010, extremes (1974-present)
Month	Jan	Feb	Mar	Apr	May	Jun	Jul	Aug	Sep	Oct	Nov	Dec	Year
Record high °C (°F)	29.0 (84.2)	30.0 (86.0)	33.0 (91.4)	38.0 (100.4)	40.0 (104.0)	47.0 (116.6)	42.0 (107.6)	41.5 (106.7)	42.0 (107.6)	38.0 (100.4)	35.0 (95.0)	29.0 (84.2)	47.0 (116.6)
Mean daily maximum °C (°F)	19.5 (67.1)	21.3 (70.3)	22.7 (72.9)	25.2 (77.4)	27.3 (81.1)	30.9 (87.6)	32.6 (90.7)	33.5 (92.3)	33.0 (91.4)	28.8 (83.8)	23.7 (74.7)	20.3 (68.5)	26.6 (79.9)
Daily mean °C (°F)	13.2 (55.8)	14.4 (57.9)	15.7 (60.3)	18.2 (64.8)	20.5 (68.9)	24.7 (76.5)	28.1 (82.6)	28.7 (83.7)	27.5 (81.5)	22.2 (72.0)	17.0 (62.6)	13.8 (56.8)	20.3 (68.5)
Mean daily minimum °C (°F)	6.9 (44.4)	7.5 (45.5)	8.7 (47.7)	11.2 (52.2)	13.6 (56.5)	18.5 (65.3)	23.6 (74.5)	23.9 (75.0)	22.1 (71.8)	15.7 (60.3)	10.2 (50.4)	7.2 (45.0)	14.1 (57.4)
Record low °C (°F)	−1.0 (30.2)	−4.0 (24.8)	2.0 (35.6)	3.0 (37.4)	5.5 (41.9)	9.0 (48.2)	17.0 (62.6)	16.0 (60.8)	12.0 (53.6)	7.0 (44.6)	2.0 (35.6)	0.0 (32.0)	−4.0 (24.8)
Average precipitation mm (inches)	12.5 (0.49)	7.0 (0.28)	3.1 (0.12)	1.2 (0.05)	0.4 (0.02)	2.2 (0.09)	15.3 (0.60)	50.9 (2.00)	23.0 (0.91)	12.5 (0.49)	5.5 (0.22)	27.7 (1.09)	161.3 (6.35)
Average precipitation days (≥ 0.1 mm)	2.5	1.3	0.5	0.5	0.1	0.3	2.5	3.3	1.9	0.9	1.3	2.5	17.6
Source: Servicio Meteorológico Nacional

== Present ==
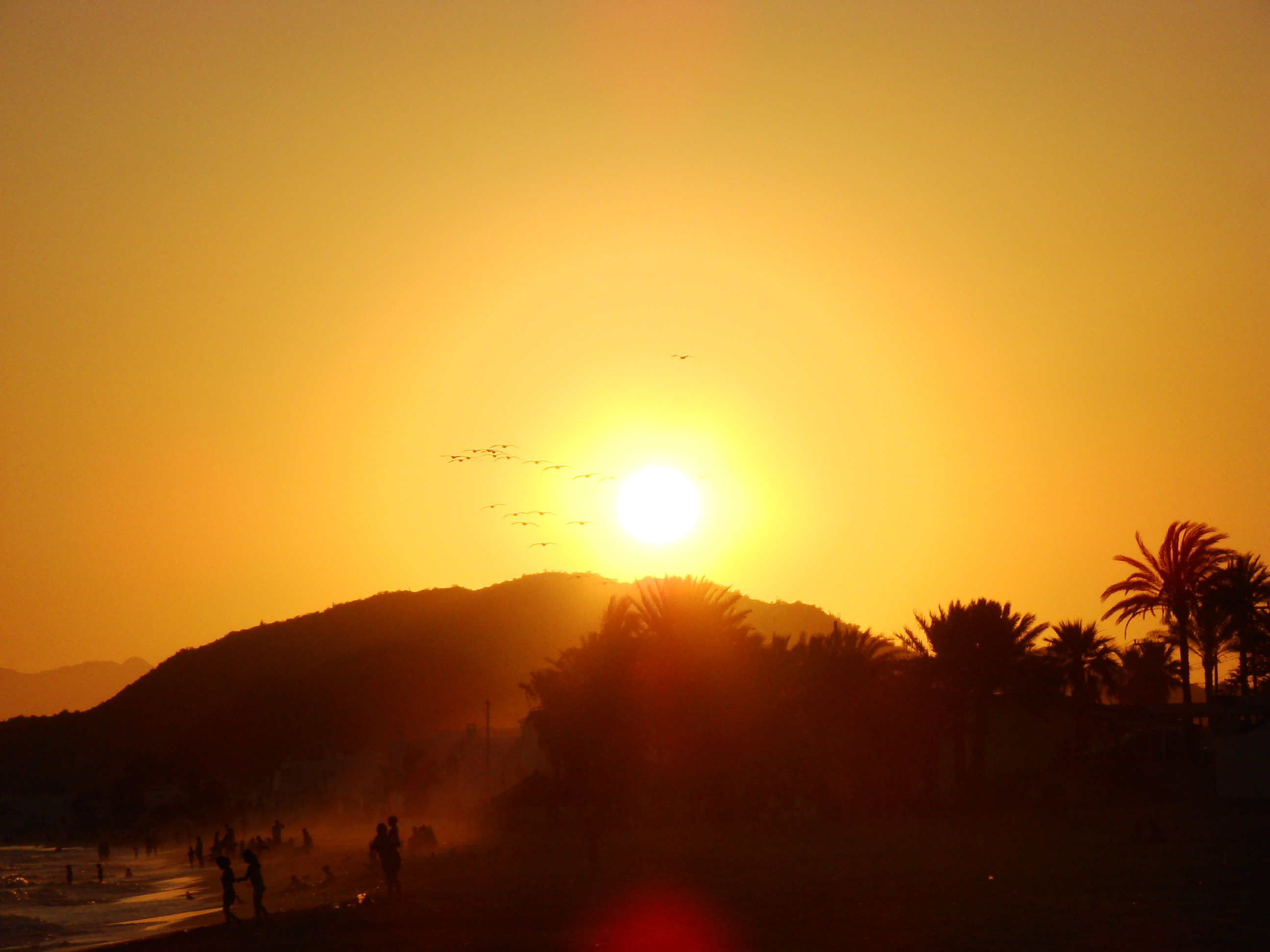
Summer sunset at Kino beach

Bahía de Kino is home to between 6,000 and 8,000 permanent residents. The area is visited by both local and international tourists. There is a small, but active population of foreign residents, many of whom have built homes in town.

The town is administered as part of the municipality of Hermosillo. It is located on land that was part of the traditional territory of the Comcaac (Seri) people who now live to the north on their communal property.

Despite the town's location and economic importance, there are no harbor or port facilities (other than the Port Captain's office). All fishing activities are based at the beach to the southwest of town. Two public boat ramps are available; one South-east of town at Laguna La Cruz and a second 6 miles (9.7 km) north-west of town, called 'Playa Estela'. The historic ramp at the Islandia Marina camp in Kino Viejo has fallen into disrepair and is non-functional. There is open anchorage located to the south of Isla Alcatraz. The large Laguna La Cruz to the south east of town offers excellent anchoring and protection with access to town via a well maintained dirt road. An unmarked channel allows vessels drawing less than 2 meters easy access to this anchorage from the bay.

Local people differentiate between Kino Viejo ('Old Kino', the site of the original village and main commercial center today) and Kino Nuevo ('New Kino'). The latter refers to the homes, motels, RV parks, and restaurants that line the coast for several miles north-west of Kino Viejo.
