= Olegario Carrillo Meza =

Mexican politician

Member of the Congress of Sonora from the 20th district
- In office 16 September 1997 – 15 September 2000
- Preceded by: Lamberto Gálvez Díaz
- Succeeded by: Antonio Leyva Duarte

Municipal president of Etchojoa
- In office 1994–1997
- Preceded by: Octavio Sandoval Martínez
- Succeeded by: Pablo Antonio Cruz Ontiveros

Personal details
- Born: Nayarit, Mexico
- Citizenship: Mexican
- Party: PMS (former); PRD

Olegario Carrillo Meza is a Mexican politician representing the Party of the Democratic Revolution (PRD). He served in the LV Legislature of the Congress of Sonora from 1997 to 2000.

== Career ==
A native of Nayarit, Carrillo Meza earned a degree in agronomy engineering in the Soviet Union thanks to a scholarship from the Unión General de Obreros y Campesinos (General Union of Workers and Farmers). Upon his return to Mexico, he served as a regidor (city councillor) in Etchojoa, Sonora from 1988 to 1991 as a member of the Mexican Socialist Party (PMS), which merged into the Party of the Democratic Revolution (PRD). He was elected as the municipal president of Etchojoa Municipality in 1994, defeating Gildardo Grajeda of the Institutional Revolutionary Party (PRI) to become the first PRD candidate to win a municipal race in Sonora. During his term, the Congress of Sonora appropriated part of the municipality to create the Benito Juárez Municipality.

In 1997, Carrillo Meza was shortlisted by the PRD as a potential candidate in the gubernatorial election, but he declined in order to focus on campaigning for a spot in the state legislature. He won a seat in the LV Legislature of the Congress of Sonora representing the 20th district of Etchojoa, serving a three-year term from 1997 to 2000. He became popular among the indigenous populations in the Valle del Mayo and the Valle del Yaqui. He also unsuccessfully challenged for a seat in the LVIII Legislature of the Mexican Congress in 2000, losing to Arturo León Lerma.

Carrillo Meza left the PRD by endorsing PRI candidate Eduardo Bours for governor ahead of the 2003 election.

== Activism ==
Carrillo Meza founded the Unión Nacional de Organizaciones Regionales Campesinas y Autónomas (National Union of Farmers’ Regional Autonomous Organizations) in 1985 and has served as its national director since 2005. He has advocated for farmers' rights to combat poverty among rural and indigenous populations, particularly in response to NAFTA. He also called on the government to cancel their contracts with Monsanto to grow genetically modified crops in the country. On behalf of the union, he endorsed Claudia Pavlovich Arellano for governor of Sonora in 2015.

== Personal life ==
His wife, Flora Lina Mungarro Garibay, served as municipal president of Benito Juárez from 2018 to 2021.

There is a public library in Etchojoa named after him.
