= Sonora State Highway 155 =

Highway in Sonora, Mexico

State Highway 155
- Carretera estatal 155

Major junctions
- From: SH 147
- To: SH 176

Location
- Country: Mexico
- State: Sonora

Highway system
- Mexican Federal Highways; List; Autopistas; State Highways in Sonora

Sonora State Highway 155 (Carretera Estatal 155) is a highway in the south of the Mexican state of Sonora.

It runs from Sonora State Highway 147 east of San Ignacio Cohuirimpo to Sonora State Highway 176.
