= Navojoa Municipality =

Coordinates: 27.0817°N 109.4818°W

Navojoa
- Municipality
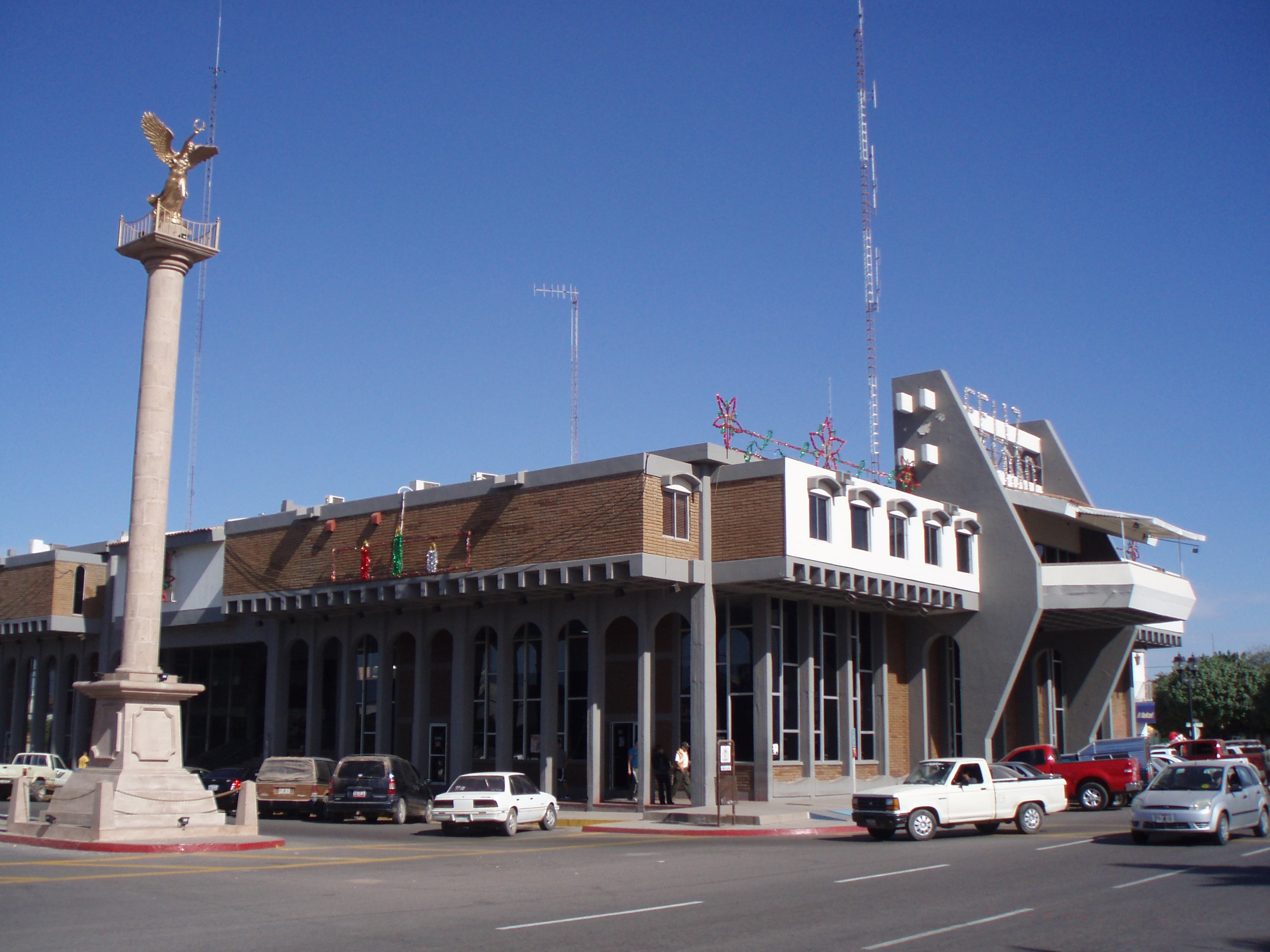
- Town hall

- Coat of arms

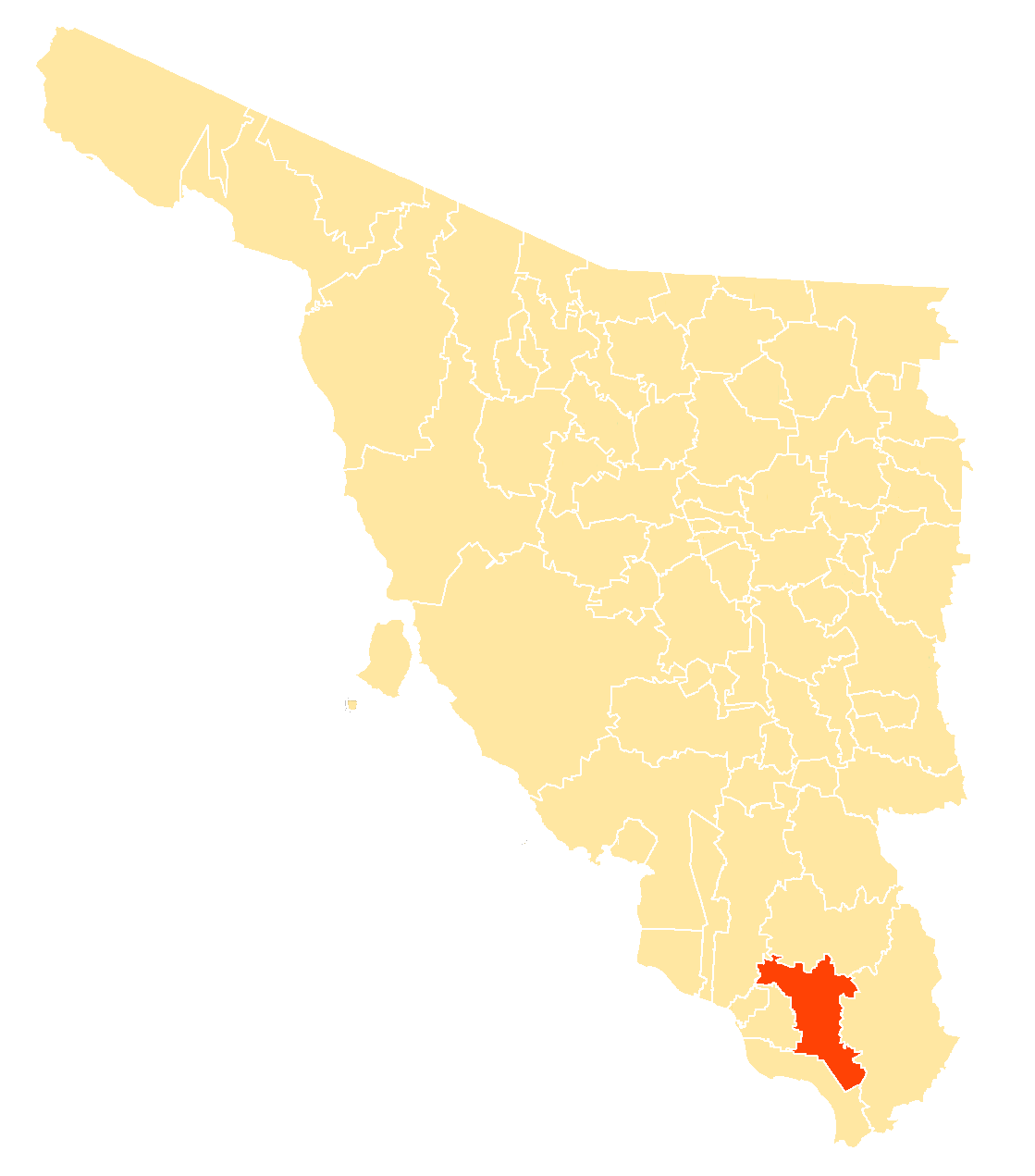
- Location of the municipality in Sonora
- Country: Mexico
- State: Sonora
- Seat: Navojoa

Population (2015)
  - Total: 163,650
- Time zone: UTC–07:00 (Zona Pacífico)
- Area code: +52 642

Navojoa is a municipality in the state of Sonora in north-western Mexico. As of 2015, the municipality had a total population of 163,650. The municipal seat is the city of Navojoa.

== Demographics ==
Navojoa is the fifth-largest municipality in Sonora (after Hermosillo, Cajeme, Nogales and San Luis Río Colorado) with a population of 163,650 as of 2015.

== Geography ==
=== Borders ===
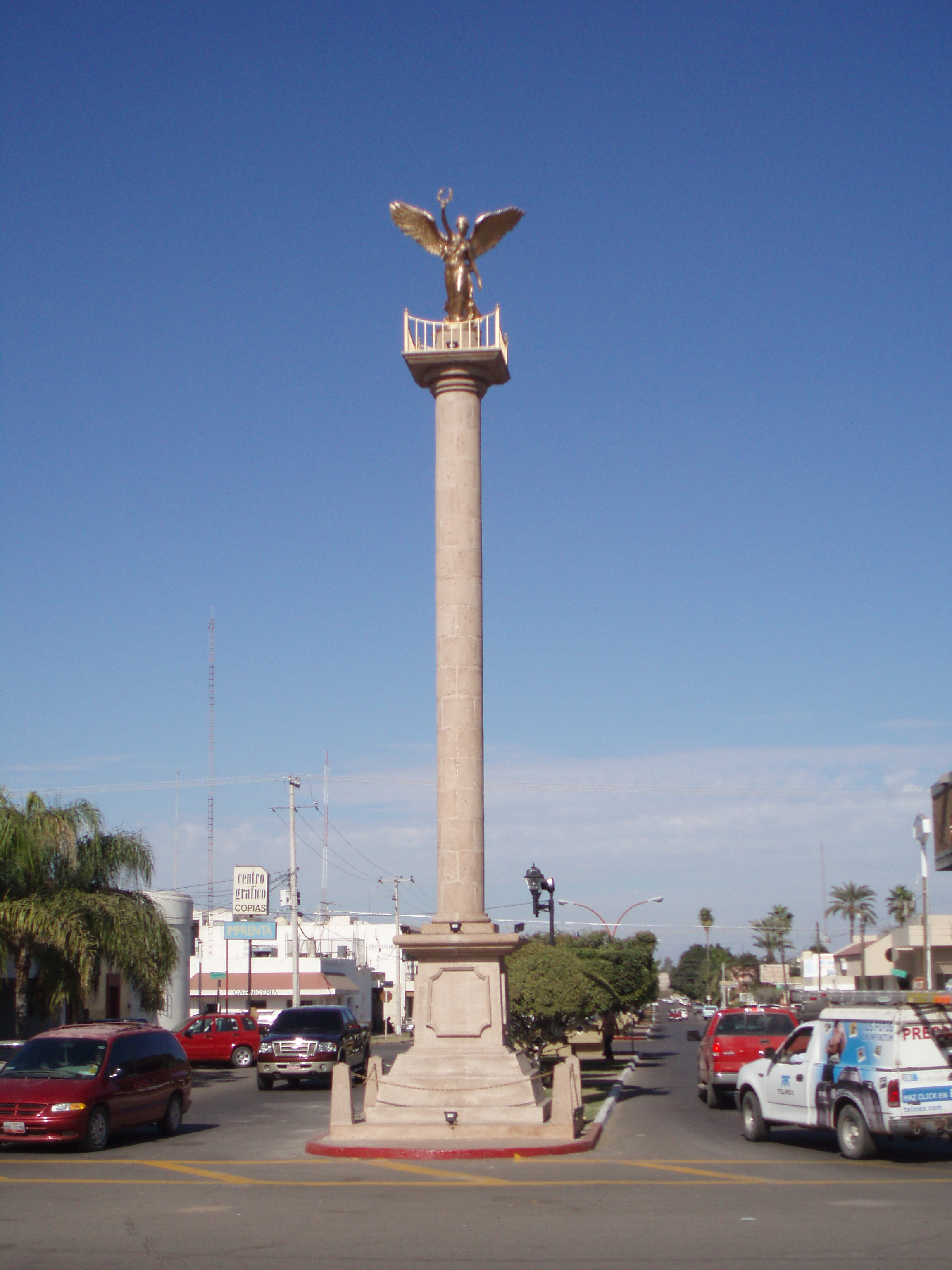
Winged Victory

The municipality shares its boundaries with Cajeme and Quiriego in the north, with Álamos in the east, with Huatabampo in the southwest and with Etchojoa in the west.

=== Localities ===
Other towns, near the municipal seat are San Ignacio Cohuirimpo, Guadalupe, Guayparin, Tetanchopo, Santa María del Bauraje, Agiabampo, Masiaca, Bacabachi, and Pueblo Viejo.

=== Physical geography ===
The region lies in the valley of the Mayo River, which crosses it from the northeast to the southwest.

== Transport ==
Transportation through the municipality is carried out by highway, railway, and airplane. Federal Highway 15 crosses the region from the northeast to the southeast. There is also an extensive network of tarmacked roads, connecting the municipal seat with the agricultural communities in the Mayo valley. The railway runs parallel to the national highway crossing the region. The Navojoa Airport is located in the municipality serving the city.

== Government ==
=== Municipal presidents ===
Term	Municipal president	Political party	Notes
1915–1916	Alejandro Velderráin Campoy		
1916–1918	Demetrio Esquer		
1918	Roque J. Ibarra		
1918	Inocente C. Amparán		
1918–1919	Ricardo Chávez		
1919–1920	Ignacio L. Gómez		
1920–1921	Francisco F. Ortiz		
1921–1922	Román Yocupicio Valenzuela		
1922–1923	Leobardo Tellechea		
1923–1924	Medardo Tellechea		
1924–1925	Jesús L. Almada		
1925	José Goycolea Gil		
1925–1926	Francisco Amparán		
1926–1927	Heroldo C. Bórquez		
1927	Rafael Vizcarra		
1927–1928	Porfirio Yepiz		
1928–1929	Juan J. Castillo		
1929–1931	Onécimo J. Aguilera	PNR	
1931–1932	Francisco Viscarra	PNR	
1932–1933	Tomás Siqueiros	PNR	
1933–1935	Juan Bautista Muñoz	PNR	
1935	Miguel Mendívil	PNR	
1935–1937	Pascual Contreras	PNR	
1937–1939	Crisóforo M. Vázquez	PNR; PRM	
1941–1943	Gerardo Romero	PRM	
1943–1944	Benito Bernal	PRM	
1944–1946	Alejo Aguilera Rojas	PRM	
1946–1949	Tomás Siqueiros	PRI	
1949–1952	Jorge R. Ibarra	PRI	
1952–1955	Carlos González Agraz	PRI	
1955–1958	Gerardo Campoy Campoy	PRI	
1958–1961	Rafael J. Almada	PRI	
1961–1964	Filiberto Cruz Mendívil	PRI	
1964–1966	Servando Monsiváis M.	PRI	
1966–1967	Roberto Talamante C.	PRI	
1967–1970	Luis Salido Quiroz	PRI	
1970–1973	Julio Martínez Bracamontes	PRI	
1973–1975	Samuel Ocaña García	PRI	
1975–1976	José de J. Dow Almada	PRI	
1976–1979	Daniel Acosta Cázares	PRI	
1979	Ángel R. Bours	PRI	Acting municipal president
1979	Ovidio Pereyda García	PRI	Acting municipal president
1979–1982	Luis Salido Ibarra	PRI	
1982–1985	Alfonso Rocha Moya	PRI	
1985–1988	Arturo León Lerma	PRI	
1988–1991	José Antonio Urbina Sánchez	PRI	
1991–1994	Ángel Robinson Bours Urrea	PRI	
1994–1997	Arsenio Duarte Murrieta	PRI	
1997–2000	Rafael Carlos Quiroz Narváez	PRD	
2000–2003	José Guadalupe Curiel	PRD	
2003–2006	Gustavo Mendívil Amparán	PRI	
2006–2009	Onésimo Mariscales Delgadillo	PRI; Panal	Alliance PRI Sonora-Panal
2009–2012	José Abraham Mendívil López	PRI; PVEM; Panal	
2012–2015	Alberto Natanael Guerrero López	PRI; PVEM	
2015–23-03-2018	Raúl Augusto Silva Vela	PAN	He applied for a leave in order to seek the PAN candidacy for the 7th federal electoral district of Sonora
24-03-2018–15-09-2018	Leticia Navarro Duarte	PAN	Acting municipal president
16-09-2018–2021	María del Rosario Quintero Borbón	PT; Morena; PES	Coalition "Together We Will Make History"
2021–20-01-2023	Mario Martín Martínez Bojórquez	Morena	Died in office
09-02-2023–2024	Jorge Alberto Elías Retes	Morena	Acting municipal president
2024–	Jorge Alberto Elías Retes	Morena; PVEM; PT; Panal Sonora PES Sonora	

== Economy ==
One quarter of the municipality (1,160 km^{2}) is occupied by irrigated agricultural lands, growing wheat, corn, soybeans, and garden vegetables.

There is also large production of swine and poultry. Navojoa produces almost half of the state production in these areas. The cattle herd had over 30,000 head according to the 2000 census.

Industry is modest, although there are one beer factory, owned by Cerveceria Cuauhtemoc Moctezuma / Heineken, and a cardboard packing factory named Celulosa y Corrugados de Sonora, S.A. de C.V.
