= Carlos Conant Maldonado =

Mexican businessman, politician (1842–1907)

Municipal president of Ocampo, Chihuahua
- In office 1883–1883

Personal details
- Born: Charles Conant Maldonado; 20 January 1842; Guaymas, Sonora, Mexico
- Died: 5 February 1907 (aged 65); Guaymas, Sonora
- Spouse: María Jesús Montijo
- Parent(s): Charles Rich Conant; Simona Maldonado
- Occupation: businessman, colonel, politician

Charles Conant Maldonado (20 January 1842 – 5 February 1907) was a Mexican businessman, colonel, and politician, one of the founders of the Sonora-Sinaloa Irrigation Company (SSIC) along with his brother Joseph Benjamin (Benito) Conant Maldonado and Santos Valenzuela, a businessman from the agricultural town Cócorit, Sonora. In 1883 he was municipal president of Ocampo, Chihuahua, after Sonoran Governor Ignacio Pesqueira banished him from Sonora in 1873, for having taken up arms against him.

== Military period ==
A supporter of General Porfirio Díaz since a few days after he launched his Plan de la Noria, on 8 November 1871, Colonel Conant supported without hesitation the proclamation and the call to take up arms against the government of the reelected President Benito Juárez according to the final ruling of 7 October 1871 by the scrutinizing commission of the 1871 Mexican general election.

== Business history ==
From a young age he was very hardworking. He devoted himself to livestock and agriculture on his hacienda in Huatabampo, Sonora, which he lost when took up arms against Governor Ignacio Pesqueira, after proclamation of his Plan of the Promontories, on 2 September 1873, for which he was exiled from Sonora for ten years.

=== Mining businessman and municipal president of Ocampo, Chihuahua ===
In the aforementioned year of 1873 he settled in the mineral of Ocampo, in the State of Chihuahua, very close to the Sonoran municipality of Yécora. He was a shareholder of the Santa Juliana Mining Company, and municipal president of Ocampo. With this position, he arrived on 22 January 1883 in the town of Pinos Altos ("High Pines"), where he suffocated a strike of miners and had three workers shot in the Las Lajas neighborhood: Blas Venegas, Cruz Baca, and Ramon Mena. Two or three hours later, the political chief Ramón Campos arrived in the town and ordered the execution of two labor leaders, promoters of the strike: Juan Valenzuela and Francisco Campos.

=== Return to Sonora ===
In 1888 he sold his shares in the mining sector and returned to Sonora.

Upon learning that the Porfiriato government (the long term of General Porfirio Díaz in office) began to grant concessions for the use of the waters of various rivers, giving ownership of the demarcated land in exchange for the cost of the technical work and construction of the works for the irrigation of those lands, presented his project for the southern region of Sonora called Valle del Yaqui.

On 22 August 1890, by means of a contract signed by Conant and General Carlos Pacheco, Secretary of Development, Colonization and Industry of the regime of Porfirio Díaz, the Federal Government granted the concession to open 300 000 hectares of land (741 290 acres) for cultivation and open irrigation canals taking advantage of the waters of the Yaqui and Mayo rivers, in the State of Sonora, and the Fuerte River in the State of Sinaloa. The approval of the contract was published four months later, on 22 December 1890.

Conant undertook the first demarcations on the Yaqui River lands, with his own resources, those of his brother Benito and those of fellow shareholder Santos Valenzuela, but the magnitude of the project required more financing. He traveled to New York and formed the Sonora-Sinaloa Irrigation Company, partnering with American investors, to found a company that was integrated by Walter Logan, as president and treasurer; Carlos Conant as vice president and general manager; Salter S. Clark as secretary, and Z. O. Stocker as civil engineer. With the above, this businessman born in Guaymas became one of the first settlers of the now fertile Valle del Yaqui.

== Personal life ==
A son of the American Charles Rich Conant and the Mexican Simona Maldonado, Charles "Carlos" Conant Maldonado was born on 20 January 1842 in Guaymas, Sonora. As a teenager he had an entrepreneurial spirit. He married María Jesús Montijo, and they had six daughters and two sons.

By 1905, Conant retired to his hometown of Guaymas, where he died on 5 February 1907.

== Tribute ==
In Ciudad Obregón a street bears his name.
