= Colonia Soto =

Colonia Soto may refer to the following places in Mexico:

- Colonia Soto, Chihuahua
- Colonia Soto, Sonora
