= Huatabampo =

- City

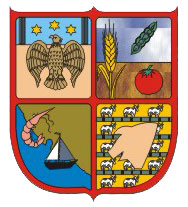
- Seal
- Nickname: Tierra de generales
- Location within Sonora Location within Mexico
- Coordinates: 27°3′N 109°25′W
- Country: Mexico
- State: Sonora
- Municipality: Huatabampo

Government
  - Municipal president: Juan Jesús Flores Mendoza; Morena

Population (2005)
  - Total: 76,296
  - Demonym: Huatabampense
- Time zone: UTC–07:00 (Zona Pacífico)
- Postal code: 85900-
- Area code: 647

Huatabampo (Spanish pronunciation: [wataˈβampo]) is a city in Huatabampo Municipality in the state of Sonora, in northwestern Mexico. It is situated on the Gulf of California, near the mouth of the Mayo River. Huatabampo is 34 km (21 mi) southwest of Navojoa via Sonora State Highway 56 and Sonora State Highway 149. Mexican Federal Highway 15 can be accessed via Sonora State Highway 176. It is notable as the home of revolutionary general Álvaro Obregón, a successful chickpea farmer before the Mexican Revolution, and now his burial site.

== Etymology ==
The name Huatabampo is from the local Mayo language: "Huata" (Willow) + "Bampo" (Water), or "Willow in/near the Water".

Huatabampo is also known as "Tierra de Generales" (Land of Generals) since during the Mexican Revolution (1910–1917) several high-ranking revolutionary generals emerged from the town. Among them is Álvaro Obregón (1880–1928), who was born in Navojoa, but lived for many years in Huatabampo, the only undefeated general in the war. He was elected President of the Mexican Republic (1920–1924) after the war, being an important link between the war-devastated country and the first stages of political, economical and social development. He was assassinated in 1928 after his election to a second term, before he could take office. He is buried in the old local cemetery.

Other generals from the area were General José Tiburcio Otero Toledo (1834–1900), a famous military and a governor of Sonora, and General Ignacio Otero Pablos (1896–1970), who was Ambassador to the Dominican Republic and Venezuela and also a candidate for governor of Sonora.

== Demographics ==
The population was 74,533 in 2005, with 29,789 inhabitants living in the municipal seat. Other towns are Ejido la Unión, Yavaros, Sahuaral de Otero, Etchoropo, Huatabampito, Moroncarit, Agiabampo, Estación Luis, Las Bocas, El Caro, Citavaro, Pozo Dulce, and El Júpare.

As of 2005 the per capita income for the municipality of Huatabampo was $5,984 and the Human Development Index was 0.8002.

== Economy ==
Huatabampo is a major agricultural producer for the area, its produce includes chickpeas as well as assorted fruit, vegetable and cereal crops. Cattle and swine raising is also very important.

Since Huatabampo has 120 km (75 mi) of coastline, fishing plays a major role in the economy. There are over 3,000 registered fishermen and around 20 open sea trawlers, in addition to almost 1,000 small boats. Shrimp raising has also become a major industry in recent years.

In 2000 there were 8 industries for industrialization of sardines, crab, and shrimp. The production of fish oil and fish flour is also important.

== Tourism ==
The city attracts a considerable number of tourists, primarily from the United States, due to its beaches and spas.

Huatabampo is home to the Museum of Álvaro Obregón at the house of the revolutionary general and President of Mexico. His tomb is in the Old Cemetery.

== Notable residents ==
- Álvaro Obregón
- General Ignacio Otero Pablos
- José Tiburcio Otero Toledo
- José Luis Ramírez
- Fernando Salas
- Baldomero "Mel" Almada
- Mario Almada
- Fernando Almada
- Daniel Duarte (baseball)
