= Valle del Yaqui =

Highly productive agricultural area in Sonora, Mexico

The Valle del Yaqui or Yaqui Valley is a highly productive agricultural area in Sonora. Durum wheat is a major crop. However, the crop is highly fertilized, and is a significant source of nitrous oxide, a powerful greenhouse gas.

The natives, the Yaquis, since the Pre-Columbian era inhabited and farmed on the west bank of the Yaqui River. Much of the valley, to the east side of the river, was a semi-desert region covered with scrub, mesquites, and cacti. It was not until the end of the 19th century that the irrigation project conceived by Carlos Conant was developed, and a vast area began to be used for agriculture.

After the Mexican Revolution, the federal government took control of Sonora's irrigation infrastructure and after World War II, began extensive dam and reservoir construction. From the 1940s to the 1970s, advanced agricultural techniques were pioneered by Norman Borlaug of the International Maize and Wheat Improvement Center (CIMMYT) based in Ciudad Obregón. This combined new varieties of wheat, with irrigation, fertilizers and pesticides to greatly increase production. Mexico went from a wheat importer in the 1940s to a wheat exporter in the 1960s.

The short-stemmed varieties of wheat that were used in the Green Revolution were developed in the Yaqui Valley. They require liberal applications of nitrogen. If too much is applied the excess escapes into the atmosphere. In underdeveloped countries, such as Mexico, regulation may not be adequate to prevent this.

Cities of 25,000 or more include Ciudad Obregon, Empalme, Guaymas, Huatabampo, and Navojoa. The Mayo Valley near Navojoa is part of the agricultural region.
