= Benito Juárez Municipality, Sonora =

Municipality in Mexico

Coordinates: 27.417°N 110.017°W

Benito Juárez
- Municipality
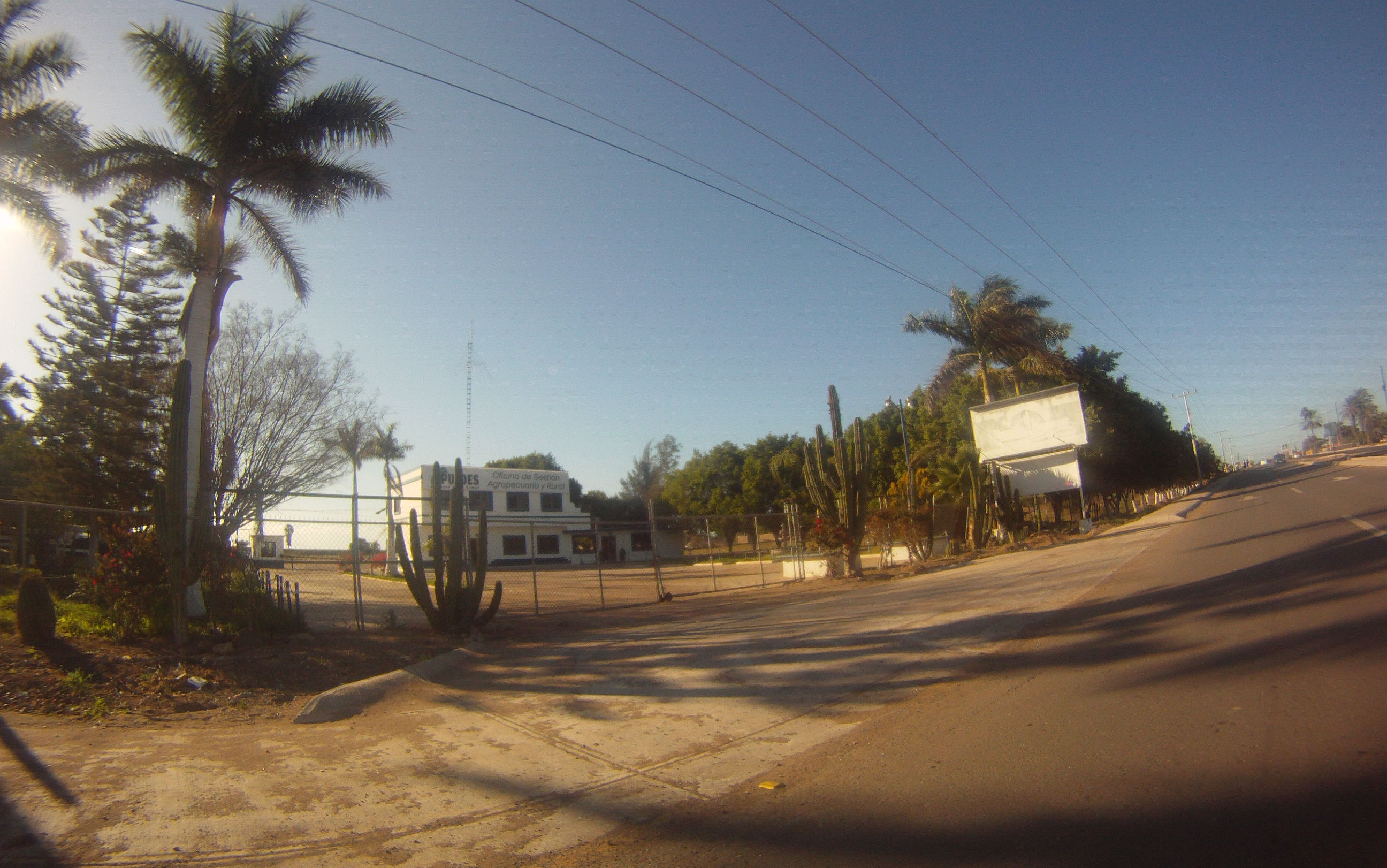

- Coat of arms

- Location in Mexico Benito Juárez (Mexico)
- Country: Mexico
- State: Sonora
- Demonym: (in Spanish)
- Time zone: UTC−7 (MST)

Benito Juárez is one of the 72 municipalities (municipios) of the Mexican state of Sonora. It borders with the municipio of Cajeme. The municipal seat is Villa Juárez. As of 2020, the population was of 21,692.

== History ==
The region was settled in the 1940s after the construction of the Angostura Dam and 151 members of the government division of irrigation were given land in the Mayo Valley in place of what would have been compensation with cash.

In 1943, the ex-employees settled in a place they later appropriately named "Colonia Irrigación" ("Irrigation Colony") and later it became dependent on the town (comisaría) Bacobampo until it itself became a town in 1947. In 1957, "Colonia Irrigación" was renamed as Villa Juárez (after president Benito Juárez). Another settlement in the region was called "Sube y Baja" ("up and down") populated by indigenous inhabitants.

In 1996, the region was incorporated into a municipality with the name of Benito Juárez. Before this time the town was part of Etchojoa Municipality.

== Government ==
The municipal presidents have been:

- Ernesto Cornejo Valenzuela (2003–2006)
- María Cristina Carvajal Pak (2000–2003)
- Ramón Marquez Vera (1997–2000)
- Luis Herrera Portillo (1994–1997)
