= Sonora State Highway 163 =

Highway in Sonora, Mexico

State Highway 163
- Carretera estatal 163

Route information
- Length: 1.4 km (0.87 mi)

Major junctions
- From: Fed. 15
- To: Navojoa Airport

Location
- Country: Mexico
- State: Sonora

Highway system
- Mexican Federal Highways; List; Autopistas; State Highways in Sonora

Sonora State Highway 163 (Carretera Estatal 163) is a highway in the south of the Mexican state of Sonora.

It runs from Navojoa Airport to the junction with Mexican Federal Highway 15. Its total length is 1.4 km.
