= Sonora State Highway 147 =

Highway in Sonora, Mexico

State Highway 147
- Carretera estatal 147

Major junctions
- From: Fed. 15 at Navojoa
- To: Bacobampo

Location
- Country: Mexico
- State: Sonora

Highway system
- Mexican Federal Highways; List; Autopistas; State Highways in Sonora

Sonora State Highway 147 (Carretera Estatal 147) is a highway in the south of the Mexican state of Sonora.

It runs from Navojoa to Bacobampo.
