= Las Bocas, Sonora =

Las Bocas
- Village
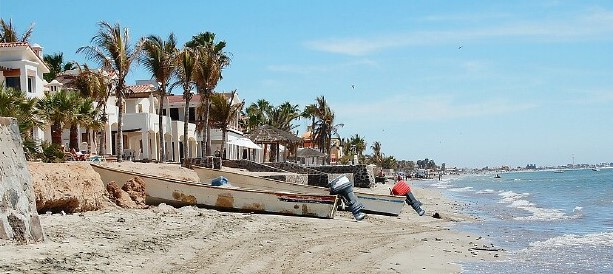
- Nickname: Las Bocas Beach
- Location of Las Bocas in Mexico Las Bocas (Sonora)
- Coordinates: 26°34′53″N 109°19′41″W
- Country: Mexico
- State: Sonora

Las Bocas is a small fishing village located in the south of the Mexican state of Sonora. It is part of the Huatabampo municipality. Despite being part of Huatabampo, most properties there are owned by families from Navojoa who have their second house next to the beach.

Las Bocas is a popular weekend and holiday destination for people from the south of Sonora (mainly the city of Navojoa) and north of Sinaloa. It is especially visited during the Holy Week which is the week before Easter.

== Beaches ==
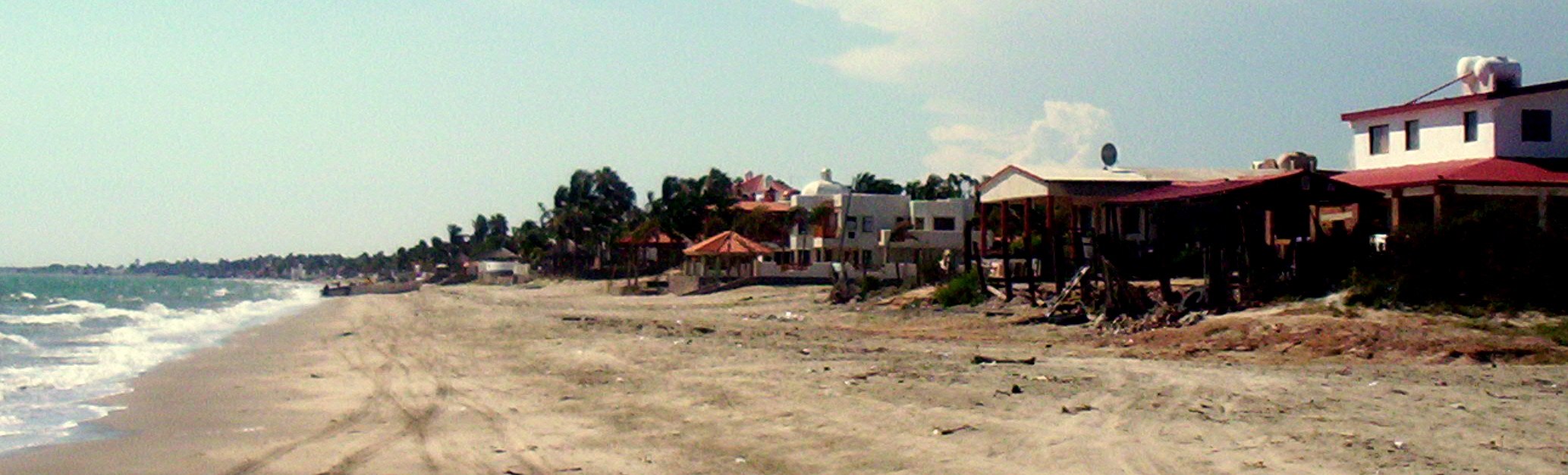
View of Playa Sur

There are two main beaches in Las Bocas: Playa Norte (North Beach) and Playa Sur (South Beach).

Other beaches around Las Bocas area include Camahuiroa to the south, and Tohahui and Bachoco to the north.

La Ballena is a small beach located near el Tohahui where little palapas are built, one of them belongs to Tachito Hernández.

== Accommodations and other services ==
There is a small hotel located near the Plaza at Playa Norte. Many houses are available for rental. There are several small grocery stores; larger supermarkets are only available in Navojoa. There are no gas stations in Las Bocas but gas is delivered and sold by local residents. During Holy Week there are several places to eat local Mexican food and sea food, but other kinds of restaurants are not available.

== Transportation ==
The town is 15 km (9 mi) from Mexican Federal Highway 15 via a two-lane, paved state road.

Playa Sur has its main boulevard paved as it is part of the Carretera Costera Riviera Mayo (Mayo Riviera Coastal Road). This highway connects to neighbor beaches Tohaui, Bajerobeta, and Bachoco, and to the port of Yavaros.

The nearest commercial airport is Ciudad Obregón International Airport, roughly 100 km (62 mi) away.
