= Sonora State Highway 56 =

State Highway 56
- Carretera estatal 56

Major junctions
- From: SH 149
- To: Huatabampo

Location
- Country: Mexico
- State: Sonora

Highway system
- Mexican Federal Highways; List; Autopistas; State Highways in Sonora

Sonora State Highway 56 (Carretera Estatal 56) is a highway in the south of the Mexican state of Sonora.

It runs from the junction with Sonora State Highway 149 and Highway to Bacobampo to Huatabampo.
