= Javier Alatorre =

Mexican journalist

- Born: Javier Alatorre Soria; January 15, 1961 (age 65); Navojoa, Sonora, Mexico
- Occupation: News anchor

Javier Alatorre Soria (born 15 January 1961) is a Mexican journalist and television news presenter. He is best known for hosting Hechos, TV Azteca's flagship evening newscast, which he has presented since 1994.

== Life and career ==
Javier Alatorre Soria was born in Navojoa, Sonora, Mexico on 15 January 1961. He initially studied law at the National Autonomous University of Mexico (UNAM) and economics at the Metropolitan Autonomous University (UAM). He became interested in journalism while young and began working as a reporter for Imevisión, the state-owned television network that preceded TV Azteca. After the privatization of Imevisión in 1993 and the creation of TV Azteca, on 21 February 1994, he began hosting Hechos, the network's evening newscast. Alatorre has also worked as a war correspondent. Alatorre also worked as a radio presenter, hosting a news program on Reporte 98.5 from 2004 to 2021.

In 1999, the Navojoa government named Alatorre a Distinguished Citizen. He won the National Journalism Award in 2010.
