= Sonora State Highway 40 =

State Highway 40
- Carretera estatal 40

Major junctions
- From: San Luis Rio Colorado
- To: Golfo de Santa Clara

Location
- Country: Mexico
- State: Sonora

Highway system
- Mexican Federal Highways; List; Autopistas; State Highways in Sonora

Sonora State Highway 40 (Carretera Estatal 40) is a highway in the north-west of the Mexican state of Sonora.

It runs from San Luis Rio Colorado to Golfo de Santa Clara.
