= Antonio Leyva Duarte =

Mexican politician

Member of the Congress of Sonora from the 20th district
- In office 16 September 2000 – 15 September 2003
- Preceded by: Olegario Carrillo Meza
- Succeeded by: José Rodrigo Gastélum Ayón

Personal details
- Citizenship: Mexican
- Party: PRI

Antonio Leyva Duarte is a Mexican politician representing the Institutional Revolutionary Party (PRI). He served in the LVI Legislature of the Congress of Sonora from 2000 to 2003.

Leyva is a native of Bacobampo, Sonora. In 2000, he won a seat representing the 20th district in the LVI Legislature of the Congress of Sonora. Leyva earned 47 percent of the vote, while his closest challenger, Party of the Democratic Revolution (PRD) candidate Guadalupe Morales Valenzuela, finished with 46 percent. He served on the committees for Municipal Budgets (Presupuestos Municipales), Municipal Public Services (Servicios Públicos Municipales), and Indigenous Affairs (Asuntos Indígenas).
