= San Luis Río Colorado Airport =

Former airport that served San Luis Rio Colorado, Sonora, Mexico

San Luis Río Colorado Airport Aeropuerto de San Luis Río Colorado
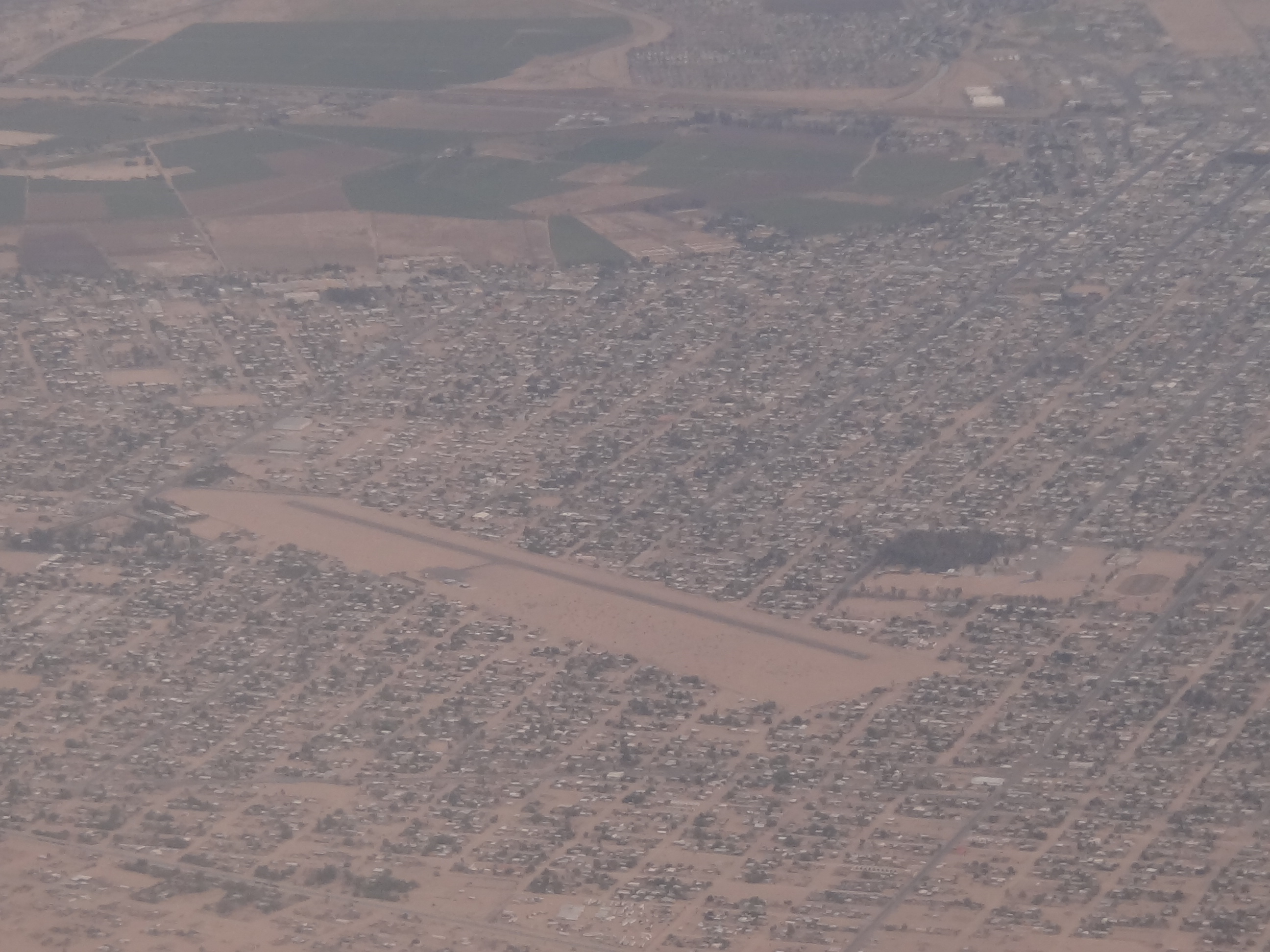
- IATA: UAC; ICAO: MM76; LID: SLR

Summary
- Airport type: Public
- Serves: San Luis Río Colorado, Sonora, Mexico
- Time zone: MST (UTC-07:00)
- Elevation AMSL: 15 m (49 ft)
- Coordinates: 32°26′43″N 114°47′52″W

Map
- Location of airport in Sonora UAC (Mexico)

Runways
Direction	Length		Surface
Direction	ft	m	Surface
~~13/31~~	~~4,935~~	~~1,504~~	~~Asphalt~~

Statistics (2020)
- Total passengers: N/A
- Source: Agencia Federal de Aviación Civil

San Luis Río Colorado Airport (Spanish: Aeropuerto de San Luis Rio Colorado) ~~(IATA: UAC, ICAO: MM76)~~ was an airport located in San Luis Río Colorado, Sonora in Mexico, near the U.S.-Mexico border. It served general aviation purposes, featuring a runway designated 13/31, with an asphalt surface measuring 1,504 by 30 metres (4,934 ft × 98 ft). Adjacent facilities included an apron, several hangars, and a small terminal building, which was demolished in the early 2020s. A small shopping mall has been constructed on the northern edge of the airport grounds. The nearest airport providing commercial flights is Mexicali International Airport, located 48 kilometres (30 mi) west of San Luis Río Colorado.

== See also ==
- List of airports in Mexico
- Transportation in Mexico
- Tourism in Mexico
- Mexical International Airport
