= Sonora State Highway 37 =

State Highway 37
- Carretera estatal 37

Major junctions
- From: Puerto Peñasco
- To: Fed. 2 at Caborca

Location
- Country: Mexico
- State: Sonora

Highway system
- Mexican Federal Highways; List; Autopistas; State Highways in Sonora

Sonora State Highway 37 (Carretera Estatal 37) is a highway in the Mexican state of Sonora.

It runs from Puerto Peñasco to the junction with Mexican Federal Highway 2 at Caborca.
