= Ignacio Mondaca Romero =

Mexican writer

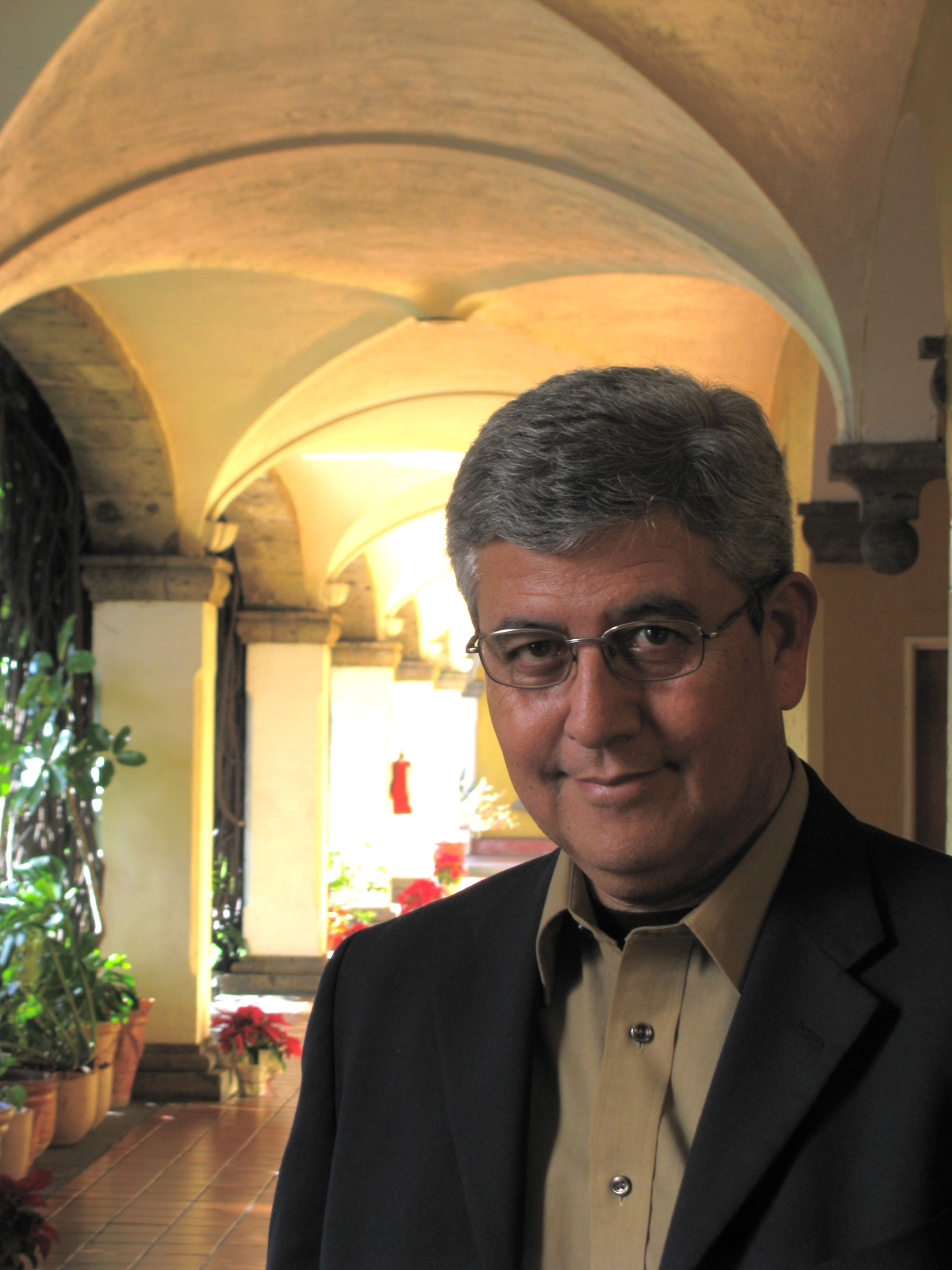
Ignacio Mondaca Romero

Ignacio Mondaca Romero (born 1956, died 2021) was a Mexican writer of articles, essays, literary criticism and books.

Romero was born in San Luis Río Colorado, Sonora, Mexico. His work has won the Concurso Nacional de Cuento in 1998, the Concurso del Libro Sonorense in 2003 and in 2009.

Romero's major works include El pianoforte, Relatos de ocio, El diluvio y otros cuentos, Cuentos para llevar, Brevedad vital, Ensayos del desaire and Crónicas de una ciudad despierta. Mondaca was the president of the Escritores de Sonora, A.C. writers organization from 2006 to 2010. He was Literature coordinator in the Instituto Sonorense de Cultura.
