= Sonora State Highway 149 =

State Highway 149
- Carretera estatal 149

Major junctions
- From: Navojoa
- To: SH 56

Location
- Country: Mexico
- State: Sonora

Highway system
- Mexican Federal Highways; List; Autopistas; State Highways in Sonora

Sonora State Highway 149 (Carretera Estatal 149) is a highway in the south of the Mexican state of Sonora.

It runs from Navojoa, where it is named Rafael J. Almada Boulevard, to the junction with Highway to Bacobampo and Sonora State Highway 56.
