= Adolfo Ruiz Cortines Dam =

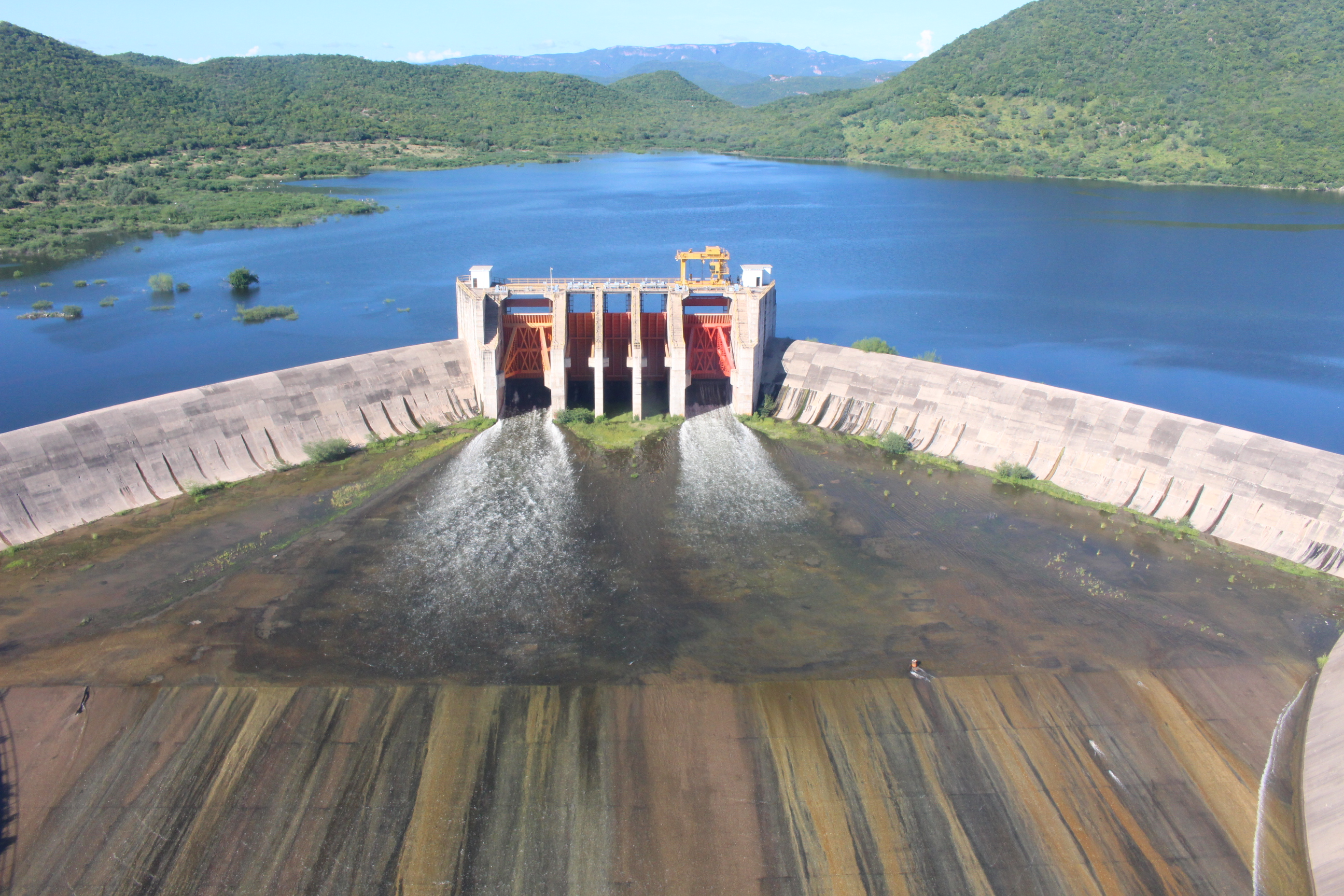
- Adolfo Ruiz Cortines Dam on Mayo River
- Official name: Adolfo Ruiz Cortines Dam
- Location: Álamos, Sonora, Mexico
- Coordinates: 27°13′0″N 109°6′0″W
- Opening date: 1955
- Operator(s): Comision Nacional del Agua

Dam and spillways
- Impounds: Mayo River (Mexico)
- Height: 81 m (266 ft)
- Length: 775 m (2,543 ft)

The Adolfo Ruiz Cortines Dam, built in 1955 is a medium-sized reservoir, located in the Mexican state of Sonora; it provides water for the Río Mayo Irrigation district. At 1,100 million m^{3} it ranks the 25th largest reservoir in Mexico. In 1985 the dam overflowed reservoir forcing the evacuation of 20,000 people.

== Description and statistics ==
The main source of water supply for the irrigation district is the watershed of the Mayo River (hence the name Rio Mayo), which covers an approximate area of 11,000 km^{2}. The river extends for approximately 350 km and averages 1,000 million m^{3} in streamflows. The hydraulic work used to secure the flows from the river is the ARC reservoir, also known as Mocuzari. The ARC reservoir was built in 1955 and its infrastructure consists of an earth- filled structure 81 m high above the river bed, 775 m long, and 10 m wide at the crest, and 440 m wide at the base. After an expansion project in 1968, the storage capacity increased from 1,100 million m^{3} to 1,300 million m^{3}. The silting that occurs through the years has reduced the capacity. Of the 51 reservoirs in Mexico, the Adolfo Ruiz Cortines ranks 25th in size. The largest system is over 10,000 million m^{3} and the smallest is around 27 million m^{3}

The mean inflows accumulation to the reservoir over one agricultural year is 1,034 million m^{3}. The mean annual agricultural releases are 832 million m^{3}. This number does not account for releases for municipal use (around 20 million m^{3}), reservoir spills and evaporation losses. semesters. The first semester corresponds to the accumulation of inflows between October and March. This accumulation is important because it determines whether agricultural production occurs in the SS season. 30% of the annual accumulations occur in this semester. The second semester corresponds to the period April–October and is the most critical to replenish the reservoir. 70% of the inflows occur in this period.

== History ==
In 1985 the dam overflowed reservoir forcing the evacuation of 20,000 people. Water then flowed towards the Pacific coast cut off the international highway and isolated several small towns. A highway was cut north of Navojoa, 240 miles from the U.S. border. Troops were deployed to help the evacuees, who left their homes after the Mocuzari Dam overflowed.

As a consequence of droughts that occurred the Adolfo Ruiz Cortinez dam on the Mayo River in Sonora had been operating erratically during 2004, which made it impossible to deliver the surface water volumes pledged to Irrigation District 038 in Río Mayo, Sonora, at the start of each agricultural cycle, and caused an overexploitation of groundwater. In order to solve this problem, the State Water Commission of Sonora asked IMTA to determine optimal policies of joint dam-aquifer operation. To do so, methodologies based on dynamic programming and genetic algorithms were used. As a result, an operation policy was recommended that considers an extraction volume from the dam dependent of the storage level at the beginning of the agricultural cycle. Specifically, a minimum extraction volume of 400 hm^{3} and a maximum extraction volume of 1,100 hm^{3} were determined. This policy allows to eliminate the deficit in the surface water volumes pledged to the irrigation district and reduce extractions from the Valle del Mayo aquifer.
