= Sonora State Highway 162 =

State Highway 162
- Carretera estatal 162

Major junctions
- From: Navojoa
- To: Álamos

Location
- Country: Mexico
- State: Sonora

Highway system
- Mexican Federal Highways; List; Autopistas; State Highways in Sonora

Sonora State Highway 162 (Carretera Estatal 162) is a highway in the south of the Mexican state of Sonora.

It runs from Navojoa, where it is named Lázaro Cárdenas Boulevard, to the town of Álamos.
