= Navojoa =

- City
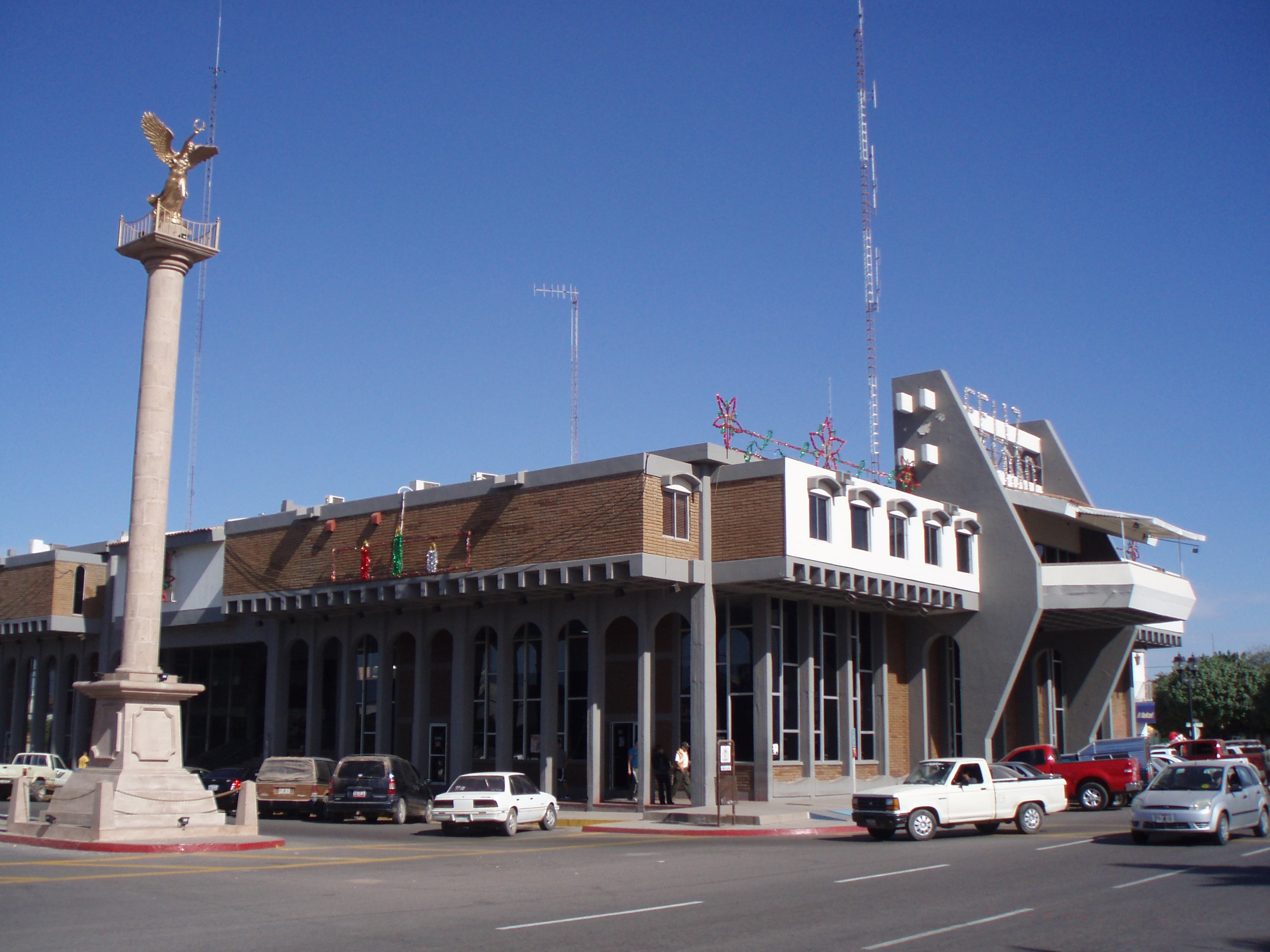
- Navojoa City Hall with a small replica of the Angel de la Independencia

- Coat of arms
- Nickname: La Perla del Mayo
- Location in Mexico Navojoa (Mexico)
- Coordinates: 27°4′52.68″N 109°26′45.96″W
- Country: Mexico
- State: Sonora
- Municipality: Navojoa Municipality
- Founded: 1907

Government
  - Municipal president: Jorge Alberto Elías Retes

Area
  - Total: 4,380.69 km^{2} (1,691.39 sq mi)
- Elevation: 50 m (160 ft)

Population (2020)
  - Total: 164,387
- Demonym: Navojoense
- Time zone: UTC–07:00 (Zona Pacífico)
- Postal code: 85800
- Area code: +52 642

Navojoa is the fifth-largest city in the northern Mexican state of Sonora and is situated in the southern part of the state. The city is the administrative seat of Navojoa Municipality, located in the Mayo River Valley.

== History ==
The city name derives from the native Mayo language meaning "cactus-house" (Navo"= Cactus, "Jova"= House). The valley has been continuously inhabited since pre-Hispanic times by the Mayo people.

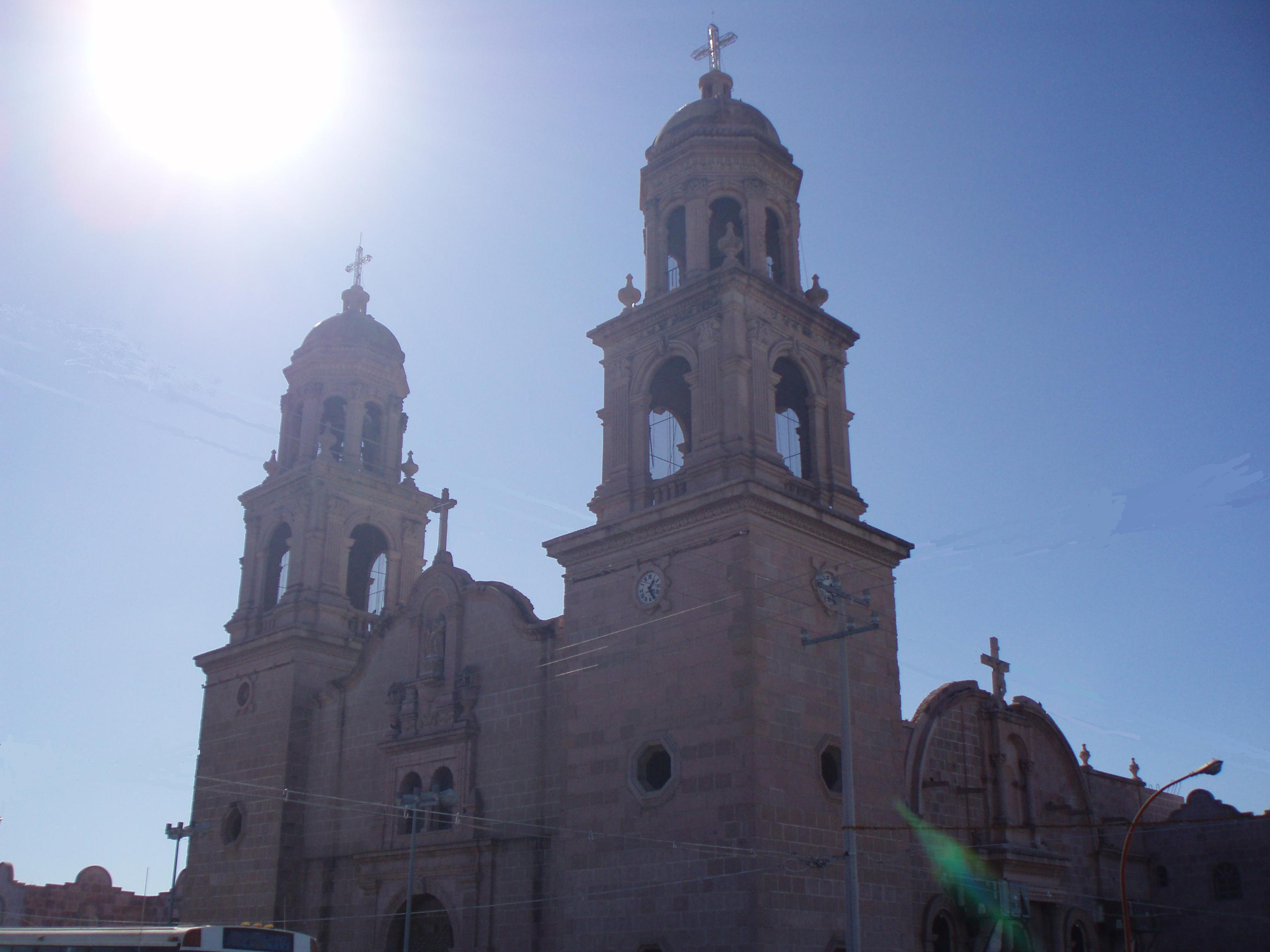
Iglesia del Sagrado Corazon

In September 1536, Diego de Guzmán, a Spaniard, became the first known European to reach the valley. The first Jesuit missionaries started settling in the region in 1614, founding Mission Santa Catalina Camoa. Several geoglyphs from the Mayo tribe can be found along the Mayo River.

Due to the city's distant location from Mexico City, the difficult times of Mexico's independence in the early 19th century were largely absent from the region. However, the city had some importance after the Mexican Revolution of 1910. The Mexican Revolutionary Álvaro Obregón was born in Hacienda Siquisiva, a small town near Navojoa. Álvaro Obregón became president of Mexico after the revolt and initiated an in the Mayo/Yaqui Valley, introducing modern agricultural techniques and making this valley one of the most prosperous agricultural regions in Mexico.

== Economy ==
Navojoa is part of the large economic center known as the Mayo Valley, which together with Ciudad Obregón and the Yaqui Valley, form one of the most productive agricultural regions in Mexico.

Although agriculture remains the main source of income, the Navojoa region is increasingly dependent on industrial foreign investment and aquaculture, especially shrimp farming.

Two large swine production companies that export mainly to the United States, Germany and Japan, a recycled containerboard mill and box factory privately owned by Sonoran investors, as well as one brewery belonging to the FEMSA group (recently acquired from Heineken), are among the main industries in Navojoa.

The city gains importance through its geographic diversity featuring close access to coastal, desert, and southwest mountainous areas as well as its close proximity to the United States and the neighboring state of Sinaloa. Navojoa is 64 kilometers (40 mi) south of Ciudad Obregón connected primarily by a toll highway (Mex. 15) that extends north across the state of Sonora to the Arizona border.

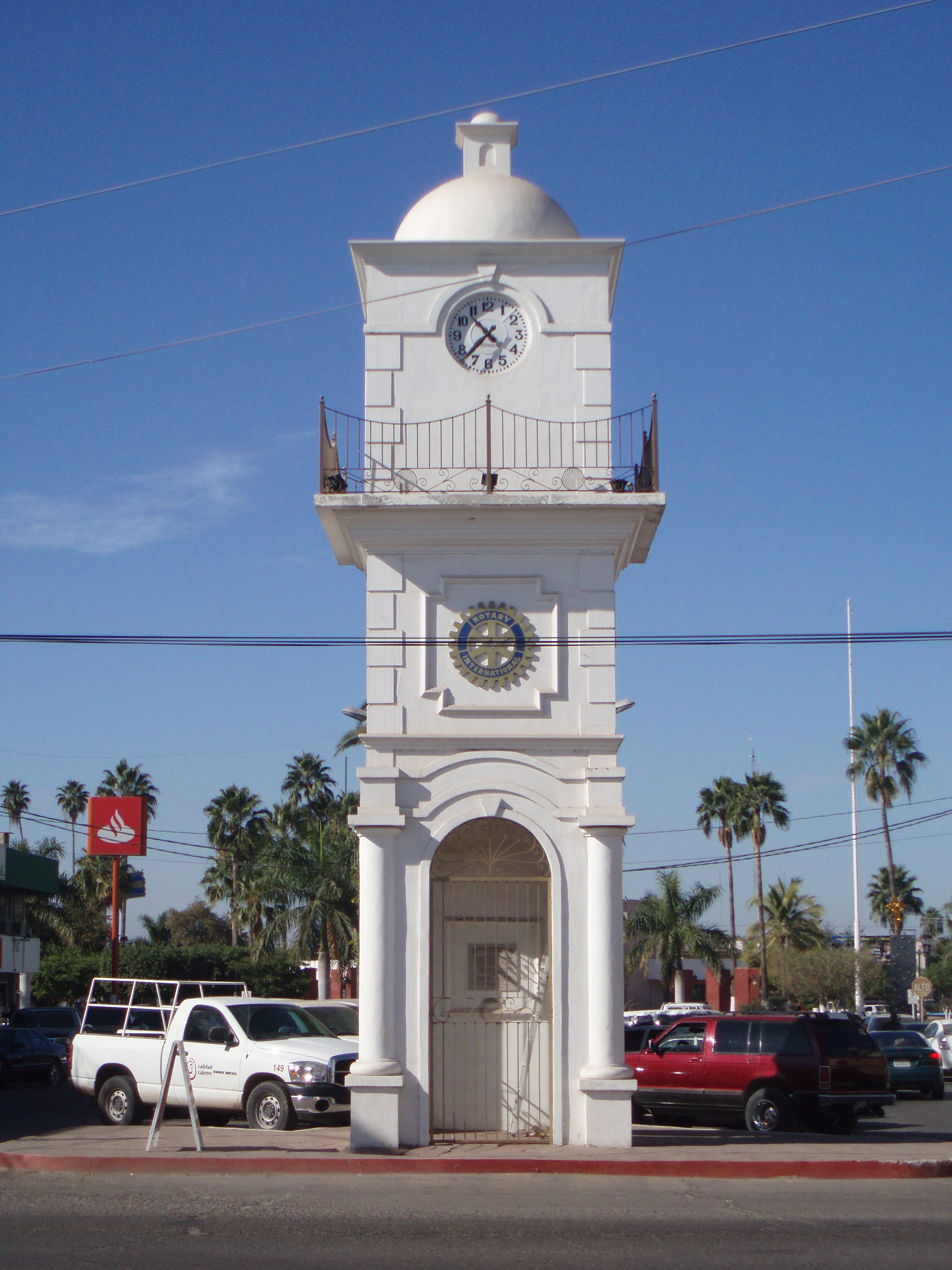
Clock Tower

== Transportation ==
=== Airports ===
Ciudad Obregón International Airport (CEN) is the nearest commercial airport, 48 kilometers (30 mi) north of Navojoa. It receives flights from Guadalajara, Hermosillo, La Paz, Loreto, Los Cabos, Mexico City, Monterrey, and, internationally, from Los Angeles, Tucson, Phoenix and Houston in the United States. Airlines serving this airport include Aeromexico, AeroCalafia, Interjet, Volaris and low-cost airline VivaAerobus.

Alternate airports to CEN are Hermosillo Intl. Airport (IATA: HMO) and in a lower sense Los Mochis (IATA: LMM). HMO also receives low cost airlines' flights incoming from the main cities of the Republic such as: Mexico City, Guadalajara, Querétaro, Monterrey, Tijuana, Puebla among others.

Navojoa also has a local airport (see: Navojoa Airport) next to the industrial sector, which is suitable for light private planes. It is about 8 kilometers (5.0 mi) south of the city center.

=== Buses ===
Several companies offer low, mid and luxury class bus services from Navojoa to the Mexican Republic and international destinations such as Tucson, Phoenix and Los Angeles in the US. Connections are offered by foreign partner companies to other USA and Canada destinations. A bus station was built in the north of the city; however it is not used and small stations in the city center are used instead.

Old public city buses have been replaced with new models with air conditioning, called SUBA. They run every few minutes and provide simple transport.

=== Railroad ===
A north-south freight-only railroad is in operation, connecting to the Mexican border in Nogales and to Guadalajara, Jalisco.

=== Highways ===
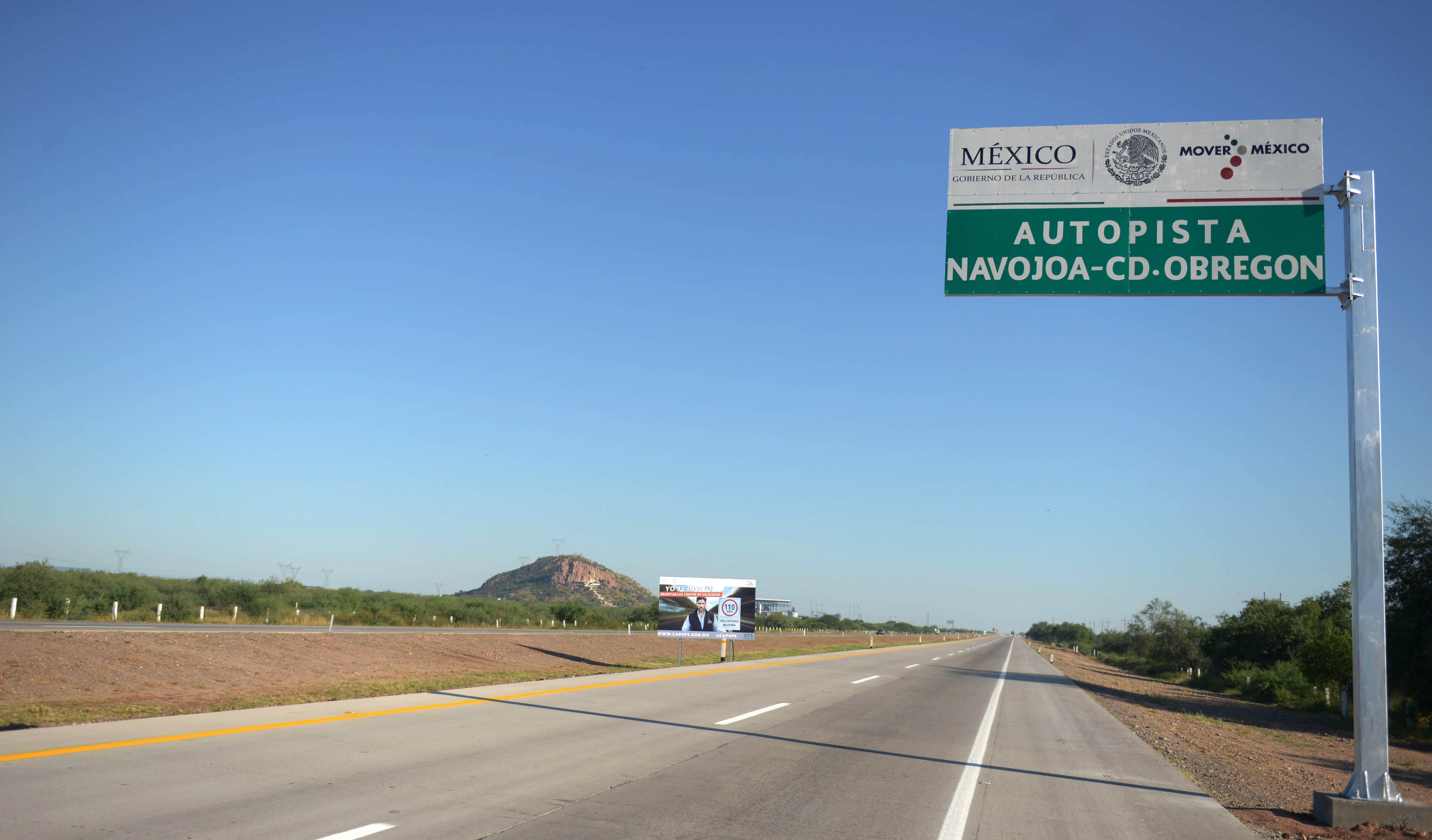
Navojoa–Ciudad Obregón Highway

The most important highway serving Navojoa is Mexican Federal Highway 15, a four-lane highway which connects it to north to Ciudad Obregón, Guaymas, Hermosillo, Nogales and the United States of America; and to the south to the states of Sinaloa, Nayarit, Jalisco, Michoacán, State of Mexico and Mexico City.

The main state routes serving Navojoa are Sonora State Highway 149 and Sonora State Highway 162.

Also, the Periférico is a semi-beltway encompassing some of Navojoa's southern and western neighborhoods and it is used as a truck route or bypass for Mexican Federal Highway 15. It is enlarged from 2 to 4 lanes in the western section between Centenario Boulevard and Sosa Chávez Boulevard with the project ending in december of 2017.

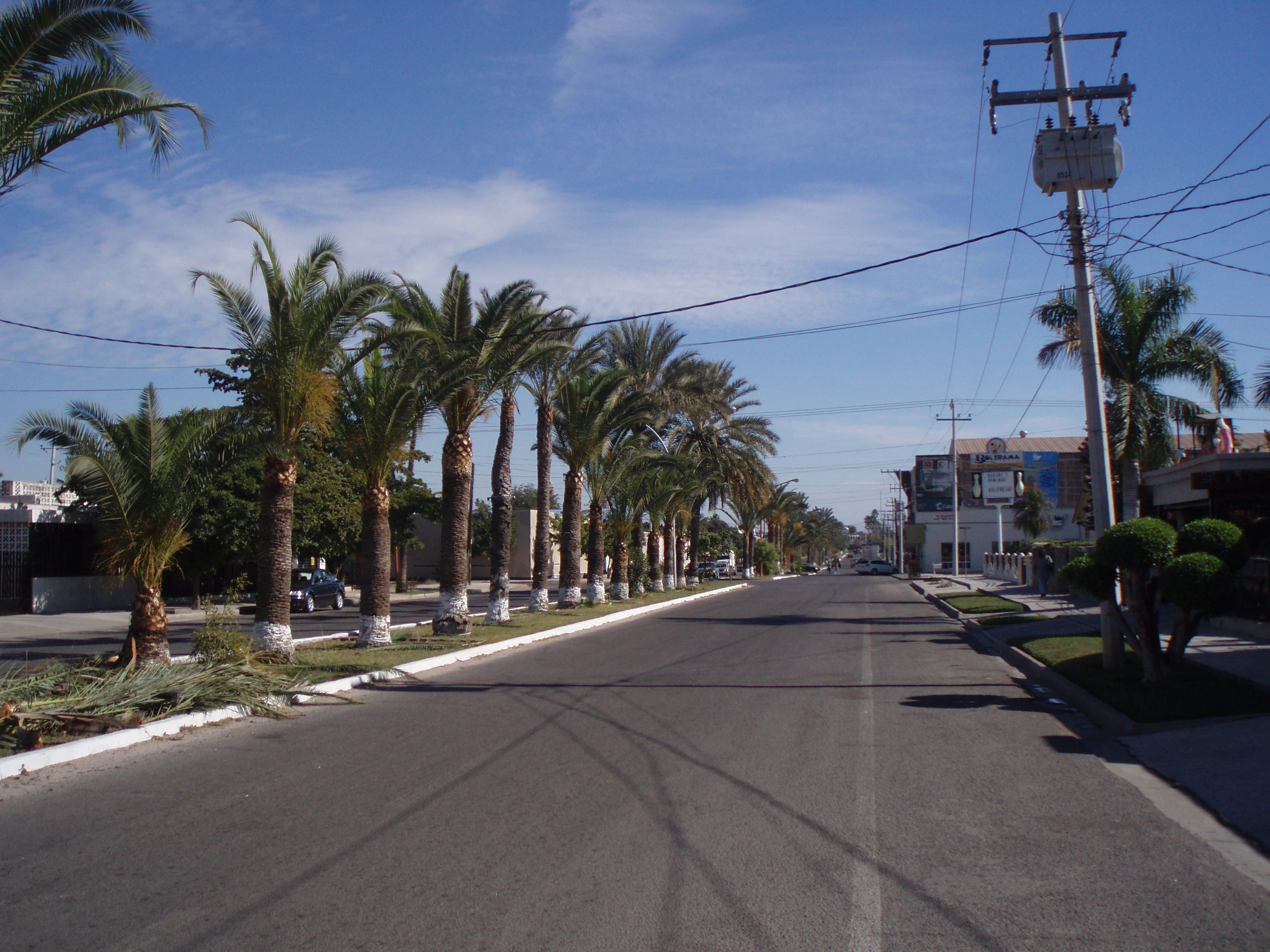
Álvaro Obregón Blvd.

=== Others ===
Although Navojoa's streets are almost all paved, horse-drawn carts are still used by the residents of the small surrounding communities (San Ignacio Cohuirimpo, etc.). Horse carts are numerous enough that there is a parking lot reserved for them on Hidalgo Avenue near the City Market in central Navojoa.

== Education ==
The following institutions of higher education are based in Navojoa:

- Instituto Tecnológico de Sonora (ITSON)
- Universidad de Sonora - Unidad Navojoa
- Universidad Pedagógica Nacional Campus Navojoa (UPN)
- Universidad de Navojoa - Affiliated with the Seventh-day Adventist Church; also known as Colegio del Pacifico
- Universidad Estatal de Sonora (UES)
- Instituto Pedagógigo de Postgrado de Sonora (IPPSON)
- Instituto Tecnológico y de Estudios Superiores de Monterrey (ITESM) - Campus Obregón/Unidad Navojoa
- Atelier Sonorense
- Universidad TecMilenio Campus Navojoa.
- Universidad del Desarrollo Profesional (UNIDEP) Campus Navojoa.

== Tourism ==
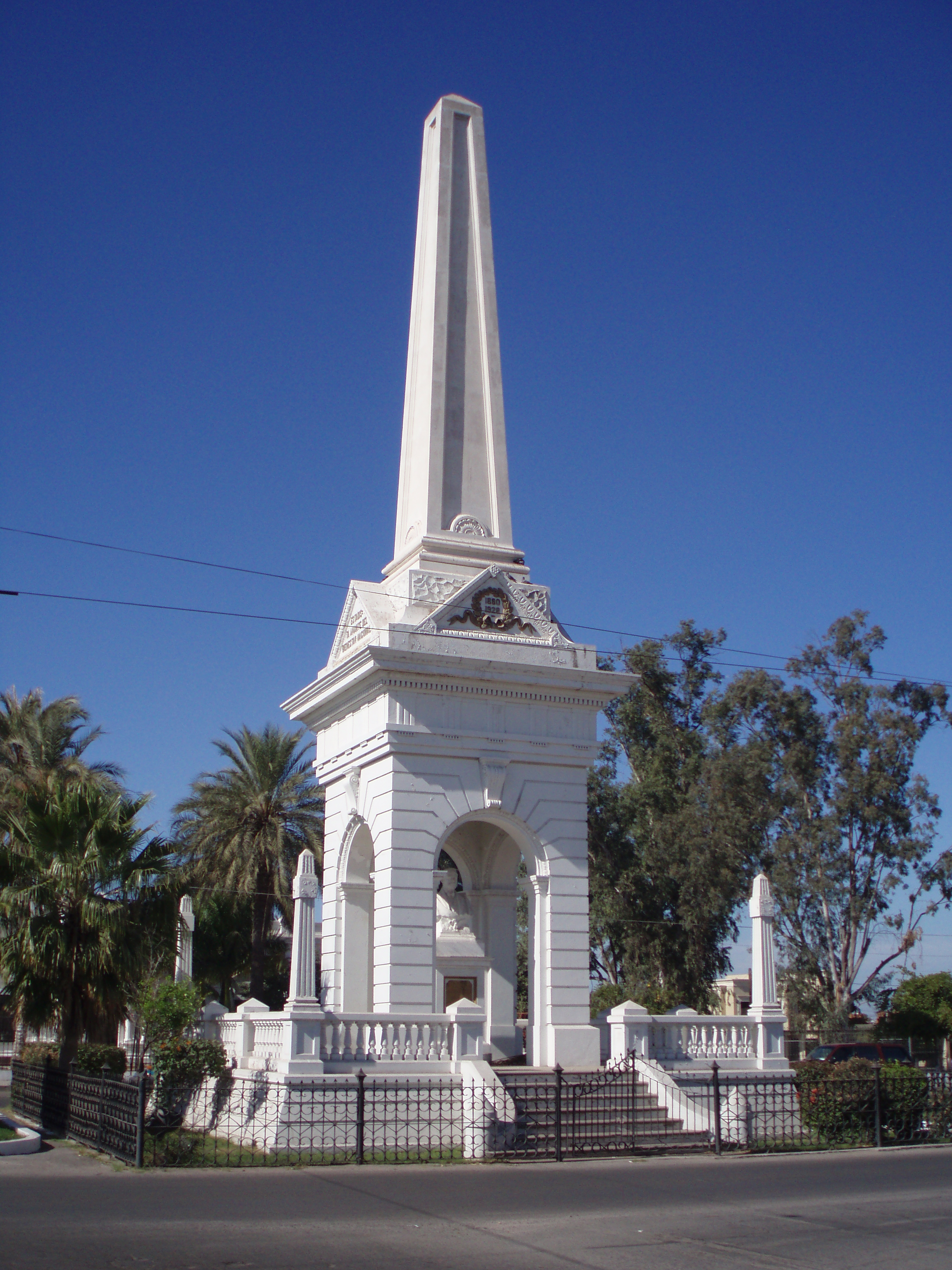
Álvaro Obregón Monument

Navojoa has many hotels with a range of cost and quality. Most hotels are located off Pesqueira Street, mainly between the 1-km-long area between Tecnológico Avenue and Centenario Boulevard.

=== Museums ===
The "Museo Regional del Mayo" (Mayo's Regional Museum) is located in the former railroad station building opposite Santa Fe Springs square. The Museum has 5 rooms which exhibit temporary paint, handicraft and sculpture expositions, pre-Hispanic and colonial objects, ethnographic expositions dedicated to the Mayos' culture and other objects related to Navojoa's history.

The Tehuelibampo Museum is an eco-museum with 89 petroglyphics carved in the stones over 500 years ago by the Mayo people. It is located next to the Mayo river, some kilometers north-west of Navojoa.

=== Beaches ===
The city is near the Gulf of California which offers a variety of beaches. The surrounding country is also popular for hunting ducks, doves and deer.

Las Bocas, 30 miles south of Navojoa, is a small beach community on the Gulf of California that is frequently visited by the local residents of Navojoa during spring. (April–May). It is particularly popular during "Semana Santa" (Holy Week), when campers stay for seven days and then return to Navojoa for Easter celebrations.

Many people from Navojoa own a second house in Las Bocas.

Although one of the closer beaches to Navojoa is located about one hour away in a small town called Huatabampo. The beach is named after the town, hence the name, "Huatabampito" where many families gather year long to enjoy the beauty of the ocean.

=== Adolfo Ruiz Cortinez dam ===
The Adolfo Ruiz Cortines Dam, also called Mocúzarit, is a popular fishing spot and stores water used for irrigating the valley via the Mayo River. Other uses include kayaking, water-skiing, geoglyph-viewing and other leisure activities.

=== Others ===
Navojoa also acts as a hub for those visiting the colonial town of Álamos, which is 48 kilometers (30 mi) inland toward the mountains of the Sierra Madre.

== Climate ==
Navojoa has a borderline semi-arid climate/desert climate (Köppen climate classification BSh/BWh) with warm winters and hot summers. Precipitation is scarce, but is more common during the summer months during the monsoon season.

Climate data for Navojoa, Sonora (1981-2010, extremes (1960–present)
Month	Jan	Feb	Mar	Apr	May	Jun	Jul	Aug	Sep	Oct	Nov	Dec	Year
Record high °C (°F)	36.5 (97.7)	39.5 (103.1)	40.5 (104.9)	43.5 (110.3)	44.0 (111.2)	48.0 (118.4)	45.5 (113.9)	45.5 (113.9)	45.0 (113.0)	43.0 (109.4)	41.5 (106.7)	38.5 (101.3)	48.0 (118.4)
Mean daily maximum °C (°F)	25.9 (78.6)	27.2 (81.0)	29.3 (84.7)	32.8 (91.0)	36.2 (97.2)	38.3 (100.9)	37.7 (99.9)	37.2 (99.0)	36.5 (97.7)	34.6 (94.3)	30.4 (86.7)	26.2 (79.2)	32.7 (90.9)
Daily mean °C (°F)	17.6 (63.7)	18.5 (65.3)	20.4 (68.7)	23.4 (74.1)	26.8 (80.2)	30.4 (86.7)	31.0 (87.8)	30.6 (87.1)	29.8 (85.6)	27.0 (80.6)	22.1 (71.8)	18.0 (64.4)	24.6 (76.3)
Mean daily minimum °C (°F)	9.3 (48.7)	9.8 (49.6)	11.4 (52.5)	14.1 (57.4)	17.4 (63.3)	22.5 (72.5)	24.4 (75.9)	24.0 (75.2)	23.1 (73.6)	19.4 (66.9)	13.8 (56.8)	9.7 (49.5)	16.6 (61.9)
Record low °C (°F)	−3.5 (25.7)	−1.0 (30.2)	1.0 (33.8)	6.2 (43.2)	9.0 (48.2)	12.5 (54.5)	16.0 (60.8)	16.0 (60.8)	14.0 (57.2)	9.0 (48.2)	3.5 (38.3)	0.5 (32.9)	−3.5 (25.7)
Average precipitation mm (inches)	22.3 (0.88)	14.9 (0.59)	4.5 (0.18)	2.3 (0.09)	0.2 (0.01)	9.8 (0.39)	98.8 (3.89)	93.8 (3.69)	122.3 (4.81)	22.7 (0.89)	18.1 (0.71)	25.4 (1.00)	435.1 (17.13)
Average precipitation days (≥ 0.1 mm)	2.4	1.8	0.8	0.6	0.1	1.2	9.2	8.9	5.7	2.0	1.8	2.0	36.5
Source: Servicio Meteorológico Nacional

== Sister cities ==
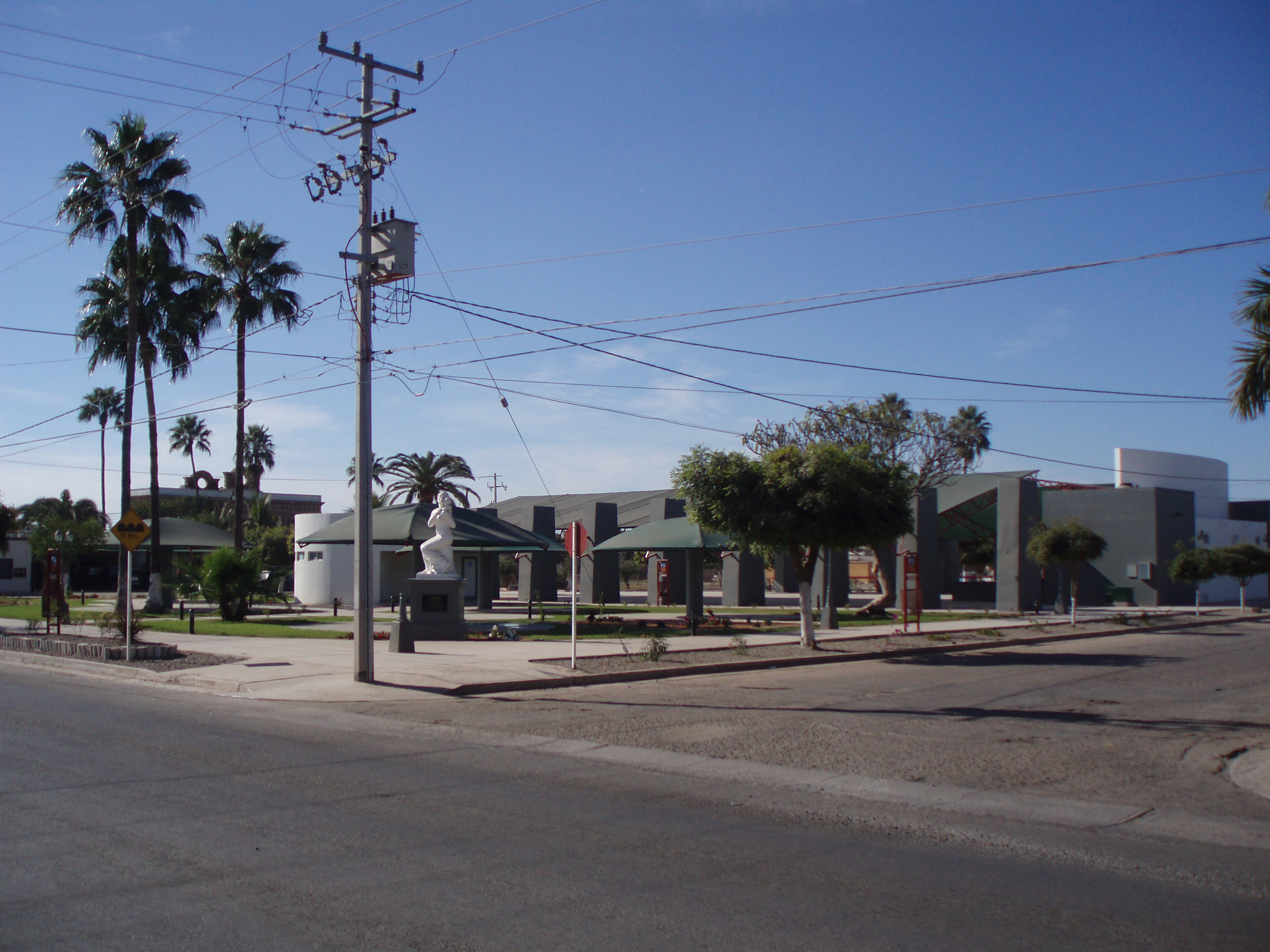
Santa Fe Springs Sq.

- Santa Fe Springs, California, United States
- Almería, Almería, Spain.
- (Mexico) Mexicali, Baja California

== Sports ==
There are two main public sports facilities in Navojoa.

One is "Unidad Deportiva Faustino Félix Serna" with many different baseball, baseball and softball fields, basketball courts, a pool, a professional baseball stadium, a professional basketball arena and many other sport facilities.

The other main sports center, "Unidad Deportiva Oriente" is located in the eastern part of the city.

Private sports centers are available too, one of them is the "Casino Social de Navojoa", located near downtown. Another one is "La Quinta Racquet Club" located in Los Naranjos neighborhood.

The city of Navojoa had its own baseball team called Mayos de Navojoa which was a member of the Liga Mexicana del Pacífico, the most important baseball league in México.

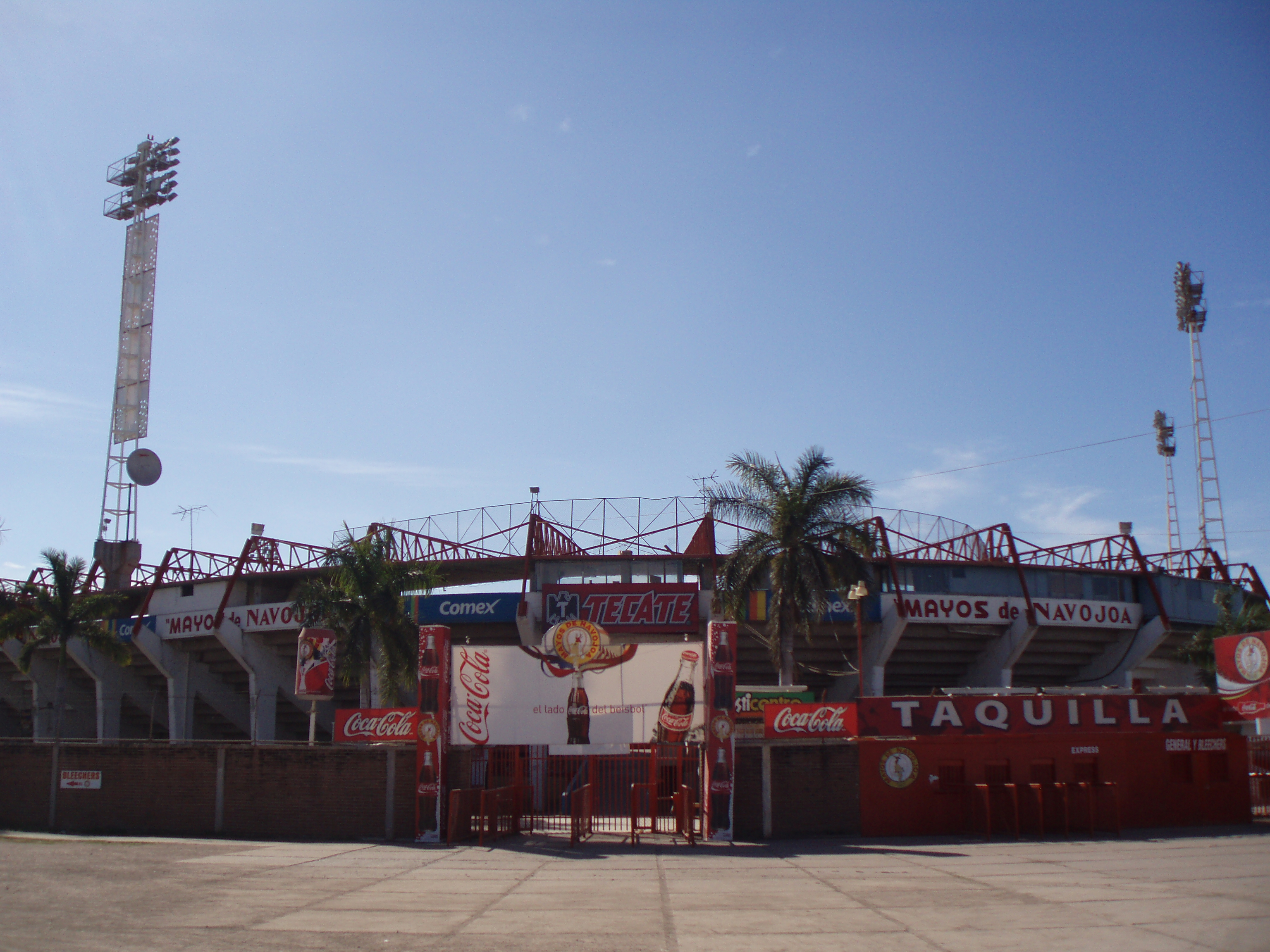
Estadio Manuel "Ciclón" Echeverría

Well-known native baseball players, all of them played in MLB:

- Gabriel "Gabe" Alvarez, Detroit Tigers.
- Luis Alfonso "Cochito" Cruz, LA Dodgers.
- Francisco "Paquín" Estrada, New York Mets.
- Isidro Márquez, Chicago White Sox.
- Fernando Valenzuela, LA Dodgers.

== Other famous natives ==
- Valentín Elizalde, Banda singer
- Ignacio Almada, writer
- Javier Alatorre, journalist and anchor for Hechos, a news show for TV Azteca
- Álvaro Obregón, President of Mexico from 1920 to 1924
- Luis Ramón "Yori Boy" Campas, boxer, former IBF World Jr. Middleweight champion
- Beatriz Adriana, folk music singer
- Manuel Echeverría, baseball player
- Arturo Chacón Cruz, tenor
- Rafael Moreno, Catholic singer
- Rodolfo Coronel, popular folk music singer
- Juan Manuel González Flores, vice-president of the International University Sports Federation
- Ana Patricia Gámez, winner of Nuestra Belleza Latina 2010
- Maria Mazon, Celebrity chef
