= Colonia Soto, Sonora =

Colonia Soto
- Location in Mexico
- Coordinates: 26°54′21″N 109°36′4″W
- Country: Mexico
- State: Sonora
- Municipality: Etchojoa
- Elevation: 12 m (39 ft)

Population (2010)
  - Total: 429
- Time zone: UTC-7 (Mountain Standard Time)
  - Summer (DST): UTC-7 (No DST)

Colonia Soto is a rural community located in Etchojoa Municipality, Sonora, Mexico. It had a population of 429 inhabitants at the 2010 census, and is situated at an elevation of 12 meters above sea level.
