= List of highways in Sonora =

The following is a list of highways in Sonora.

== Federal Highways ==
- Mexican Federal Highway 2
- Mexican Federal Highway 8
- Mexican Federal Highway 14
- Mexican Federal Highway 15
- Mexican Federal Highway 15D
- Mexican Federal Highway 16
- Mexican Federal Highway 17

== State Highways ==
- Carretera Costera Riviera Mayo
- Sonora State Highway 37
- Sonora State Highway 40
- Sonora State Highway 56
- Sonora State Highway 100
- Sonora State Highway 147
- Sonora State Highway 149
- Sonora State Highway 155
- Sonora State Highway 162
- Sonora State Highway 163
- Sonora State Highway 176
