= Navojoa Airport =

Airfield in Navojoa, Sonora, Mexico

Navojoa National Airport Aeropuerto Nacional de Navojoa
- IATA: none; ICAO: MMNV; LID: NVJ

Summary
- Airport type: Public
- Serves: Navojoa, Sonora, Mexico
- Time zone: MST (UTC−07:00)
- Elevation AMSL: 44 m / 144 ft
- Coordinates: 26°59′25″N 109°24′58″W

Map
- Location of the airport in Sonora NVJ (Mexico)

Runways
Direction	Length		Surface
Direction	m	ft	Surface
03/21	1,700	5,577	Asphalt

Statistics (2023)
- Total Passengers: N/A
- Source: Agencia Federal de Aviación Civil

Navojoa National Airport (Spanish: Aeropuerto Nacional de Navojoa) (ICAO: MMNV, FAA LID: NVJ) is an airfield located in Navojoa Municipality, Sonora, Mexico. It is 8 kilometres (5.0 mi) south of Navojoa where it serves domestic air traffic and general aviation activities. It does not provide scheduled passenger public flights. The nearest airport that serves commercial flights is Ciudad Obregon International Airport.

Situated at an elevation of 44 metres (144 ft) above mean sea level, the airport features a single asphalt runway, designated as 03/21, measuring 1,700 by 23 metres (5,577 by 75 ft). Adjacent facilities include several hangars and an apron with parking positions for small aircraft.

== See also ==
- List of the busiest airports in Mexico
- List of airports in Mexico
- List of airports by ICAO code: M
- List of busiest airports in North America
- List of the busiest airports in Latin America
- Transportation in Mexico
- Tourism in Mexico
- Ciudad Obregón International Airport
