= Bacobampo =

- Town
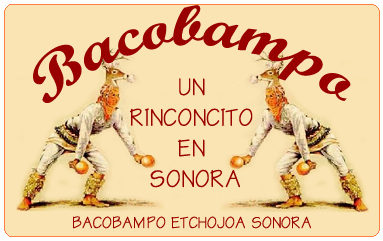
- Monografía de Bacobampo, Etchojoa Sonora

- Location within Mexico
- Coordinates: 26°59′20″N 109°39′00″W
- Country: Mexico
- State: Sonora
- Municipality: Etchojoa

Population (2010)
  - Total: 8,539
- Time zone: UTC-7 (Pacific MST)
- Postal code: 85287
- Area code: 647

Bacobampo is a town in Etchojoa Municipality in Sonora, in northwestern Mexico. It is situated on the west bank of the Mayo River, 20 km north of Huatabampo and 25 km southwest of Navajoa. It is an agricultural town surrounded by fields. Bacobampo is 22 meters above sea level.

According to the 2010 INEGI census, the town's population was 8,539 inhabitants, making it the second most populated settlement in the municipality.

== History ==
The Mayo people have continuously inhabited the valley since pre-Hispanic times. The name Bacobampo comes from the local Mayo language, meaning "Baco" (Snake) + "Bampo" (Water), or "Snake in/near the Water." The settlement's original was Cumbrocoa or Cumbrocobe, but it was changed to its current name in 1895 – when the Mayo River dried up, the natives noticed snakes in the puddles left behind.

In 1903, the Salido brothers arrived from Álamos and began working the land. Two years later, the settlement classification of Bacobampo was upgraded from ranchería to delegación. In 1920, the brothers decided to split up their land: Ildefonso and Epifanio got their part in Bacobampo while José María went to Basconcobe. They found success cultivating wheat, maize, beans, and chickpeas. Bacobampo was then established as a comisaría on 1 January 1929.

In the 1930s, the federal government invested in the northern border states, building several dams to develop the region's agriculture. The subsequent agricultural boom caused a population surge in Sonoran towns near these dams, such as Bacobampo and Colonia Irrigación (which would become Villa Juárez). In 1938, the hacienda of Bacobampo was redistributed to 802 peasants as a part of President Lázaro Cárdenas's land reform policies, and a collective ejido system was set up. Although the cooperative arrangement seemed to work well at first, the group was divided into "collectivists," who were in favor of continuing to share the profits, and "individualists," who preferred to break away from the group. Violence broke out, and the problem got so serious that Cárdenas visited the town in June 1939 to restore the peace.

== Education ==
There are two middle schools, Lázaro Cárdenas del Río and Gregorio Ahumada, and one high school, CECYTES.

== Notable people ==
- Antonio Leyva Duarte, politician and member of the LVI Legislature of the Congress of Sonora
- Juan Manuel Verdugo Rosas, politician and member of the LX Legislature of the Chamber of Deputies
- Christian Zazueta, baseball player and national team member
