= Colonia Soto, Chihuahua =

Rural community in Chihuahua, Mexico

Coordinates: 28°17′58″N 106°8′2″W

Colonia Soto is a rural community located in Chihuahua Municipality, Chihuahua, Mexico. It had a population of 177 inhabitants at the 2010 census, and is situated at an elevation of 1,681 meters above sea level.
