= Sonora State Highway 176 =

State Highway 176
- Carretera estatal 176

Major junctions
- From: Fed. 15
- To: Huatabampo

Location
- Country: Mexico
- State: Sonora

Highway system
- Mexican Federal Highways; List; Autopistas; State Highways in Sonora

Sonora State Highway 176 (Carretera Estatal 176) is a highway in the south of the Mexican state of Sonora.

It runs from Huatabampo to the junction with Mexican Federal Highway 15.
