= San Luis Río Colorado =

City in Sonora, Mexico

- City
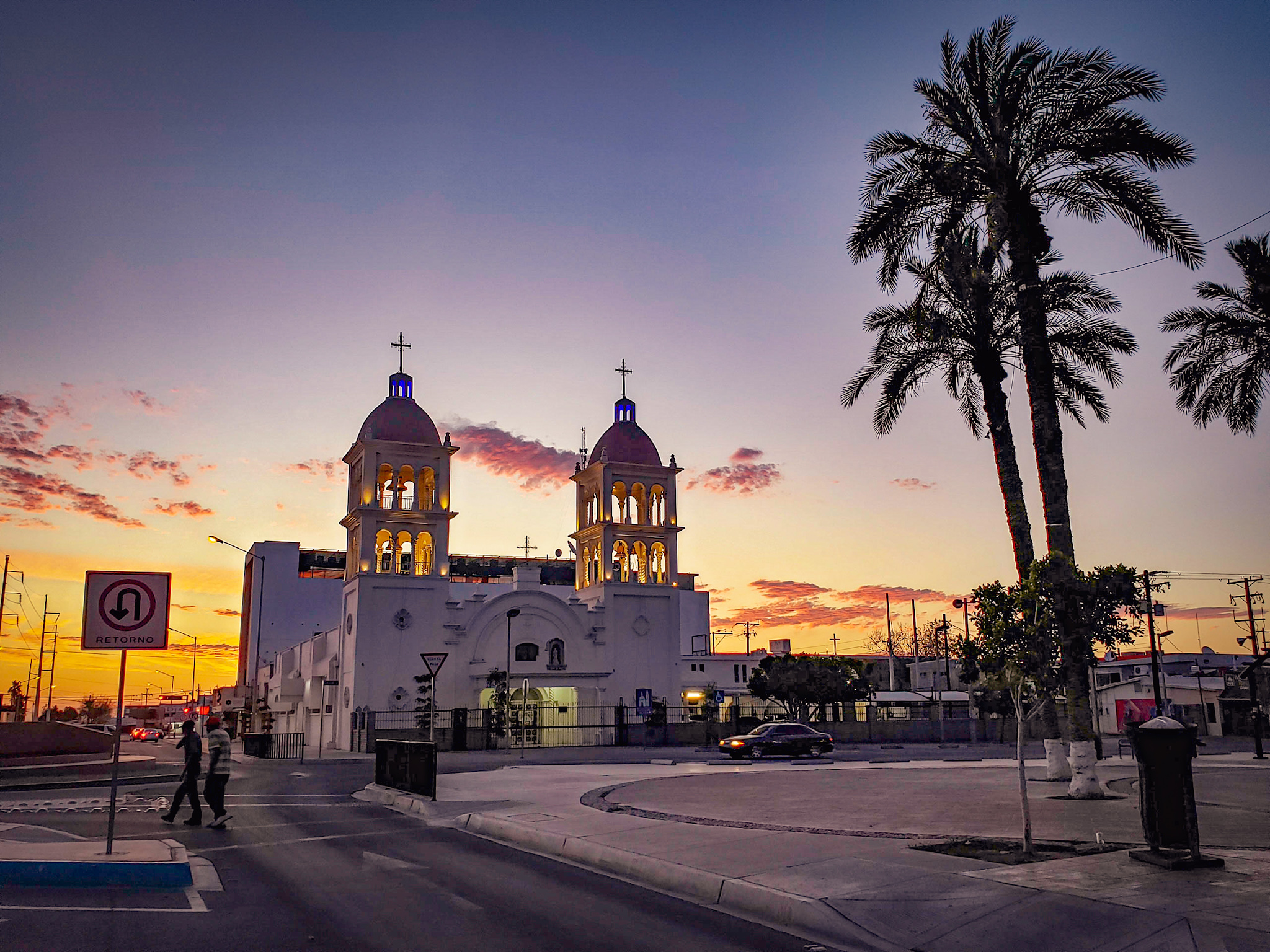
- Church of the Immaculate Concepcion, SLRC

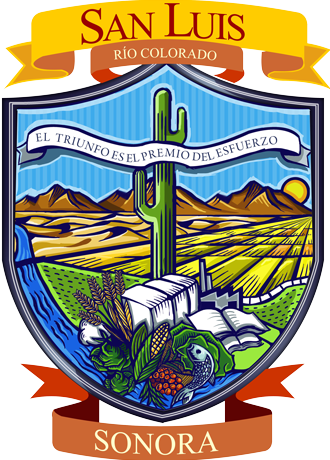
- Seal

- Location within Sonora Location within Mexico
- Coordinates: 32°28′36″N 114°45′45″W
- Country: Mexico
- State: Sonora
- Municipality: San Luis Río Colorado
- Foundation: 1907

Government
  - Type: Ayuntamiento
  - Mayor: César Iván Sandoval Gámez
- Elevation: 51 m (167 ft)

Population (2020)
  - Total: 176,685
  - Demonym: San Luisino
- Time zone: UTC–07:00 (Zona Pacífico)
- Postal code: 83400
- Area code: +52 653
- Website: Official website

San Luis Río Colorado is a city and also the name of its surrounding municipality in the state of Sonora, Mexico. In the 2020 census, the city had a population of 176,685. The city is the fourth-largest community in the state, and the municipality is also the fourth-largest in terms of population. Lying in the northwestern corner of Sonora, the city marks the state border with Baja California. It also stands on the international border with the United States, adjacent to San Luis, Arizona. It is located about 75 km from Mexicali. The municipality covers an area of 8,412.75 km^{2} (3,248.2 sq mi) in the Sonoran Desert.

== History ==
Before Spanish colonization, the area now known as San Luis Río Colorado was inhabited by the indigenous people of Halywamai who lived in the San Luis Río Colorado region until the mid-19th century, merging with the Maricopa tribe.

San Luis Río Colorado was once an important inland port for steamers traveling the Colorado from the Gulf of California. Since the early 1900s the Colorado has been completely or nearly completely drained for irrigation. The once-formidable Colorado is usually dry or a small stream.

Awarded city status in July 1958, San Luis Río Colorado serves as the administrative center for the surrounding municipality of the same name. The city is located on a mesa, characterized by a flat and sandy terrain.

On Easter Sunday 2010, a 7.2 magnitude earthquake struck the region. The Sears department store (formerly Dorian's) and 5 schools were destroyed, affecting approximately 30,000 people in the region.

San Luis Río Colorado is home to four regional medium-wave radio broadcast stations, among them 1350 XELBL-AM, all of which are popular long-distance reception targets for medium-wave DX radio enthusiasts.

Josse, a Mexican Latin beat singer, recorded a song called "San Luis Río Colorado" as a tribute to the river.

== Geography ==
=== Climate ===
San Luis Río Colorado has a desert climate (Köppen climate classification BWh), with extremely hot summers and mild winters; it is one of the hottest and driest cities in Mexico. The record high temperature is 52.5 °C (126.5 °F), recorded on 15 June 1966. The record low temperature is −6.5 °C (20.3 °F), recorded on 2 January 1950.

Climate data for San Luis Río Colorado, Sonora (1951–2010, extremes (1950–2010)
Month	Jan	Feb	Mar	Apr	May	Jun	Jul	Aug	Sep	Oct	Nov	Dec	Year
Record high °C (°F)	38.0 (100.4)	35.0 (95.0)	39.0 (102.2)	42.0 (107.6)	48.0 (118.4)	52.5 (126.5)	51.0 (123.8)	49.5 (121.1)	48.5 (119.3)	48.8 (119.8)	39.6 (103.3)	30.0 (86.0)	52.5 (126.5)
Mean daily maximum °C (°F)	20.6 (69.1)	23.3 (73.9)	26.2 (79.2)	30.4 (86.7)	35.3 (95.5)	40.1 (104.2)	42.3 (108.1)	41.3 (106.3)	39.0 (102.2)	32.7 (90.9)	25.4 (77.7)	20.3 (68.5)	31.4 (88.5)
Daily mean °C (°F)	13.2 (55.8)	15.2 (59.4)	17.8 (64.0)	21.2 (70.2)	25.6 (78.1)	30.3 (86.5)	33.9 (93.0)	33.4 (92.1)	30.6 (87.1)	23.9 (75.0)	17.2 (63.0)	13.1 (55.6)	23.0 (73.4)
Mean daily minimum °C (°F)	5.9 (42.6)	7.0 (44.6)	9.3 (48.7)	12.1 (53.8)	16.0 (60.8)	20.5 (68.9)	25.6 (78.1)	25.5 (77.9)	22.2 (72.0)	15.1 (59.2)	9.0 (48.2)	5.8 (42.4)	14.5 (58.1)
Record low °C (°F)	−6.5 (20.3)	−3.0 (26.6)	0.0 (32.0)	2.5 (36.5)	5.0 (41.0)	7.5 (45.5)	14.0 (57.2)	13.5 (56.3)	11.0 (51.8)	2.3 (36.1)	−1.0 (30.2)	−4.0 (24.8)	−6.5 (20.3)
Average precipitation mm (inches)	8.4 (0.33)	4.4 (0.17)	2.7 (0.11)	1.3 (0.05)	0.2 (0.01)	0.3 (0.01)	4.1 (0.16)	7.3 (0.29)	6.8 (0.27)	3.1 (0.12)	2.8 (0.11)	7.0 (0.28)	48.4 (1.91)
Average precipitation days (≥ 0.1 mm)	1.1	0.7	0.6	0.3	0.1	0.1	0.5	0.9	0.3	0.5	0.4	0.9	6.4
Source: Servicio Meteorológico Nacional (Mexico's Meteorological Service)

== Economy ==
Maquila factories in San Luis Río Colorado include TSE Brakes, Daewoo Electronics, Bose, Flextronics, Yazaki, SANA International, and Gaming Partners International.

== Transportation ==
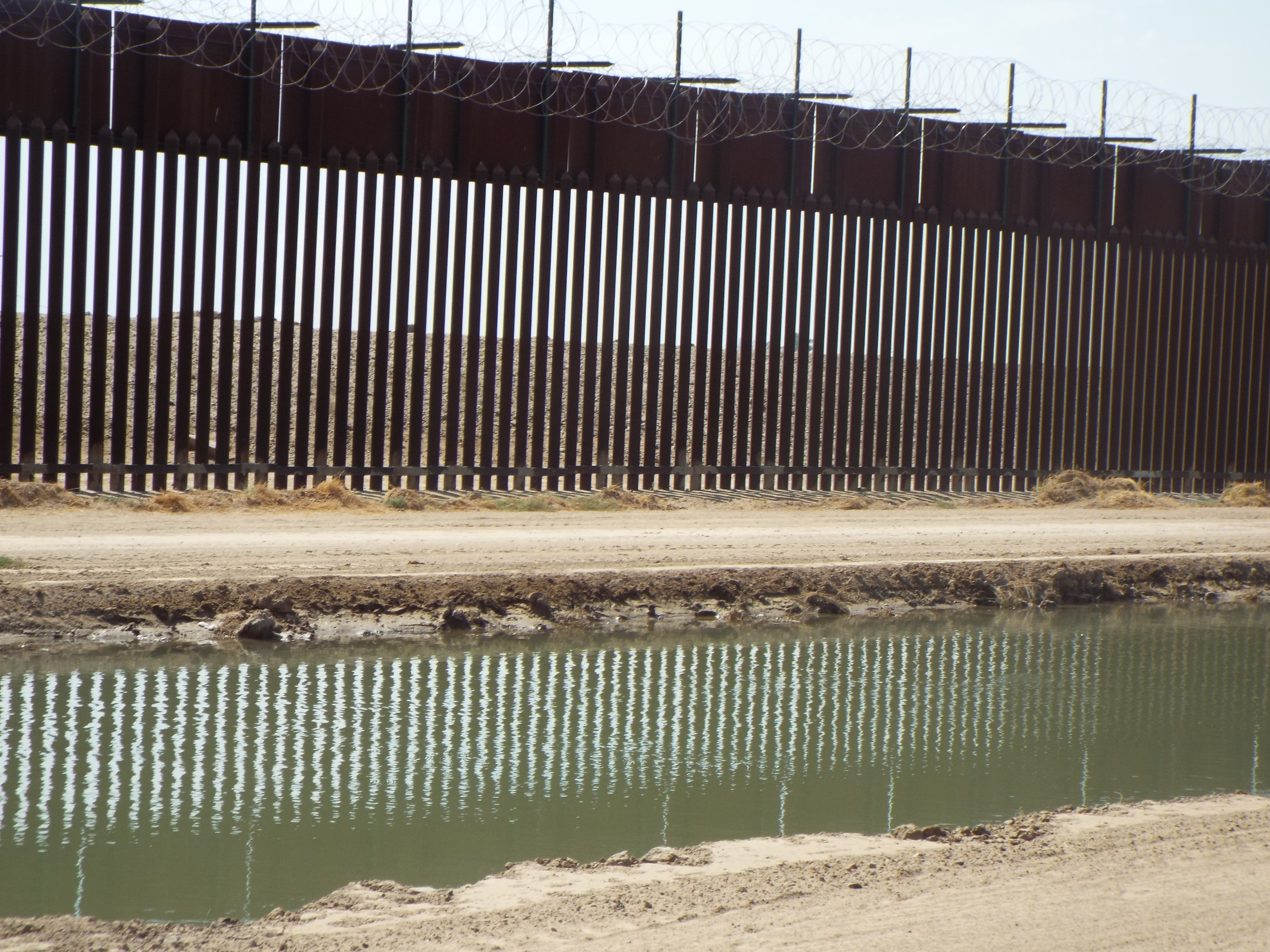
Border wall between the United States and Mexico in San Luis, Arizona

San Luis Río Colorado Airport used to be the general aviation airport serving this city until it was demolished in the early 2020s. However, the nearest International airport to San Luis Río Colorado is Mexicali International Airport near Mexicali. San Luis Río Colorado has highway connections to other parts of Mexico (Sonora State Highway 40 and Mexican Federal Highway 2). There is a border crossing with San Luis, Arizona. Several intercity bus companies (including TUFESA) stop at the San Luis Río Colorado bus station.

== Notable people ==
- Alfredo Aceves (born 1982), professional baseball player
- Paty Díaz (born 1974), telenovela actress
- Efraín Escudero (born 1986), MMA fighter for the UFC
- Jorge Páez (born 1965), former WBO and IBF Champion
- Carlos Palomino (born 1949), former WBC Welterweight Champion and member of the International Boxing Hall of Fame
- Rogelio Medina (born 1988), boxing Middleweight contender
- Ignacio Mondaca Romero (1956–2021), writer, author of Relatos de Ocio among other books
- Jesús Sánchez García (born 1989), professional footballer for Club Deportivo Guadalajara
- Roberto Vizcarra (born 1967), professional baseball player and manager
