= San Ignacio Cohuirimpo =

- Interactive map of San Ignacio Cohuirimpo
- Coordinates: 27°3′N 109°25′W
- Country: Mexico
- State: Sonora
- Municipality: Navojoa
- Comisaría, Colonia: San Ignacio Cohuirimpo

Government
  - Municipal president: Raul Silva Vela
- Elevation: 50 m (160 ft)

Population (2005)
  - Total: 10,606
  - Municipality population: 169,782
- Town
- Time zone: UTC–07:00 (Zona Pacífico)
- Area code: 642

San Ignacio Cohuirimpo is a small town and comisaría in the Navojoa Municipality, in the Mexican state of Sonora. It is the most important comisaría in Navojoa City and the biggest, too. San Ignacio was one of the main areas where the "Mayos", the indigenous people of Navojoa, could be found. At present, it can be considered a part of the metropolitan area, as it has grown urbanely thanks to the work of the municipal government of Navojoa.

During the April 8th eclipse in 2024, San Ignacio Cohuirimpo had 88% coverage.

== Transportation ==
The main avenues connecting Navojoa and San Ignacio Cohuirimpo are Morelos and Mariano Jimenez, which become Emiliano Zapata Street on San Ignacio Cohuirimpo. Centenario Boulevard is a fast way to get to the town from center and northern Navojoa. The urban public transport routes of Navojoa, named SUBA, don't enter San Ignacio Cohuirimpo. The closest of them all is the 7th route, which leads to Navojoa's Periférico around San Ignacio. Also, it has its own two bus routes.

=== Highways ===
Navojoa's Periférico (semi-beltway) can be accessed via Morelos or Jimenez Avenue. It connects with Mexican Federal Highway 15.

There are several state routes that run to surrounding towns.
