= Hechos =

Mexican television news show

Hechos logo in 2006

Hechos (Facts) is the news program of TV Azteca in Mexico, aired on its Azteca Uno network. Hechos newscasts air in the morning, at midday and at 9pm on weekdays and weekdays on Saturdays.

All three weekday editions of Hechos beat Televisa's competing newscasts in the ratings in September 2016.

== History ==
Hechos came to air in February 1994, months after the privatization of Imevisión led to the launch of Azteca as a private broadcaster.

== Editions ==
Hechos airs Primera Linea AM, Hechos AM, Hechos Aquí Entre Nos, Hechos Meridiano and Hechos con Javier Alatorre.

Hechos Sabado con Carolina Rocha airs on Saturdays.

Hechos Domingo con Jorge Zarza airs on Sundays.

== Local opt-outs ==
TV Azteca produces various regional news bulletins which are produced in major cities and inserted into the schedules of Azteca Uno transmitters in their respective local areas. These cover up portions of other programs and/or the national late news. These are titled Hechos (region name), with such programs including Hechos Veracruz, Hechos Sonora Sur (covering Ciudad Obregón) and Hechos Baja California Sur. These programs also air in morning, midday and late time slots.

== Foreign adaptations ==
Hechos was also produced in Chile by La Red TV when it was part of TV Azteca.

In 2017, TV Azteca launched A Más+, 7.2 national channel, replacing AzNoticias, producing 2 news programs known as Ahora Más, in afternoon and evening hours
