= Yavaros =

Fishing port in Sonora, Mexico

Coordinates: 26°42′N 109°31′W

Yavaros is a fishing ports of Sonora state in Mexico and is one of six ports within the state. The population of Yavaros is 4,058. It is located within Huatabampo Municipality.
