= Huatabampo Municipality =

Coordinates: 26.7228°N 109.4856°W

- Municipality
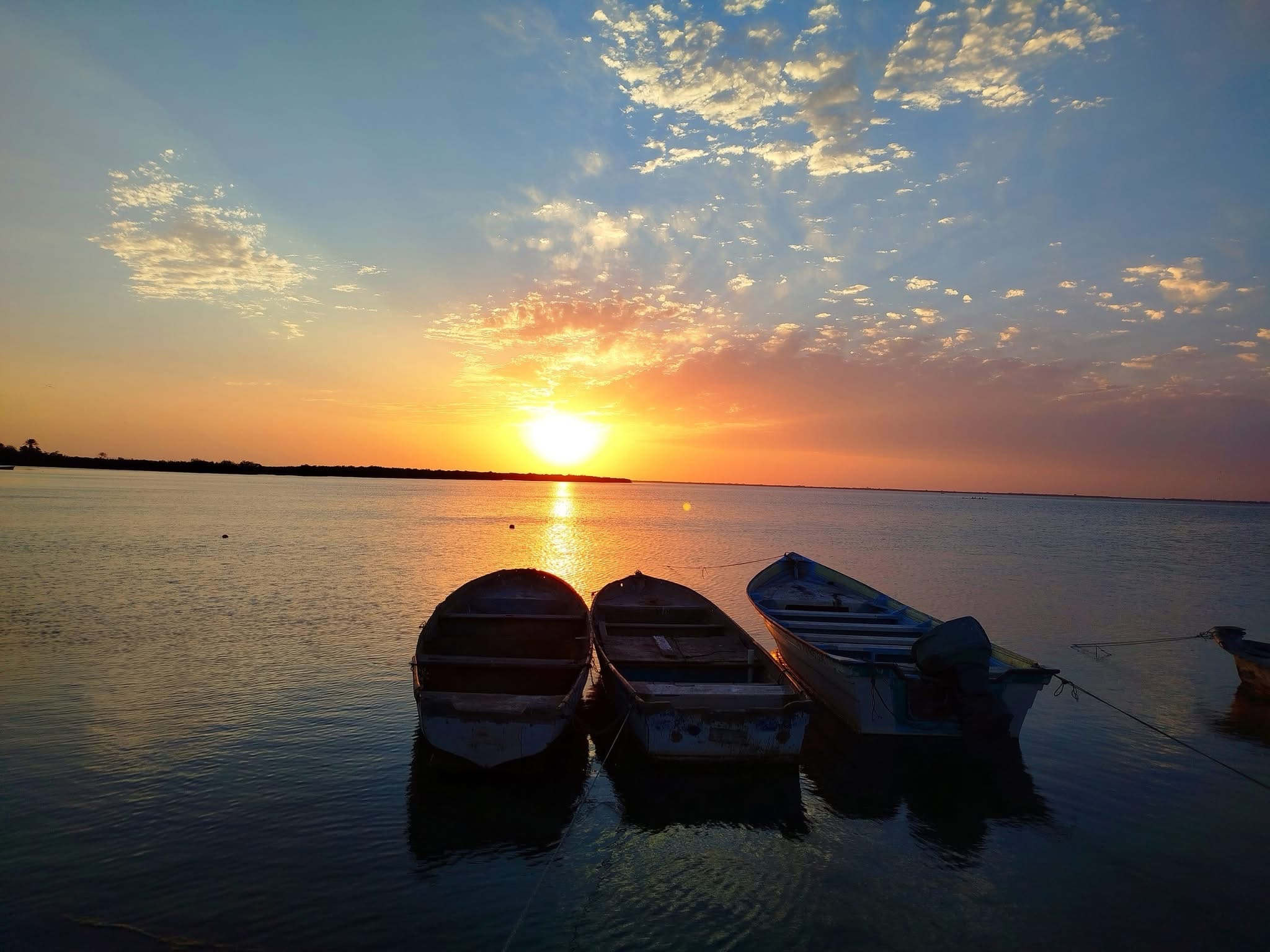
- Sunset in the town of Yavaros

- Coat of arms
- Interactive map of Huatabampo Municipality
- Country: Mexico
- State: Sonora
- Municipal seat: Huatabampo

Population (2015)
  - Total: 80,524
- Time zone: UTC–07:00 (Zona Pacífico)

Huatabampo is a municipality in the state of Sonora in northwestern Mexico, being the southernmost municipality in Sonora. As of 2015, the municipality had a total population of 80,524.

The municipal seat is the city of Huatabampo.

The area of the municipality (urban and rural) is 1,169.92 km^{2}.

== Government ==
=== Municipal presidents ===
Municipal president	Term	Political party	Notes
Pedro H. Zubarrán	1899–1901		
Trinidad B. Rosas	1907–1909		
José Tiburcio Otero	1909–1911		
Álvaro Obregón	1911–1912		
Benjamín Almada	1913–1915		
Octavio Bojórquez	1915–1917		
Bernardo J. Gastélum	1917–1918		
Alejo Goycochea	1918–1920		
Alfredo Goycochea	1920–1921		
José Toledo	1921–1922		
Rodolfo Ruiz Rábago	1923		
Agustín Murillo	1924–1925		
José Tiburcio Otero	1925		
Federico Vázquez	1925–1927		
Emilio Rosas	1928		
Rodrigo Otero	1930–1931	PNR	
Ramón F. Ibarra T.	1932	PNR	Acting municipal president
Praxedis Gastélum	1932–1935	PNR	
Antonio Encinas	1935–1937	PNR	
Anastasio Barreras	1937–1939	PNR	
Rodolfo Castro V.	1939–1941	PRM	
Antonio Toledo	1941–1943	PRM	
Abelardo Paredes	1943–1946	PRM	
Ignacio Valderráin	1946–1949	PRI	
N/A	1949–1952		
Alfredo Santini E.	1952–1955	PRI	
Jesús Ibarra R.	1955–1958	PRI	
Víctor M. Romo	1958–1961	PRI	
Alfredo Káram M.	1961–1964	PRI	
Martín Larrauri G.	1964–1965	PRI	
Arnoldo Ahumada B.	1965–1967	PRI	
Próspero M. Ibarra	1967–1970	PRI	
Francisco Rosas Ibarra	1970–1973	PRI	
Manuel Castro T.	1973–1976	PRI	
Arturo Siqueiros S.	1976–1979	PRI	
Rodolfo Moreno G.	1979–1982	PRI	
Roberto Rosas T.	1982–1985	PRI	
Germán Bleizeffer Luis	1985–1988	PRI	
Heliodoro Soto Rodríguez	1988–1991	PRI	
Luis Alberto Ibarra Guerra	1991–1994	PRI	
Bleizeffer Vega	1994–1997	PRI	
Francisco García Cancino	1997–2000	PRD	
Daniel Ibarra Guerra	2000–2003	PRI	
Juan José Lam Angulo	16-09-2003–15-09-2006	PRD; PAS; Convergence	
César Bleizeffer Vega	16-09-2006–15-09-2009	PAN	
Próspero Manuel Ibarra Otero	16-09-2009–15-09-2012	PRI; PVEM; Panal	
Ramón Antonio Díaz Nieblas	16-09-2012–15-09-2015	PAN; Panal	
Heliodoro Soto Olguín	16-09-2015–15-09-2018	PRI; PVEM; Panal	Coalition "For an Honest and Effective Government"
Ramón Antonio Díaz Nieblas	16-09-2018–15-09-2021	PAN; PRD	Coalition "For Sonora to the Front"
Juan Jesús Flores Mendoza	16-09-2021–15-09-2024	Morena	
Alberto Vázquez Valencia	16-09-2024–	Morena; PVEM; PT; Panal Sonora; PES Sonora	
