= Etchojoa Municipality =

Coordinates: 27.0177°N 109.6654°W

Etchojoa Municipio de Etchojoa
- Municipality
- Municipality of Etchojoa
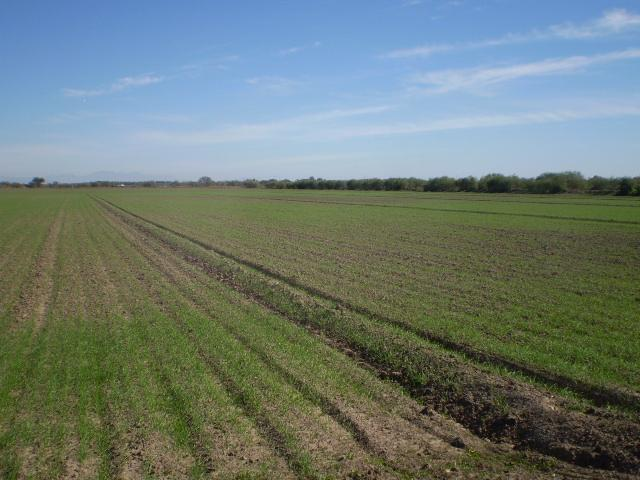
- Farmland in Etchojoa

- Coat of arms

- Location of the municipality in Sonora
- Country: Mexico
- State: Sonora
- Municipal seat: Etchojoa
- Established: October 15, 1909

Government
  - Mayor: Jesús Tadeo Mendívil Valenzuela

Area
  - Total: 949.85 km^{2} (366.74 sq mi)
- Elevation: 50 m (160 ft)
- Highest elevation: 200 m (660 ft)

Population (2020)
  - Total: 61,309
- Time zone: UTC-07:00 (Zona Pacífico)
- Postal code: 85280–85288
- Area code: 647
- Website: etchojoa.gob.mx

Etchojoa is one of the seventy-two municipalities in the Mexican state of Sonora. It is located in the southern part of the state, in the Mayo Valley area and on the coast of the Gulf of California. Its municipal seat and most inhabited town is Etchojoa. Other important towns include Bacobampo, Buaysiacobe, and Bacame Nuevo. It also includes the rural town of Colonia Soto. The municipality was founded on October 15, 1909.

According to the Population and Housing Census carried out in 2020 by the National Institute of Statistics and Geography (INEGI), the municipality has a total of 61,309 inhabitants, ranking 11th among the most populated in the state, and has an area of 949.85 km^{2} (366.74 sq mi). Its gross domestic product per capita is US$5,701 and its human development index (HDI) is 0.7223. Like most municipalities in Sonora, the name was given because of its municipal head.
