= Mayo River (Mexico) =

Mayo River Rio Mayo en Mesa Colorada
- Location of mouth

Location
- Country: Mexico
- State: Sonora

Physical characteristics
- Mouth: Gulf of California
  - coordinates: 26°43′48″N 109°47′32″W

The Mayo River is located in the Mexican state of Sonora.

The Adolfo Ruiz Cortines Dam, named after a former president of Mexico, generates electricity and irrigates agriculture in the Mayo Valley. It is 30 km east of the city of Navojoa, in the municipality of Álamos.

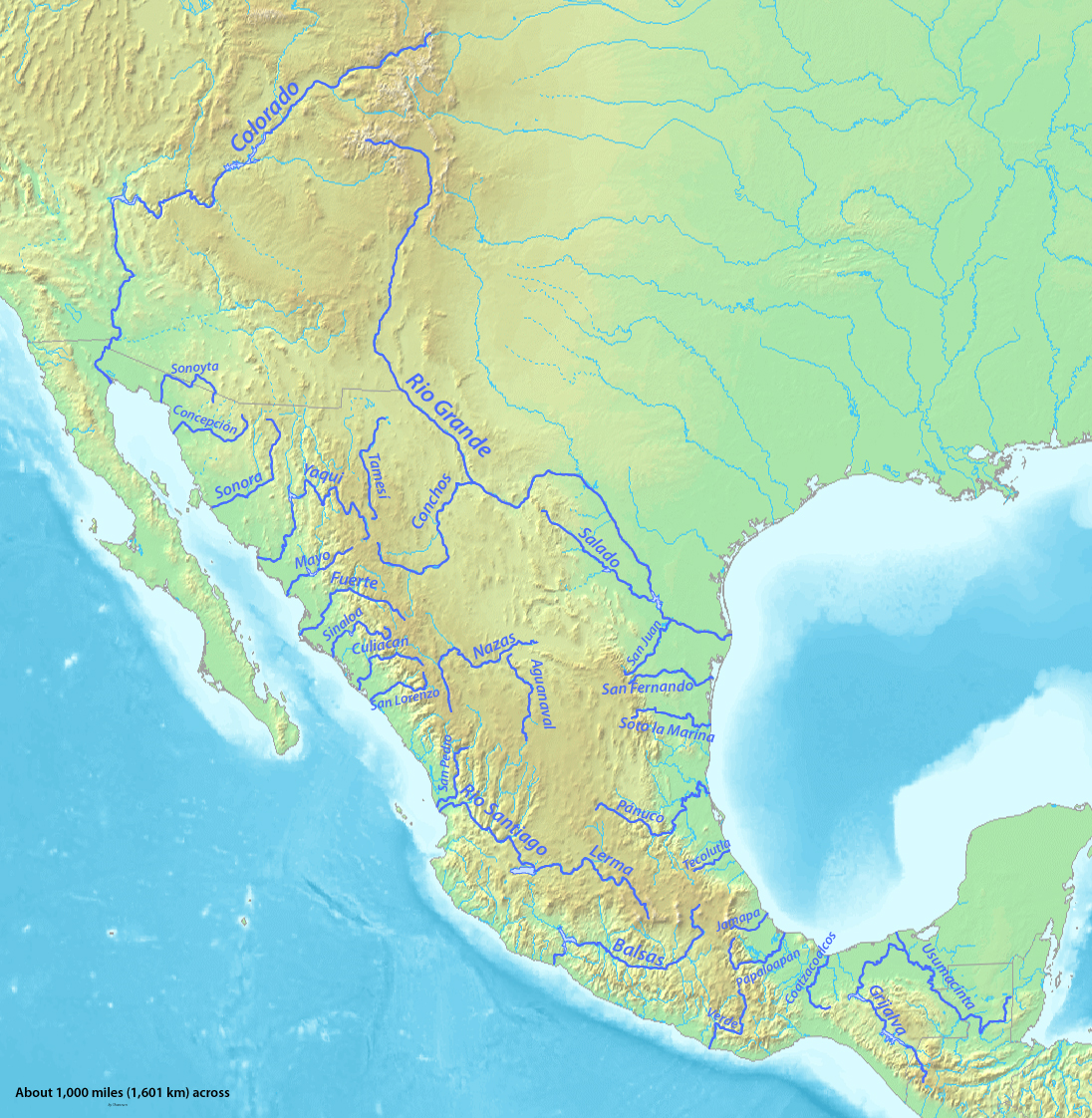
Overview map of major Mexican rivers, including the Mayo

== See also ==
- List of longest rivers of Mexico
