= Armando Zamora =

Mexican writer and musician

Armando Zamora (born 1958, in Hermosillo, Sonora, Mexico) is a journalist, writer and musician. Zamora has written articles, poems, short stories and novels. A number of these deal with topics related to agriculture, many of which are academic in nature. His work has won a number of awards including first place in the Juegos Florales Anita Pompa de Trujillo in 1981, first in the Juegos Feria Amealco 92 in Querétero, the Concurso de Cuento in 1986, and an honorable mention at the World of Poetry in Miami, Florida. His major works include Cuadriludios, Mi corazón es un gato enfermo y al borde del tejado, Equinoccios de la soledad, Bitácora del náufrago y otros poemas and Navegación al interior. His best-known novel is El que se raje es puto. He has also written a large number of magazine articles.
