= César Gándara =

César Gándara is a short story writer and novelist born in Guaymas, Sonora, Mexico in 1971. His work focuses on the everyday lives of the people of this area of the world, which often features the Isla del Tiburón, the Gulf of California and its beaches. His works include Es el viento, El reyno de los niños de Nuevo León and Alguien tiene que perder.
