= List of missionaries to New Spain =

During the Spanish colonization of the Americas from the 16th to 19th centuries, the Spanish Empire established many hundreds of Catholic missions throughout their colonies in the Americas. These missions were founded and staffed by numerous Catholic religious orders of regular clergy. The following is a list of these missionaries to New Spain.

== Augustinians ==
- Diego de Chávez y Alvarado
- Felipe Medrano
- Guillermo de Santa María
- José Francisco de Landa
- Lucas Cabeza de Vaca

== Carmelites ==
- Antonio de la Ascensión

== Dominicans ==
- Bartolomé de las Casas (1484–1566)
- Caietano Pallás
- Crisótomo Gómez
- Domingo Betanzos
- Francisco Galisteo
- Joaquin Valero
- José Estéves
- José Ibar
- José Loriente
- Joseph Sadoc Alemany (1814–1888)
- Juan Crióstomo Gómez
- Luis Sales
- Manuel García
- Miguel Hidalgo
- Vicente Mora

== Franciscans ==
- Agustín Merino (b. 1769)
- Alonso Anselmo de Alcántara
- Alonso de Benavides
- Alonso de Posada
- Ambrosio Calzado (d. 1782)
- Andrés Crespo
- Andrés Dulanto (1774–1808)
- Andrés Quintana (1777–1812)
- Andrés Sánchez
- Ángel Antonio Núñez
- Ángel Fernández Somera y Balbuena (b. 1741)
- Angel Ramírez (d. 1840)
- Antonio Aguilar
- Antonio Beneyte
- Antonio Canals
- Antonio Catarino Rodríguez (1777–1824)
- Antonio Cruzado (1724–1804)
- Antonio Dantí (b. 1760)
- Antonio de Aranda
- Antonio de Ibargaray
- Antonio de la Concepción Horra (b. 1767)
- Antonio de la Concepción Suárez del Real (1804–1850)
- Antonio de los Reyes
- Antonio García
- Antonio Jayme (1757–1829)
- Antonio Jimeno (d. 1876)
- António Margil de Jesús (1657–1726)
- Antonio Paterna (1721–1793)
- Antonio Peyrí (b. 1769)
- Antonio Ramos
- Antonio Ripoll (b. 1785)
- Augustin de Santa Maria
- Baldomero López (b. 1761)
- Baltasar Carnicer (b. 1770)
- Bartolomé Gilí (b. 1759)
- Bartolomé Socies
- Benito Catalán (b. 1766)
- Benito de la Natividad
- Benito de la Sierra (1729–1778)
- Blas Ordaz (1792–1850)
- Buenaventura Fortuny (1774–1840)
- Buenaventura Sitjar (1739–1808)
- Clemente Moreno
- Cristóbal de Quiros
- Cristóbal Oramas (b. 1759)
- Damián Massanet
- Diego de Landa
- Diego Martín García (b. 1744)
- Diego Miguel Bringas de Manzaneda
- Diego Noboa (b. 1742)
- Diego Vidal
- Diego Ximénez
- Domingo Carranza (b. 1770)
- Domingo Juncosa (b. 1740)
- Domingo Santiago Iturrate (1770–c. 1815)
- Enrique Echaso
- Estéban de Perea
- Esteban Salazar
- Esteban Tápis (1756–1825)
- Faustino González
- Faustino Solá (1760–1820)
- Felipe Arroyo de la Cuesta (1780–1842)
- Felipe Guillén (1737–1778)
- Félix Gamarra (1747–1779)
- Fermín de Lasuén (1736–1803)
- Fernando Madueno
- Fernando Martín (1770–1838)
- Fernando Parrón (b. 1728)
- Florencio Ibáñez (1740–1818)
- Francesco Antonio Farnesio (b. 1746)
- Francisco Antonio Barbastro
- Francisco Atanasio Domínguez (1740-1803)
- Francisco Caballero
- Francisco Casañas de Jesús María
- Francisco Cuculla
- Francisco de Ayeta
- Francisco de Paula Rivas
- Francisco de Salazar
- Francisco Garcés (1738–1781)
- Francisco García Diego y Moreno (1785–1846)
- Francisco Gómez (1729–1784)
- Francisco González (b. 1774)
- Francisco González de Ibarra (1782–1842)
- Francisco Iturralde
- Francisco José Arróita (1762–1821)
- Francisco Jurado
- Francisco Moyano
- Francisco Palóu (1723–1789)
- Francisco Pareja (1570–1628)
- Francisco Pujol (1762–1801)
- Francisco Roch
- Francisco Roldán
- Francisco Romero
- Francisco Sánchez (1813–1884)
- Francisco Suñer (1764–1831)
- Francisco Xavier de la Concepción Uría (1770–1834)
- Francisco Yturralde
- Francisco Zuñiga
- García de San Francisco
- Gaspar Guillo
- Gaspar José de Solís
- Gerónimo Boscana (1775–1831)
- Gerónimo de Mendieta
- Gonzalo de Tapia
- Gregório Amúrrio (b. 1744)
- Gregorio Fernández
- Hernando de Covarrubias
- Hilario Torrent (1740–1799)
- Ignacio Ciprián
- Isidro Alonso Salazar (b. 1758)
- Isidro Barcenilla (b. 1766)
- Isidro Félix de Espinosa (1679-1755)
- Jacinto López (b. 1769)
- Jayme Escudé (b. 1779)
- Jerónimo de Zárati Salmerón
- Jesús María Martínez
- Jesús María Vázquez del Mercado (b. 1808)
- Joaquín Pascual Nuez (1785–1821)
- José Almada
- José Altimira (b. 1787)
- José Antonio Anzar (c. 1792–1874)
- José Antonio Calzada (1760–1814)
- José Antonio Caxa
- José Antonio Uría (1769–1815)
- José Antonio Urrestí (1775–1812)
- José Barona (1764–1831)
- José Bernardino de Jesús Pérez (d. 1873)
- José Bernardo Sánchez (1778–1833)
- José Cavaller (1740–1789)
- José de Espeleta
- José de la Cruz Espí de Valencia (1763–1838)
- José de Miguel (1761–1813)
- José del Río
- José de Trujillo
- José Faura (b. 1773)
- José Francisco de Paula Señán (1760–1823)
- José García
- José Gómez
- José González Rubio
- José Lorenzo de la Concepción Quijas
- José Manuel Martiarena (b. 1754)
- José María del Refugio Suárez del Real (b. 1804)
- José María de Zalvidea
- José María Espinosa
- José María Fernández (b. 1770)
- José María Gutiérrez (1801–1850)
- José Maria Pérez Llera
- José Martinez
- José Mora
- José Matías Moreno (1744–1781)
- José Murguía (1715–1784)
- José Nocedal (1746–1778)
- José Panella (b. 1761)
- José Pedro Panto (1778–1812)
- José Ramón Abella (1764–1842)
- José Redondo
- José Soler
- José Viader (b. 1765)
- José Viñals (b. 1759)
- Joseph de Figueroa
- Joseph Matías Moreno (1744–1781)
- Joseph Pérez
- Juan Antonio Barreneche (1749–1781)
- Juan Antonio García Riobó (b. 1740)
- Juan Amorós (1773–1832)
- Juan Bautista Dosal
- Juan Bautista Estelric
- Juan Bautista de Cevallos
- Juan Bautista Llorens
- Juan Bautista Sancho (1772–1830)
- Juan Bautista Torralba
- Juan Cabal
- Juan Crespí (1721–1782)
- Juan Crisóstomo Gil de Bernabé (1729–1773)
- Juan de Prada
- Juan de Salas
- Juan de San Joseph
- Juan de Vidania
- Juan Marcelo Díaz (1736–1781)
- Juan Felipe Martínez
- Juan Figuer (c. 1742–1784)
- Juan Francisco Cobas
- Juan González Vizcaíno (b. 1728)
- Juan José Agorreta
- Juan Lope Cortés (b. 1772)
- Juan Maldonado
- Juan Mariner (1743–1800)
- Juan Martín (1770–1824)
- Juan Moreno (1799–1845)
- Juan Pérez
- Juan Prestamero (b. 1736)
- Juan Ramírez
- Juan Ruíz Torresnuevas
- Juan Sainz de Lucio (b. 1771)
- Juan Sarobe
- Juan Suárez
- Juan P. Gorgol
- Juan Vañó
- Juan Vicente Cabot (1781–c. 1856)
- Julián López (1761–1797)
- Junípero Serra (1713–1784)
- Laureano de Rivas
- Lorenzo Merela (1756–1801)
- Lorenzo Simó
- Luís Antonio Martínez (1771–1832)
- Luís Gil y Taboada (1773–1833)
- Luis Jayme (1740–1775)
- Magín Matías Catalá (1761–1830)
- Manuel Carrasco (1743–1776)
- Manuel de las Cruces
- Manuel Fernández
- Manuel Marín
- Manuel Orduña
- Manuel Zuzarregui
- Marcelino Ciprés (1769–1810)
- Marcelino Marquínez (b. 1779)
- Marcos Amestoy (b. 1778)
- Marcos Antonio Saizar de Vitoria y Odriozola (1760–1836)
- Marcos de Niza (d. 1558)
- Mariano Antonio de Buena y Alcalde
- Mariano Bordoy
- Mariano Payeras (1769–1823)
- Mariano Sosa
- Mariano Rubí (b. 1756)
- Martín de Valencia
- Martín Pérez
- Matías Creo
- Matías de Santa Catalina Noriega (b. 1736)
- Miguel de la Concepción Campa y Cos (1719–1792)
- Miguel de Tobar
- Miguel Francisco Sánchez (1738–1803)
- Miguel Giribet (1756–1804)
- Miguel Muro (1790–1848)
- Miguel Pieras (1741–1795)
- Miguel Sacristán
- Matías de Santa Catalina Noriega (1736–1798)
- Narciso Durán (1776–1846)
- Narciso Gutiérrez (d. 1820)
- Nicolás de Chávez
- Nicolás de Freitas
- Nicolás Lázaro (d. 1807)
- Norberto de Santiago (c. 1760–1810)
- Pablo Joseph Mugártegui (b. 1736)
- Pablo Mota
- Pascual Martínez de Arenaza (1762–1799)
- Pedro Adriano Martínez (b. 1770)
- Pedro Amorós
- Pedro Antonio Arriquibar (d. 1820)
- Pedro Benito Cambón (b. 1738)
- Pedro Cabot (1777–1836)
- Pedro de la Cueva (b. 1776)
- Pedro de San José Estevan (b. 1751)
- Pedro Font (1738–1781)
- Pedro Martínez
- Pedro Muñoz (1773–1818)
- Pedro Ruiz
- Rafael Chávez
- Rafael de Jesús Moreno (1795–1839)
- Rafael Díaz
- Ramón Liberós
- Ramón López
- Ramón Olbés (b. 1786)
- Ramón Usón (b. 1737)
- Román Francisco Fernández de Ulibarri (1773–1821)
- Romualdo Gutiérrez (1782–1845)
- Roque Monares
- Salvador de Guerra
- Sebastián Flores (d. 1784)
- Silvestre Cárdenas
- Silvestre Vélez de Escalante (1750-1780)
- Tomas de Alvarado
- Tomás de la Peña Saravia (1743–1806)
- Tomás de San Diego
- Tomás Eixarch
- Tomás Eleuterio Esténaga (1790–1847)
- Tomás Manso
- Vicente de Santa Maria (1742–1806)
- Vicente Francisco de Sarría (1767–1835)
- Vicente Fustér (1742–1800)
- Vicente Gómez
- Vicente Pascual Oliva (1780–1848)

== Jesuits ==
- Adam Guilg (b. 1652)
- Agustín de Campos (1669–1737)
- Alejandro Romano (1664–1724)
- Alexandro Rapicani (1702–1768)
- Alonso de Arrivillaga
- Alonso Ignacio Benito Espinosa (1720–1786)
- Andrés Pérez de Ribas (1576–1655)
- Andrés Tutino
- Andrés Xavier García (b. 1686)
- Antonio Arras
- Antonio Basilio
- Antonio Leal
- Antonio María Benz (1716–1766)
- Baltazar Carrillo
- Bartolomé Castaño (1601–1672)
- Bartolomé Sáenz (1714–1768)
- Benno Ducrue
- Bernard Middendorff (1723–1794)
- Bernardo Pardo (1619–c. 1685)
- Carlos de Roxas
- Carlos Zelestri
- Cornelius Beudin
- Cristóbal de Cañas (1680–1740)
- Cristóbal de Vallalta
- Cristóbal García
- Custodio Ximeno (b. 1734)
- Daniel Angelo Marras (d. 1689)
- Daniel Januske
- Diego de Acevedo
- Diego de Almonacir
- Diego de la Cruz (b. 1581)
- Diego José Barrera (1726–1782)
- Diego Ortíz de Faronda
- Diego Vandersnipe
- Egidio Montefrío
- Enrique Ruhen (1718–1751)
- Eusebio Kino
- Felipe Esgrecho
- Fernando Bayerca (1663–1730)
- Fernando Consag
- Francis Bennon Ducrue
- Francisco Gonzalvo (1673–1702)
- Francisco Gutiérrez
- Francisco Hlava (1725–1756)
- Francisco María Píccolo
- Francisco Paris
- Francisco Xavier Door
- Francisco Xavier Pauer (1721–1770)
- Francisco Javier Saeta (d. 1695)
- Francisco Xavier Villarroya
- Franz Hermann Glandorf
- Gaspar Stiger (1695–1762)
- Gerónimo de la Canal
- Gerónimo de Moranta
- Gerónimo Figueroa
- Gonzalo de Tapia (1561–1594)
- Guillermo Maluenda
- Hernando de Cabrero
- Hernando de Santarén (d. 1616)
- Hernando de Tovar
- Ignacio de Arzeo
- Ignacio Lizasoin
- Ignacio Molarja
- Ignacio Tirsch (1760s)
- Ignacio Xavier Keller
- Ignacio Yturmendi (d. 1702)
- Ignaz Pfefferkorn (1725–1756)
- Ildefonso de la Peña
- Jacob Baegert
- Jacobo Sedelmayr (1703–1779)
- Jaime Mateu
- Jerónimo Minutuli
- Jorge Hostinki
- José Aguilar (1653–1724)
- José Fora
- José Haffenrichter
- José María Genovese
- José Neve (1739–1773)
- José Osorio
- José Pío Laguna (1734–1768)
- José Toral (d. 1763)
- Joseph Barba
- Joseph de Arjó
- José de Torres Perea (d. 1747)
- Joseph Garrucho (1712–1785)
- Joseph Neumann
- Joseph Och (1725–1773)
- Joseph Felix Pallares
- Juan Antonio de Oviedo (1670–1757)
- Juan Antonio Balthasar (1730s)
- Juan Antonio Zedano (1727–1787)
- Juan Bautista Barli (d. 1694)
- Juan Bautista de Velasco
- Juan Bautista Grazhoffer
- Juan de Almonacir
- Juan de Avendaño
- Juan de Castillejo
- Juan de Guendulain
- Juan de la Plaza
- Juan de San Martín
- Juan de Ugarte
- Juan Echagoyan
- Juan Fernandez Cavera
- Juan Fonte (d. 1616)
- Juan Muñoz de Burgos
- Juan Nentuig
- Juan Ortiz de Zapata
- Juan Maria Salvatierra (1648–1717)
- Julio Pascual (d. 1632)
- Lambert Hostell
- Lorenzo Carranco (d. 1734)
- Lorenzo de Cárdenas (1596–1656)
- Lorenzo Ignacio Gutiérrez
- Luis Lucas Alvarez
- Luis Mancuso
- Luís María Gallardi (d. 1736)
- Luís María Marciano
- Luis María Pineli
- Luis Vivas (b. 1720)
- Luis Xavier Velarde
- Manuel Aguirre
- Manuel de Benavides
- Manuel Gonzáles (1645–1702)
- Manuel Martinez (d. 1632)
- Manuel Sánchez
- Marcos Antonio Kappus
- Marcos Burriel
- Marcos de Loyola
- Marcos de Somoza
- Marcos del Río
- Martín Azpilcueta (1596–1637)
- Martín Burgencio
- Martín Peláez
- Martín Pérez
- Melchor Bartíromo
- Miguel Capetillo
- Miguel de la Vega
- Miguel Gerstner (1723–1756)
- Nicolás de Anaya
- Nicolás de Oro
- Nicolás de Perera
- Nicolás Hidalgo
- Nicolás Tamaral (d. 1734)
- Pedro Antonio Díaz
- Pedro Bueno
- Pedro de Barcelón
- Pedro de Hortigosa
- Pedro de Sandoval
- Pedro Martinez (d. 1566)
- Pedro Matías Goni
- Pedro Mendez (d. 1642)
- Pedro Pantoja
- Pedro Ruiz de Contreras
- Philipp Segesser
- Rodrigo de Cabredo
- Sigismundo Taraval
- Tomás Altamirano
- Tomás Basilio (1582–1654)
- Tomás Tello (1720–1751)

== Mercedarians ==
- Francisco de Cuevas
