= Ignacio Xavier Keller =

18th-century Jesuit Missionary

Ignacio Xavier Keller (November 11, 1702 – August 1759) was a Jesuit missionary to Mexico at Mission Santa María Suamca. His treatment of Pima leader Luis Oacpicagigua was an inciting factor in the Pima Revolt of 1751.

== Biography ==
=== Early life ===
Keller was born on November 11, 1702 in Olomouc, Moravia. He joined the Society of Jesus on October 17, 1717.

Dispatched to the Americas as a missionary, Keller arrived in Veracruz, Mexico on April 19, 1731, alongside fellow missionaries Philipp Segesser and Juan Bautista Grazhoffer. After recovering from a bout of typhus, he was accompanied by Juan Bautista de Anza to his assigned mission, where Keller remained for about a year. In 1732, he was reassigned further north, at Mission Santa María Suamca, where he arrived on April 20.

=== Mission Santa María Suamca ===
Keller remained at Santa María Suamca for the rest of his life. Historian Kevin Starr, describing the "whippings and confinement in stocks" with which the Jesuits punished the natives, characterizes Keller as "notably harsh – and therefore particularly hated." Keller himself described his experiences at the mission:

All I received were uncivilized and scattered Indians. I had the winds to breathe with nothing more for sustenance. I had the open country in which to sleep, with no cover but the heavens ... My neophytes had no oxen, nor did they know how to plow, until two years later when I acquired four ... Because of the lack of provisions I was not able to go ahead with the building of a church, not even a house. Thus I persevered living for years in a straw-thatched hut like the natives, sustaining myself and them on the alms I would go out to beg for.

In 1736 and 1737, Keller explored along the Gila River, visiting local Pima villages on the way. He baptized fifty-two native children during his visits, naming all twenty-six girls Catalina and all twenty-six boys Ignacio. Eventually, Keller was forced to turn back due to encounters with hostile Apaches. He attempted the journey again in 1745, and was again repelled.

=== Pima Revolt ===
In 1751, Pima leader Luis Oacpicagigua visited Santa María Suamca along with his two sons and his ally Luis Batiutuc. According to Oacpicagigua's later testimony, he gave Keller a letter from Diego Ortiz Parrilla, and asked him about the location of Santiago Ruiz de Ael. Keller, who may have been drunk at the time, responded dismissively, threatening to burn the letter, publicly criticizing Oacpicagigua for his Spanish style of clothing and weapons. Despite Oacpicagigua's attempts at compliance, Keller grew increasingly irate; he called Oacpicagigua "effeminate", "good for nothing", and a "Chichimeca dog", and accused him of forming an alliance with the Apache.

Not long after, Oacpicagigua led the 1751 Pima Revolt. His conditions for peace included the demand that Keller be removed from his position, and he did not ultimately surrender until informed that Keller would be sent away. Once captured and interrogated, Oacpicagigua described Keller's insults as the main precipitating cause of his rebellion. His right-hand man, Pedro de la Cruz, also accused the Jesuits, including Keller, of mistreating the natives:

I am not the cause of the rebellion. Those who have caused it are Fathers Jacobo Sedelmayr, Ignacio Xavier Keller, and Joseph Garrucho, because of the severity with which they and their mayordomos treat the Indians.

After the revolt, Keller was summoned before the viceroy in Mexico City on charges of abuse towards the natives. At the end of a five-year investigation, the viceroy concluded that the Pima Revolt could not be attributed to the actions of any one person, and Keller was allowed to return to his post.

=== Later life ===
Records from December 1753 show that Keller baptized 28 Indian children in a single month. These children were brought to him by Spanish settlers; the settlers would keep the children as criados (servants), or sell them to purchasers such as Juan Tomás de Beldarrain, captain of Presidio San Ignacio de Tubac.

In 1756, Keller accompanied Miguel Gerstner and Francisco Hlava to the San Pedro Valley in the hope of establishing a mission church there, but the three priests were repelled by the natives.

Keller died in August 1759.
