= Francisco Xavier Pauer =

18th-century Jesuit missionary

Francisco Xavier Pauer (January 6, 1721 – January 6, 1770) was a Jesuit missionary to Mexico. He replaced Joseph Garrucho at Mission Los Santos Ángeles de Guevavi after the Pima Revolt of 1751, and worked in the area until the expulsion of the Jesuits in 1767.

== Biography ==
Pauer was born on January 6, 1721, in Brno, Moravia. He entered the Society of Jesus in October 1737, and studied at the Jesuit College of Olomouc. Pauer left for the Americas on June 16, 1750, arrived in Veracruz on August 23rd, and traveled from there to Mexico City. That fall, he set out along the west coast with a group of nine other Jesuits, and arrived in the Pimería Alta in spring 1751.

Pauer spent a little while serving at Mission San Xavier del Bac and Presidio San Ignacio de Tubac. With native assistance, Pauer fled the Pima Revolt, along with the other Jesuits in the area. Not long after, Pauer returned to take over Mission Los Santos Ángeles de Guevavi from Joseph Garrucho, who was removed from his position there as a condition of peace. Natives questioned in the subsequent investigation reported that they liked Pauer and had no complaints about him.

In 1753, concerned by general unrest among the natives, Pauer retreated first to Mission Santa María Suamca, then to Mission San Miguel de Ures. He returned to Guevavi in December of the same year. At the beginning of January 1754, he traveled through his diocese, baptizing 38 native children at Tubac, 23 at Bac, 28 at Mission San Agustín del Tucson, and 10 at Guevavi. Pauer also made a trip to Mission Nuestra Señora de la Asunción de Arizpe, to retrieve church furnishings which had been kept there during the revolt. In October he fell sick, and went again to Suamca, where he reported on the state of his mission to the visiting Joseph de Utrera. When Pauer returned to Guevavi, he was accompanied by Alonso Ignacio Benito Espinosa, who stayed with him while waiting for a house to be built at Bac. On May 14, 1755, Pauer made his final vows at Arizpe.

In 1756, Pauer founded Mission San Cayetano de Calabazas. Over the next few years, Pauer continued to travel between the local missions, baptizing children and recruiting natives from the surrounding area to replace those the mission lost from disease. He stood godfather to several of the children of Juan Tomás de Beldarrain, captain of Tubac. The mission was frequently raided by Luis Oacpicagigua's Pima followers, but continued to grow.

Under Pauer's administration, churches were built at Mission San Ignacio de Sonoitac and Mission San José de Tumacácori. Miguel Gerstner joined him briefly at Guevavi in January 1757, and Bernardo Middendorff did the same in August. In January 1760, Pauer was promoted to Father Rector of Pimería Alta, and accordingly reassigned to San Ignacio.

In July 1767, Spanish soldiers arrived to carry out the orders of Charles III by expelling the Jesuits from Mexico. Along with about fifty other Jesuits Pauer was escorted to a church in Mátape, near Hermosillo. From there, the soldiers took them to Guaymas, across the Gulf of Mexico, through Tepic, and to Guadalajara. Many of the Jesuits died on the way, but a few, including Pauer, survived to reach Cádiz in Spain. Pauer died there on January 6, 1770.
