= Andrés Xavier García =

Spanish Jesuit missionary (1686–??)

Andrés Xavier García was a Jesuit missionary in New Spain.

== Biography ==
García was born in 1686 in Extremadura, Spain, entered the Society of Jesus in 1705, and made his final vows in 1720. He embarked for the Americas from El Puerto de Santa María on 22 November 1735. There were more than forty Jesuits aboard the ship with him, including Alexandro Rapicani and Jacobo Sedelmayr. On 18 February 1736, they were shipwrecked on the island of San Juan de Ulúa; there were no casualties, and the Jesuits continued on to Mexico City.

By 1737, García was Visitor General of the Jesuits in New Spain. That spring, he visited several of the Sonoran missions, including Mission Los Santos Ángeles de Guevavi and Mission Santa María Suamca. He served as provincial superior from 1747 to 1750.

As provincial superior, García supported the construction of the Convent of Corpus Christi, Mexico City in Mexico City for indigenous women, arguing that they were honest, humble, and as intelligent as Europeans. He also altered the Jesuit regulations on corporal punishment of natives in a 1747 order, raising the maximum number of lashes from eight to twenty-five.

García's last known post was as spiritual advisor at the Colegio Seminario de San Gregorio in Mexico.
