= Luís María Gallardi =

Sicilian Jesuit missionary (died 1736)

Luís María Gallardi (died 1736) was a Sicilian Jesuit missionary to New Spain.

== Biography ==
Gallardi, a Sicilian, arrived in the Pimería Alta in 1720, joining fellow missionaries Eusebio Kino, Agustín de Campos, and Luis Xavier Velarde. He was assigned to the Caborca mission for two years, before relocating in 1722 to Mission Santa María Magdalena. In 1725 he became the administrator of the Altar River valley, and accordingly relocated to San Ignacio.

Gallardi moved again in 1727 to Tubutama, where he served for the rest of his life. A 1730 account describes Gallardi punishing two of the native Pima, and the natives retaliating by shooting arrows into Gallardi's room while he slept. Juan Bautista Grazhoffer assisted Gallardi at the mission for a few months, leaving in 1732. Gallardi died in Tubutama on January 1, 1736.
