= Salvador de Guerra =

Franciscan missionary

Salvador de Guerra was a Franciscan missionary to New Spain. He was investigated and sentenced in 1655 for abuse of the Hopi at his mission. Later, he served as secretary to Alonso de Posada, and was involved with the Inquisition investigation of Governor Bernardo López de Mendizábal.

== Biography ==
Guerra was stationed in 1652 at a mission near Shongopovi, Arizona, where he served as resident missionary to the local Hopi.

=== Investigation for abuse ===
In 1655, a group of native leaders came to Antonio de Ibargaray, the custos of New Mexico, with reports of abuse by Guerra. Other native witnesses confirmed that Guerra habitually used whipping and tarring with hot turpentine as a punishment on the natives, "especially boys and girls guilty of immoral conduct." Most recently, Guerra had punished Juan Cuna, a Hopi from Oraibi village, for "idolatry". Guerra had publicly beaten him until Cuna was "bathed in blood", beaten him a second time inside the church, and then tarred him with burning turpentine; Cuna had died from the treatment. One account claimed that Guerra had deliberately ridden Cuna down with his horse and killed him, in order to prevent him from reporting to secular authorities.

When questioned, Guerra confirmed his use of beating and tarring as punishments, especially when he found evidence of traditional Hopi religious practice in the form of feathers or kachina dolls. He denied the additional Hopi accusation that, when using their labor for the weaving of mantas, he provided insufficient material and beat them if they wove too slowly. On July 17, Ibargaray concluded the investigation, and ordered that Guerra appear before the superiors of the order in Mexico City for punishment.

=== Later career ===
Guerra was subsequently confined for some time in the mission at Quarai, and temporarily forbidden from saying Mass. He was then transferred to Jemez Pueblo, and subsequently served at several missions in New Mexico, including San Agustín de la Isleta. Another Franciscan, Benito de la Natividad, described an incident at Isleta, in which Guerra attempted to interfere in the Hopi kachina dance:

Fray Salvador de Guerra, not being able to restrain them in any other way, went throughout the pueblo with a cross upon his shoulders, a crown of thorns, and a rope about his neck, beating his naked body, in order that they might stop the dance. When he reached a certain part of the pueblo, they came after him weeping, and saying that they were not to blame, because the governor had commanded them to do as they were doing.

In 1661, Guerra was assigned as secretary to Alonso de Posada. In that capacity, he was involved with the Inquisition investigation of Governor Bernardo López de Mendizábal. In 1664, Guerra was reassigned to the Hopi, this time at Mission San Bernardo de Aguatubi.
