= Custodio Ximeno =

Jesuit missionary to New Spain

Custodio Ximeno was a Jesuit missionary to New Spain. He served at Mission Los Santos Ángeles de Guevavi from 1763 until the 1767 expulsion of the Jesuits from Mexico.

== Biography ==
Ximeno was born in Valdelinares on 1 May 1734. He entered the Society of Jesus on 29 September 1752, and studied theology at Zaragoza. In June 1760, he embarked from El Puerto de Santa María for the Americas.

In Mexico, Ximeno completed his studies and was ordained. Joseph Garrucho, the Jesuit Father Visitor, assigned him to Mission Los Santos Ángeles de Guevavi. In spring 1763, Ximeno traveled there in the company of his close friend, Francisco Xavier Villarroya.

During the fall and winter of 1764, Ximeno suffered from quartan fever.

In July 1767, Spanish soldiers from Presidio Santa Gertrudis del Altar arrived to carry out the orders of Charles III by expelling the Jesuits from Mexico. Along with about fifty other Jesuits, Ximeno was escorted to a church in Mátape, near Hermosillo. From there, the soldiers took them to Guaymas, across the Gulf of Mexico, through Tepic, and to Guadalajara. Many of the Jesuits died on the way, but a few, including Ximeno, survived to reach Cádiz in Spain.
