= Francisco Xavier Villarroya =

Jesuit missionary in New Spain

Francisco Xavier Villarroya (1734–1768) was a Jesuit missionary to New Spain.

== Biography ==
Villarroya was born in Villarroya de los Pinares, Spain, on November 20, 1734. Along with his close friend and fellow Jesuit, Custodio Ximeno, Villarroya traveled to Sonora in the spring of 1763. The two men were also accompanied by Juan Claudio de Pineda, the new governor of Sonora.

Villarroya was initially assigned to Missions Los Siete Príncipes del Átil and San Pedro y San Pablo del Tubutama. In August 1763, he was reassigned to Mission Nuestra Señora de los Remedios de Banámichi. Over the next few years, he served intermittently at Banámichi, Mission Santa María de Bacerac, and Mission San Miguel de Ures.

In July 1767, Spanish soldiers from Presidio Santa Gertrudis del Altar arrived to carry out the orders of Charles III by expelling the Jesuits from Mexico. Along with about fifty other Jesuits, Villarroya was escorted to a church in Mátape, near Hermosillo. From there, the soldiers took them to Guaymas, down the Gulf of California, through Tepic, and to Guadalajara. Many of the Jesuits died on the way, including Villarroya, who died on September 1, 1768, in Ixtlán del Río.
