= Joseph Garrucho =

18th-century Jesuit missionary

José Antonio Garrucho (1712–1785) was a Jesuit missionary to Mexico, who served at Mission Los Santos Ángeles de Guevavi and Mission San Miguel Arcángel de Oposura. He was implicated in the events leading up to the Pima Revolt of 1751.

== Biography ==
=== Early life ===
Garrucho was born on March 27, 1712, in Sardinia, and entered the Society of Jesus on January 6, 1731. He left Sardinia for Spain on October 23, 1740, and left Spain for the Americas in February 1744. His ship, the San Francisco, was boarded by English privateers, who marooned the Jesuit passengers near Puerto del Príncipe. The Jesuits received a warm welcome at the port, and remained there for about a month before proceeding to Havana and thence to Mexico City.

=== Mission work ===
In early 1745, Garrucho set out for the Pimería Alta. There, Ignacio Xavier Keller installed him as resident missionary at Mission San Rafael de Guevavi, which Garrucho renamed to San Miguel de Guevavi. Shortly after Garrucho's arrival, the Pima fled the mission en masse; with the help of Pedro Vicente de Tagle Bustamante, a captain from the nearby Presidio San Felipe de Gracia Real de Terrenate, Keller and Garrucho were able to bribe the natives into returning.

Some of the natives baptized by Garrucho at the Guevavi mission were sold into slavery immediately afterwards. For example, baptismal records show that on April 22, 1746, Garrucho baptized a five- or six-year-old native, giving him the name of José Luis. Juan Timotheo de Robles bought the child on behalf of Nicholás Romero, a local gente de razón.

Guevavi was struck by three major epidemics during Garrucho's tenure, in 1747, 1749, and 1751. Garrucho offset the consequent reductions in population by bringing Pima into the mission, sometimes by bribery, sometimes by force. He assigned them to various forms of agricultural labor on the mission ranch, where they sometimes worked more than the three days per week allowed by law.

Garrucho made his solemn vows on December 10, 1748, at Mission Nuestra Señora de la Asunción de Arizpe. By 1751, the mission was prosperous enough that Garrucho commissioned master builder Joaquín de Casares to plan a new church, built with Pima labor. Work began late that summer. In the fall, Garrucho hosted Luis Oacpicagigua and his warriors, visiting the mission on their way to assist the Spanish against Apache forces.

=== Pima revolt ===
On September 29, 1751, Garrucho threw a large celebration for the feast of San Miguel. Attendees included Nicholás Romero; Miguel Valenzuela, a retired sergeant; Juan Manuel Ortiz, from Agua Caliente; Francisco Padilla, a prospector; Gabriel Antonio de Vildósola, son of Agustín de Vildósola; Francisco Xavier Pauer, a missionary; and Pedro de la Cruz, Oacpicagigua's right-hand man. During the festivities, Garrucho confronted de la Cruz, who was carrying a ceremonial baton; according to some accounts, he seized the baton, saying "You are a dog because you are carrying that bastón. Don't come here disturbing the people. If it was not for the day that this is, I would have given you a hundred lashes with a whipping stick."

Two months later, on November 21, foreman Juan de Figueroa arrived from Presidio San Ignacio de Tubac with news of the Pima Revolt, led by Oacpicagigua. The natives fled the mission, and Garrucho followed. He stopped at Mission Santa María Suamca, where he heard de la Cruz's confession, before taking refuge at San Felipe. He subsequently relocated to Mission San Miguel Arcángel de Oposura.

The revolt was suppressed; Oacpicagigua's peace conditions included a demand that Garrucho return the Pima servants he had taken with him to Oposura. In the subsequent Spanish investigation, Diego Ortiz Parrilla blamed the Jesuits, especially Garrucho and his foreman. Garrucho was accused of kidnapping Pima children and of beating natives without cause.

Jesuit Joseph de Utrera conducted an internal investigation, during which he questioned local gentes de razón, military figures, and natives, including the native governors of several missions. Ignacio, native governor of Guevavi, testified that Garrucho had slapped the natives and ordered them whipped, and that Ignacio's own father had died of lingering injuries after Garrucho beat him with a stick. Juanico, native governor of Mission San Ignacio de Sonoitac, testified that Garrucho had seized land belonging to him and a group of other Pima. Garrucho, in his own defense, argued that Oacpicagigua had begun fomenting rebellion well before any of the incidents involving Garrucho.

The investigations continued for eight years, but were ultimately inconclusive. On June 28, 1759, the Spanish government recommended that the case be closed. Elisabeth Farnese, on behalf of Charles III of Spain, signed a cédula closing it on September 27 of that year.

=== Later life ===
Garrucho remained at Oposura for fifteen years, during part of which time he served as Father Visitor of Sonora. By 1765, he had learned to speak Ópata, the local language. He gained a reputation among his Spanish peers for his pride and for the luxurious table he set.

In July 1767, Spanish soldiers arrived to carry out the orders of Charles III by expelling the Jesuits from Mexico. Along with about fifty other Jesuits Garrucho was escorted to a church in Mátape, near Hermosillo. From there, the soldiers took them to Guaymas, across the Gulf of Mexico, through Tepic, and to Guadalajara. Many of the Jesuits died on the way, but a few, including Garrucho, survived to reach Cádiz in Spain.

From Cádiz, most of the Jesuits were sent to a hospice in El Puerto de Santa María, but Garrucho was taken to Madrid and imprisoned there. He was later confined in a Hieronymite monastery; he remained even after the authorities told him he was free to go, and ultimately died there in 1785.
