= Jacobo Sedelmayr =

Bavarian Jesuit missionary (1702–1779)

Jacobo Sedelmayr (1702–1779) was a Jesuit missionary in New Spain, known for his explorations of the Pimería Alta.

== Biography ==
Sedelmayr was born in Bavaria in 1702, and entered the Society of Jesus in 1722. He embarked from El Puerto de Santa María for Mexico on November 22, 1735, along with more than forty other Jesuits. His ship, the Santa Rosa, ran aground off San Juan de Ulúa on February 18, 1736, and the group of Jesuits proceeded on land to Mexico City by way of Pueblo de Los Ángeles.

Sedelmayr arrived in the Pimería Alta in 1737. He was initially assigned to Mission San Pedro y San Pablo del Tubutama, and made his solemn vows in the Jesuit order on May 1, 1740, alongside Alexandro Rapicani. After the 1751 Pima Revolt, Sedelmayr was removed from the Pimería Alta as one of Luis Oacpicagigua's peace conditions. He served at Mission Los Santos Ángeles de Guevavi from 1752 to 1754, at Mission San Francisco de Huásaca until 1756, at Mission San Francisco de Borja de Tecoripa until 1763, and finally at Mission San José de Mátape.

Sedelmayr conducted extensive explorations of O'odham territory, making eight expeditions between 1737 and 1754. There he encountered the Maricopa and Halchidhoma, whom he hoped to bring into reductions. In his 1748 journey up the Colorado River, he reached its junction with Bill Williams River, despite encounters with unfriendly Yuma. He believed there were mercury deposits along the upper Colorado. Sedelmayr also explored the entire length of the Gila River, and advocated for expanding the Spanish missions all the way to its shores.

In 1767, all Jesuits were expelled from Mexico by order of Charles III of Spain. Along with many other Jesuits, Sedelmayr was taken to Spain, where he died at Aldeadávila de la Ribera in 1779.
