= Alejandro Romano (missionary) =

Italian Jesuit missionary (1664–1724)

Alejandro Romano (1664–1724) was a Jesuit missionary in New Spain.

== Biography ==
Romano was born in Naples in 1664, entered the Society of Jesus in 1680, and took his final vows in 1699. In 1700, Romano succeeded Juan de Ugarte as procurator of the Jesuit missions in New Spain. In 1719, he was promoted to provincial superior, an office he held until 1722.

Romano opposed the founding of the Convent of Corpus Christi in Mexico City for indigenous women. In a 1723 letter, he argued that native women were disinclined to live in community, had a short attention span, and were incapable of keeping a vow of chastity.

At the time of his death in 1724, Romano was serving as rector of the Casa Profesa.
