= Nicolás de Freitas =

Franciscan missionary (b. 1634)

Nicolás de Freitas (b. 1634) was a Franciscan missionary to New Spain.

== Biography ==
Freitas was born in Mexico City in 1634. His father, Juan de Freitas, was from the Canary Islands; his mother, Gerónima de Rueda, was native to the area. He entered the Franciscan order on June 4, 1650, and accompanied Governor Bernardo López de Mendizábal to New Mexico in December 1658. From 1659 to 1660, he served at Mission Nuestra Señora de la Purisima Concepción de Quarai.

In 1661, Freitas testified to the Holy Office in the Inquisition trial of López de Mendizábal. He recounted a conversation in which López had claimed that the bull Omnimoda had been revoked, limiting the powers of mendicant orders in the New World. He also accused López of allowing the local Hopi to perform their traditional Kachina dances.

Freitas subsequently accompanied López's replacement, Diego de Peñalosa, to Santa Fe, and became custos there. In 1706, Freitas testified to Governor Francisco Antonio Marín del Valle about the likely location of the body of another Franciscan, Geronimo de la Llana.
