= Hernando de Santarén =

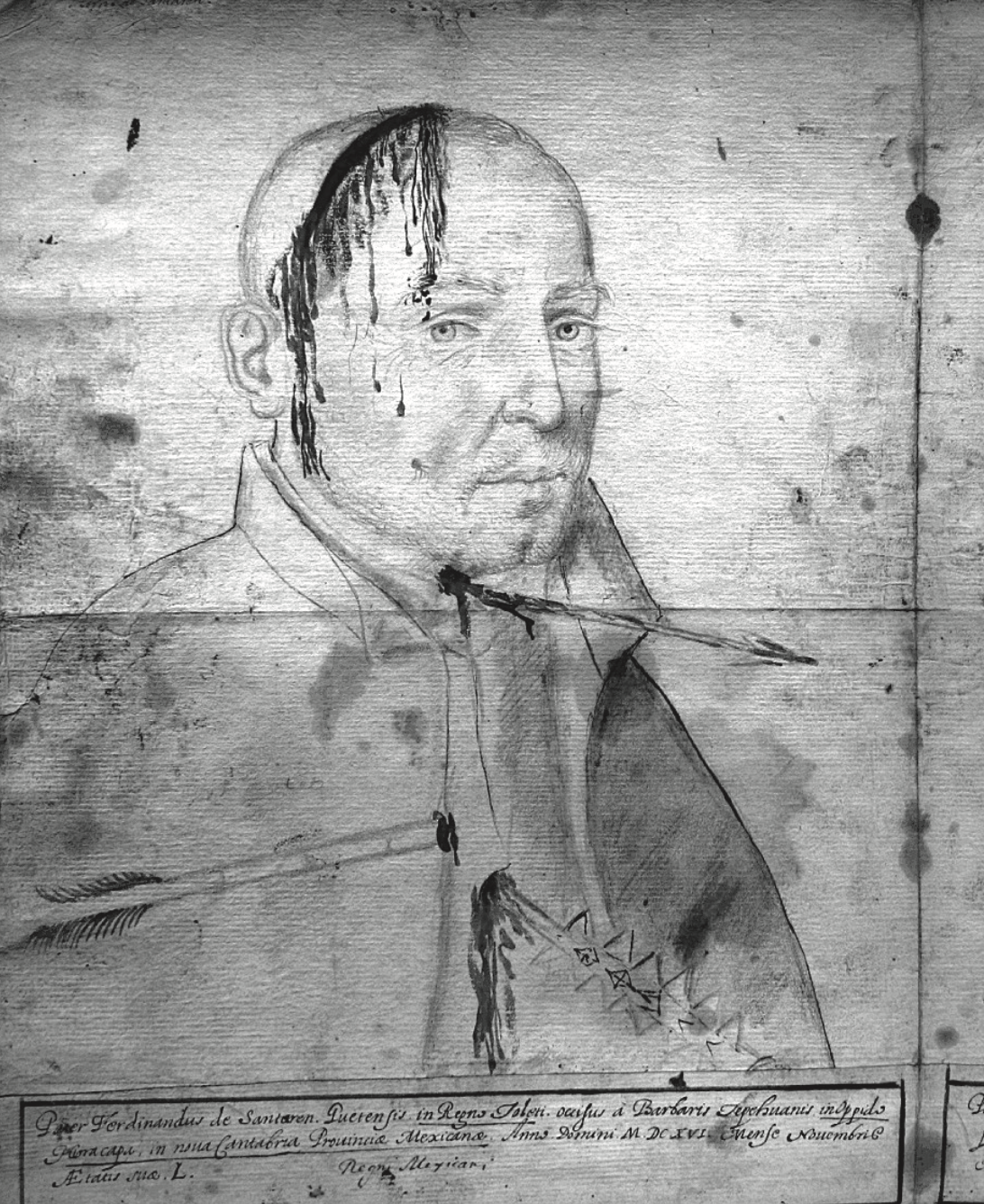
Contemporary Jesuit depiction of Santarén's martyrdom

Hernando de Santarén was a Jesuit missionary to New Spain.

== Biography ==
Santarén was born in Huete, Toledo. He entered the Society of Jesus at the age of fifteen. He traveled to Mexico from Spain in 1588, together with fellow Jesuit missionary Pedro de Hortigosa. After spending some time at Jesuit colleges, first as a student and then as a teacher, Santarén proceeded to Sinaloa along with fellow missionary Pedro Mendez. He spent some time en route at San Andrés de Nava, and arrived at his destination on June 29, 1594, immediately before the death of Gonzalo de Tapia.

Santarén was assigned to Mission San Pedro y Pablo de Guasave and Mission San Miguel de Ures from 1594 to 1597. In 1598, he was reassigned to Topia and founded the San Andrés mission there.

In 1600, with military support from the encomendero Diego de Avila, Santarén mounted a "pacification and conversion campaign" against the native Guazapare, Chínipa, Acaxee, and Tepehuán peoples. Avila forced natives in each town to kneel to Santarén or kiss his hand, and then watch while soldiers destroyed and burned their sacred objects and venerated bones. Afterwards, the natives were forcibly relocated to Jesuit reductions.

Santarén was killed in the 1616 Tepehuán Revolt, along with seven other Jesuits.
