= Antonio de Ibargaray =

Franciscan missionary

Antonio de Ibargaray (or Ybargaray) was a Franciscan missionary to New Spain.

== Biography ==
Ibargaray was born in Bilbao around the year 1602. He entered the Franciscan order on 17 January 1629, in the Convento Grande in Mexico City. On 20 January 1630, he made his solemn vows in the Convento de San Francisco in Puebla.

Over the course of more than thirty years, Ibargaray served as custos of a number of missions, including San Miguel (1635), Pecos (1636), Nambé (1662), and Galisteo (1663–1665). On 6 October 1653, he was elected as custodio, or head, of the Franciscan missions in New Mexico, a position he held until 1656. By 1668, Ibargaray was a definitor of the Franciscan order.

Governor Bernardo López de Mendizábal described Ibargaray as "very headstrong and uncontrolled". In November 1636, Ibargaray wrote a letter of complaint to the viceroy, Lope Díez de Armendáriz, about the governor, Francisco Martínez de Baeza. Between 1653 and 1656, Ibargaray clashed with governor Juan de Samaniego y Xaca, and on 6 March 1662, Ibargaray testified before the Inquisition against Teresa Aguilera y Roche, Mendizábal's wife. Ibargaray also likely served as commissary of the Inquisition.
