= Hernando de Cabrero =

Hernando de Cabrero was a Jesuit missionary in the Americas.

== Biography ==
Cabrero served for some time as a missionary in the New Kingdom of Granada. In a 1660 report, he described a man who refused to repent of "living in sin" being eaten by a caiman.

From 1661 to 1664, Cabrero was assigned as visitor general in New Spain. In consultation with the provincial superior, Pedro Antonio Díaz, he finalized a new code for the Jesuit missions in New Spain on September 20, 1662.

In 1676, Cabrero approved the foundation of the Jesuit Missions of Moxos.
