= Alexandro Rapicani =

18th century Jesuit missionary to New Spain

- Born: 3 November 1702; Zeven, Bremen-Verden
- Died: 3 September 1768 (aged 65); Ixtlan del Rio, Spain

Alexandro Rapicani (3 November 1702 – 3 September 1768) was a Jesuit missionary to New Spain.

== Biography ==
Rapicani was born on 3 November 1702, in Zeven, Bremen-Verden. After studying at a Jesuit college in Westphalia, he left for Spain on 14 April 1735, and embarked for the Americas from El Puerto de Santa María on 22 November of the same year. There were more than forty Jesuits aboard the ship with him, including Andrés Xavier García and Jacobo Sedelmayr. On 18 February 1736, they were shipwrecked on the island of San Juan de Ulúa; there were no casualties, and the Jesuits continued on to Mexico City.

On 1 June 1737, Rapicani was officially stationed at Mission Los Santos Ángeles de Guevavi. He took his final vows on 1 May 1740. Later that year, he was reassigned to Mission Nuestra Senora del Populo del Seri. There he came into conflict with Governor Agustín de Vildósola, who wished to buy wheat which Rapicani did not wish to sell.

Between 1744 and 1764, Rapicani commissioned the construction of a church at Mission San Francisco Javier de Batuc. He was a controversial figure at Batuc as well, and the local teniente político submitted complaints against him to Governor Juan Claudio de Pineda. The Jesuit Father Visitor, Manuel Aguirre, responded on 25 December 1764 by submitting a character reference for him, informing the governor that Rapicani's father had been the favorite of Christina of Sweden. The governor subsequently dismissed the case.

In July 1767, Spanish soldiers arrived to carry out the orders of Charles III by expelling the Jesuits from Mexico. Along with about fifty other Jesuits, Rapicani was escorted to a church in Mátape, near Hermosillo. From there, the soldiers took them to Guaymas, across the Gulf of California, through Tepic, and to Guadalajara. Like many of the Jesuits, Rapicani did not survive the journey; he died on 3 September 1768, in Ixtlán del Río.
