= Franz Hermann Glandorf =

Jesuit missionary in New Spain

Franz Hermann Glandorf was a Jesuit missionary to New Spain.

== Biography ==
Glandorf was born in Osnabrück, Germany on October 28, 1689. Upon arriving in Mexico, he spent some time at Mission Nombre de Jesús Carichí, where he learned the Tarahumara language from fellow Jesuit missionary Joseph Neumann. He was then assigned to Mission Purísima Concepción de Tomochi, where he served as a missionary to the Tarahumara for more than forty years.

Glandorf, who was afraid of horses and unable to ride due to a hernia, traveled through New Spain exclusively on foot. His shoes, along with his ossuary, have been preserved as relics by later Jesuits.
