= Nicolás Hidalgo =

Jesuit missionary accused of atrocities

Nicolás Hidalgo was a Jesuit missionary to New Spain, accused by natives of rape, murder, and violent abuse.

== Biography ==
In 1637 and 1638, natives from Taos Pueblo brought accusations against Hidalgo to the governor, Luis de Rosas. The secretary of state, Francisco de Anaya Almazán, took their sworn statements. The natives testified that Hidalgo used castration and sodomy as punishments, including twisting the penis of a native man, Pedro Acomilla, until it broke. They also described Hidalgo murdering two native men in order to gain sexual access to their wives, taking a native baby from its mother and throwing it into a fireplace, and raping and impregnating a number of native women.

Although de Rosas wrote to the Inquisition, which preserved a record of the statement, no official action was taken. In 1639, Hidalgo was reassigned to Sandia Pueblo. Historians including Zeb Tortorici and Jerry Craddock speculate that Hidalgo's behavior may have contributed to the 1639 revolt of Taos Pueblo.
