= Daniel Angelo Marras =

Sardinian Jesuit missionary

Daniel Angelo Marras was a Jesuit missionary in New Spain.

== Biographies ==
Marras was born in Cagliari, Sardinia.

In 1656, Marras was assigned to Mission San José de Mátape, where he founded a school for the religious education of native converts. Over the course of his tenure, Marras made Mátape into a commercial hotspot, and established cattle ranching in Sonora. Marras was also heavily involved in mining operations in Mátape, despite Jesuit rules forbidding such involvement. Under his management, two mines were established, manned by African slaves, and a refinery was founded to process the resulting ore.

As of 1685, Marras was vice provincial of the Jesuits in New Spain. He died in Mexico in 1689.
