= Cristóbal de Cañas =

Jesuit missionary in New Spain

Cristóbal de Cañas (1680 – 1740) was a Jesuit missionary in New Spain.

== Biography ==
Cañas was born in 1680 in Cádiz, Spain; entered the Society of Jesus on May 19, 1697; was ordained in 1706 in Oaxaca, Mexico; and served his tertianship in 1707. From 1710 to 1718, he taught philosophy at the College of Santa Cruz de Querétaro, taking his final vows on February 2, 1715.

In 1720, Cañas was assigned to Mission Nuestra Señora de la Asunción de Arizpe, and by 1722 he was Father Visitor of the Jesuits in Sonora. Other Jesuits frequently consulted Cañas as a legal expert. Cañas clashed with Captain Gregorio Álvarez Tuñón y Quirós for a decade leading up to the latter's death in 1728.

By 1730, Cañas was serving at Mission San Pedro Aconchi. There, he warned about curanderos, writing that "the devil talks to [them] in the form of a jaguar, puma, dog, or, most commonly, in the form of a snake." In 1735, he was appointed rector of the Jesuit College in Durango.

Accounts by Carlos de Roxas, another Jesuit missionary, describe Cañas as tormented by "unnatural" suffering under the spell of a shaman for the last two years of his life. Cañas died on May 9, 1740.
