= Juan Bautista Grazhoffer =

Jesuit missionary (1690–1733)

Juan Bautista Grazhoffer (1690–1733) was a Jesuit missionary to the Sonoran Desert. He served briefly at Mission Los Santos Ángeles de Guevavi before his death, possibly by poison.

== Biography ==
Grazhoffer was born in Bleiburg, Austria, on June 5, 1690, joined the Society of Jesus on October 27, 1710, and made his final vows in Chomutov, Bohemia on February 2, 1728. He left for the Americas on May 12, 1729, where he spent several months assisting Luis Maria Gallardi at Mission San Pedro y San Pablo del Tubutama.

Juan Bautista de Anza escorted Grazhoffer to Mission San Gabriel de Guevavi in May 1732. Grazhoffer renamed the mission to San Rafael de Guevavi. On July 31, Grazhoffer visited Mission San Ignacio de Cabórica to deliver a report on his mission's progress to Agustín de Campos.

Philipp Segesser arrived at Guevavi in the spring of 1733, and on May 1 he wrote to report that Grazhoffer was in serious condition. Grazhoffer died on May 26th; Segesser accused the natives of poisoning him, and reported that an elderly Pima man admitted to having done so.
