= Mission Los Santos Ángeles de Guevavi =

Historic mission ruins in Arizona

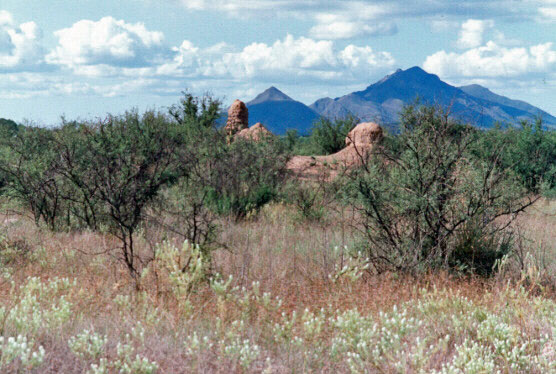
- The ruins of the mission church of Los Santos Ángeles de Guevavi beneath the backdrop of San Cayetano Mountain and the Sierra Santa Rita.
- Location: near Tumacácori, Arizona
- Name as founded: La Misión de San Gabriel de Guevavi
- English translation: The Mission of Saint Gabriel of the Big Spring
- Patron: Saint Gabriel
- Founded: 1701
- Founded by: Father Eusebio Francisco Kino; Father Salvatierra
- Native tribe: Pima; Tohono O'odham
- Governing body: National Park Service
- Current use: Historical Monument
- Guevavi Mission Ruins
- U.S. National Register of Historic Places
- U.S. National Historic Landmark
- Location within Arizona Location within the United States
- Location: Tumacácori National Historical Park, Santa Cruz County, Arizona
- Nearest city: Nogales, Arizona
- Coordinates: 31°24′35.67″N 110°54′9.68″W
- Built: 1751
- Architect: Joachin de Casares
- NRHP reference No.: 71000119

Significant dates
- Added to NRHP: November 5, 1971
- Designated NHL: June 21, 1990

La Misión de San Gabriel de Guevavi was founded by Jesuit missionary priests Eusebio Kino and Juan María de Salvatierra in 1691. Subsequent missionaries called it San Rafael and San Miguel, resulting in the common historical name of Mission Los Santos Ángeles de Guevavi (O'odham: Geʼe Wawhia Big Well/Spring).

Located in what is now Arizona, near Tumacácori, the mission served as a district headquarters for the Jesuits.

== History ==
The mission location was originally a native Sobaipuri or O'odham (Upper Pima) settlement, which Eusebio Kino visited in 1690. The mission was established in 1691, with Juan de San Martín as resident priest. By the late 1690s, the mission consisted of a church, a carpentry shop, and a blacksmith's area.

Under Jesuit supervision, Pima laborers built a small chapel in 1701, using adobe bricks and basic tools. Guevavi was designated as cabecera (headquarters) that same year.

Juan de San Martín left the mission in 1701, leaving it to be administered remotely by Agustín de Campos, Ignacio Xavier Keller, and Luis Xavier Velarde. A new priest, Juan Bautista Grazhoffer, was not assigned to the mission until 1732. Grazhoffer changed the mission name to San Rafael; another priest changed it to San Miguel in 1744.

In 1751, Joseph Garrucho contracted Joaquín de Casares of Arizpe to direct Pima laborers in building a new and larger 15-foot by 50-foot church, the ruins of which still exist today. The mother of Juan Bautista de Anza is buried in front of the altar. The church was damaged in the Pima Revolt, and renovated in 1754 under the supervision of Francisco Xavier Pauer.

As of 1767, the mission had three asistencias: Mission San Ignacio de Sonoitac, Mission San José de Tumacácori, and Mission San Cayetano de Calabazas. At some times, it also had Mission San Luís Baconacos as an asistencia.

The first Franciscan priest, Juan Crisóstomo Gil de Bernabé, arrived in 1768 and took up residency at the mission with about fifty families. The Apaches attacked in 1769 and killed all but two of the few Spanish soldiers guarding the mission; in 1770 and 1771 the natives continued their attacks and the cabecera was relocated to Tumacácori. Mission Los Santos Ángeles de Guevavi was abandoned for the last time by 1776.

== Missionaries ==
- 1691–1701: Juan de San Martín
- 1701–1732: no resident priest
- 1732–1733: Juan Bautista Grazhoffer
- 1734: Philipp Segesser
- 1734–1737: no resident priest
- 1737–1740: Alexandro Rapicani
- 1740–1744: Joseph de Torres Perea
- 1744–1745: Ildefonso de la Peña
- 1745–1751: Joseph Garrucho
- 1751–1760: Francisco Xavier Pauer
- 1760–1768: no resident priest
- 1768–1771: Juan Crisóstomo Gil de Bernabé

== Archaeology ==
The convento and church have been excavated by the Arizona Archaeological and Historical Society and the National Park Service. Historian John Kessell has written a comprehensive history of Guevavi. Archaeologist Deni Seymour has excavated a portion of the indigenous Sobaipuri-O'odham settlement of Guevavi and Father Kino's "neat little house and church."

=== Tumacácori National Historical Park ===
The Mission's ruins were incorporated into Tumacácori National Historical Park in 1990. It was declared a National Historic Landmark in 1990.,

=== Juan Bautista de Anza National Historic Trail ===
The Mission Los Santos Ángeles de Guevavi is a designated site of the Juan Bautista de Anza National Historic Trail, a National Park Service area in the United States National Trails System.

== See also ==
- List of Jesuit sites
- List of National Historic Landmarks in Arizona
- National Register of Historic Places listings in Santa Cruz County, Arizona
- Spanish Missions in the Sonoran Desert
