= Congosto =

- Municipality
- Coat of arms

- Location within Spain Location within Castile and León
- Coordinates: 42°37′4″N 6°31′12″W
- Country: Spain
- Autonomous community: Castile and León
- Province: León
- Comarca: El Bierzo
- Municipality: Congosto

Government
  - Mayor: José Antonio Velasco Fernández (PP)

Area
  - Total: 36.81 km^{2} (14.21 sq mi)
- Elevation: 689 m (2,260 ft)

Population (2023)
  - Total: 1,436
  - Density: 39.01/km^{2} (101.0/sq mi)
- Demonym(s): congostino, congostina
- Time zone: UTC+1 (CET)
  - Summer (DST): UTC+2 (CEST)
- Postal Code: 24398
- Telephone prefix: 987
- Climate: Csb

Congosto (Spanish pronunciation: [koŋˈɡosto]) is a village and municipality located in the comarca of El Bierzo (the province of León, Castile and León, Spain). The village of Congosto within the municipality has about 254 inhabitants.

Its economy was traditionally based on agriculture, wine and coal mining. Nowadays, most of the inhabitants work on the surrounding area on activities such as wind turbine manufacturing or coal mining.

Congosto also has a large reservoir in its vicinity, the Barcena reservoir, to which many tourists visit during the summer.

== Born in Congosto ==
- Alonso de Posada, (1626–?), Franciscan missionary in New Mexico
- Álvaro de Mendaña de Neira (1542–1595), navigator
