= Mission San Pedro y San Pablo del Tubutama =

Spanish mission of the Sonoran Desert

Coordinates: 30°53′6″N 111°27′55.5″W

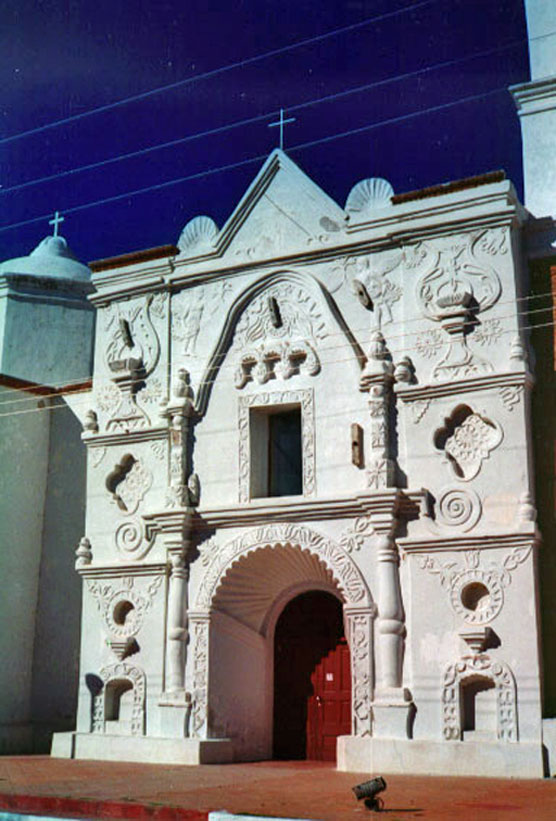
- The chapel of Mission San Pedro y San Pablo del Tubutama.
- Location: Tubutama, Sonora, Mexico
- Name as founded: La Misión de San Pedro y San Pablo del Tubutama
- English translation: The Mission of Saint Peter and Saint Paul of the Tubutama
- Patron: The Apostles Saint Peter and Saint Paul
- Founded: 1691
- Founded by: Eusebio Francisco Kino

Mission San Pedro y San Pablo del Tubutama is a Spanish mission located in Tubutama, Sonora, first founded in 1691 by Eusebio Francisco Kino.

== History ==
The mission was founded in 1691 by Eusebio Francisco Kino. It served as a headquarters for the local Jesuit missions; its visitas were Mission Santa Teresa de Atil and Mission San Antonio de Oquitoa.

The original mission complex was destroyed in 1695 in the Pima Revolt. The missionary then in residence, Daniel Januske, was absent during the attack. The church was rebuilt in 1699, and again in 1706. It was destroyed again in 1751 in the second Pima Revolt, while under the supervision of Jacobo Sedelmayr. His successor, Luis Vivas, saw it rebuilt by 1764.

Antonio de los Reyes on 6 July 1772 submitted a report on the condition of the missions in the Upper and Lower Pimería Alta. This was his report on Tubutama as translated by Kieran McCarty:

The Mission at Tubutama, with one outlying mission station, lies eight leagues to the west and a little to the north of the Mission of Sáric. To the south lies the uninhabited land of Lower Pimeria and to the north are the Papagos and the other pagan nations up to the Colorado and Gila Rivers, some seventy leagues distance from this Mission.

The village at Tubutama is situated on a broad lowland of good and fertile fields where few Indians cultivate their individual fields and communally plant wheat, Indian corn, beans and other crops. The house of the Father Missionary is decent and roomy with an adjoining garden of quinces, pomegranates, peaches, and other trees. The church is interiorly adorned with two altars, paintings in gilded frames, and a small side chapel. In the sacristy are three chalices, a pyx, a ceremonial cross, ceremonial candle-holders, censer, three dishes and cruets, all of silver, vestments of every kind and color and other interesting adornments for the altar and divine services. According to the Census Book, which I have here before me, there are forty-five married couples, twelve widowers, six widows, eighteen orphans, the number of souls in all one hundred seventy-six.

Felipe Guillén served as resident missionary from 1774 until he was killed by Apache raiders in 1778. Francisco Antonio Barbastro oversaw yet another rebuilding in the 1780s.

The arched entrance reflects the Mudéjar style of Islamic architecture; however, the interior transept is dedicated to the Passion of Christ, and the altarpiece has sculptured instruments of the Passion: crown of thorns, scourge, nails, tongs, ladder, and lances. A sculptured serpent crawls beneath an upper niche in the same altarpiece. This recess now holds a carved statue replicating Sanctuary of Arantzazu, an image of the Blessed Virgin Mary at Arantzazu in the Basque Country (autonomous community) of northern Spain.

== Missionaries ==
Missionaries stationed at Tubutama included:

- Antonio Arras (1691–?)
- Daniel Januske (?–1695)
- Ignacio Yturmendi (1701–1702)
- Jerónimo Minutuli (1703–?)
- Luís Gallardi (1727–1736)
- Jacobo Sedelmayr (1737–1751)
- Luis Vivas (1753–1767)
- Mariano Antonio de Buena y Alcalde (1768–?)
- José del Río (?–1769)
- Esteban Salazar (?–1772)
- José María Espinosa (1773–1774)
- Felipe Guillén (1774–1778)
- Manuel Carrasco (1776)
- Francisco Antonio Barbastro (1776; 1778–1783)
- Félix Gamarra (1779)
- Francisco Iturralde (1784; 1792–1799)
- Francisco Moyano (1788–1796)
- Bartolomé Socies (1791)
- Narciso Gutiérrez (1796–1797)
- José Gómez (1800–?)
- Miguel Montes (1813)

== See also ==
- List of Jesuit sites
- Spanish Missions in the Sonoran Desert
