= Luis Xavier Velarde =

Jesuit missionary to Mexico (1677–1737)

Luis Xavier Velarde (1677–1737) was a Jesuit missionary to Mexico.

== Biography ==
Velarde was born in Valladolid, Spain on August 25, 1677, and entered the Society of Jesus on April 20, 1697. Around 1703, he traveled to Pimería Alta to begin missionary work. By 1708, Velarde was serving at Mission La Purísima Concepción de Caborca. Velarde became the resident priest at Mission Nuestra Señora de Dolores de la Punta in 1714, and took his final vows in Opodepe on March 25, 1715.

Anthropologist Thomas Sheridan describes Velarde as "tall, deaf, and prone to heat stroke ... not much of an explorer."

In 1716, Velarde wrote a relacion about his experiences with the Upper Pima. He described their practice of raising scarlet macaws:

There are also birds of almost every kind or species as in the rest of New Spain. At San Xavier del Bac and neighboring rancherías there are many macaws that the Pimas raise for their beautiful red feathers — and other colors, similar to those of the peacock — which they pluck during the spring for their adornment.

Velarde wrote that between 1725 and 1729,

57 marriages have been celebrated in facie ecclesiae for the natives from the villages of Santa María and Guevavi and their adjacent rancherías. From the same villages and rancherías and others farther into the interior whose people frequent our villages from the end of November until the end of January, 276 children have been baptized, most of whom have died of measles, but with the grace of baptism.

Velarde died on December 2, 1737.
