= Alonso de Posada =

Spanish Franciscan missionary

- Custos of New Mexico
- Church: Catholic Church
- Previous post: New Mexico

Personal details
- Born: 1626 Congosto, Spain
- Died: Unknown Mexico City

Alonso de Llanos y Posada González (1626–?) was a Franciscan missionary who worked among the Puebloans and the Hopi Indians in northern New Spain (present-day New Mexico and Arizona). He became the Custos (leader) of the Franciscans in New Mexico. Posada suppressed the indigenous religious practices of the Hopi and Puebloans. Posada was often in conflict with the secular government of New Mexico. He was the Franciscan leader in disputes with two New Mexican governors, Bernardo López de Mendizábal and Diego de Peñalosa, which led to their dismissal and prosecution. In the 17th century, the secular authorities and the Franciscan missionaries in New Mexico were often in conflict as they competed for power, wealth, and the resources and labor of the Indians. Historian John L. Kessell said, "No friar ever wielded the authority of the Inquisition in New Mexico" that Posada did.

== Early life ==
Posada was born in 1626 in Congosto, León, Spain to Alonso de Llanos y Posada and Maria Gonzalez. He was ordained as a Franciscan priest on October 20, 1646, in Mexico. Posada was assigned to the Franciscan missions in New Mexico, arriving there in 1651.

== Missionary to the Hopi and the Puebloans ==
From 1653 to 1656, Posada was stationed at the isolated Hopi pueblo of Awatovi, more than 200 miles (320 km) west of the principal Spanish settlements in the Rio Grande valley of New Mexico. In the words of historian France V. Scholes, "the [16]50's were characterized by an increasing restlessness among the Pueblos and a growing hostility on the part of the Apache tribes." The Spanish, including the Franciscan missionaries, required tribute and labor from the Indians and attempted to destroy their customs and religions in order to impose Christianity. Two incidents among the Hopi while Posada was there illustrate the tension between the Hopi and the missionaries.

=== The Guerra affair ===
In 1655, Hopi leaders accused missionary Salvador de Guerra of brutally beating and torturing a Hopi man who died soon thereafter. Guerra was tried by the Franciscans and sentenced to be confined to a convent and denied his rights to perform religious services. Guerra reappeared in 1661 as the notary and close associate of Posada when Posada took leadership (commissary) as the highest ranking Franciscan in New Mexico.

=== Mocking Posada ===
In 1656, while Posada was absent from Awatovi, a young man named Juan Suñi entered the church, donned the priestly vestments, and mocked the priest and the Catholic ceremony. On his return, Posada had Suñi arrested and sent him to Santa Fe to be confined by the Franciscans and to work as a servant. Three years later Suñi was tried for an incident of petty thievery in the home of the Governor of New Mexico, sentenced to 200 lashes, and sold to the highest bidder for 10 years of enslavement. A scholar said that the incident "reflect(s) broad-based tensions between Hopis and Spaniards that are often underplayed in the literature on that period."

== Posada versus the governors ==
Posada was in Mexico City from 1659 to 1661. On May 22, 1661, shortly after his return to New Mexico, as the head ("Custos") of the Franciscans in New Mexico and an agent of the Inquisition, he overturned many of Governor Bernardo López de Mendizábal actions tolerating Pueblo Indian religious practices. He ordered Kachina dances prohibited and the Franciscan missionaries to seize and burn religious objects of the Puebloans. When a new governor, Diego de Peñalosa, arrived later that year Posada was initially cooperative with him. However, in 1662 Posada ordered local officials to turn over some tax revenues to the Franciscans rather than remit them to the governor and their relationship became toxic. In early 1663, Posada moved from Santa Fe to the mission in Pecos to avoid contact with Peñalosa. In August, Peñalosa ordered a criminal suspect forcibly removed from sanctuary in a church and arrested. Posada did not tolerate this violation of the right of asylum in a church and excommunicated the governor.

On September 30, 1663, an armed Peñalosa and several of his followers arrested Posada at his church in Pecos and imprisoned him in Santa Fe. A stand-off between secular and religious authorities ensued until Posada backed off and agreed to withdraw the excommunication of Peñalosa, but Posada built a bill of particulars against the governor that led to his prosecution. Peñalosa fled New Mexico in March 1664. He was later tried and convicted in Mexico City. The sentence was banishment from New Spain and the West Indies, a public auto de fe, and exclusion from any future public office.

== Later life ==
Posada returned to Mexico City in autumn 1665, his time in New Mexico at an end. He held high office among the Franciscans in Mexico until at least 1686 when he wrote a report to the Spanish king about the geography and ethnography of the American southwest.
