= Philipp Segesser =

Swiss missionary (1689–1762)

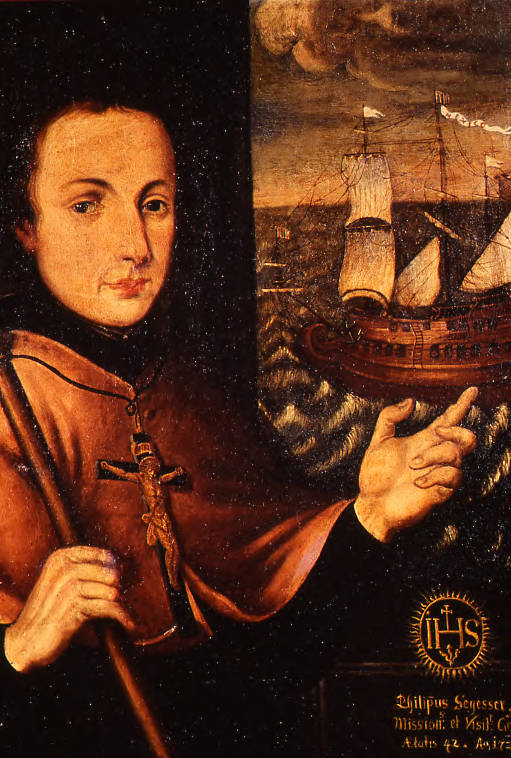
- Segesser in 1729
- Born: Philipp Anton Segesser von Brunegg; 1 September 1689; Lucerne, Switzerland
- Died: 28 September 1762 (aged 73); Ures, Sonora
- Occupation: Missionary
- Known for: Descriptions of Sonora Indians

Philipp Segesser (1 September 1689 – 28 September 1762) was a German-speaking Swiss Jesuit missionary who spent much of his career in Sonora, Mexico.

== Early years ==
Philipp Anton Segesser von Brunegg was born on 1 September 1689 in Lucerne, Switzerland. He attended the Jesuit College in Lucerne. On 15 October 1708 he ended his academic education, and probably moved to the Jesuit school in Landsberg am Lech for his novitiate. He took his four vows as a Jesuit missionary in 1710. He worked as a teacher in the Jesuit province of Upper Germany. In 1717 he moved to the Jesuit College of Ingolstadt for continued theological studies and was officially accepted into the Society of Jesus.

== Jesuit teacher ==
Segesser completed his studies in 1721, and celebrated his first mass as a priest on 8 June 1721. He became a teacher at Altötting on 16 September 1721, and in 1722 was transferred to a teaching post in Straubing. In 1726 he took his final vows in Neuburg an der Donau, making a lifetime commitment to the Jesuits. In 1727 he became a missionary near Dillingen. After the death of Eusebio Kino in 1711 a growing number of German-speaking Jesuit missionaries were sent to the Sonora region. Segesser learned in April 1729 that he had been accepted for a mission in New Spain. After a long and difficult journey with several lengthy delays, traveling via Genoa, Cádiz, Seville, Santo Domingo and Havana, he finally reached Veracruz on 19 April 1731. He traveled north, reached Sonora early in October and on 7–8 May 1732 reached the final destination of the Mission San Xavier del Bac in present-day Arizona.

== New Spain ==
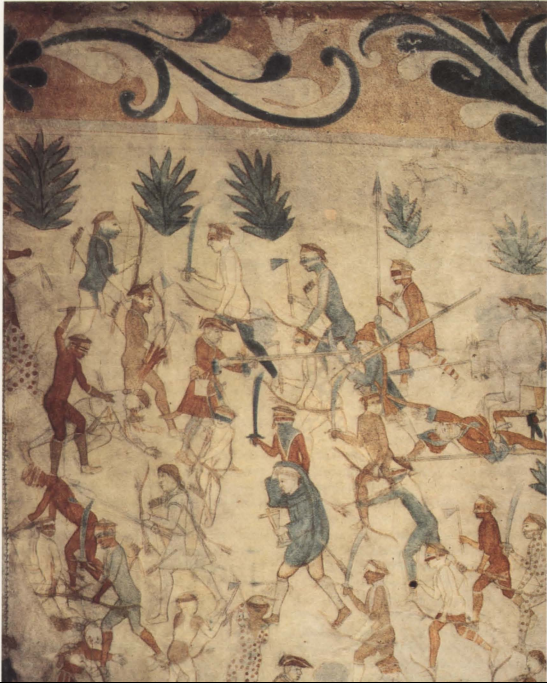
Detail of one of the hide paintings to Segesser sent to Switzerland in 1758

Segesser spent nearly thirty years as a missionary in different parts of the Pimería Alta. Segesser and his fellow missionaries had to overcome what the Jesuits saw as barbaric practices. They also had to deal with the severe climate, where drought destroyed their plantations in some years, and in another year flooding from the Yaqui River destroyed entire mission villages. In 1734 he moved from the Mission Los Santos Ángeles de Guevavi to Cucurpe to recover from an illness. He was in San Francisco de Borja de Tecoripa in 1737, and for several periods in the years that followed was the rector of the Jesuit school there. From 1750 to 1754 he was visitator of Sonora. In 1755 he became missionary superior. He died on 28 September 1762 in Ures at a time when his mission was suffering severe damage from attacks by Apaches and Seris.

Segesser was hard-working, practical and effective. He wrote many letters that described his daily life and the geography, fauna and flora of Sonora. They give valuable information about the local people and their lifestyle, including their beliefs, culture and way of life. Segesser's letters also requested seeds for crops like flax, beets, cauliflower, fennel, garlic, and celery. Mission Garden (Tucson) has a Spanish Colonial garden that grows crops based in part on these letters. In 1758 Segesser sent his brother in Switzerland "three colored skins", or hide paintings. They depict Spaniards, Frenchmen, Oto, Pawnee, Apache and Pueblo Indians. They provide important information on the dress and weapons of Plains Indian fighters.

The paintings appear to depict the 1720 battle near the Loup River between the Villasur expedition and a force of Pawnees and Otoes. Segesser gave no indication of how he had acquired the paintings or of their significance, simply calling them "curiosities". Over the years the buffalo hide paintings were moved from one Swiss castle to another, and were cut so they could fit the available space. By 1988 the connection to the battle was posited, and the hides moved to the Museum of New Mexico in Santa Fe, New Mexico (the town from which Tomas Jiron de Tejeda, Fray Angelico Chavez's favoured candidate as to the artist, had a base of production).
