= Corpus Christi Church, Mexico City =

Coordinates: 19.434391°N 99.143726°W

Corpus Christi Church
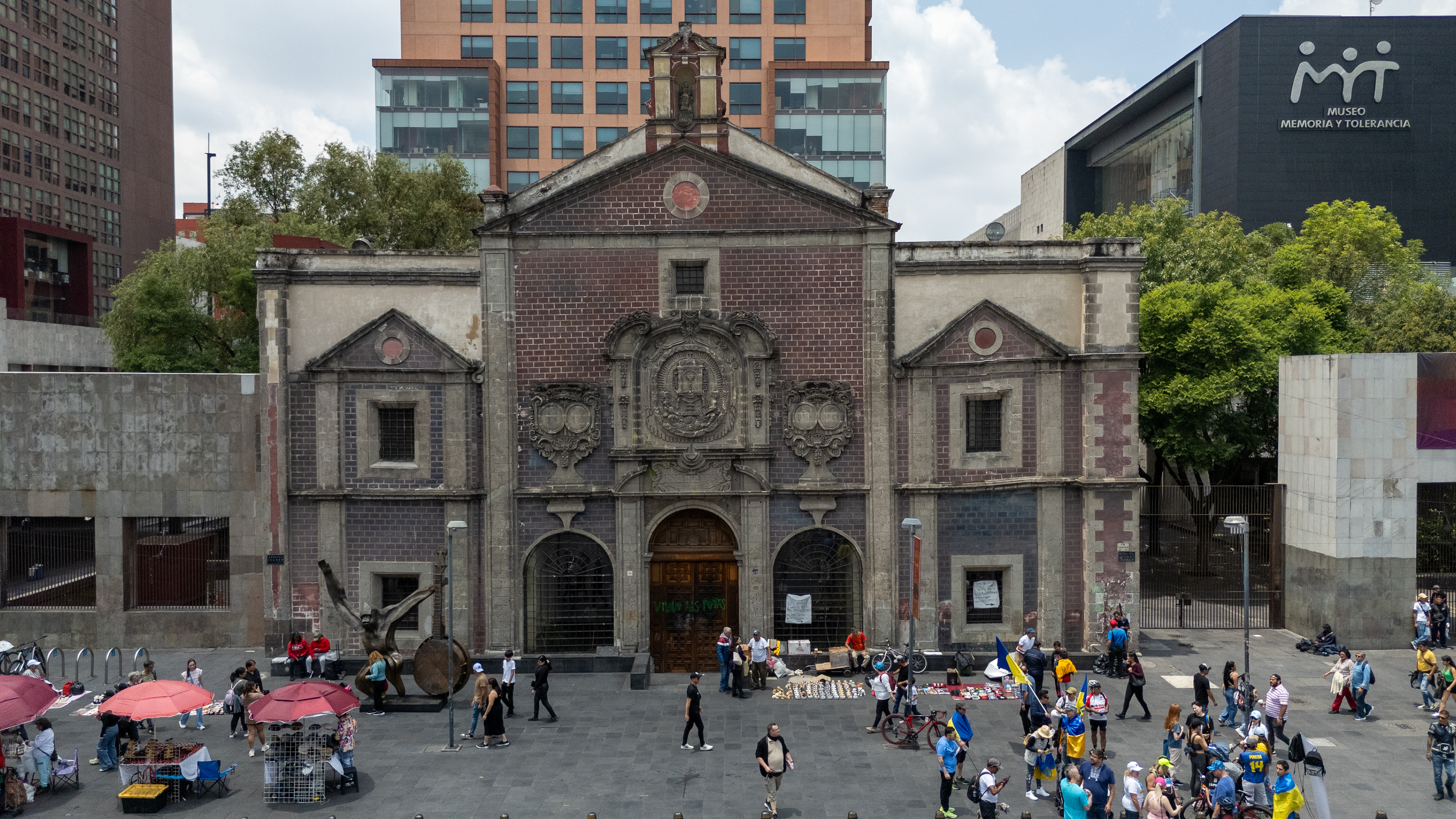
- The church's exterior in 2025
- Corpus Christi Church
- Country: Mexico
- Denomination: Catholic

History
- Founded: 1724

The Corpus Christi Church is a former church on Avenida Juárez in the Historic center of Mexico City. It is the only remaining part of the Convent of Corpus Christi, founded in 1724 for indigenous women and which was closed as part of the Reform Laws. The architect of the baroque structure was Pedro de Arrieta who also designed the Palace of the Inquisition and the Church of San Felipe Neri "La Profesa".

The church was damaged during the 1985 earthquake and it was restored.

== See also ==
- List of colonial churches in Mexico City
- Catholic Church in Mexico
