= Spanish missions in Mexico =

Catholic religious outposts

The Spanish missions in Mexico are a series of religious outposts established by Spanish Catholic Franciscans, Jesuits, Augustinians, and Dominicans to spread the Christian doctrine among the local natives. Since 1493, the Kingdom of Spain had maintained a number of missions throughout Nueva España (New Spain, consisting of what is today Mexico, the Southwestern United States, the Florida and the Luisiana, Central America, the Spanish Caribbean and the Philippines) in order to preach the gospel to these lands. In 1533, at the request of Hernán Cortés, Carlos V sent the first Franciscan friars with orders to establish a series of installations throughout the country.

== Missions ==
Mapa del Virreinato de la Nueva España (1819)

=== Coahuila ===
- Mission San Francisco Solano
- Mission San Juan Bautista
- Mission Dulce Nombre de Jesus de Peyotes in Villa Union
- Mission San Andrés de Nava
- Mission San Buenaventura de la Consolación
- Mission Nuestra Señora de Dolores de la Punta in Lampazos
- Mission San Bernardino de la Candela
- Mission San Buenaventura in Cuatrocienegas
- Mission Santa Rosa de Nadadores
- Mission San Francisco de Saltillo
- Mission San Miguel de Aguayo in Monclova

=== Nueva Vizcaya ===
Topia, the western province of Nueva Vizcaya, contained three major missions: Xiximes, San Andrés, and Santa Cruz de Topia. These were each subdivided into several districts, or partidos, each of which in turn contained several pueblos, or visitas.

==== Xiximes ====
First district:

- San Pablo Hetasi
- San Pedro de Guarizame
- Santa Lucia

Second district:

- Santa Cruz de Yamoriba
- San Bartolomé de Humase

Third district:

- Santa Apolonia
- Concepcion
- Santiago el Nuevo

Fourth district:

- San Ignacio
- San Gerónimo Adia (or Ahoya)
- San Juan
- San Francisco Cababayan (or Cabazan)
- San Agustin

==== San Andrés ====
First district:

- San Ignacio de Otatitlán
- Piaba
- Alaya
- Quejupa

Second district:

- San Ildefonso de los Remedios
- Santa Catalina

Third district:

- San Gregorio
- Sojbupa
- San Pedro
- San Mateo de Tecayas

Fourth district:

- Santa María de Otáez
- Santiago Batzotzi

==== Santa Cruz de Topia ====
First district:

- San Juan de Badiraguato
- Reyes de Conimeto
- Santa Cruz
- San Francisco Alicamae

Second district:

- San Martin Atotonilco
- Santiago Merirato
- San Ignacio Coriatapa
- San Pedro Guatenipa
- San Ignacio Bamupa
- San Luis Soyatlán
- Nabogame (or Saboguame)

Third district:

- San Ignacio de Tamazula
- San Martin Atotonilco
- San Ignacio Atotonilco
- San Joaquin Chapotlan
- San José Canelas

Parras, the eastern province of Nueva Vizcaya, contained six major missions with their visitas, as follows.

==== Santa María de Parras ====
- el Pozo
- La Peña
- Santa Barbara

==== San Pedro y San Pablo de Laguna ====
- Concepcion

==== San Lorenzo ====
- Horno
- Santa Ana

==== San Sebastian ====
- San Geronimo

==== San Ignacio ====
- San Juan de Casta

==== Santiago ====
- San José de las Abas
- Baicuco

Mission San Pablo Tepehuanes had the following partidos and visitas:

First district:

- Santiago Papasquiaro
- San Andrés Atotonilco
- San Nicolás

Second district:

- Santa Catalina
- Tepehuanes presidio

Third district:

- San Ignacio del Zape
- San Simon

Fourth district:

- San José Tizonazo
- Santa Cruz

Other missions in Nueva Vizcaya included:

- Mission San Jeronimo, in Aldama
- Mission Santa Rosalía in Camargo
- Mission San Francisco de Conchos
- Mission San Ignacio de Cariatapa
- Mission San Gregorio de la Sierra

=== Sonora y Sinaloa ===
- Mission La Purísima Concepción de Caborca
- Mission San Antonio de Oquitoa
- Mission San Diagos de Pitiquito
- Mission San Ignacio de Cabórica
- Mission San Pedro y San Pablo del Tubutama
- Mission Santa María Magdalena
- Mission Santa Teresa de Atil
- Mission Santiago y Nuestra Señora del Pilar de Cocóspera
- Mission San Miguel de Ures

=== Other ===
- Franciscan Missions in the Sierra Gorda of Querétaro
- Monasteries on the slopes of Popocatépetl
- Mendicant monasteries in Mexico
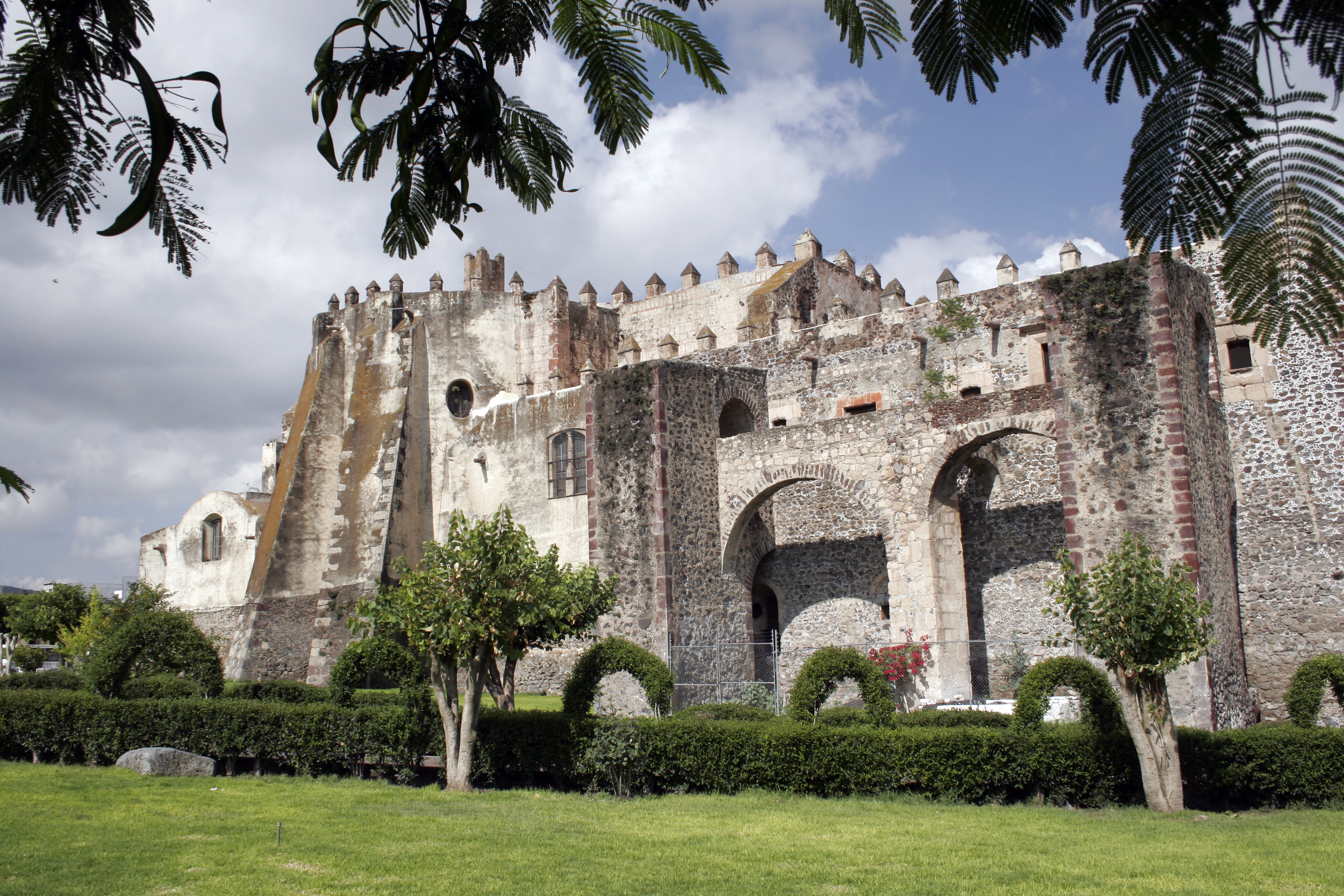
Convento de San Agustín de Yuriria.

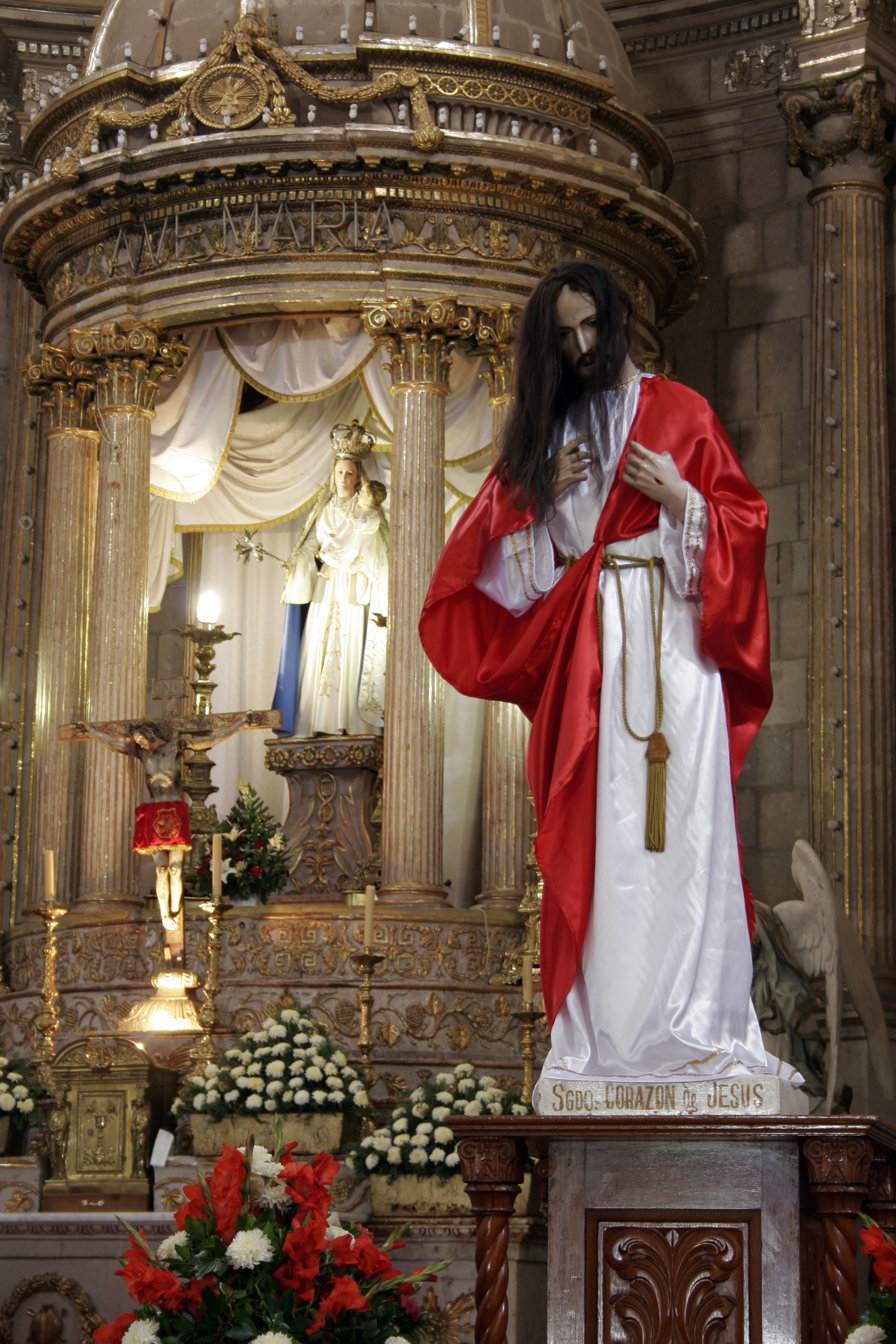
Detail of the Temple of the Convent of San Agustín de Yuriria.

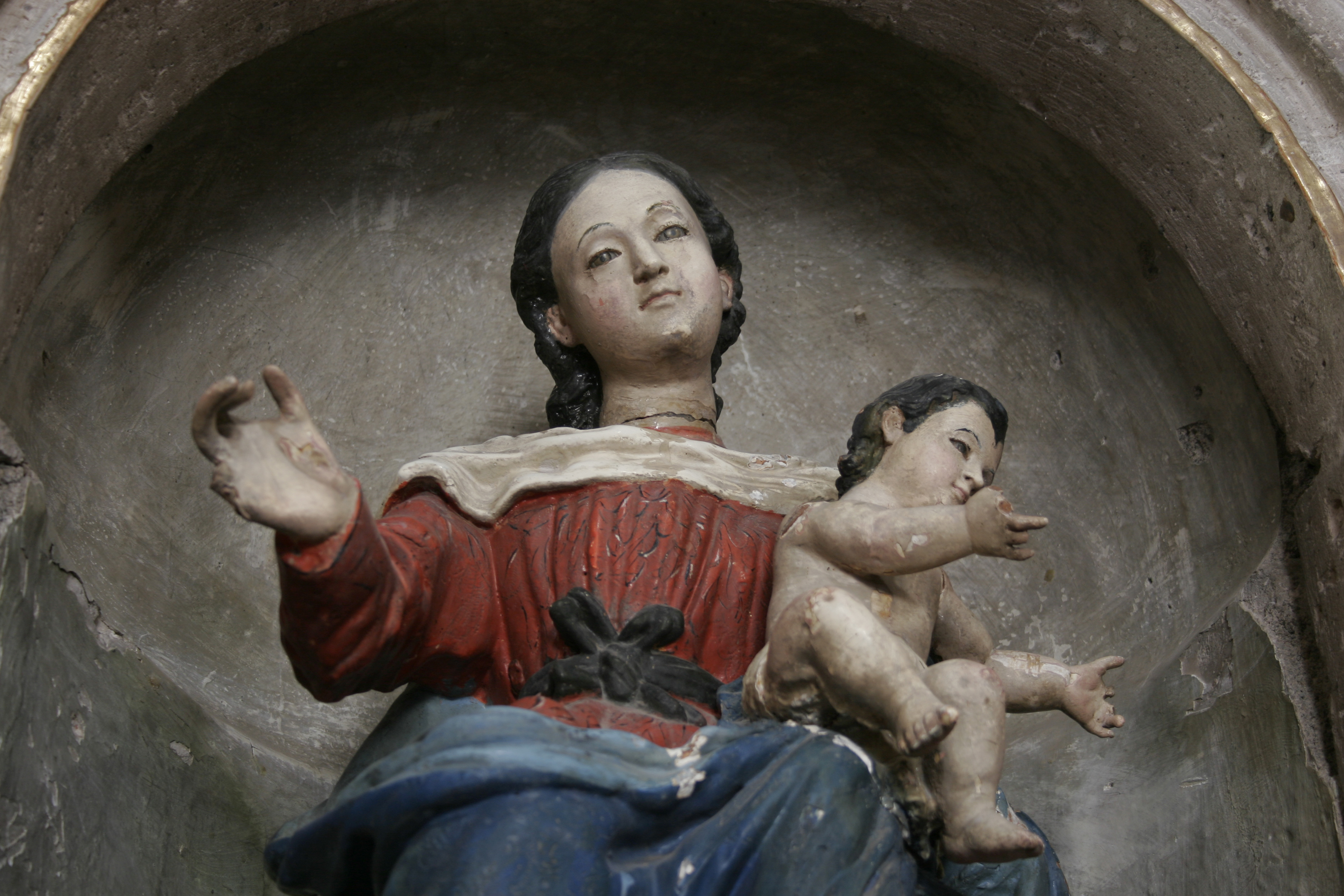
Detail of the Temple of the Convent of San Agustín de Yuriria.

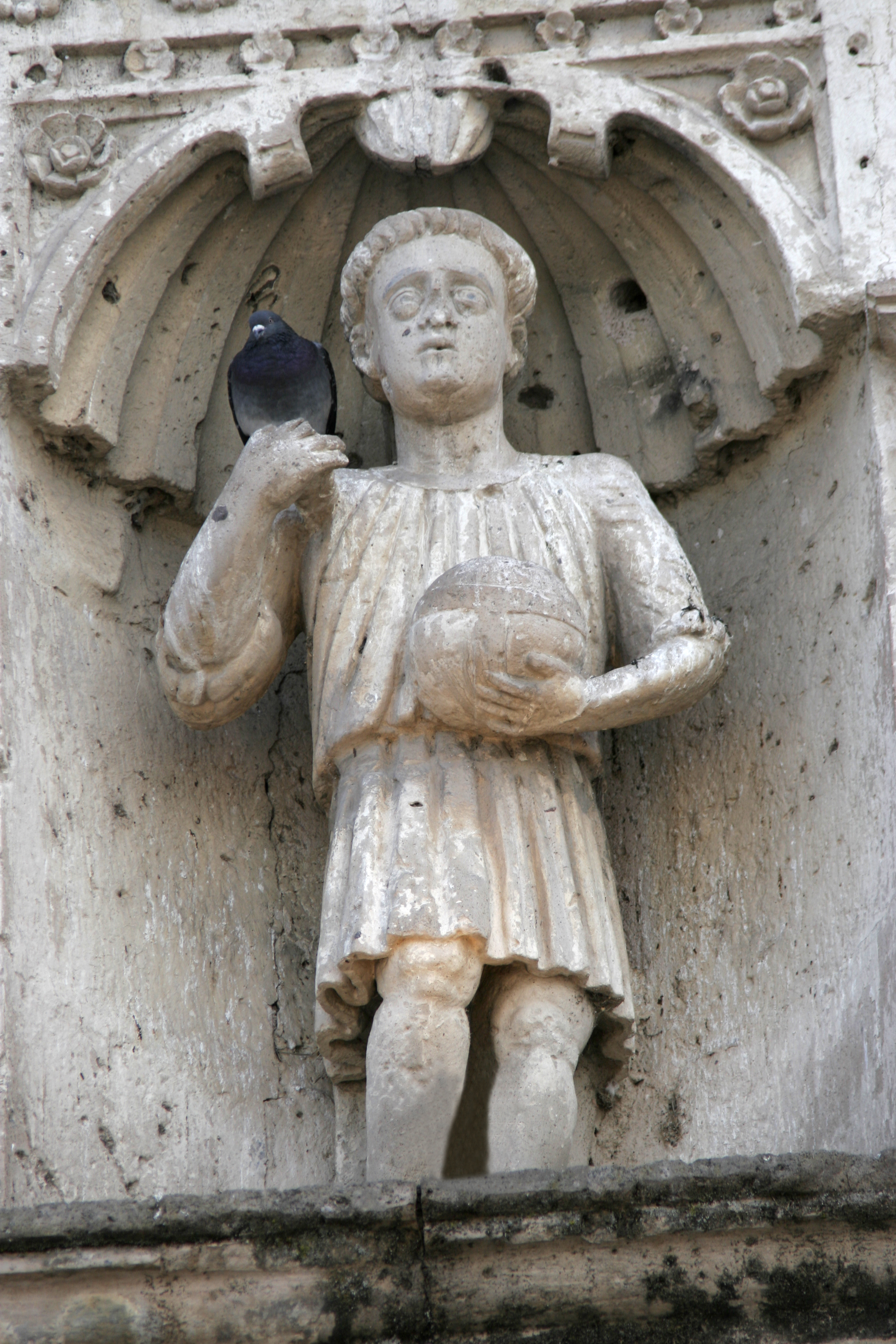
Detail of the Temple of the Convent of San Agustín de Yuriria.

== See also ==
- Jesuit Asia missions
- Jesuit Reductions
- List of the oldest churches in Mexico
- Reductions
- Supply of Franciscan missions in New Mexico
