= Luis Oacpicagigua =

Luis Oacpicagigua (O'odham: Brain Splicer) or Luis of Sáric (died 1755) was a Pima (Akimel O'odham) leader in the Spanish province of Sáric, now the far north of the Mexican state of Sonora.

== Biography ==
Oacpicagigua commanded a force of hundreds of O'odham warriors, which he led on a number of campaigns against the Apache. In 1750, Oacpicagigua and his company assisted Diego Ortiz Parrilla in capturing Tiburón Island from the native Seri people. Afterwards, Parrilla appointed Oacpicagigua provincial governor of the O'odham. The local Jesuit missionaries resented this, considering the appointment of native officials their own prerogative.

In 1751, Oacpicagigua led the Pima Revolt against the Spanish. The revolt failed in 1752, Oacpicagigua and his lieutenant Luis of Pitic were summoned for questioning and subsequently arrested, and Oacpicagigua died in Horcasitas jail in 1755.

Oacpicagigua's two sons, Ciprián and Nicolás, continued to lead revolts after their father's death.
