= Bernardo López de Mendizábal =

Colonial governor of Santa Fe de New Mexico

18th Spanish Governor of New Mexico
- In office 1659–1660
- Preceded by: Juan Manso de Contreras
- Succeeded by: Diego de Peñalosa

Personal details
- Born: 1620 Chietla, Viceroyalty of New Spain (now Puebla, Mexico)
- Died: September 16, 1664 (aged 43–44) Mexico City
- Spouse: Teresa de Aguilera y Roche
- Profession: Custos, soldier, political, and administrator (Governor of New Mexico)
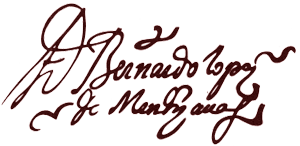
- Signature

Bernardo López de Mendizábal (1620 – September 16, 1664) was a Spanish politician, soldier, and religious scholar, who served as governor of Santa Fe de Nuevo México, (present-day New Mexico}, between 1659–1660 and as alcalde mayor in Guayacocotla (on the Sierra Madre Oriental, in modern Mexico). Among López's acts as governor of New Mexico, he prohibited the Franciscan priests from forcing the Native Americans to work if they were not paid a salary and recognized their right to practice their religion. These acts caused disagreements with the Franciscan missionaries of New Mexico in their dealings with the Native Americans. He was indicted by the Inquisition on thirty-three counts of malfeasance and the practice of Judaism in 1660. He was replaced in the same year and his administration ended. He was arrested in 1663 and died as a prisoner in 1664.

== Early years ==
López de Mendizábal was born about 1620 in the town of Chietla, in Puebla (in present-day Mexico). His father, Cristóbal López de Mendizábal, was a Basque captain and legal representative, while his mother, Leonor Pastrana, was a granddaughter of Juan Núñez de León, a Jew who was prosecuted by the inquisition, having been accused of secretly practicing Judaism. His family had a hacienda in Chietla. López also had a brother - Gregorio López de Mendizábal. López studied arts and canon law at the Jesuit college at Puebla, but finished his studies at the university in Mexico City. Mendizábal also joined the Spanish Army, where he served in the Galeón de la Armada. During a period of time, Lopez was part of the garrison of the Presidio of Cartagena de Indias (in modern Colombia). López occupied many government positions in Nueva Granada, Cuba, and New Spain. López was also alcalde mayor in Guayacocotla, on the Sierra Madre Oriental, in modern Mexico.

== Government in New Mexico ==
López de Mendizábal was appointed New Mexico's governor in 1658 to replace Juan Manso de Contreras. López and his wife arrived in Santa Fe late that year, although apparently he did not assume the position until July 11, 1659. During this period he also worked as a custos, an administrator that served to the Franciscans in this province.

López chose the Spaniard Miguel de Noriega (native of Burgos, Spain, but resident in Mexico city) as secretary of government.

López and Juan Ramírez, who arrived with him in New Mexico, clashed over his ideas about the established limits of the civil and religious functions. Also, López was accused for having established a similarity between himself and the Eucharist. This was "a statement that the Holy Office of the Inquisition" considered a serious matter. After this, López opposed to give Ramírez a welcome in Santa Fe. There were several major disagreements between López and the Franciscan missionaries in New Mexico, especially Alonso de Posada, which related to the payments of taxes by Native Americans who lived in the Franciscan missions. López believed that these natives should pay taxes like the other residents of New Mexico, while the missionaries thought that Native Americans who served the Church not should pay them and defended that these Indians were sanctioned if they paid the tributes. In addition, López banned that the Franciscans could beat up the Native Americans who worked in the missions, a punishment that the Franciscans exercised at times when they believed it was needed. Ironically, he was also charged with labour exploitation of the natives and kidnapping Apaches to sell as slaves.

The Franciscans registed the customs of López and his wife, Teresa, who, they suspected, was not a Christian. The records included their spotty attendance at Mass. However, López also recorded the "sexual indiscretions" who the clergy were carried out, whose members had sexual intercourse with women of their parishes. López himself also was engaging in that activity, as was recognized by the Franciscans.

López doubled the wages paid to the Native Americans who worked for the Spanish, and recognized the right of Native Americans to practice their religions and not to have to assist each Sunday at Mass. If the Franciscans inflicted corporal punishment for that reason, Native Americans could take reprisals against them. López allowed the preservation of the ceremonial dances of the Pueblo Native Americans, comparing them with dances such as the zarambeque, often performed in Spain, which were not banned by the church. In fact, he and his wife attended these dances and the governor permitted the Pueblos to perform their religious dances in the Governor's Palace in Santa Fe. However, the Franciscans continued to try to prevent any non-Christian practices.

In Taos, New Mexico, López appointed as leaders the Pueblo Indians who had murdered the previous priest, leading the Franciscans to accuse him of ordering disobedience by the Amerindians against their order.

López also killed and enslaved Native Americans. In the 1660s, he murdered Navajo traders who traveled to Jémez lands to sell their products, while he captured their women and children to use them as personal slaves. On another occasion he led military campaigns against the Navajos and the Apaches of Taos, capturing hundreds of them and selling them in places further south.

The population in New Mexico was divided in two groups according to their support for López. Part of the population supported the governor's political actions, while the other rejected them and sent letters against him to the Viceroy of New Spain. In 1660, the missionary priests agreed to leave the province, having rejected the governor and the difficulty he created for their religious activity because of the new laws in New Mexico. However, they ended up staying in the province. Former Governor Manso, whom Mendizábal had as a prisoner while he ruled New Mexico, moved to Mexico City where he led a revolt against López.

The charges against López resulted in the appointment of a new governor to New Mexico in 1660, Diego de Peñalosa, who arrived in New Mexico and assumed the position in mid-August 1661.

== Charges against him and his last years ==
In November 1661, having left his residence in the governor's house, López tried to bribe Peñalosa with 6,000 pesos to rule out or at least to minimize the charges made against him. However, Peñalosa would not accept a bribe of less than 10,000 pesos. López refused to pay this amount, so the governors did not reach any agreement. In the same month Peñalosa abolished López's law regarding taxes, forcing the Amerindians at missions to pay tribute.

In December 1661, Peñalosa charged López with 33 counts of malfeasance that took place while he governed New Mexico. This included a law that forced to settlers, Amerindians and clergy to give their goods to Mendizábal, the sale of these goods in Parral and Sonora, in modern Mexico, and the organization of military campaigns against the Apaches to obtain slaves to sell. At the same time, Juan Manso returned to the province in the position of alguacil mayor of the Inquisition for imprison López and his wife. However, before the arrest was effected, Peñalosa promised to help him to leave the province if he gives him some of their lands. López refused to transfer lands to Peñalosa and these were confiscated by him.

In the summer of 1662, Lopez "was barred from holding" any political charge for eight years and was forced to pay a fine of 3,000 pesos. Later, in 1663, the Inquisition jailed López and his wife, both for counts of malfeasance and for practicing Judaism. They were imprisoned in Santo Domingo Pueblo, in Mexico City. López arrived in Mexico City suffering from an unnamed ailment. The judgments of marriage dragged on and López died on September 16, 1664, because of the ailment.

== After his death ==
He was buried in a pen near the prison. Several months later, his wife's judgment was suspended and she was released from the prison. Teresa pressed for her husband's exhumation and, in April 1671, the Holy Office dropped the case and "his body was exhumed and reburied in the Church of Santo Domingo (Puebla)", now the city center in Mexico City.

== Personal life ==
In Cartagena, before his appointment as governor of New Mexico, he met and married Teresa de Aguilera y Roche, a native of Alexsandria, Italy. López opened a store in the Casa Real of Santa Fe, trading products such as sugar, chocolate, hats and shoes, among others, to the colonists. Amerindians (especially Pueblos) worked for López manufacturing different products for his business including leather goods, whole stockings, and other products as well as wagons for caravans, etc.
