= Pima Revolt (1751) =

1751–1752 revolt against Spanish settlers in Arizona

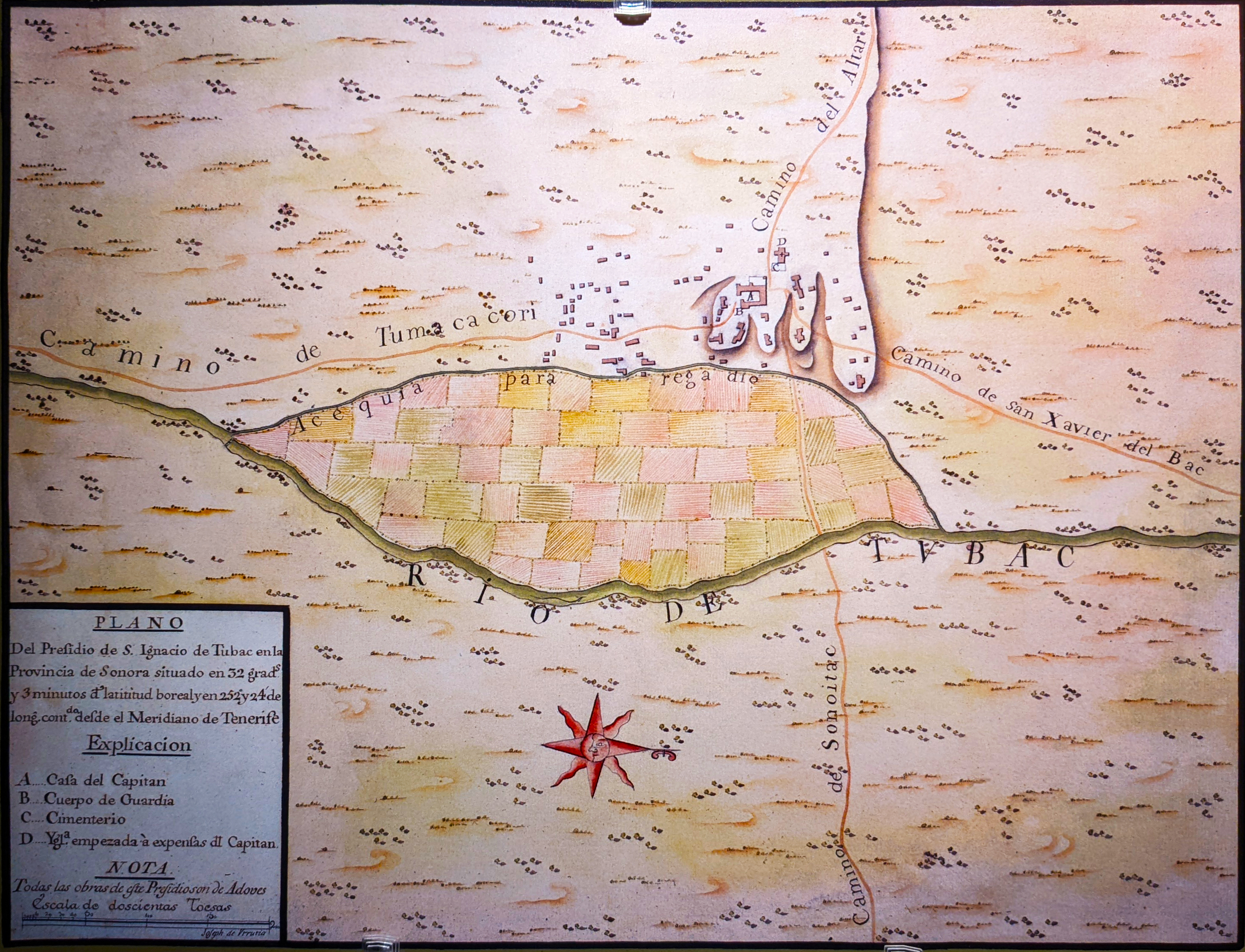
A Spanish colonial map of Tubac from 1767, the site of the San Ignacio de Tubac Presidio, constructed as a result of conflicts with the Pima and other natives.

The Pima Revolt, also known as the Oʼodham Uprising or the Pima Outbreak, was a revolt of Pima Native Americans in 1751 against colonial forces in Spanish Arizona and one of the major northern frontier conflicts in early New Spain.

== Background ==
The revolt culminated from decades of violence by the local Spanish settlers against Natives beginning in 1684. The period was characterized by local Natives gradual loss of autonomy and territory. Treaties allowing the Spanish to mine and herd on Native lands led to an influx of new settlers; by 1760, Hispanos had become a substantial presence in the present-day American Southwest. However, the colonial province of Sonora was characterized by a larger native population, and more frequent conflict between them and the Spaniards. The Pima Revolt was directly preceded by the Seri Revolt of Seri Natives in Sonora.

== Uprising ==
While the Pima people had no central authority, the charismatic Luis Oacpicagigua (Luis of Sáric) began the task of uniting—with varying degrees of success—the disparate groups, numbering at least 15,000 people, under a single war plan. The initial act of rebellion was the killing of 18 settlers lured to Oacpicagigua's home in Sáric on November 20th, 1751. Over the next day, uprisings followed in Caborca, Pitiquito, Oquitoa, Atil, Tubutama, Sonoyta, Busani, Agua Caliente, Baboquivari, Arivaca, and Tubac; more than a hundred settlers were killed.

Oacpicagigua surrendered to Captain José Díaz del Carpio on March 18, 1752 after a negotiated peace. When the Pima leaders laid the blame for the revolt on Jesuit missionaries (who would be expelled from Spain and its colonies in 1767), they were pardoned by the colonial governor Ortiz Parrilla.

== After the conflict ==
Small scale conflict soon began again, however, and Oacpicagigua eventually died in a Spanish prison in 1755. The colonial government founded three new presidios in Sonora to control the Pima and Seri populace in the years after the revolt: San Ignacio de Tubac, Santa Gertrudis de Altar, and San Carlos de Buenavista, present-day Tubac, Arizona, Altar, Sonora, and Buenavista, Sonora, respectively. While intermittent rebellions continued most notably Jabanimo revolt in 1756, by the end of the eighteenth century, Sonoran natives had been largely missionized or Hispanicized, and the assimilated tribes of frontier New Spain were absorbed into the Spanish Empire.
