= Ures =

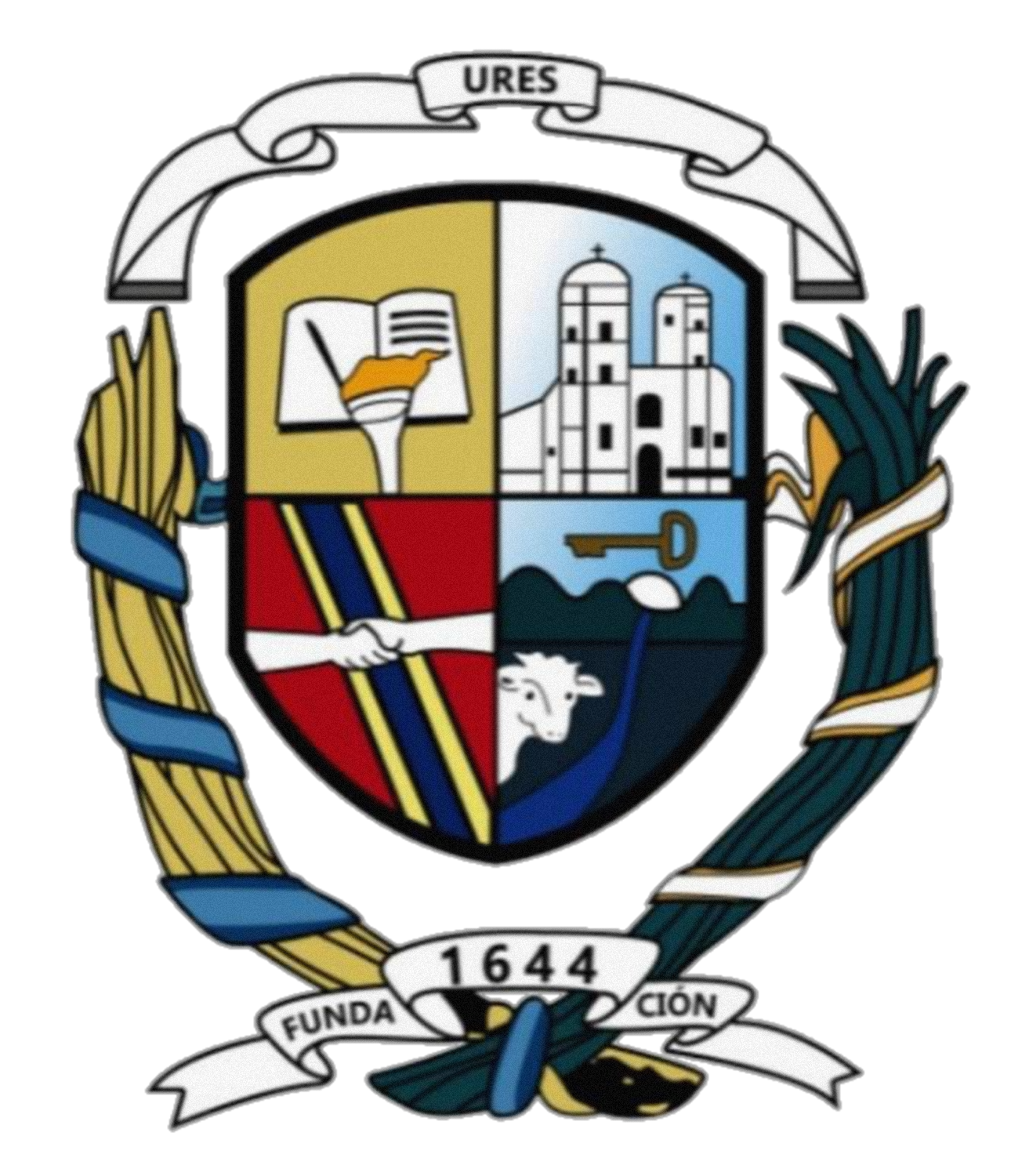
- Coat of arms

- Location within Sonora Location within Mexico
- Coordinates: 29°25′N 110°23′W
- Country: Mexico
- State: Sonora
- Municipality: Ures

Population (2020)
  - Total: 8,548
- Time zone: UTC-7 (Pacific (US Mountain))

Ures is a small city and a municipality in the Mexican state of Sonora.

In 2023, Ures was designated a Pueblo Mágico by the Mexican government, recognizing its cultural and historical importance.

== Population ==
In the year 2000, the total population was 9,553 residents. New figures from 2005 reported 8,420, meaning a considerable decline in population due to emigration. The municipal seat had a population of 3,959 in 2000.

== Geography ==
It has an area of 2,618.56 square kilometers. This is 1.41% of the total area of the state, and 0.13 percent of the national area of Mexico. Besides the seat, the most important localities are Guadalupe de Ures, San Pedro, Pueblo de Alamos and El Sauz.

The municipality is in the basin of the Sonora River. As the river crosses the area, the river receives waters from Los Alamos, Bamuco, Nava, San Pedro, Cañada de Agua, and Los Cochis. Also, it receives runoff from washes as El Carrizo, Zuribate, Palo Parado, La Ladrillera, Santiago, and El Pescado. It has a reservoir that was recently built called Teópari.

The municipality is nestled within the mountains, hills, and valleys that form the edge of the Western Sierra Madre. The elevation of the administrative seat was 420 meters above sea level.

=== Climate ===
The average maximum monthly temperature is 31.8 °C (89.2 °F) in the month of July, the average minimum monthly temperature is 15.2 °C (59.4 °F) in the month of January, and the overall average temperature is 23.1 °C (73.6 °F). The annual precipitation is 430.1 millimetres (16.93 in), and the rainiest months are July and August. There are occasional frosts from December to March.

=== Vegetation ===
The vegetation is of mesquite and subtropical desert species.

== Communications ==
A paved federal highway crosses the municipality from west to east.

== History ==
Ures is one of the oldest cities of the state of Sonora. It was first reported by Cabeza de Vaca on his overland trek from Galveston in the 1530s and was called by him "Corazones", or "Village of Hearts". Coronado stopped there in the course of his 1540 expedition. A mission was founded there in 1644 by the Jesuit missionary Francisco París, and was known as San Miguel de Ures until 1665. In 1823 Ures became the capital of Sonora, but was replaced the following year when Sonora was merged into Occidente State.

At the end of 1838, Ures became a city; and was the capital of Sonora from 1838 to 1842, and again from 1847 to 1879. Afterwards, it became the seat of a district.

During the Fall of the Second Mexican Empire in 1866, the Battle of Guadalupe took place within the municipality of Ures. On September 5, 1998, the state legislature gave it the title of Heroic City, commemorating the liberal defense against imperialists. . Geronimo took refuge in the mountains of this region when generals Crook and Miles fought him in Arizona. The most notable Apache raids were in 1870, when the priest Echevería was killed in the town, and in 1882, when the distinguished scholar Leocadio Salcedo was killed at the La Noria ranch. Residents of the region also had problems with Yaqui uprisings and insurrections of the late 19th and early 20th centuries.

== Tourism ==
In Ures you can visit "La Plaza de Armas (La Plaza de Zaragoza)" with its four 18th-century bronze sculptures, San Miguel Mission and the church bearing the same name with its legendary mesquite stairway. In addition, you will see the majestic arch commemorating the Independence and the house where General Pesqueira used to live, The Folkloric Museum, and the old Flour Mill.

== Government ==
=== Municipal presidents ===
Municipal president	Term	Political party	Notes
Adeodato Campbell Quijada	1868		
Fernando M. Araiza	1913–1914		
Ernesto Estrella	1914–1915		
Victoriano Navarro	1915		
Alfredo Romo	1916		
F. J. Morales	1917		
Constantino Laborín	1920–1922		
Jesús Casillas	1922–1923		
Santiago Muñoz	1923–1929		
Luis S. Navarro	1929–1931	PNR	
Victoriano Navarro	1931	PNR	Acting municipal president
Luis Haro	1931–1932	PNR	
Jesús Núñez D.	1932–1933	PNR	
Rafael Puebla	1933	PNR	Acting municipal president
Miguel Canizales Bonilla	1933–1935	PNR	
Manuel J. Duarte	1935	PNR	Acting municipal president
Pedro López P.	1935–1937	PNR	
Antonio Arce	1937	PNR	Acting municipal president
Rafael Puebla	1937–1940	PNR; PRM	
Anselmo Gándara	1940–1943	PRM	
Reynaldo Paz Molinares	1943–1946	PRM	
Jesús Noriega Calles	1946–1949	PRI	
Alfredo Romo Córdova	1949–1952	PRI	
Rubén Romo Córdova	1952–1955	PRI	
Francisco Amador Torres	1955–1958	PRI	
Antonio Gándara Romo	1958–1961	PRI	
Héctor Maytorena Salcido	1961–1964	PRI	
Moisés Navarro Duarte	1964–1967	PRI	
Francisco Téllez Villaescusa	1967–1970	PRI	
Abel Estrella Bustamante	1970–1973	PRI	
Héctor Romo Córdova	1973–1976	PRI	
Guadalupe Trujillo Romo	1976–1979	PRI	
Óscar Jara Ramírez	1979–1982	PRI	
Eduardo A. de los Reyes Gray	1982–1985	PRI	
Marco Antonio Romo Aguilar	1985–1988	PRI	
Eduardo Salcido Celaya	1988–1991	PRI	
Jorge Alberto Gastélum	1991–1994	PRI	
Ramón Mario López Córdova	1994–1997	PRI	
Manuel Ignacio Espinoza González	1997–2000	PRD	
Arnoldo Trujillo Fuentes	2000–2003	PRI	
Marco Antonio Coronado Acuña	16-09-2003–15-09-2006	PRI	
Juan Ángel Córdova Salcido	16-09-2006–15-09-2009	PRI; Panal	Alliance PRI Sonora-Panal
Noé Coronado Cha	16-09-2009–15-09-2012	PAN	
José Manuel Valenzuela Salcido	16-09-2012–15-09-2015	PAN	
David Gracia Paz	16-09-2015–15-09-2018	PRI; PVEM; Panal	Coalition "For an Honest and Effective Government"
Héctor Gastón Rodríguez Galindo	16-09-2018–15-09-2021	PAN; PRD	Coalition "For Sonora to the Front"
José Manuel Valenzuela Salcido	16-09-2021–15-09-2024	Morena	
Héctor Gastón Rodríguez Galindo	16-09-2024–	PAN; PRI; PRD	

== Sources consulted ==
- Enciclopedia de los Municipios de Mexico
- INEGI National statistics
