= Pimería Alta =

Viceroyalty of New Spain area now called Pimeria Alta

Coordinates: 32°N 112°W

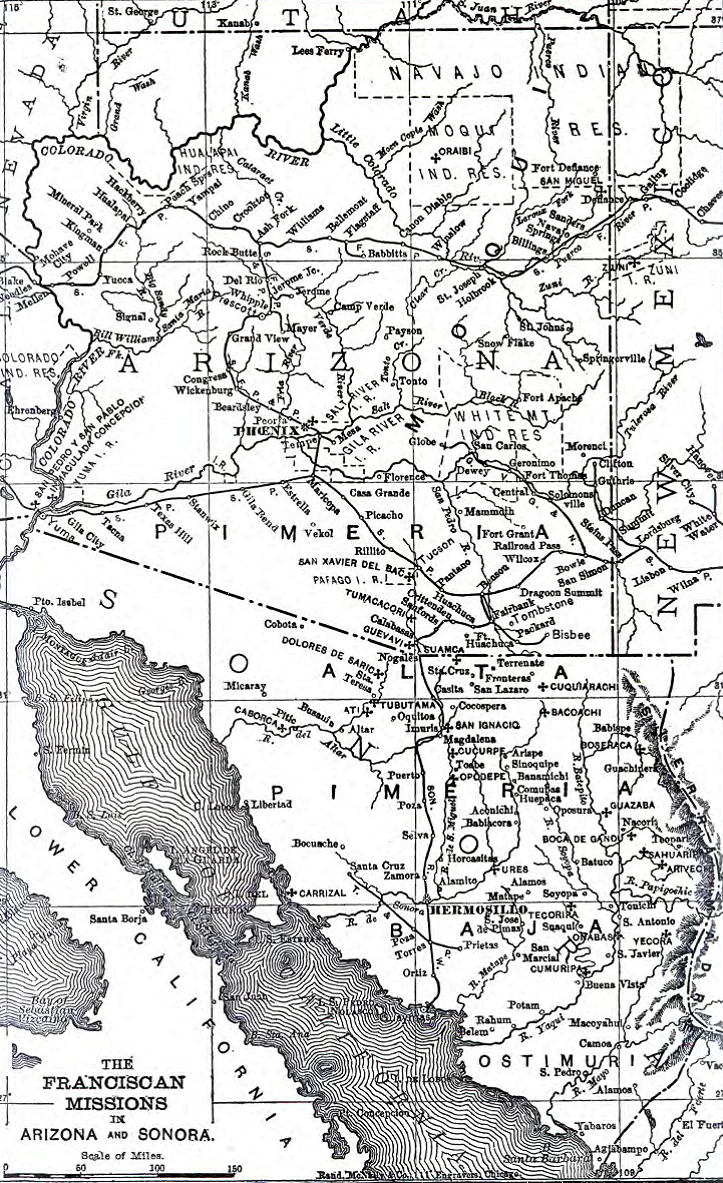
Spanish missions in the Sonoran Desert

The Pimería Alta (translated to 'Upper Pima Land'/'Land of the Upper Pima' in English) was an area of the 18th century New Navarre province in the Viceroyalty of New Spain, that encompassed parts of what are today southern Arizona in the United States and northern Sonora in Mexico.

The area took its name from the Pima and closely related O'odham (Papago) peoples residing in the Sonoran Desert. Pimería Alta was the site of the Spanish missions in the Sonoran Desert established by the Jesuit missionary Eusebio Kino in the late 17th and early 18th centuries. A significant Pima rebellion against Spanish rule occurred in 1751.

== Terminology ==
The term Pimería Alta first appeared in Spanish colonial documents (especially produced by those in the Catholic Church) to designate an ethno-territorial expanse that spanned much of what is now southern Arizona and northern Sonora. The term derives from the name of the Pima indigenous peoples native to the region. This term, along with the term ‘Pimería Baja’, was a designation used by the Spanish in the Viceroyalty of New Spain to create a geographic distinction between where the different dialects of the Pima language were spoken. While the region was not a political entity, its geographic contours have been described as:

bounded on the north by the Gila River, on the south by the Altar River Valley, and on the west by the Colorado River and the Gulf of California, and to the east by the San Pedro River Valley.

== Pre-contact history ==
Before the first Spanish incursions into the region in the late 17th century, what would come to be the Pimería Alta was home to a diverse array of indigenous tribes. Upon the arrival of the Spaniards, these tribes included:

[The] Pápagos (now considered a derogatory term for the Tohono O’odham); Pimas, Sobaipuris, and Gileños (Akimel O’odham); Sobas and Areneños (possibly Hia Ced O’odham); and the Yuman-speaking Coco-maricopas and Opas (Maricopas, or Pee Posh). Neighboring groups along the region’s periphery included Jocomes, Apaches, Yumas (Quechan); Quíquimas (Halyikwamai), Cocopah, Seris, Nébomes (Eudeves), and Ópatas.

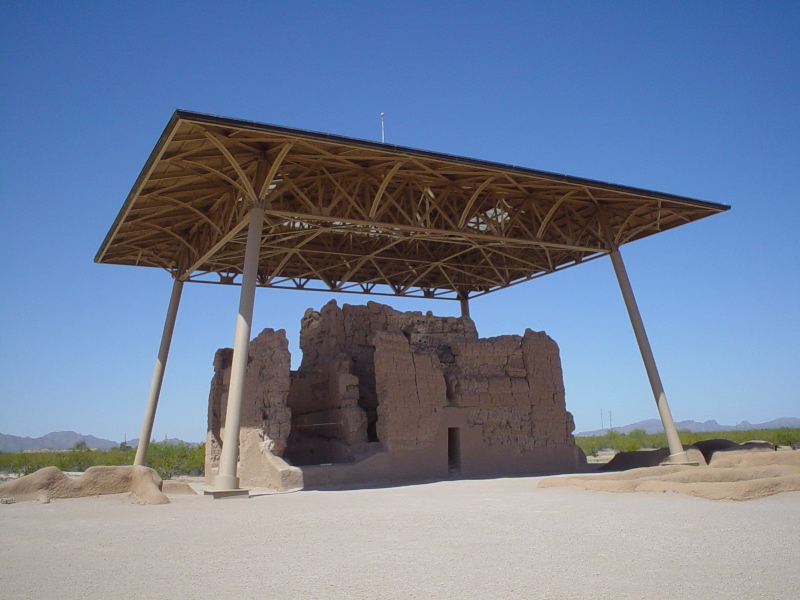
Casa Grande Ruins National Monument, near Coolidge, Arizona. Produced by the Hohokam, it is one example of pre-contact indigenous settlements in the region built before the Colonial period.

Even prior to the settlement of these groups in what would come to be the Pimería Alta, humans had settled in the region more than three thousand years before. According to archaeological records, settlements and irrigation canals have been found in the river valleys of the region as far back as 2100 BC. Groups such as the Hohokam, widely considered to be the ancestors of the O’odham, would inhabit the region from approximately AD 500 to AD 1450. While each indigenous group native to the Pimería Alta had its own cultural idiosyncrasies, it can be generalized that those residing in the region were mostly semi-nomadic, relied on crops such as beans, squash and maize to subsist in addition to wild native plants, and were master artisans and pottery makers. There is evidence that those in the region also participated in trade networks that spanned hundreds of kilometers. For instance, evidence indicates trade initiating in the region was done as far west as the Gulf of California and as far south as Central Mexico. Items traded included (but were not limited to) copper bells, precious stones, and shells. Besides settlement of the region by the ancestors of groups such as the Hohokam, this region would also become occupied by Apache groups beginning in the 17th century, whose presence would be detailed in Spanish colonial documents recounting the first expeditions northward. The remains of many pre-contact indigenous settlements in the area persist to this day.

== First Spanish incursions ==
While the southern section of the Sonoran province of New Spain (or Pimería Baja) had been explored by missionaries and begun to be settled by colonists at the first half of the 17th century, incursions into the Pimería Alta can be traced to several decades later. The first known Spanish incursion was made by Father Eusebio Kino, who in 1687 settled his first mission, Nuestra Señora de los Dolores de Cósari, in what is now northern Sonora. Father Kino, a Jesuit sent to the region to establish various missionary settlements, began establishing what would come to be a network of over a dozen missions in the region, not all of which are solely attributable to him (see Spanish missions in the Sonoran Desert). The missions of the Pimería Alta had several functions. While proselytizing to indigenous people was one, it also served as a place where the previously nomadic people of the region were settled into sedentary, agricultural lifestyles and became influenced by Spanish religion and culture, at the behest of the Jesuits. Relatedly, the converted indigenous people became a source of economic support for the missions through their labor (directed by missionaries), which was necessary to the success of the mission.

Within the framework of the missions, indigenous peoples were not only instruments of colonization, but also had access to a certain degree of authority within native councils based on these missions, termed cabildos. As Cynthia Radding points out:

Indigenous officers of these councils, bearing titles of alcaldes, fiscales, topiles, and gobernadores modeled on Hispanic norms of municipal government and carrying canes of office as insignia of their authority, enforced law and order in the mission pueblos. Missionaries governed through the councils, in a form of indirect rule, and their presence was indispensable in implementing religious observance and work discipline; that is, for Christian indoctrination and the production of surpluses destined for circulation among the missions and for sale in colonial markets.

In this case, cabildos both entrenched Spanish control while also granting indigenous peoples living on missions a certain degree of autonomy within the colonial structure. This fact is also significant since, while Jesuit missionaries were the administrators of indigenous lands, they were not the legal proprietors. Under the mission structure, these lands were still legally tied to the indigenous peoples of the mission.

== Colonial period of the Pimería Alta ==
The Jesuit missions of the Pimeria Alta functioned as a fundamental part of Spanish settlement and colonization in the region. In the words of scholars John G. Douglass and William M. Graves:

[t]he mission system in the Pimería Alta had two fundamental duties: to represent the Spanish Crown and convert native groups to Christianity. Throughout their history, these missions relied on Native American labor for economic support. As the Pimería Alta became more economically and politically important to colonial efforts in the early 1700s, settlements and military posts called presidios were also established by colonial administrators, as were mining enterprises and small support settlements.

Despite the initial success of several missions in the area at converting indigenous peoples to Christianity and turning them to sedentary lifestyles, the incursion of the Spanish in the region was oftentimes met with native resistance. A clear example of this is in the fear expressed by many Spaniards – missionaries, colonists, and military men alike – of Apache raids throughout the time period. These raids, along with occasional revolts by the Pima, made the region a hostile place for Spanish colonization.

In the words of a Spanish traveler recounting his observations of the region during the second half of the 18th century:

En el valor son todos los pimas muy inferiores a los ópatas, pues solo su número suele a veces infundirles osadía y atrevimiento, lo que se ha visto claramente en su último ya varias veces citado alzamiento de 1751, cuando primero solo se defendieron solo diez hombres, y de estos la mitad sin saber manejar las armas con acierto, de todo su gran numero, y porfiada rabia con que quisieron beberles la sangre, y a los padres Jacobo Sedelmayr y padre rector Juan Nentuig asaltaron por dos días la casa del misionero de Tubutama, hasta dejarla con su nueva y bien alhajada iglesia reducida en cenizas...

Translated, the account reads:

In valor all of the Pimas are very inferior to the Opatas, since often only their large numbers fill them with audacity and daring, which has been seen clearly in their last, numerously cited uprising in 1751, when first only ten men defended themselves, and of these half of them without knowing how to handle the weapons with certainty, of all their great numbers, and obstinate rage with which they wanted to drink their blood, and to the fathers Jacobo Sedelmayr and the padre rector Juan Nentuig they attacked for two days the house of the missionary of Tubutama, until leaving it with its new and well-built church reduced to rubble.

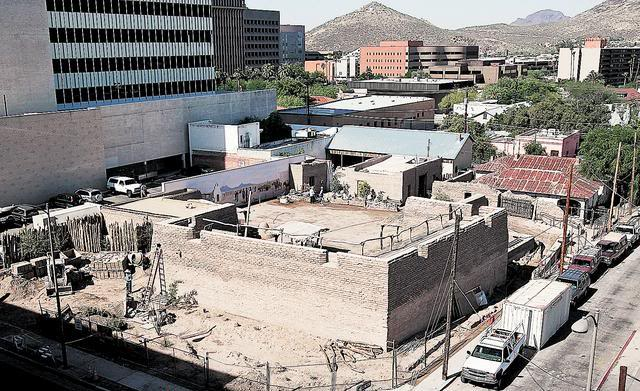
Overhead photo of the Presidio San Agustín del Tucson in Tucson, Arizona.

The primary response to native resistance was force. This was best manifested in Spanish military expeditions into the region (sent from further south), of which the establishment of presidios (or military fortifications) were a fundamental component. In the region, a total of 8 presidios were established during the colonial period as a direct response to raids by the Apache and Seris in the region. These presidios often served as a precursor to permanent settlements (as was the case with the Presidio San Agustín del Tucson).

An example of an account depicting such a military expedition is from a campaign journal written by Spanish commanders embarking on a military expedition against the Pimas in the Pimería Alta for four months in 1695:

From the mountain peaks they are able to do whatever they wish, and the Spaniards are unable to punish them because the rebels have united for this purpose on these frontiers and those of Sonora. We have seen the pride of these tribes [Janos, Jocomes, Mansos, Sumas, Chinarras, Apaches], and we have also seen that due to their instigation the Pima Indians have frequently rebelled against the royal crown, killing the missionary padres of the Society of Jesus, some Spaniards, and some natives of this same province. (Note: the Pima rebellions happened independently of those occurring in the eastern Pimería Alta.)

Significantly, however, not all indigenous peoples openly rebelled against Spanish colonization. Many indigenous peoples in the Pimeria Alta found ways to adapt within the new conditions imposed by Spanish settlement and conquest and made use of official institutions to seek redress when necessary. Additionally, it was not uncommon for indigenous peoples on missions to be attacked during Apache raids against the Spanish.

As the region became increasingly colonized by the Spanish settlers, they began to establish themselves around increasingly sparse water-bound areas (especially on the riverine areas of the Sonoran Desert). Attempts at agricultural production here were common, and haciendas were often worked by native indigenous workers. Agricultural production was accompanied with efforts to graze cattle in the region and small-scale mining efforts. However, in part due to the scarcity of water, large-scale flooding, and the geography of the desert region, these efforts never produced as much comparable wealth as other parts of New Spain further south. Because of this, these efforts proved to be of relatively little economic significance to the crown.

Adding to this was the local nature of economic production and exchange in the region throughout the colonial period. As noted by Cynthia Radding:

Provincial markets remained small and basically local in scope, shifting with different mining bonanzas. The slow and uneven growth of marketing networks in Sonora, in contrast with Nueva Vizcaya and Nueva Galicia where urban centers developed more steadily, retarded the advance of private landholding.

The landscape of Spanish colonization in the region changed upon the expulsion of the Jesuits in 1767, a change widely grouped with the Bourbon Reforms of the late colonial period. Many of the missions previously run by the Jesuits were turned over to members of the secular clergy. Despite this change in administration, the missions underwent a general state of decline in both structure and in the number of indigenous peoples rooted to them. This came in contrast to the settlements and presidios in the region, many of which kept expanding throughout the colonial period and into the independence period (often at the expense of the missions). Upon the decline of mission settlements, many of the indigenous peoples whose communities were based around the physical and administrative structure of the mission found their lands increasingly encroached upon by private Spanish interests. The expansion of Spanish private land claims often came at the expense of the historic right to commons that characterized indigenous life on missions. Despite this change, several indigenous communities continued to work the land originally allocated to them while living on the mission. As Radding points out:

In the 1790s, nearly a quarter century after the expulsion of the Jesuits, Opata family milpas and village laborers were irrigated from the same network of earthen acequias maintained by community labor. These walled adobe villages, situated on terraces overlooking the riverbed, conserved their pre-Hispanic legacy, reinforced by the mission experience.

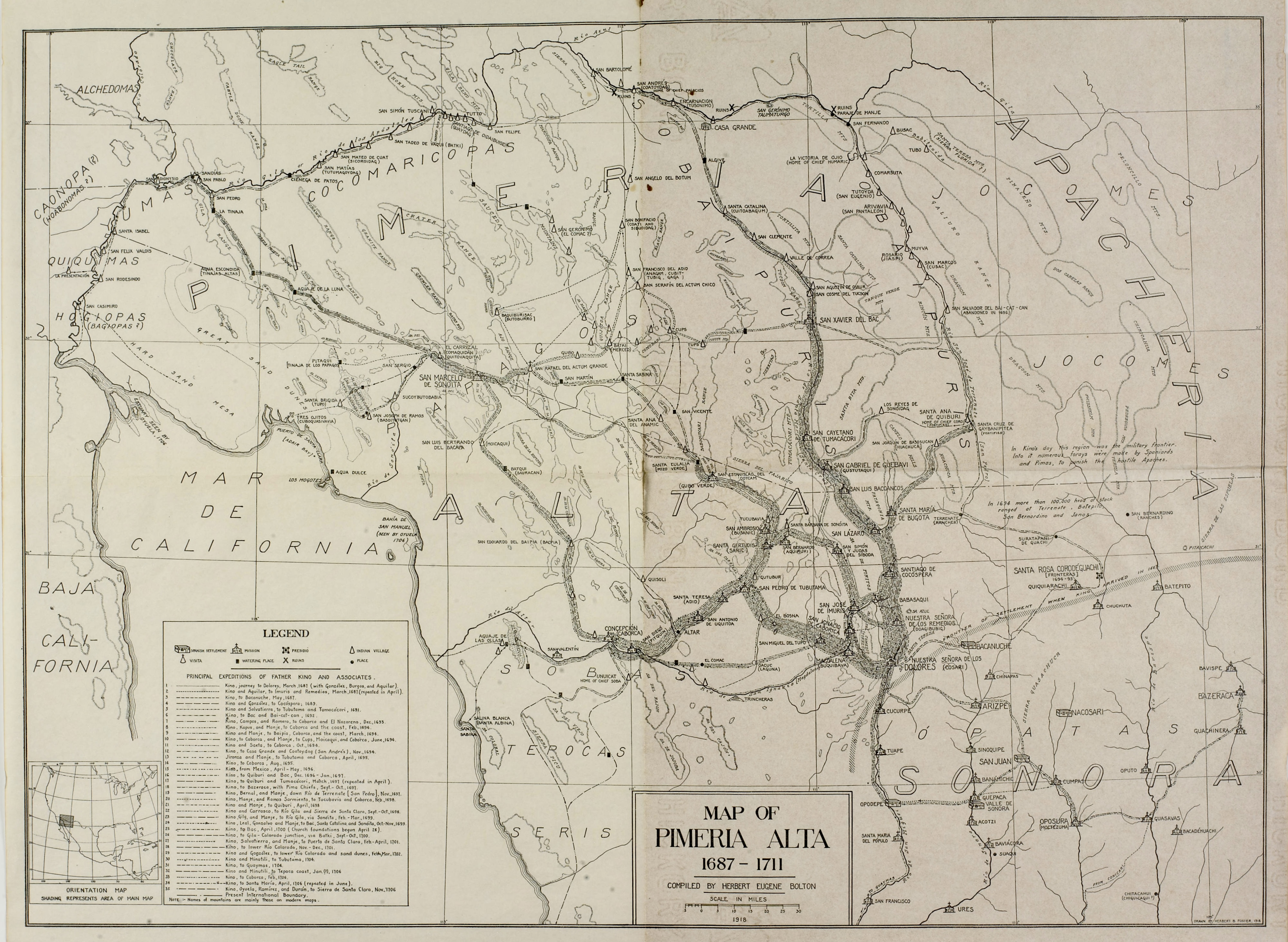
Map of the Pimería Alta, 1687-1711 (historical map produced by Herbert E. Bolton, 1918)

Despite the local character of the economy of the Pimería Alta, the social stratification increasingly produced by Spanish private land claims and associated enterprises (agricultural production, cattle grazing, and small-scale mining) created a division between Spanish hacendados and indigenous peasants. This was compounded by the fact that landholding (in turn determined by access to water) became “an instrument of social control.” The problems that this stratification produced proceeded well into the independence period.

== Post-colonial period ==
The impact of colonization in the region cannot be overestimated. Through its inhabitants, remnants of Spanish and native indigenous cultural customs would become a part of life in the Pimería Alta even after the end of the colonial period in 1821. Many of the customs and economic practices characteristic of the region would become entrenched into the independence period. Still it is important to reflect on the differences brought about during both the Mexican independence period and the US after the Gadsden Purchase.

As scholar Edward H. Spencer has articulated, Mexican government policies towards indigenous peoples in the region could be grouped into three categories, all of which had as their primary goal assimilation of indigenous people into Mexican society. The first involved granting of Mexican citizenship, which both hypothetically granted political rights to indigenous peoples of the region while simultaneously stripping them of their political status as ‘Indians’. The second meant attempts to assimilate indigenous peoples into the local Mexican political system, followed thirdly by distribution of small, individual land plots to indigenous families. These policies collectively went against practices established by missionaries in the colonial period, such as communal agricultural production and political organization with a relative degree of autonomy from Spanish authorities. When these policies failed, the Mexican state often used deportations of indigenous peoples of the region (see Yaqui Wars) to other parts of the country as a last response to resistance. This response by the Mexican government was coupled with active military aggression. Only in the early 20th century did Mexican government policy shift to include more co-operational approaches to indigenous communities, shifting away from the attempts to institute ‘democratic individualism’ in the 19th century.

Upon the end of the Mexican–American War in 1848, the Pimería Alta remained part of Mexican state of Sonora and the region continued to be impacted by Mexican political reforms. It was not until 1853 with the signing of the Gadsden Purchase that the northern portion of what was the Pimería Alta was incorporated into the Arizona territory, with the southern portion remaining part of Mexico. The relationship of the US government towards the native residents of the Pimería Alta was radically different from that of the Mexican government. The main tenet of US policy was the forced settlement of indigenous peoples on government demarcated Indian reservations, physically separate from US settlements at large. This approach was in line with patterns of settlement by Anglo-Americans in the newly incorporated Southwestern territories, which alienated indigenous peoples from their prior landholdings. Through the Bureau of Indian Affairs, the government's policy involved the three tenants of “individual landholding, compulsory education, and religious replacement”. Prior Mexican residents of the region staked out their claim within US settlements, despite the existence of legal racial barriers. Significantly, the landholding claims of Mexican settlers in the region were, while technically respected under the clauses of the Gadsden Purchase, frequently violated and conceded to Anglo-settlers. US settlement in the region was followed by later settlement by African-Americans, Chinese, and other migrant groups who would become attracted to the region's economic opportunities brought on in part by the copper mining boom of the late 19th century and by increased agricultural development in the region. Reservations continue to be a facet of life for many Indian nations in the US and their members to the present-day.

== Legacy ==
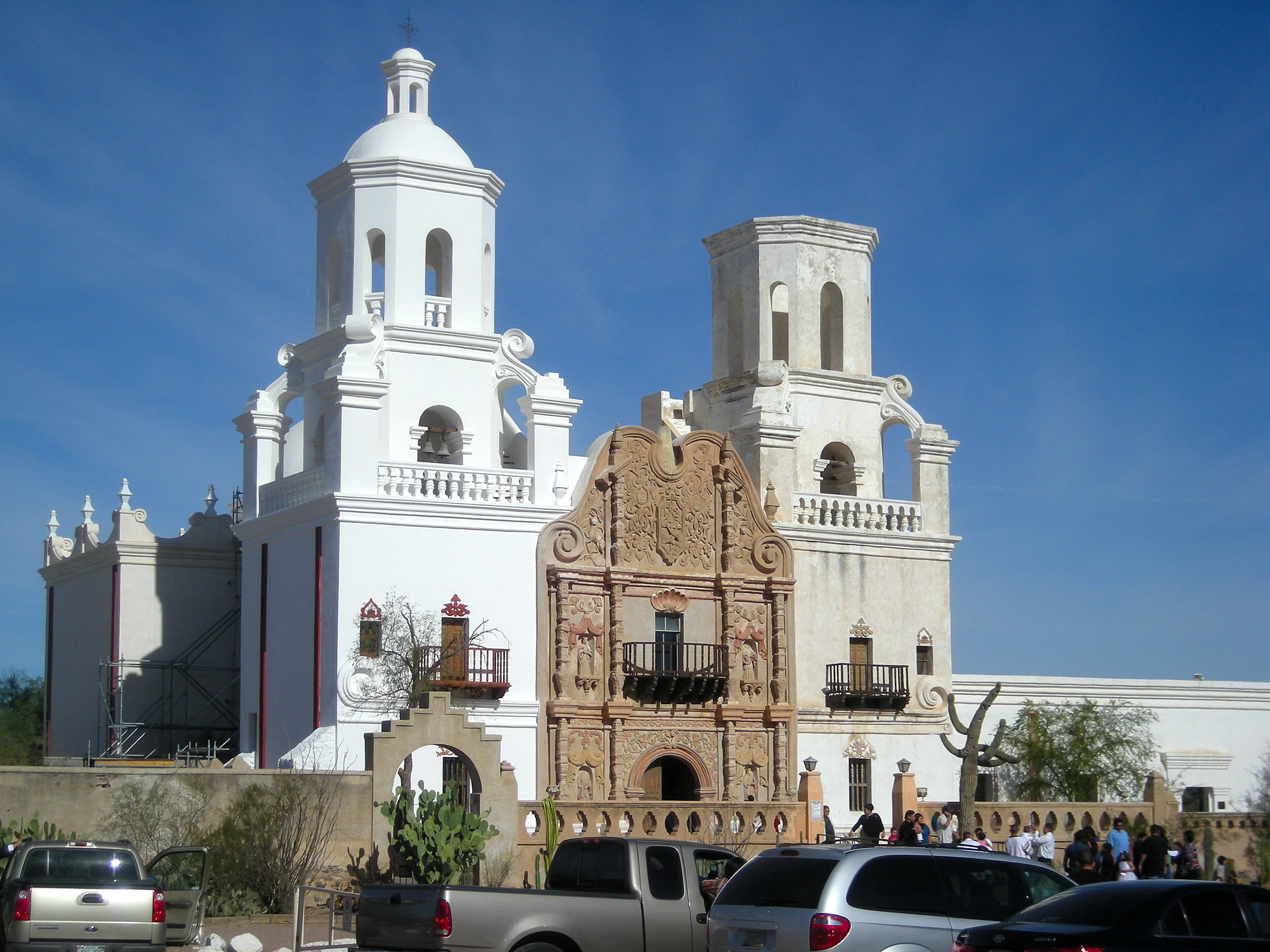
Frontal view of the Mission San Xavier del Bac near Tucson, Arizona. It is one of several missions founded in the Pimería Alta that continue to function.

Much of the Pimería Alta region spans the Sonoran Desert, one of the most ecologically diverse and wettest deserts in the world. Cultural and economic exchanges across national frontiers persisted even after US incorporation of the northern Pimeria Alta region, especially as the result of migration patterns. This exchange persisted despite US restrictions on cross-border economic exchanges and migration, many of which were first implemented in the early 20th century (see Immigration Act of 1924 and Mexican Americans). Also present is the persistent cultural influence of indigenous peoples (including those within the Tohono O’odham, Pascua Yaqui, Ak-Chin and Gila River reservations) as well as those who settled in the region from the colonial period to the present day. Today, the San Xavier Indian Reservation, the second largest Indian reservation in Arizona, is situated in this region, as are the physical vestiges of mission structures and several presidios in both Arizona and Sonora. The ecological impact of European and American colonization in the region has been heavy, with many sources of water (including rivers) having dried out over time due to overuse, manipulation of the environment, and climate change.

== Bibliography ==
- Albrecht Classen, "Transcultural Encounters: German Jesuit Missionaries in the Pimería Alta," in Martinson, Steven D. / Schulz, Renate A. (eds./Hrsg.), Transcultural German Studies / Deutsch als Fremdsprache: Building Bridges / Brücken bauen (Bern etc., Peter Lang, 2008) (Jahrbuch für Internationale Germanistik, Reihe A: Kongressberichte, 94),
