= History of Mar Menor =

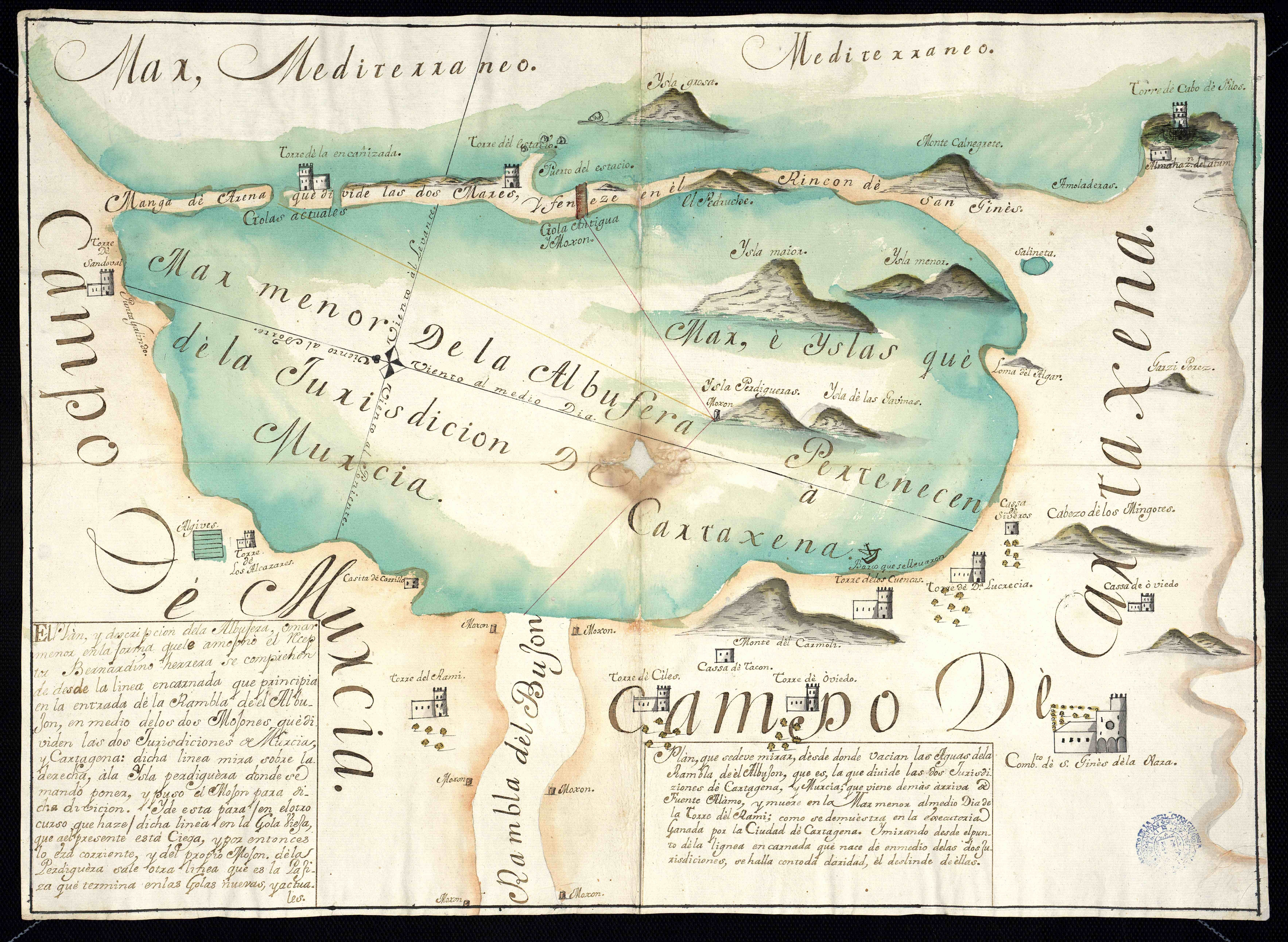
The Mar Menor, on an 18th-century map.

Mar Menor’s history spans from prehistoric occupation to modern tourism development, reflecting layers of cultural and environmental change. Early human presence is attested by sites such as the Marchamalo salt flats, dated to the Copper Age and featuring circular huts focused on fishing. Under the Roman Empire, the lagoon—called Palus—hosted a thriving salting industry devoted to garum production and maritime trade. Later, the area came under Arab rule, and characteristic fishing devices known as encañizadas were established. In the thirteenth century, Alfonso X of Castile seized the Taifa of Murcia, expelling its Muslim inhabitants and encouraging Christian settlers. Pirate incursions continued well into the early modern era, prompting construction of watchtowers and fortifications by monarchs such as Charles V and Philip II.

During the nineteenth century, the formation of municipalities like San Javier and San Pedro del Pinatar ushered in administrative changes that set the stage for twentieth-century development projects, including lighthouses, air bases, and resorts. The mid-1900s brought a tourism boom—especially in La Manga—supported by public and private investment during the Franco regime. However, rapid urbanization and limited environmental protections led to major ecological challenges, including reduced salinity and habitat loss. Today, the Mar Menor's historical evolution is mirrored in its cultural heritage and ongoing conservation debates, underscoring the lagoon's significance as both a natural and historical landmark in southeastern Spain.

== Prehistory ==
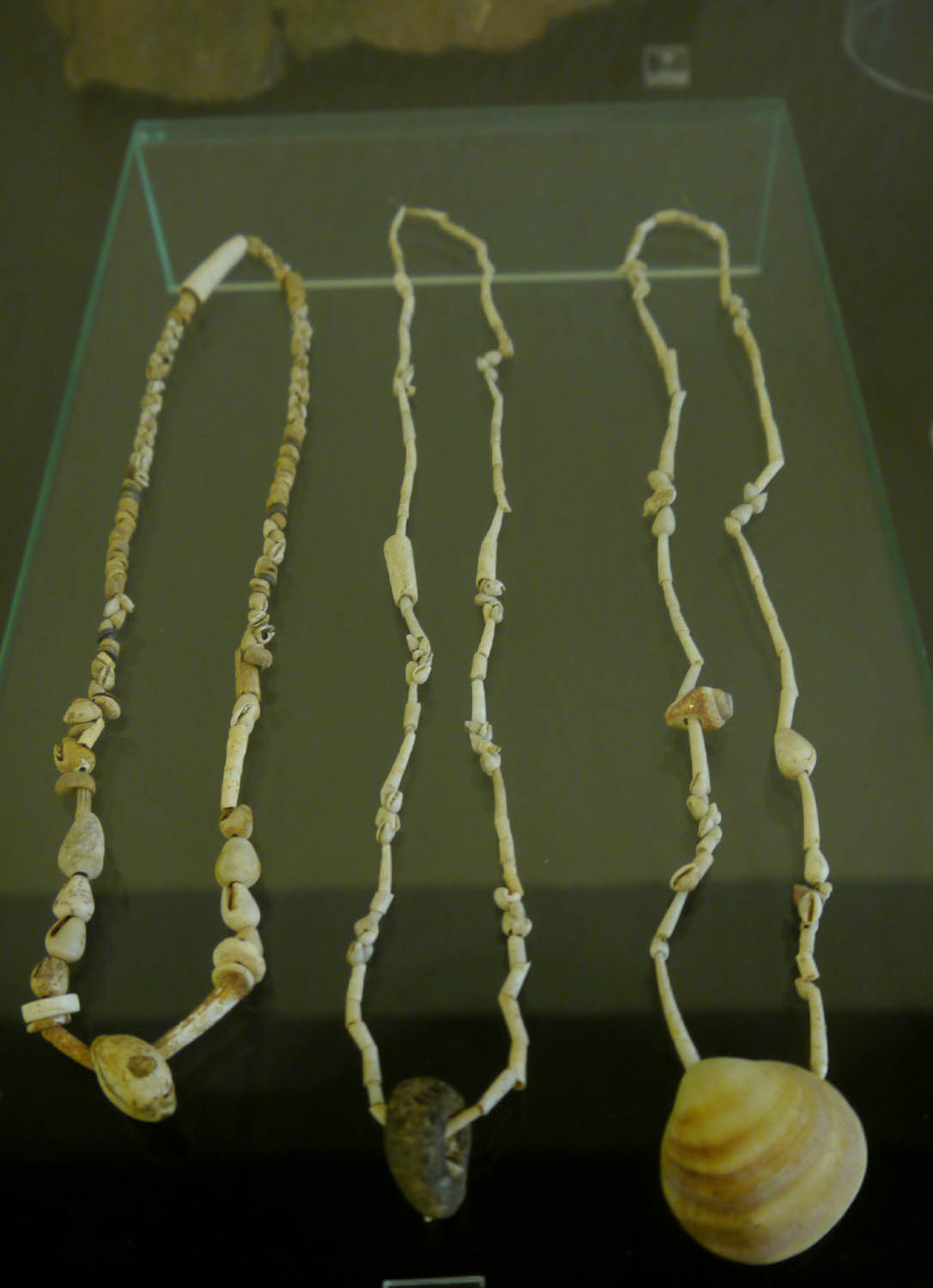
Necklace in the Archaeological Museum of Cartagena from the Marchamalo salt flats.

Human occupation of the area dates back to the Paleolithic; the most significant prehistoric site, Marchamalo salt flats (dated to the Copper Age), features circular huts and relied on fishing as its main activity. In Los Nietos there was a settlement and an necropolis of the Iberian people and Greek pottery was found.

== Ancient Era ==
On the other hand, there is more information about the Roman and Arab settlements. During the Roman era, the Mar Menor was called Palus and it hosted economic activity focused on the salting industry dedicated to the production of garum and maritime trade. It was also used as a harbor of refuge, including for large vessels, since at that time the depth was greater. The Arabs called it Al-Buhayrat al Qsar (the Albufera of the Alcázar), and in later Arab settlements, fishing devices known as encañizadas were built. These remain the only current example in the Mediterranean and can be found in San Pedro del Pinatar. They were placed in the “golas” or natural channels that connect the Mar Menor to the Mediterranean.

== Reconquista ==
In the thirteenth century, when Alfonso X conquered the Taifa of Murcia, he expelled the Muslims and encouraged nobles and knights from Aragón, Catalonia, and Murcia to settle in the area. The names of these families gave rise to place names for some population centers such as Torre-Pacheco, Roldán, or Lo Pagán.

The definitive boundaries between the Crown of Castile and the Crown of Aragon were established in 1305 with the Treaty of Elche, running near the Mar Menor and giving its name to the town of El Mojón.

Chroniclers of the time, such as the Libro de la montería, wrote about the abundance of fauna and the landscape of the Mar Menor. It is known that the wildlife was plentiful, especially deer and wild boar; Isla del Ciervo preserves the toponym of the animal that once lived there. Only a few shepherds and fishers inhabited the vicinity of the lagoon due to frequent raids by Barbary pirates from North Africa. To address this situation, Alfonso X decreed in 1266 that the inhabitants of Murcia would be obliged to help the coastal neighbors in the event of a Morisco landing. Those under attack sent smoke signals from the Torres de vigilancia costera (watchtowers) that would be relayed until they reached the tower of the Church of Santa Catalina, warning Murcians of attacks so they would go to the coast. Corsairs took prisoners and used them as slaves. When someone with financial means was captured, a ransom was demanded, often paid through a religious order such as the Mercedarians. The most notorious pirate in the Murcian coasts was Morato Arráez.

== Kingdom of Murcia ==
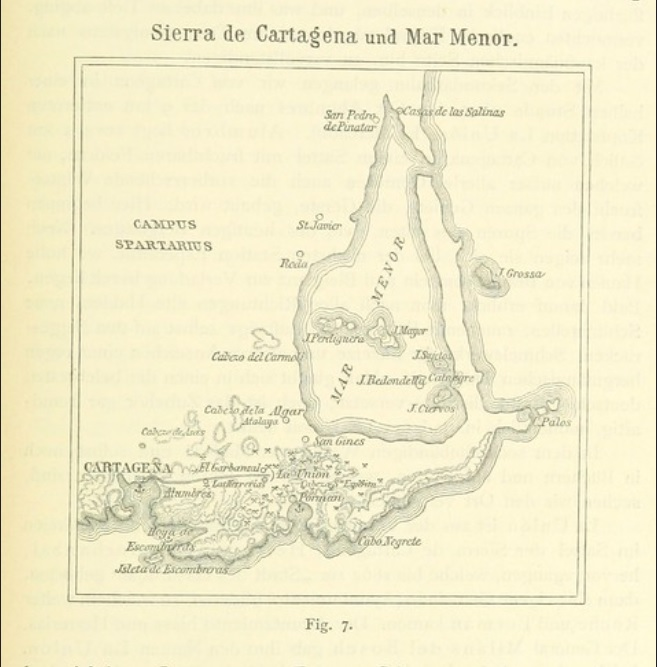
Map of the Cartagena–La Unión mining range and the Mar Menor

After the Reconquista of Granada, Barbary pirate attacks continued to plague the coast, which led to depopulation of the area because of the great insecurity faced by its inhabitants. Consequently, Charles V and Philip II ordered the construction of three watchtowers in La Manga and an additional one in Cabo de Palos. A tower was built in La Manga in the first half of the sixteenth century, but no remains survive today; older fishers still recall two bronze cannons that defended it from pirate attacks. This circular tower with a rainwater cistern was located in El Estacio, named San Miguel, and built with stone from the San Ginés de Orihuela road (between the Torre de la Horadada and Dehesa de Campoamor). Its solidity and proportions served as a model for those later erected along the Murcian coast.

In 1571, Philip II wished to build a larger fortification on Isla Grosa but eventually abandoned the plan due to the area's insecurity. Instead, the Torre de la Encañizada was constructed, some remains of which still exist. The towers of El Rame (in Los Alcázares) and El Negro (near Los Urrutias) are still standing.

Near the Mar Menor, the monasterio de San Ginés de la Jara was erected by the Franciscan Order in the sixteenth century.

== Modern Period ==
In the seventeenth century, Berber raids finally ended, and fishing in the lagoon had become a profitable business that sparked disputes between the councils of Cartagena and Murcia for its control. Their legal battles went so far that they had to be resolved at the highest level, culminating in the division of the Mar Menor into two demarcated zones.

The dawn of the nineteenth century saw the formation of two major municipalities in this comarca: San Javier and San Pedro del Pinatar; both belonged to the council of the city of Murcia until 1836. In 1862, the lighthouses of Islas Hormigas and El Estacio were built, and three years later, the Cabo de Palos lighthouse.

== Twentieth Century ==
At the beginning of the twentieth century, the area became a destination for many people from other parts of Murcia who came to take the “novenarios” (nine baths) during August. Thus, in 1904, the Hotel-Balneario La Encarnación was built in Los Alcázares, featuring thermal baths. Around this time, numerous summer residences for the middle class were also constructed, such as the Quinta de San Sebastián, the Palacio del Barón de Benifayó (both in San Pedro del Pinatar), the Chalet Barnuevo in Santiago de la Ribera, and the Casa del Barón on the Isla del Barón.

In 1927, construction began on an air-naval base in Santiago de la Ribera to provide strategic protection for the fleet stationed at the port of Cartagena. Building the base took several years. In 1943, the San Javier air base became home to the Academia General del Aire. In 1929, the Murcia–San Javier Airport was also opened; it is a military base of the Spanish Air Force that operated as a public airport managed by Aena until January 14, 2019.

In the Spanish Civil War Mar Menor stayed with the Spanish Republican Government until almost the end of the war due to its closeness to the Republican stronghold and Spanish Republican Navy base of Cartagena.

In the twentieth century, urbanization of La Manga del Mar Menor began. In 1956, Tomás Maestre Aznar, a lawyer and businessman, managed to convince his uncle Tomás Maestre Zapata to sell him all of his rights in La Manga Norte; after various disputes with other relatives and with José Celdrán, owner of La Manga Sur, he gained full ownership of the coastal strip.

In 1956, under the autarky regime, Spain's economy was near collapse. To avoid bankruptcy, the Franco regime brought in so-called “tecnócratas,” who implemented the Stabilization Plan. This led to the enactment of the 1963 Law on Centers and Areas of National Tourist Interest.

Once Maestre had consolidated control over the area and secured financing, he began drafting initial urbanization plans for this strip in 1961, with support from the municipalities of San Javier and Cartagena (which share jurisdiction over La Manga) and from the Murcia Tourism Delegation. The project gained momentum after a visit by Minister of Tourism Manuel Fraga in early 1963.

In 1963, the area became a Center of Tourist Interest, losing any type of protection, and Maestre, after resolving financial and water-supply issues, began construction on the Los Cubanitos development, the Hotel Entremares—the first hotel, built in 1966—and Galúa, as well as bungalows. Through connections in Francoist circles, the developer obtained more than 11,000 million pesetas in soft state loans between 1966 and 1975 for La Manga.

By the mid-1970s, amid the 1973 oil crisis and its economic impact, the envisioned tourism model did not materialize, causing the land to be fragmented and initiatives to be undertaken by numerous entrepreneurs.

Los Alcázares separated from San Javier and Torre Pacheco in 1983.

With the arrival of democracy, the Congress of Deputies approved the 1988 Coastal Law, which declared the first hundred meters of coastline from the waterline as “public domain not subject to development.” This set the stage for conflict between developers, the regional government, and the municipalities of Cartagena and San Javier.

Ultimately, uncontrolled urban development led to the disappearance of beaches and had disastrous environmental consequences. Untreated wastewater was discharged for years, adding to the pressure from tourism. Moreover, between 1974 and 1975, to allow larger ships to enter the Tomás Maestre marina, the Estacio canal was widened. This caused a drop in the salinity of the Mar Menor, allowing Mediterranean species to colonize the lagoon. Parts of the lagoon were also dried out, resulting in the loss of fishing areas.
