= Marchamalo salt flats =

Protected areas in Murcia, Spain

Coordinates: 37°38′06″N 0°43′12″W

Location of the Marchamalo salt flats and Las Amoladeras Beach within the protected areas of the Campo de Cartagena. Numbers 11 and 12 on the map.

The Marchamalo salt flats (197.8 hectares) and the Las Amoladeras Beach (116 ha) are two small protected areas located at the southern tip of La Manga del Mar Menor, in the municipality of Cartagena in the Region of Murcia, near the Mar Menor and Cabo de Palos.

As protected sites, they are included among the so-called Espacios abiertos e islas del Mar Menor, holding the status of Natural park, SCI and SPA.

== Plant species ==
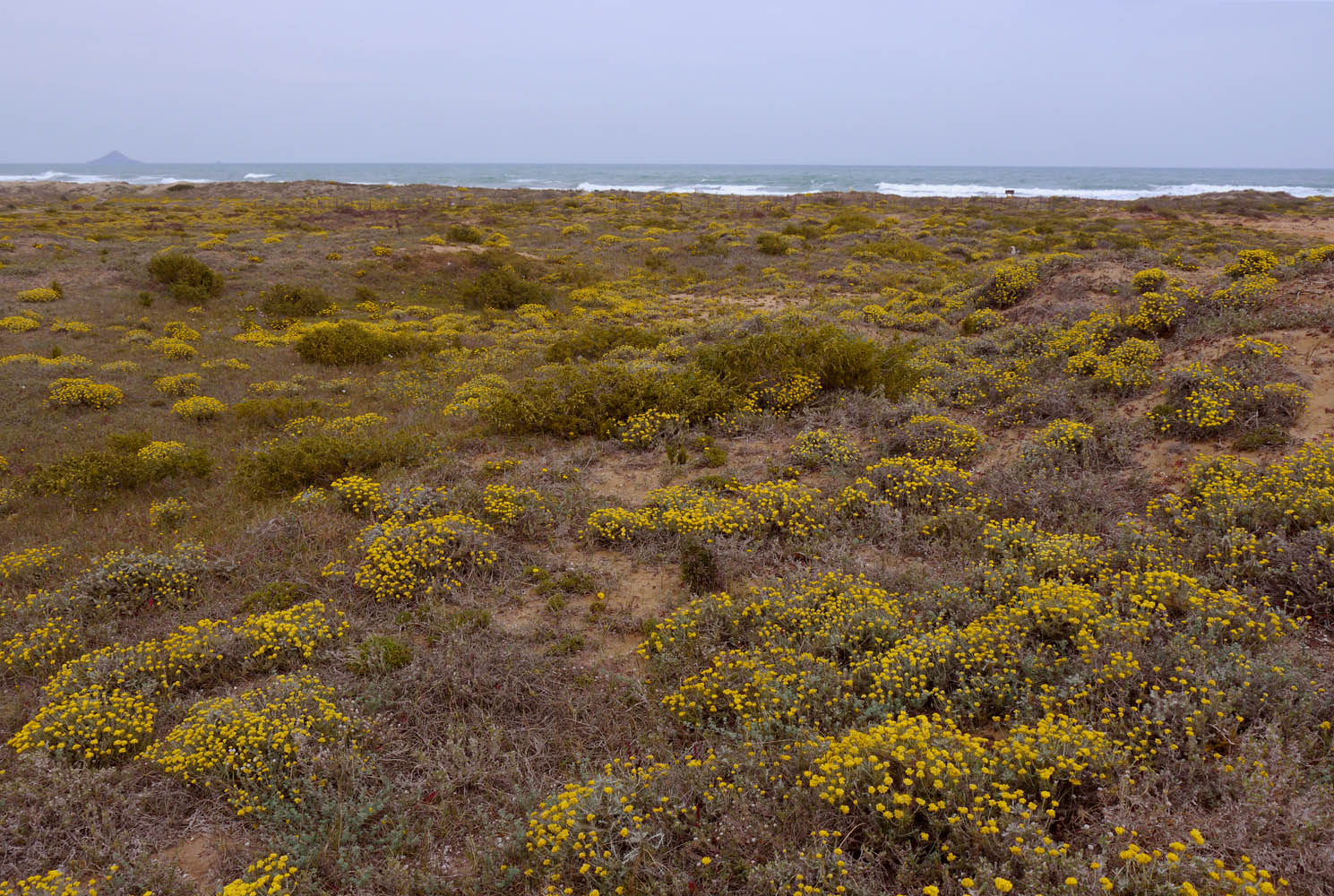
View of the dunes at Las Amoladeras Beach in March

=== Dune vegetation ===
Las Amoladeras Beach protects a small remnant of the former dune vegetation that once covered all of La Manga del Mar Menor, featuring species typical of these ecosystems such as sea trefoil (Lotus creticus), marram grass (Ammophila arenaria), yellow everlasting (Helichrysum stoechas), sea daffodil (Pancratium maritimum) and sea holly (Eryngium maritimum).

In 2010, environmental restoration work was carried out at Las Amoladeras, including the removal of invasive species—mainly acacias and agaves—and the planting of numerous specimens of dune juniper (Juniperus turbinata), which had disappeared from the area ages ago, as well as mastic (Pistacia lentiscus). A few examples of large-fruited juniper (Juniperus macrocarpa) from older reforestations can also be found here.

=== Halophytic saltmarsh vegetation ===
In the vicinity of the Marchamalo salt flats, one finds halophytic vegetation typical of saltmarshes and saline depressions, such as glasswort (Salicornia fruticosa), sea lavender (Limonium cossonianum) or shrubby seablight (Suaeda vera). Especially notable are a few specimens of Mar Menor asparagus (Asparagus macrorrhizus), an endemic species of the lagoon area and critically endangered. In the Cabo de Palos area, the saltmarsh species almarjo (Halocnemum strobilaceum) was recorded in the early 20th century, though it is currently extinct in this region.

== Fauna ==
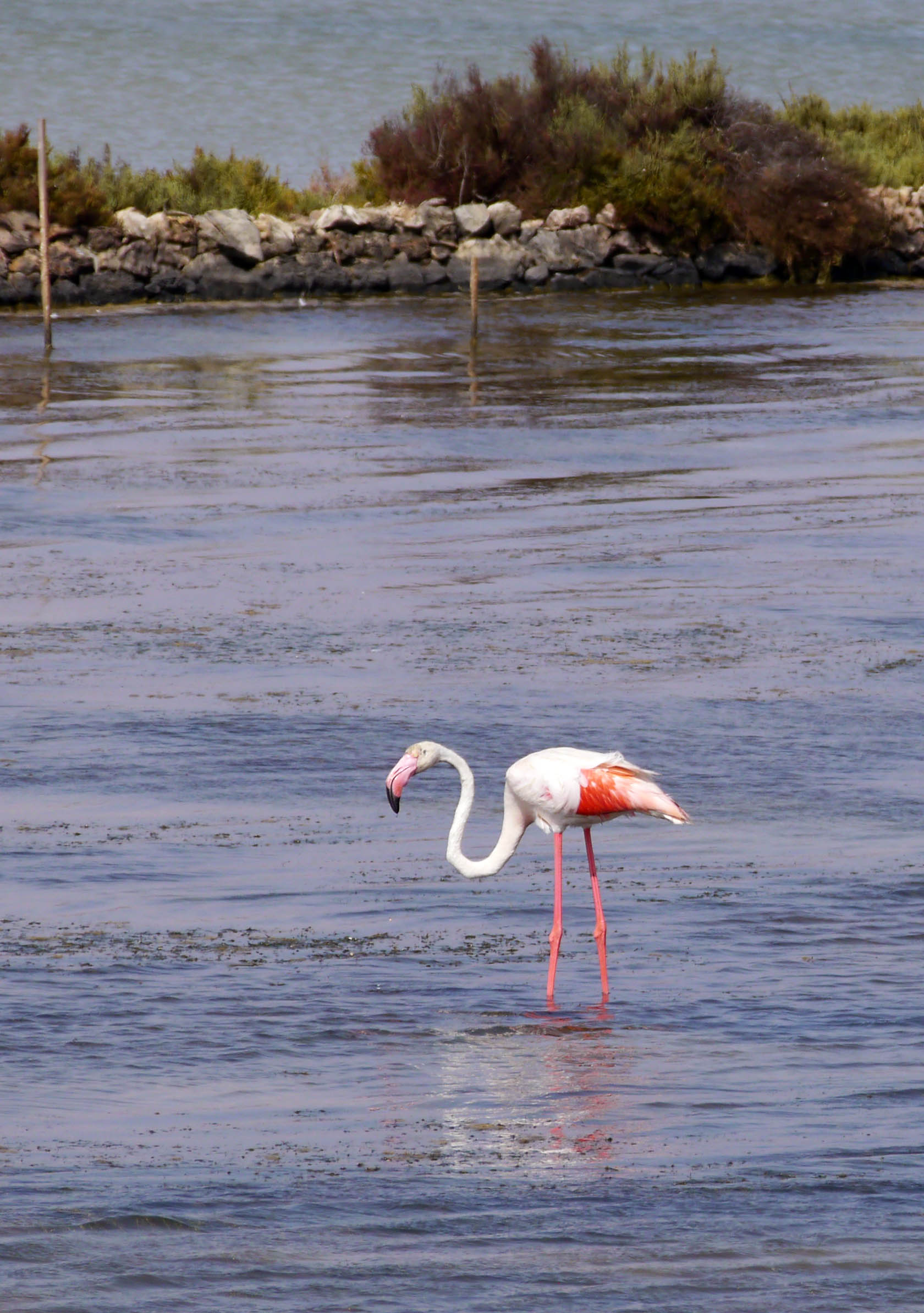
Greater flamingo (Phoenicopterus roseus) at the Marchamalo salt flats

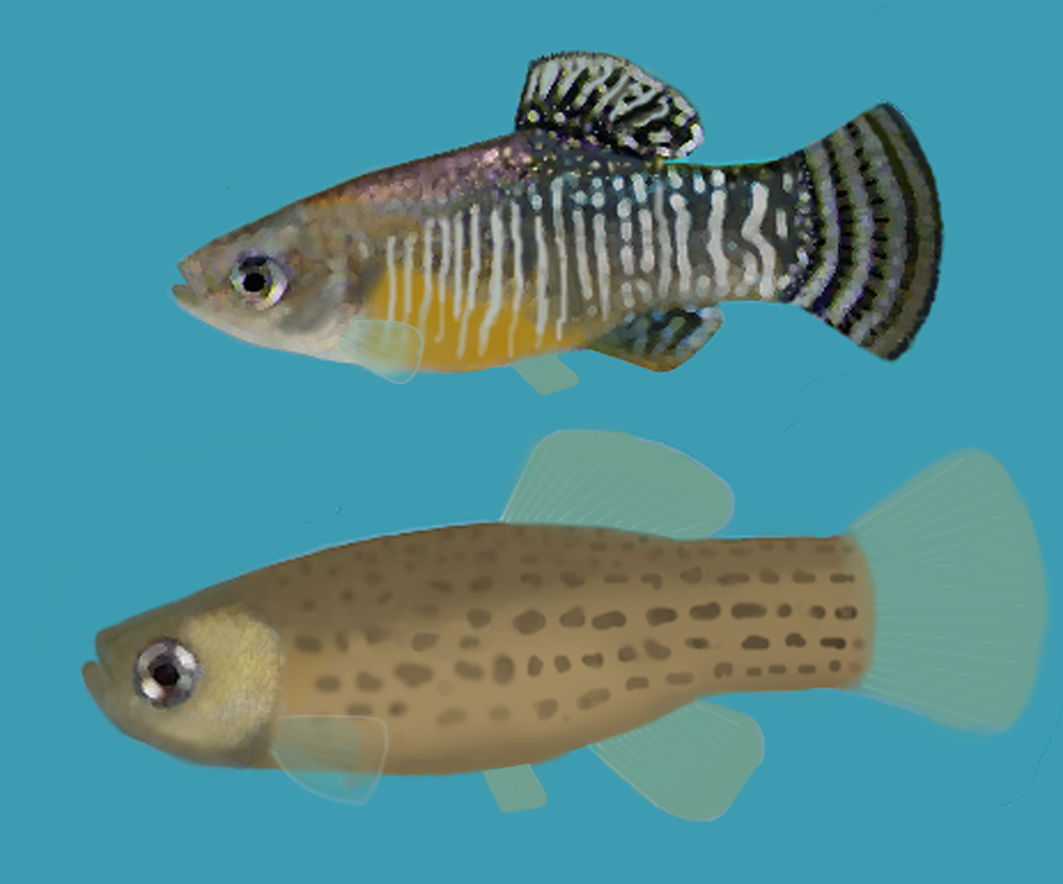
Male (top) and female (bottom) fartet

The Marchamalo salt flats are home to the endemic fish fartet (Aphanius iberus), native to the southeast and classified as endangered.

They also support populations of various waterbirds, such as the greater flamingo (Phoenicopterus roseus), the Audouin's gull (Larus audouinii), the little egret (Egretta garzetta), the black-winged stilt (Himantopus himantopus), the pied avocet (Recurvirostra avosetta) and the Kentish plover (Charadrius alexandrinus).

== Photo gallery ==
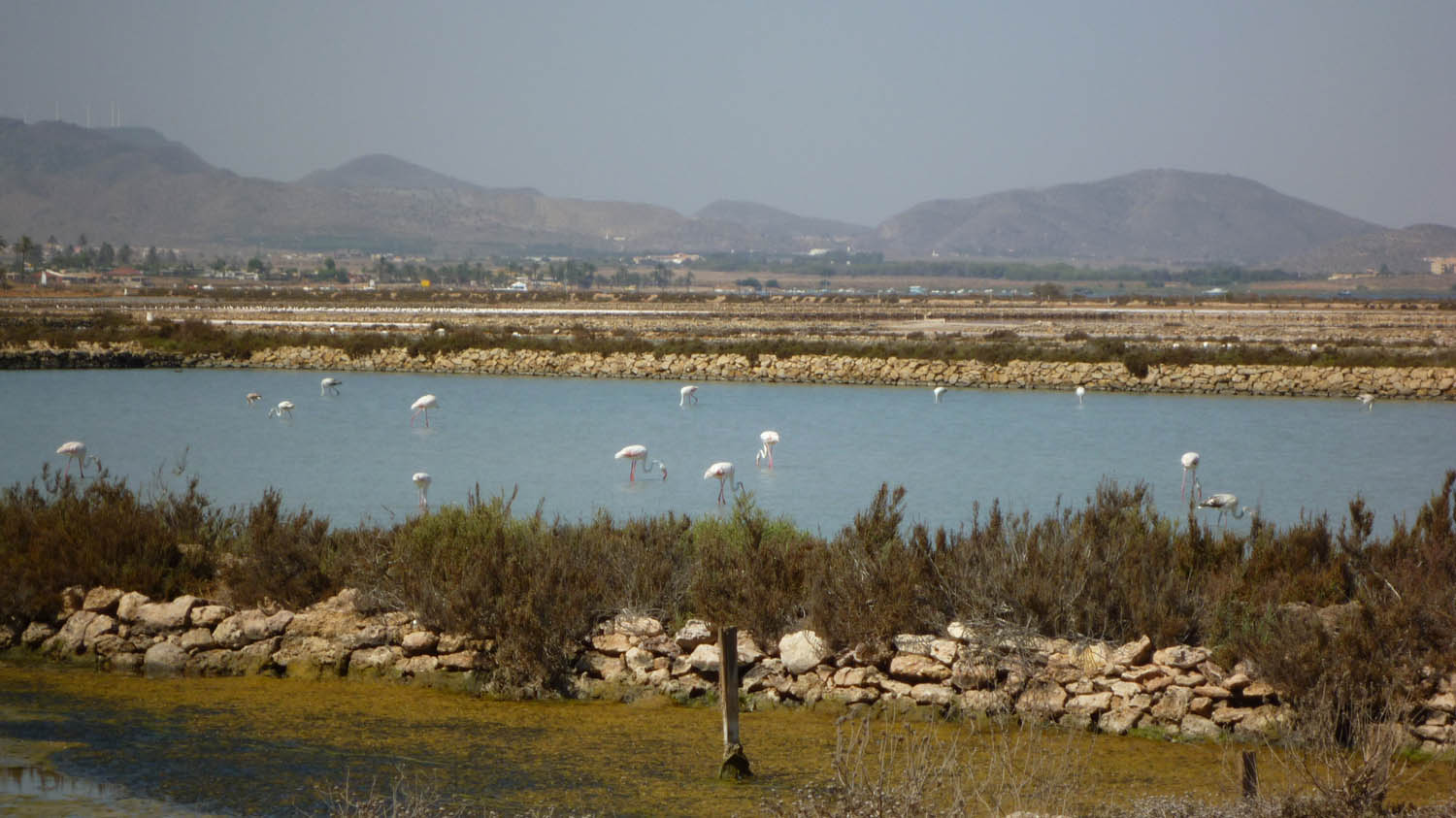
View of the Marchamalo salt flats with flamingos

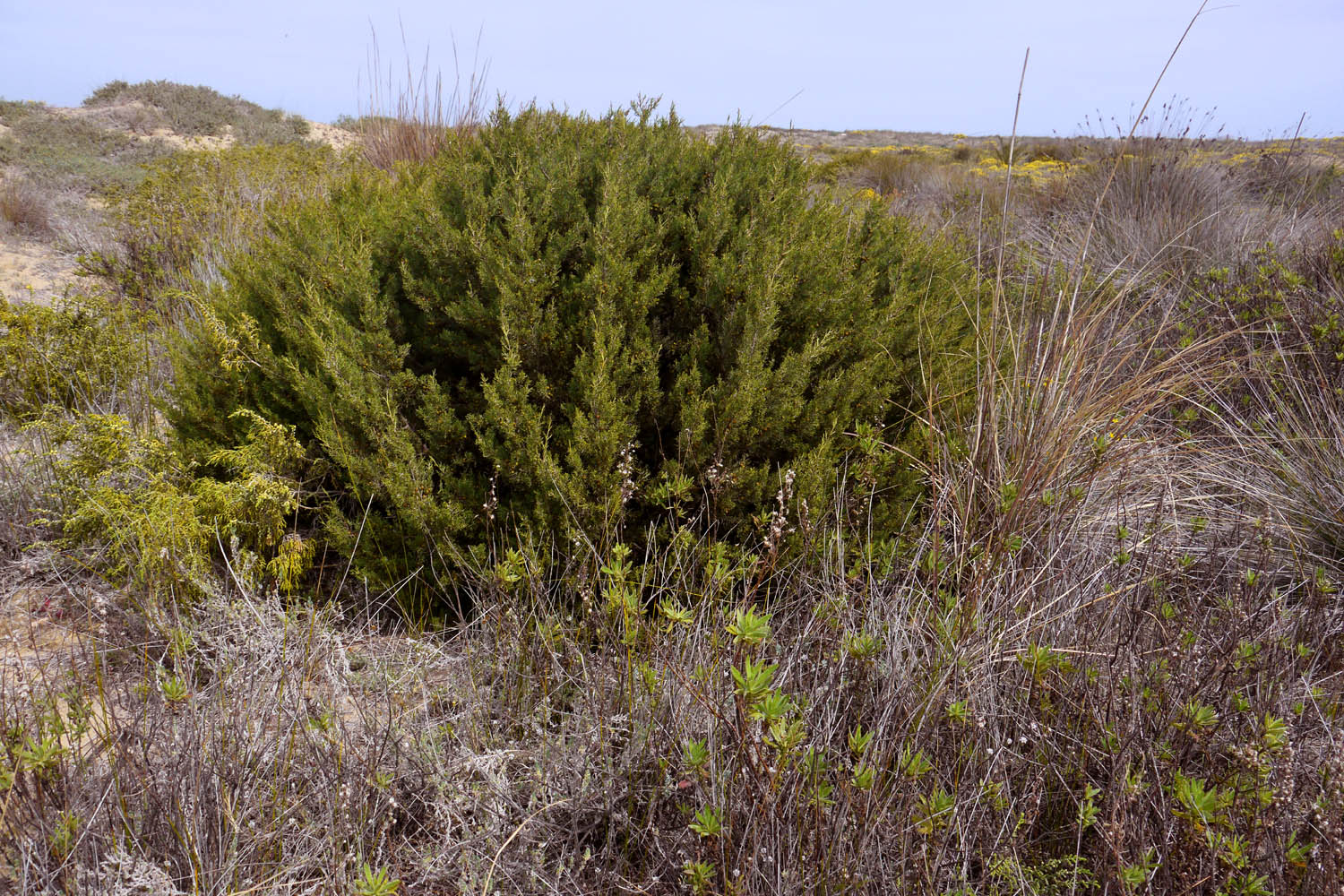
Dune juniper reforestation at Las Amoladeras Beach

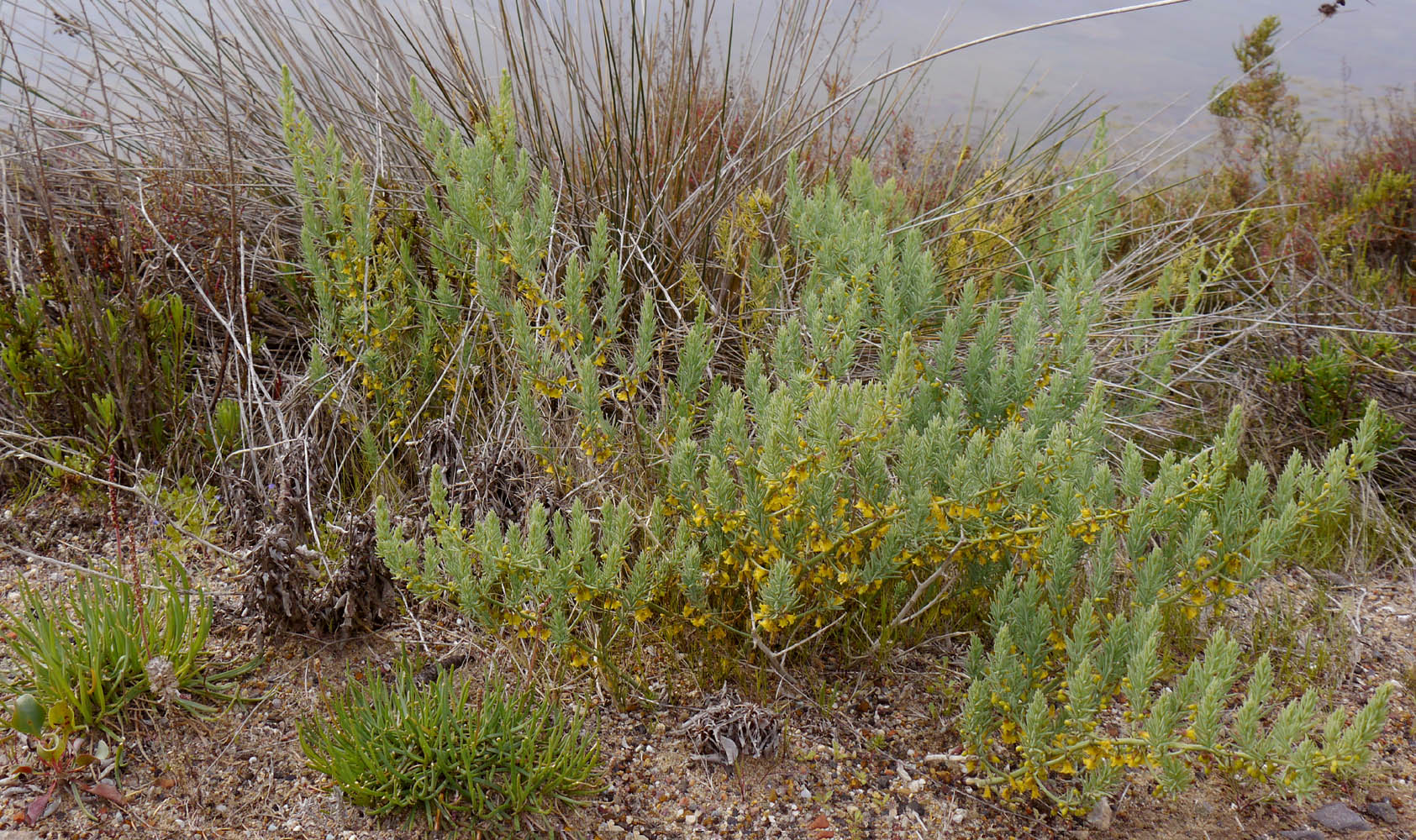
Mar Menor asparagus, critically endangered

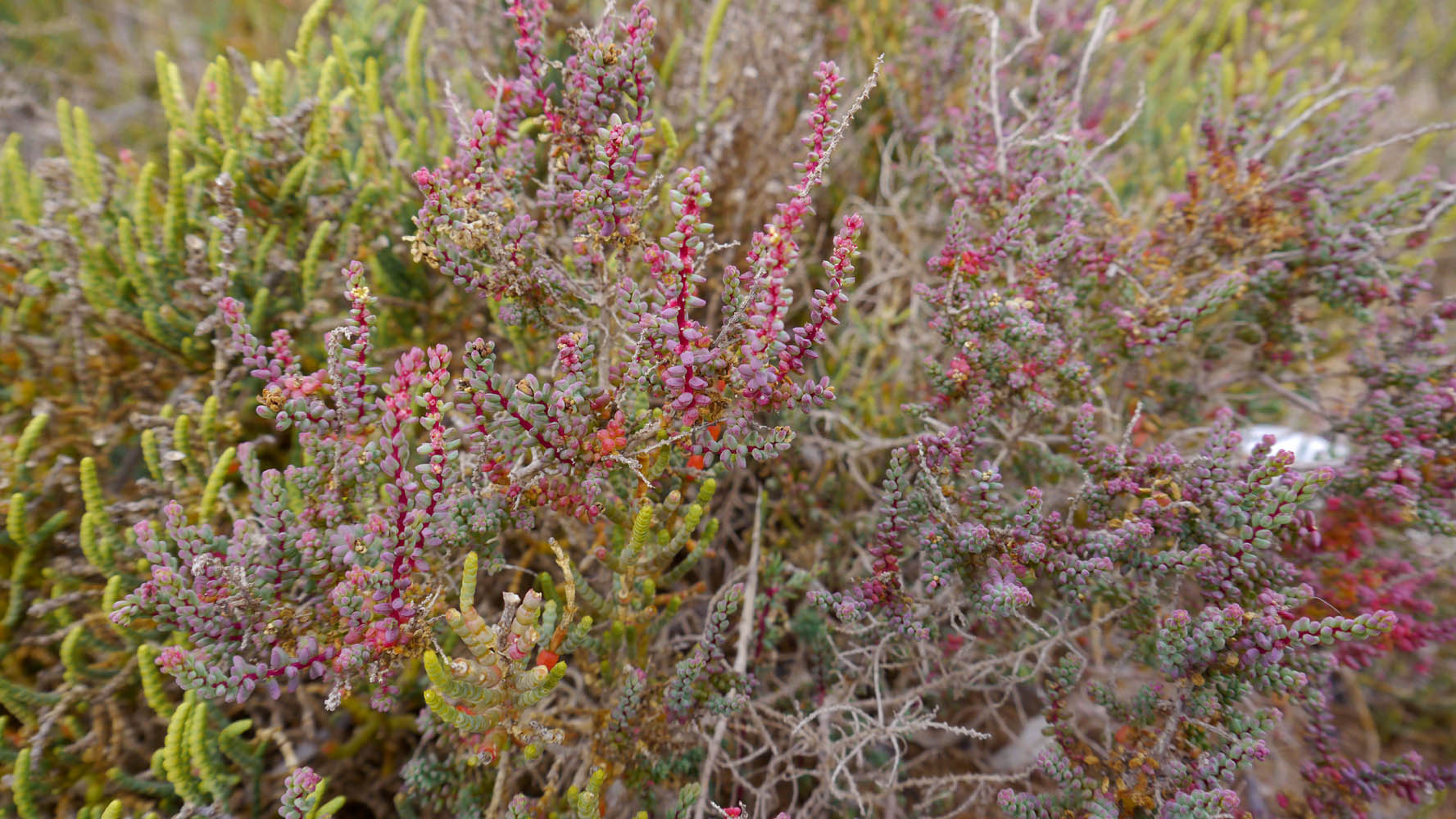
Shrubby seablight

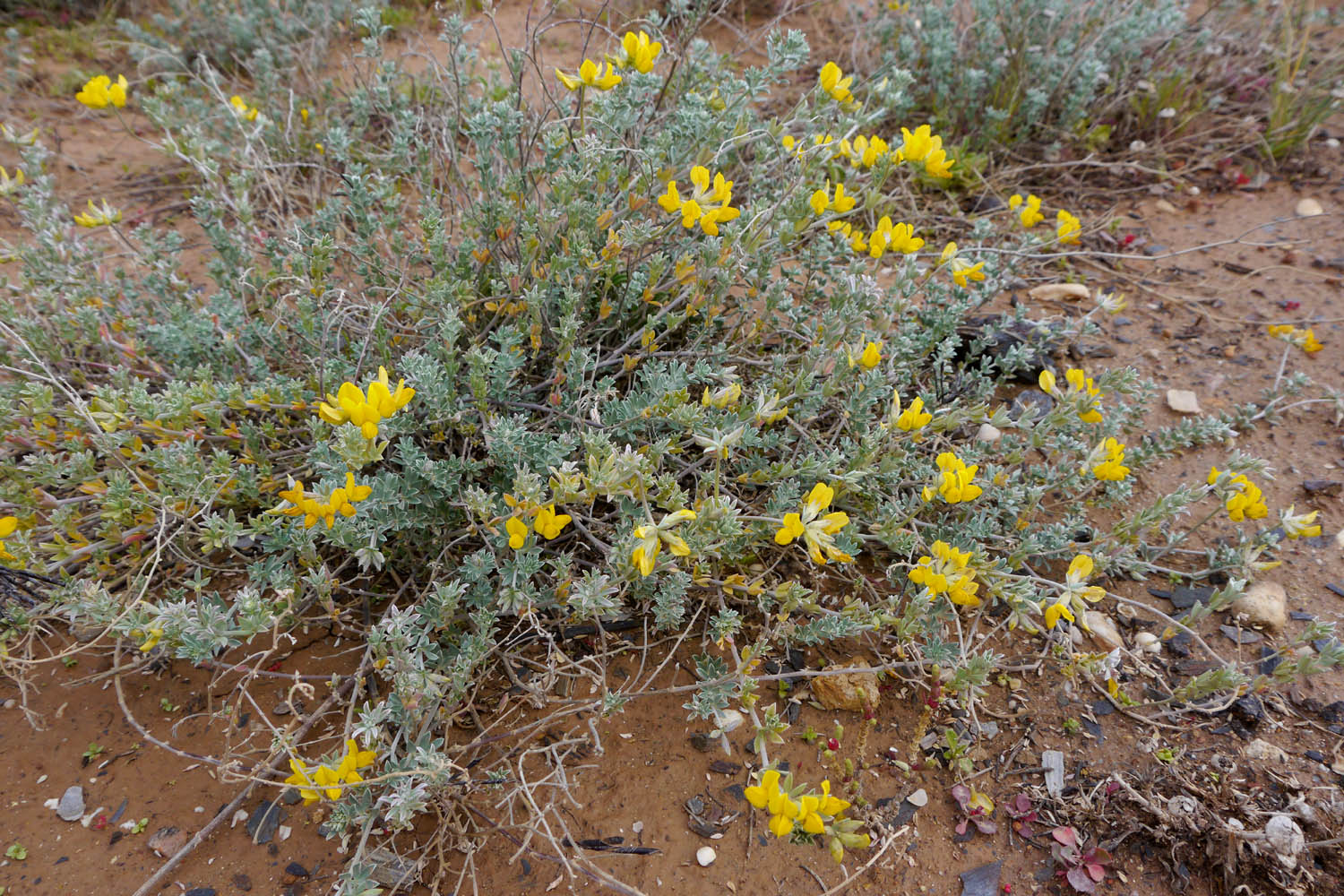
Sea trefoil

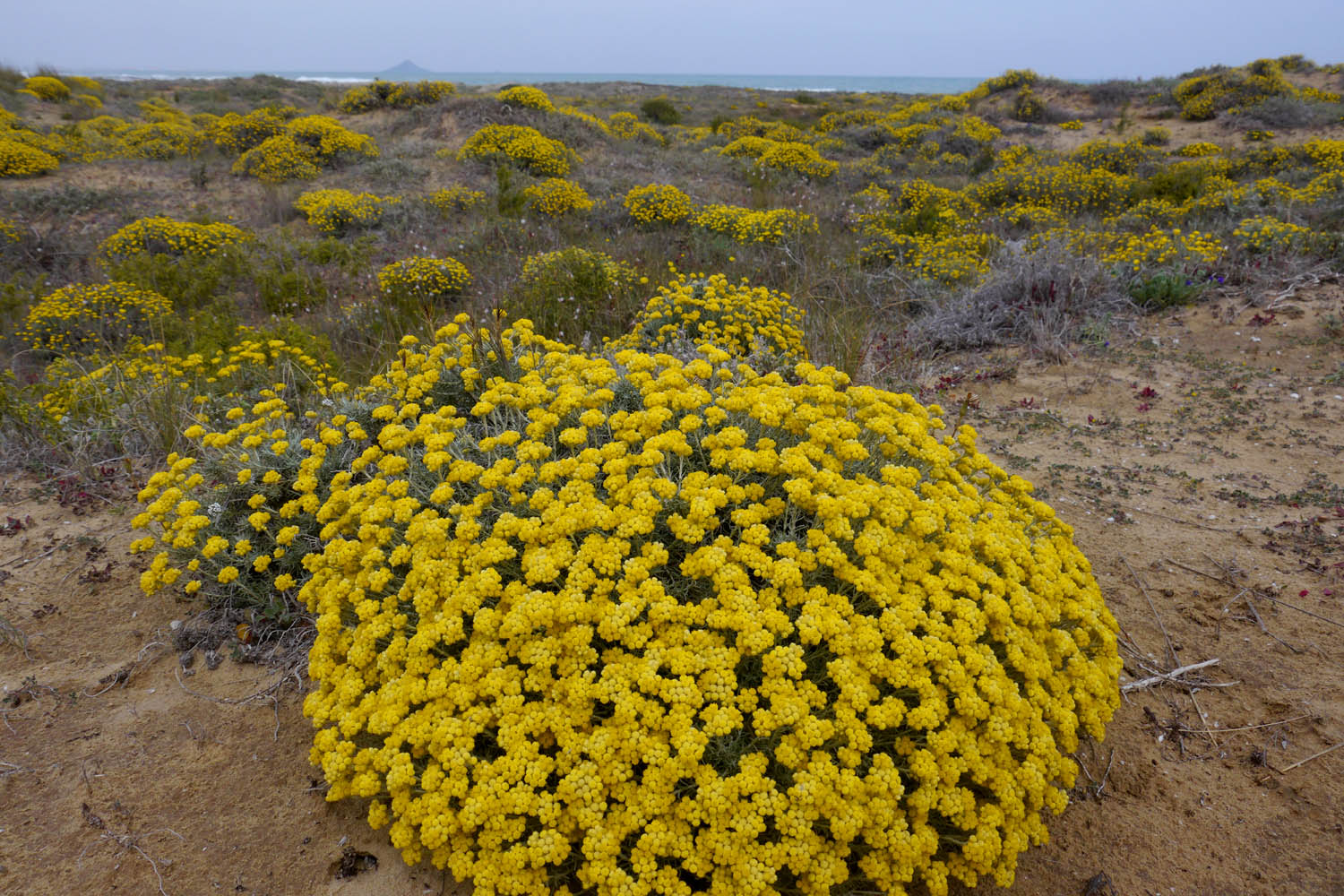
Yellow everlasting (Helichrysum stoechas) at Las Amoladeras

== Archaeological remains ==
A prehistoric settlement has been documented and excavated at Las Amoladeras Beach, dating from the end of the Neolithic and the Copper Age, between 2500 and 1800 BC. According to Professor García del Toro, this settlement consisted of a series of circular huts surrounded by a fortified wall, similar to the one found at Cabezo del Plomo in Mazarrón. It was inhabited by a society of hunters and gatherers focused on fishing and shellfishing. Some artifacts from excavations carried out here can be seen at the Cartagena Archaeological Museum. Since 1987, it has been declared a Site of Cultural Interest (BIC).

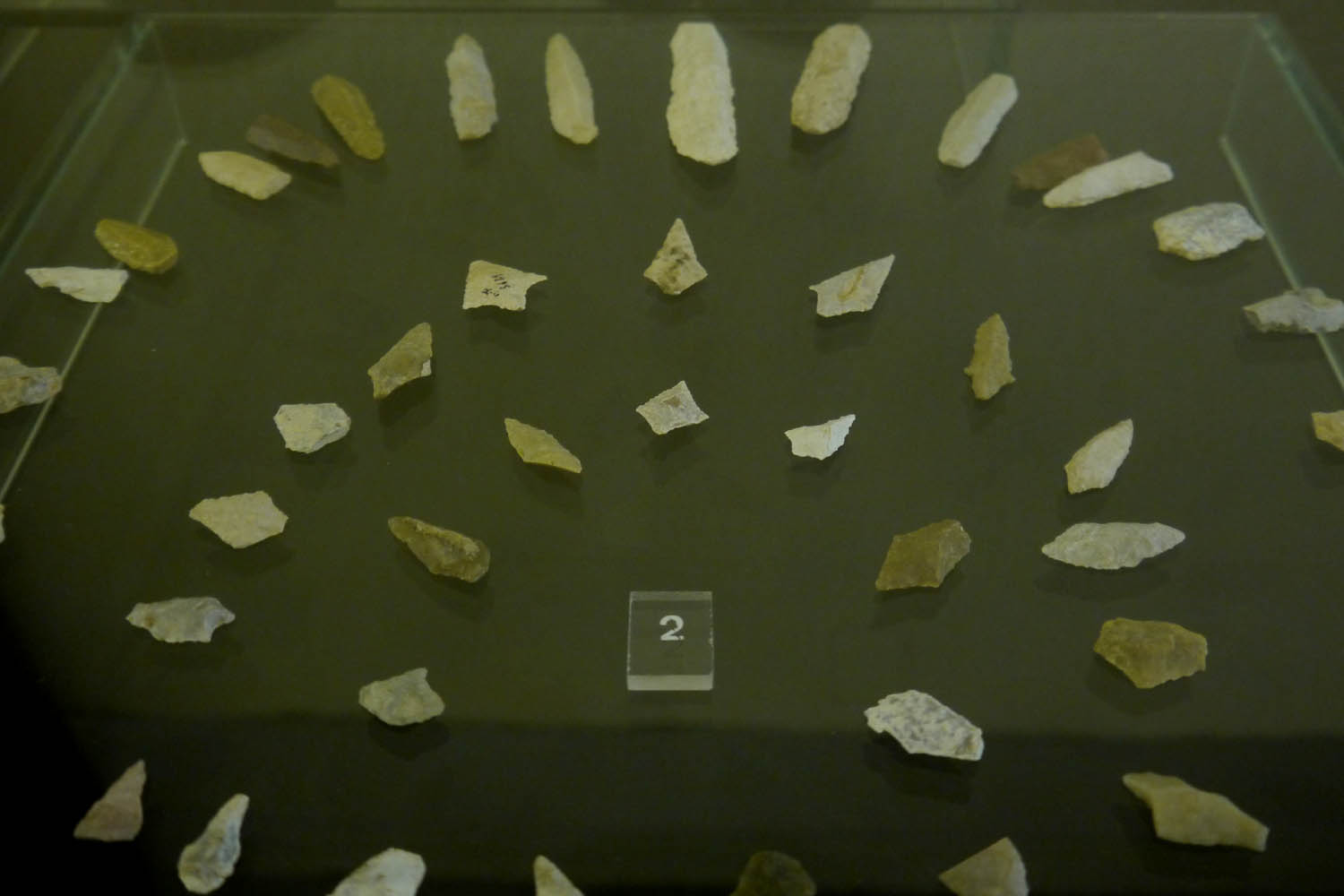
Neolithic arrowheads. Museo Arqueológico Municipal de Cartagena.

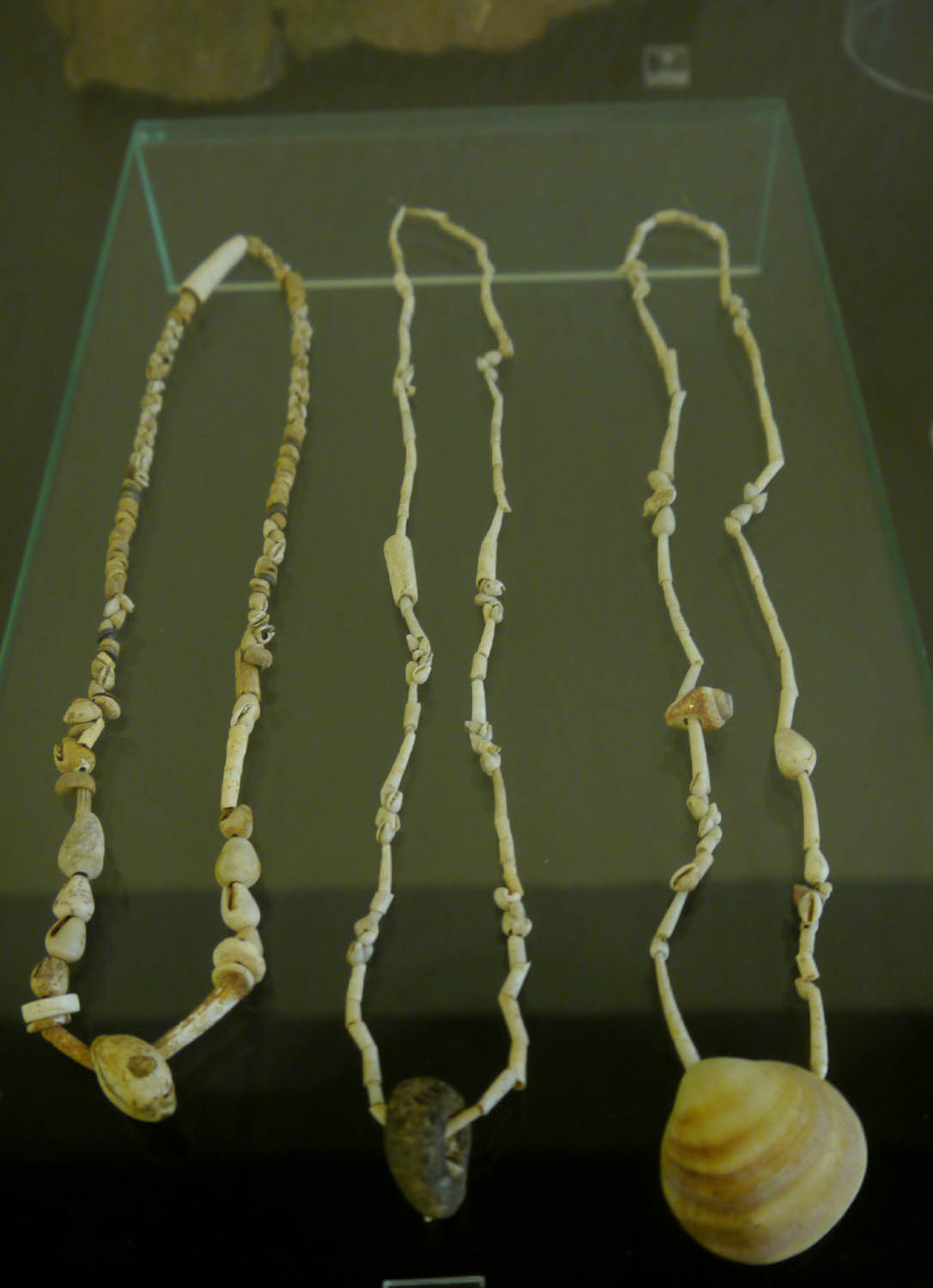
Neolithic necklaces. Museo Arqueológico Municipal de Cartagena.
