= Mar Menor Protected Landscape =

Protected area in Spain

Open Spaces and Islands of the Mar Menor
- IUCN category V (protected landscape/seascape)
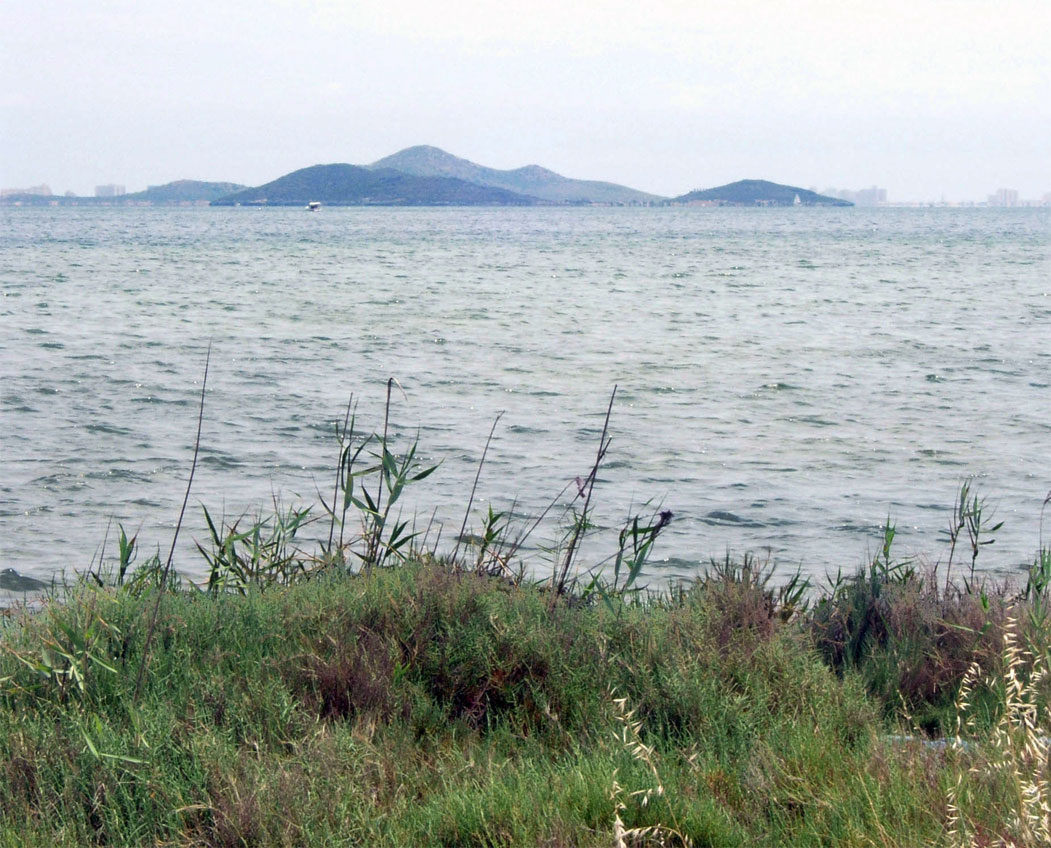
- View of the Perdiguera and Mayor Islands.
- Location: Region of Murcia, Spain
- Nearest city: Los Alcázares La Unión
- Area: 1,186.1 ha (2,931 acres)
- Established: 1992
- Governing body: Government of Murcia

The Mar Menor Protected Landscape (Espacios abiertos e islas del Mar Menor in Spanish, Open Spaces and Islands of the Mar Menor) are a series of protected areas situated in the Mar Menor, the "little sea" in the Region of Murcia and part of the Natura 2000 network. They are listed as a Site of Community Importance (LIC). They extend across three coastal municipalities of this inland sea: Cartagena (1038.5 ha), San Javier (119.6 ha), and Los Alcázares (28 ha).

== Islands ==
These protected spaces include five volcanic-origin islands:

- Isla Mayor (also known as Isla del Barón), the largest at 93.8 hectares and 104 meters in altitude (No. 1 on the map).
- Isla Perdiguera, the most visited, covering 25.8 hectares (No. 2 on the map).
- Isla del Ciervo with 16.3 hectares, which until recently was connected to La Manga by an artificial causeway that has now been removed (No. 9).
- Isla Rondella, one of the smallest (No. 10).
- Isla del Sujeto, also very small at 2.4 hectares (No. 10).

== Coastline ==
Map of the protected areas of the Campo de Cartagena

Additionally, within the municipality of Cartagena along the Mar Menor coastline, the following areas are protected:

- El Carmolí (remnants of an extinct quaternary volcano) (No. 5).
- Cabezo San Ginés (a limestone hill featuring Karst formations) (No. 7).
- Playa de Las Amoladeras (No. 12).
- The Saladar de Lo Poyo (No. 6).
- The Marina del Carmolí (No. 4).
- The Marchamalo salt flats (No. 11).
- The Cabezo del Sabinar (No. 8).

In the municipality of Los Alcázares:

The Playa de la Hita (No. 3)

In July 2020, under the "Ley de recuperación y protección del Mar Menor", seven new wetlands surrounding the lagoon were added to the protected area:

Saladar de Los Urrutias.

The mouth of the Rambla de la Carrasquilla (known as Punta Lengua de la Vaca).

- Saladar de Punta de Las Lomas.
- Punta del Pudrimel.
- The lagoons of Cabezo Beaza.
- The lagoon of Los Alcázares.
- The lagoons of El Algar.

These spaces aim to protect the unique lagoon environments essential for species such as the endemic fish fartet. They also safeguard the geological processes involved in the formation of these areas, given their high ecological and natural interest.

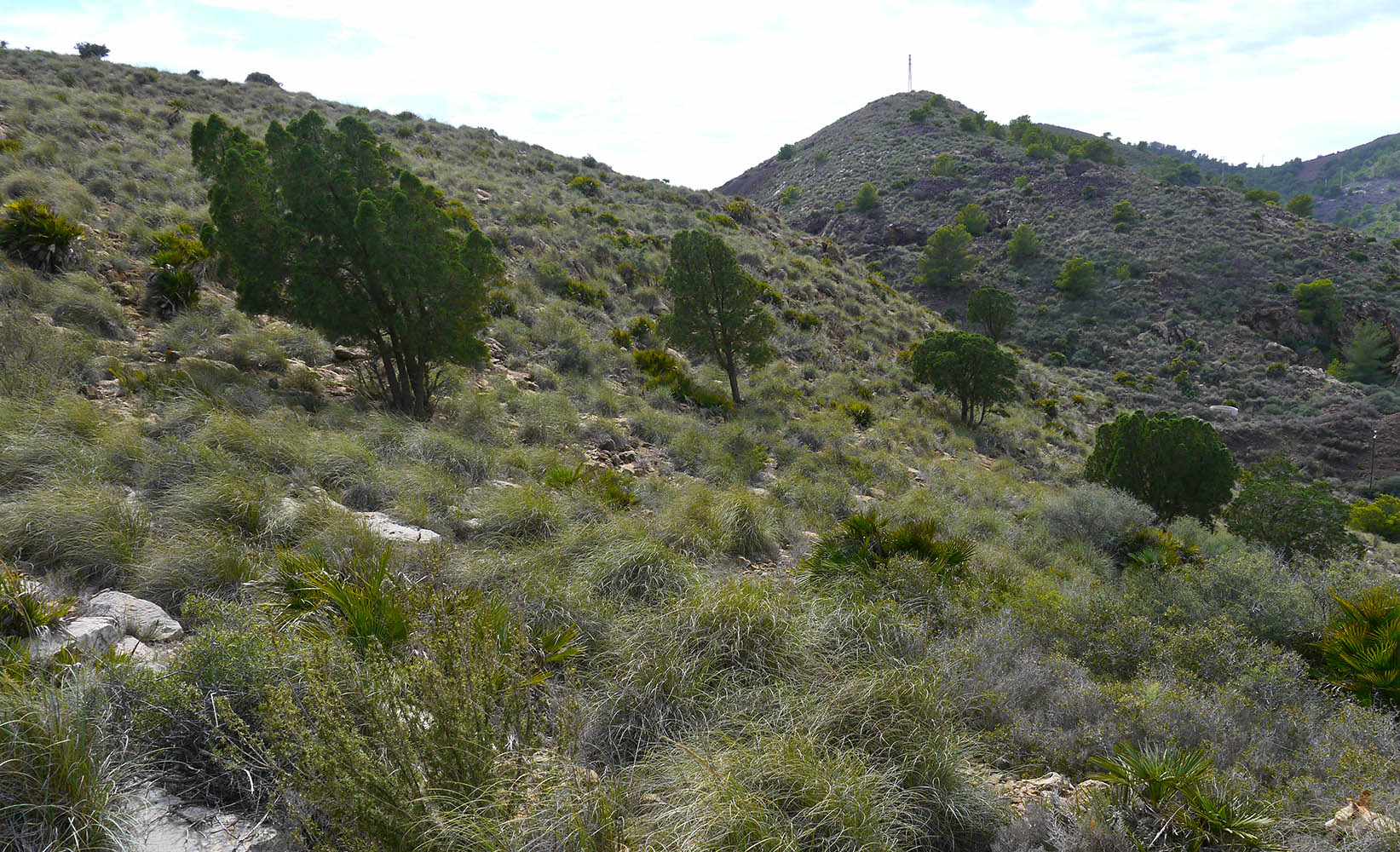
Specimens of Tetraclinis articulata (known locally as Cartagena cypress) in the Cabezo del Sabinar.

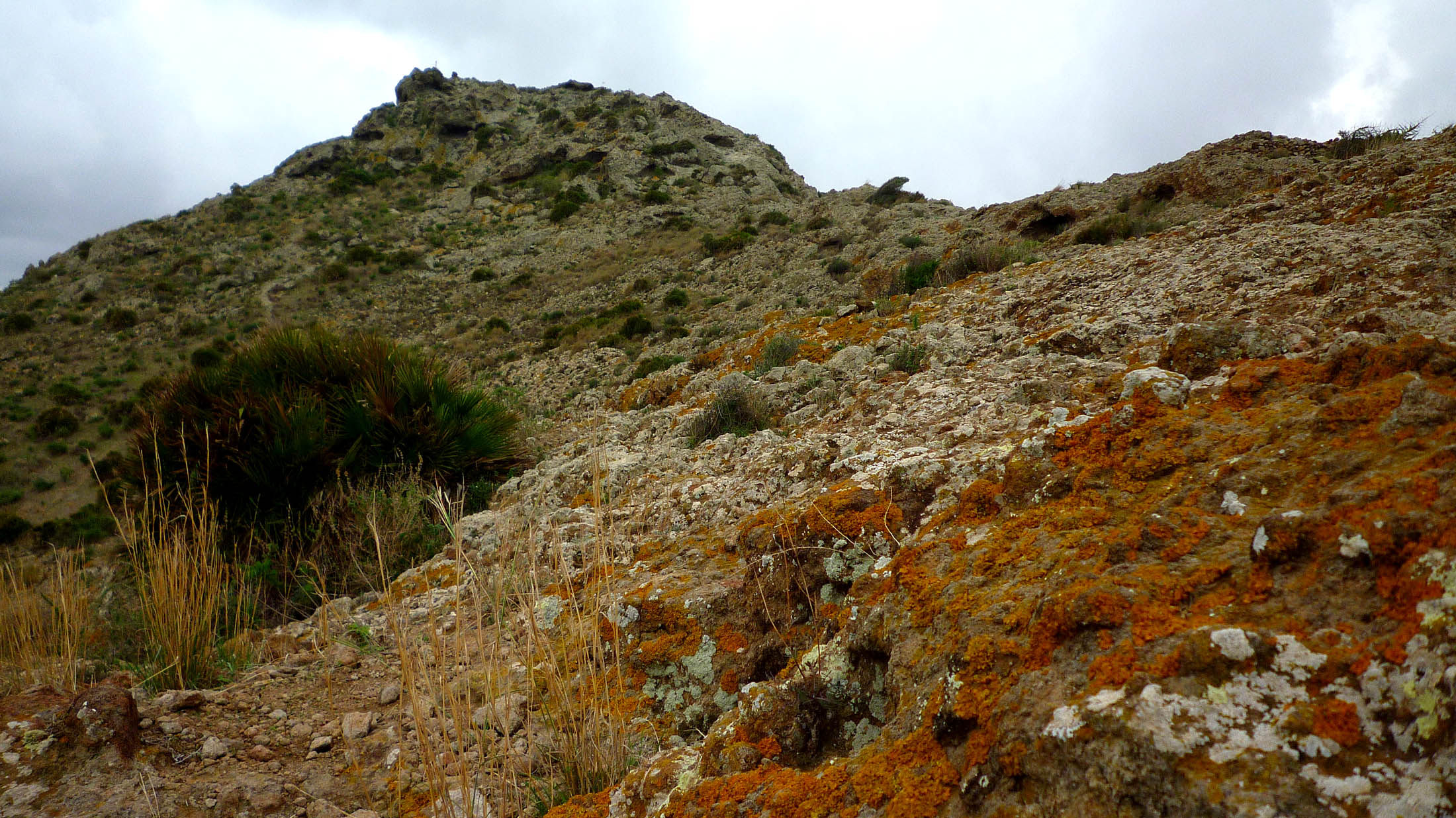
Volcanic hill of El Carmolí.

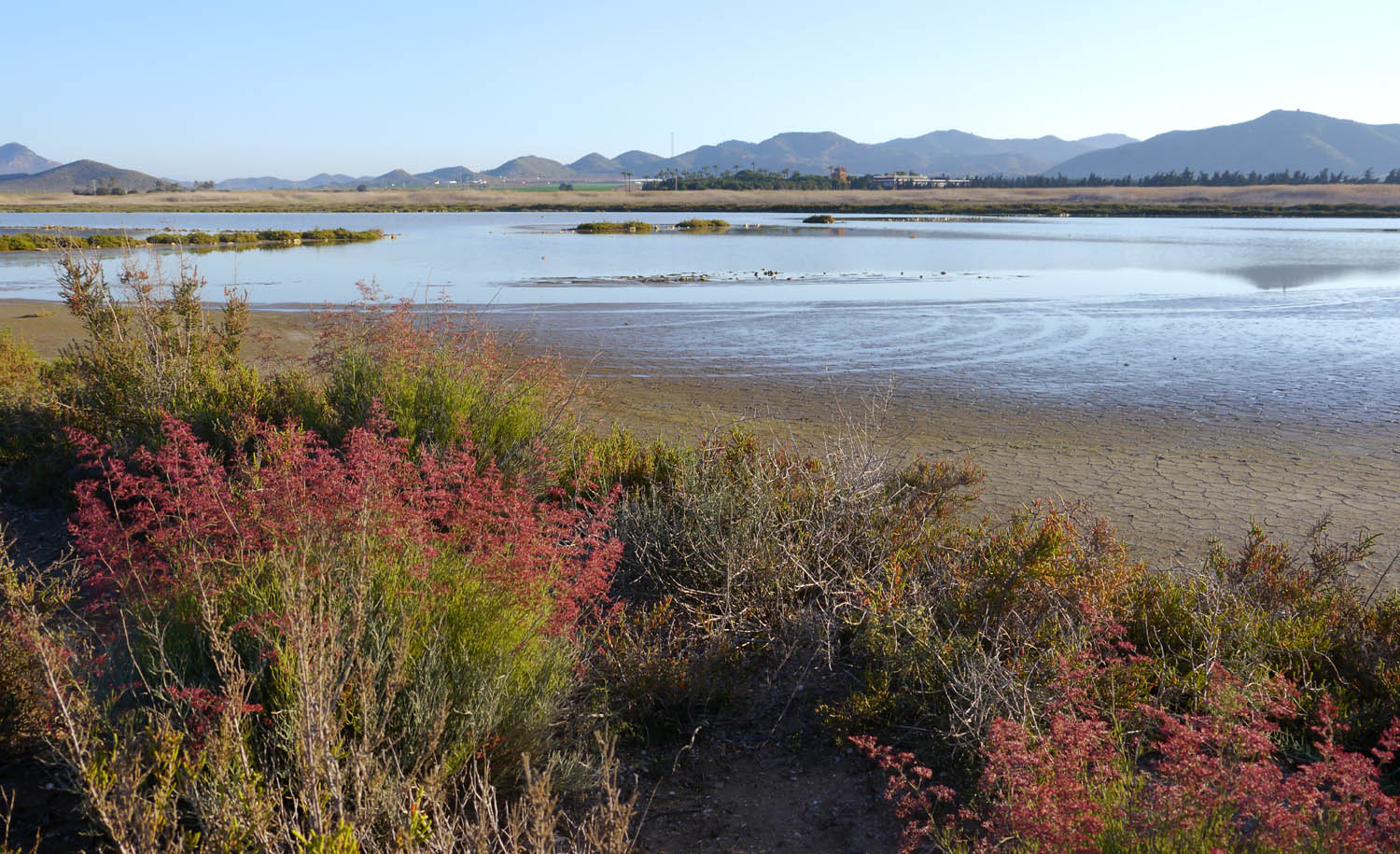
Abandoned salt flats of Lo Poyo.

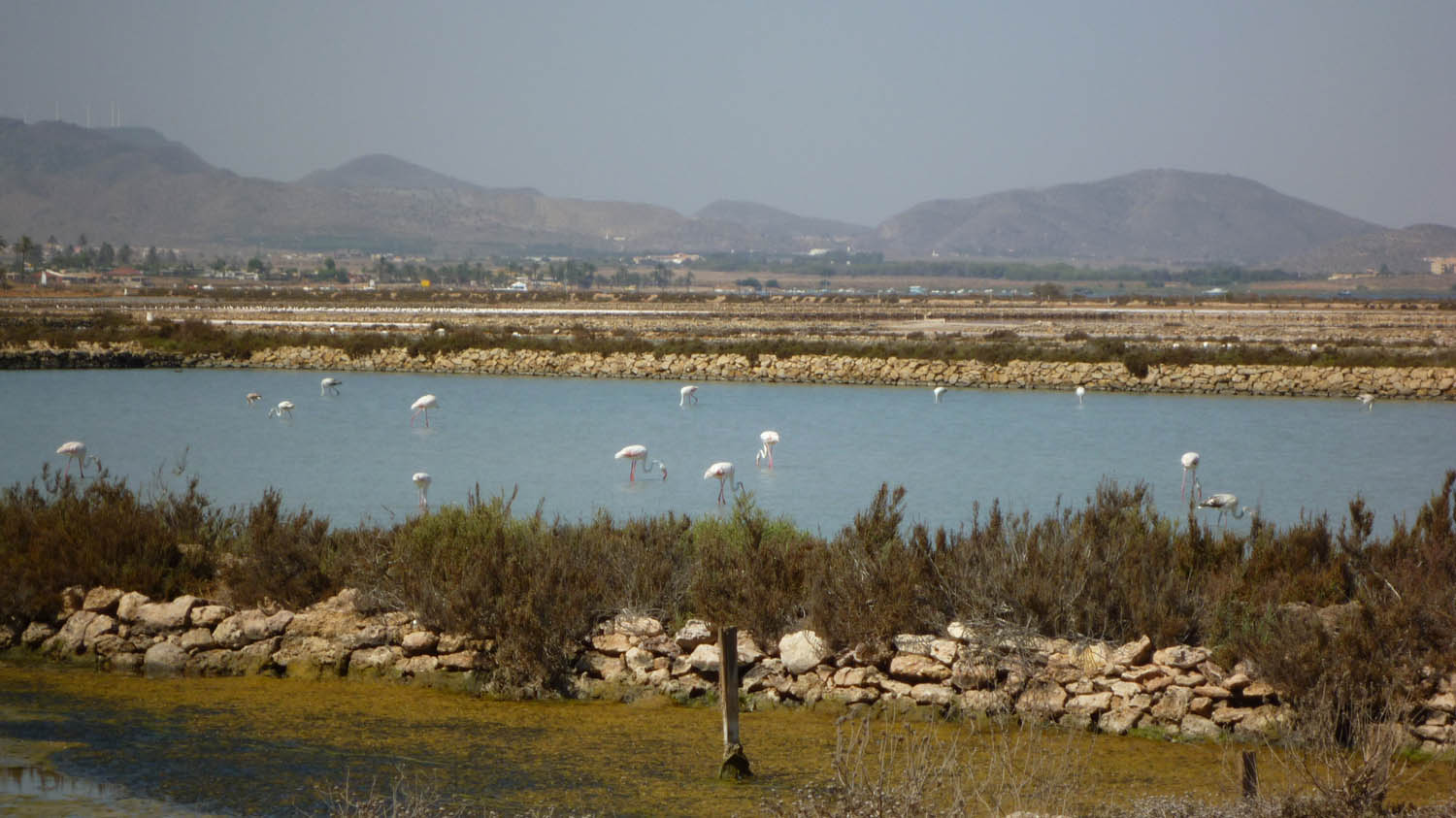
Phoenicopterus roseus (greater flamingos) in the Salinas de Marchamalo.

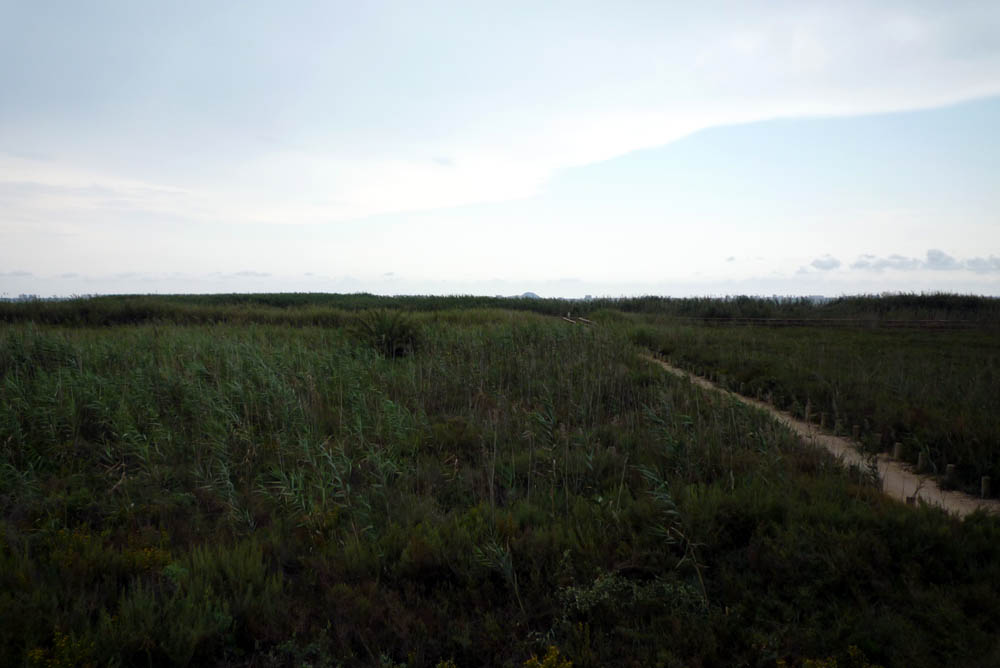
Playa de la Hita.

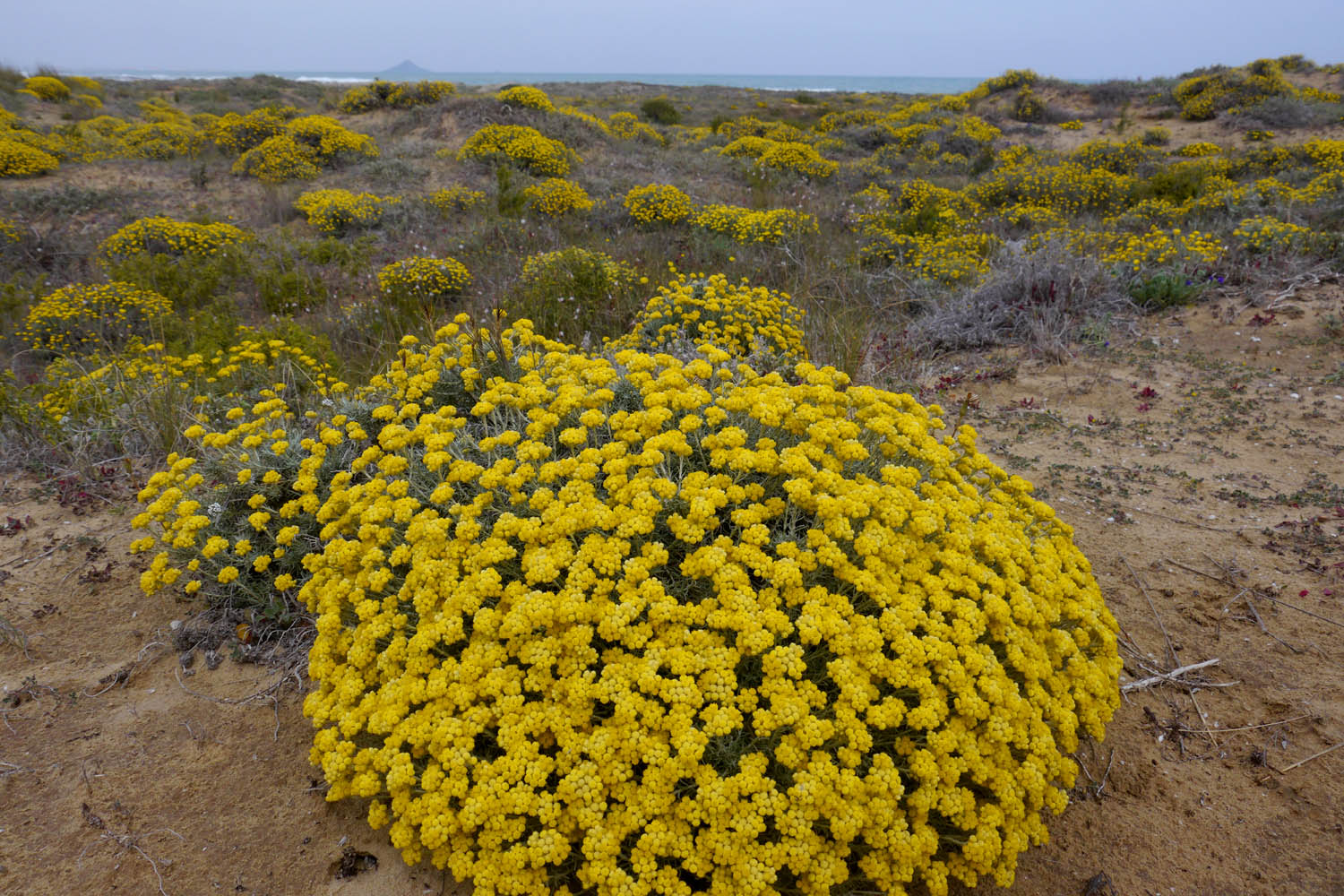
Playa de Las Amoladeras.

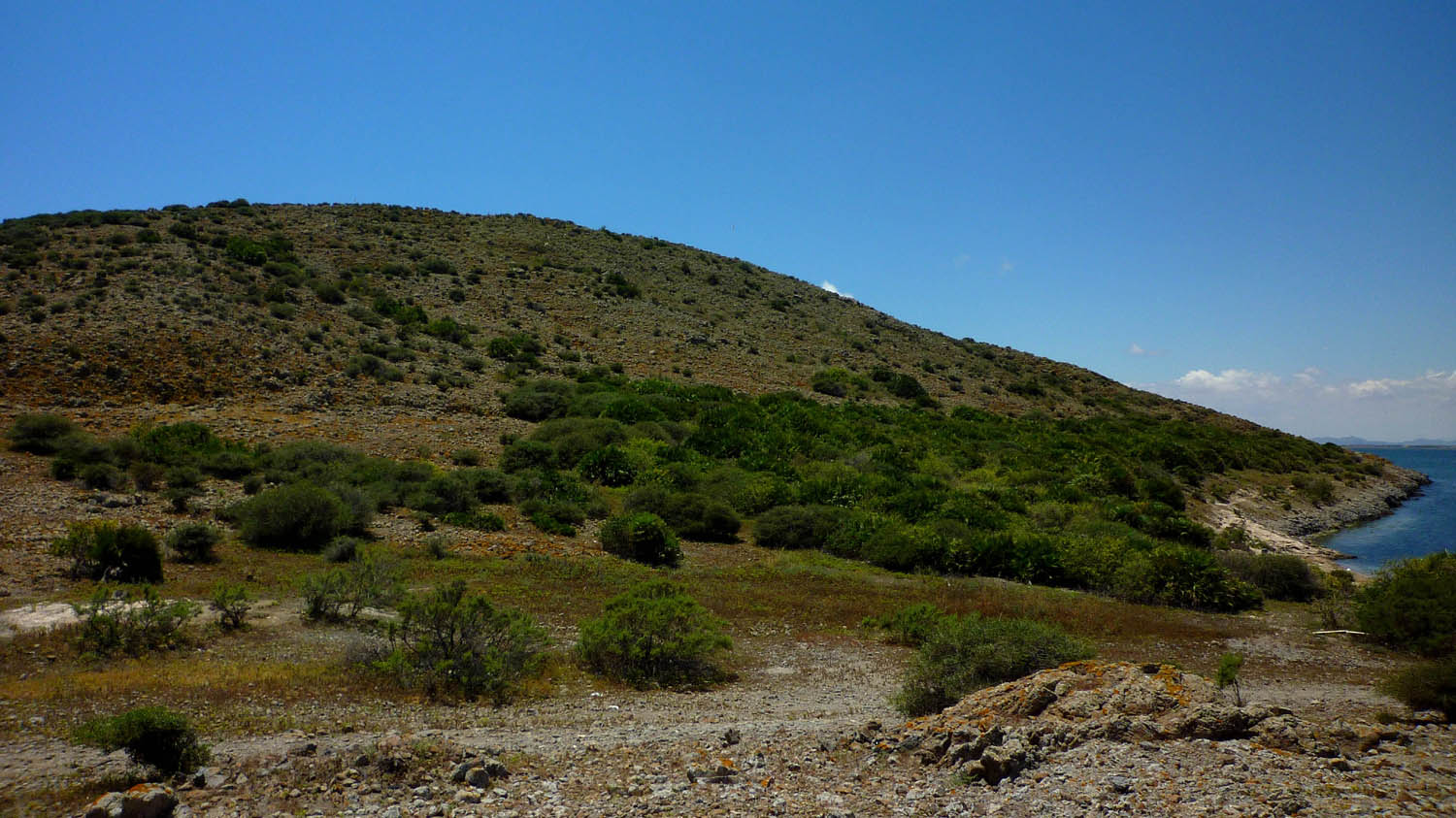
Isla del Ciervo.

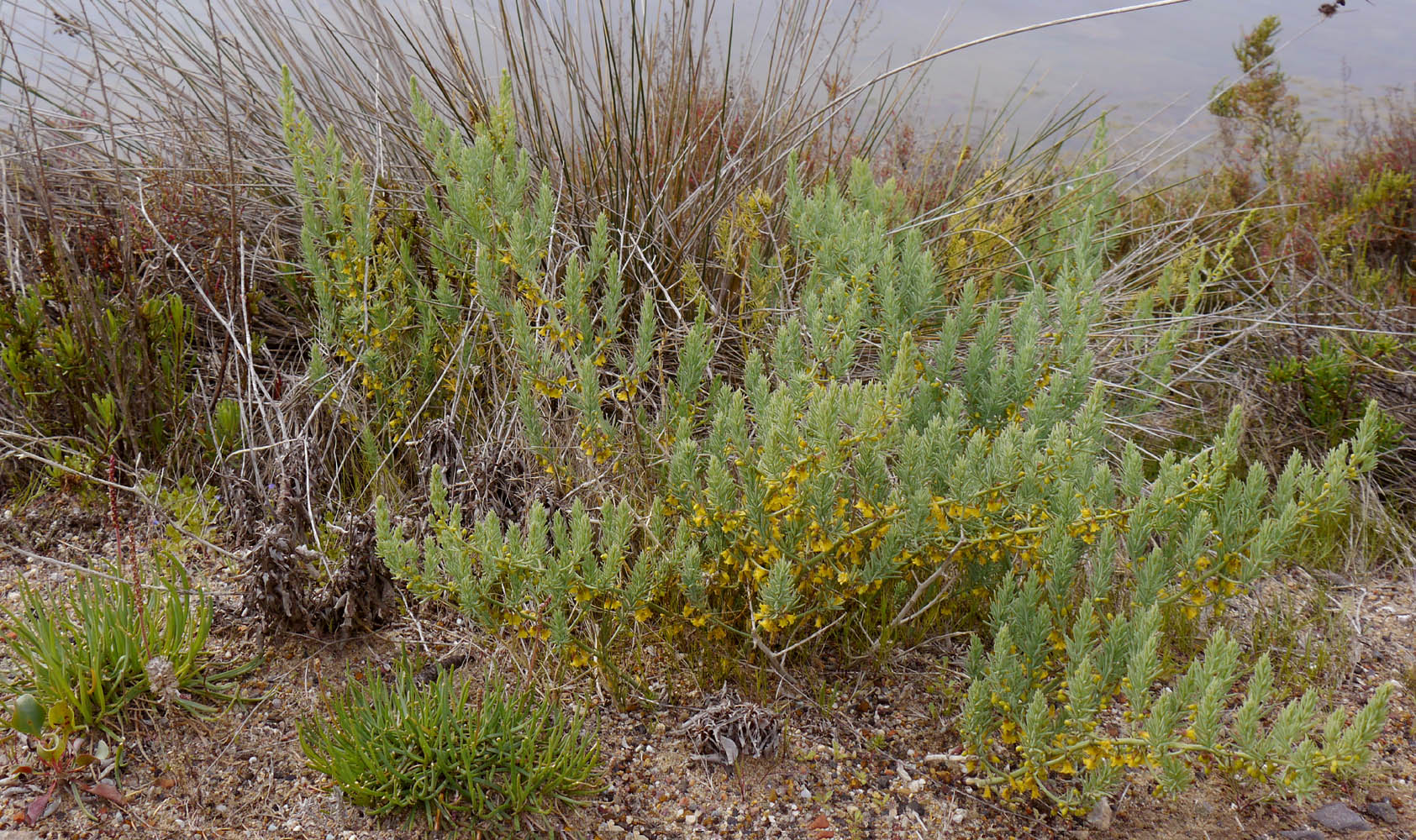
Asparagus macrorrhizus (Mar Menor asparagus), an endemic species in critical danger of extinction.

== Saladar de Punta de Las Lomas Wetland ==
This wetland features the following formations:

- A sandy area (Banco de arena) with herbaceous plants along the coastline, such as Cakile maritima and Salsola kali.
- A salt steppe (Estepa salina), with less water availability, dominated by esparto grass (albardín) and communities of Limonium species.
- A salt marsh (Saladar), consisting of halophytic shrubland (armajal), where species such as Sarcocornia fruticosa (salocor), Arthrocnemum macrostachyum (alacranera), * Suaeda splendens (sosa) and Limonium cossonianum grow, along with a smaller presence of Tamarix boveana (tarayal).
- A reed bed (Juncal or carrizal), where freshwater is more accessible, dominated by Phragmites australis.

Halophytic plants have adapted to survive in these soils with excess salt using various strategies, including excreting salts through specialized glands, diluting salts in water-rich tissues, or concentrating salts in certain leaves that are then shed. From these species (almarjos, sosa, and salicor plants) that grew in salinized soils like El Almarjal, a raw material called "barrilla stone" was once extracted.

All these halophytic plants, referred to as "barrilleras", accumulate a large amount of sodium in their leaves, which was used to make glass, mirrors, and soap. Indeed, the name "sodium" derives from one of these soda-producing plants. Sodium carbonate was extracted by burning these plants in rudimentary earth ovens. The resulting ashes were traded in the form of solid lumps known as "barrillas". Most of Europe’s mirrors and glass up to the early 19th century used barrilla shipped from the ports of Cartagena and Alicante.

The birdlife (avifauna) here includes the Kentish plover (Chorlitejo patinegro), Audouin's gull (Gaviota de Audouin), the Dunlin (Correlimos común), and the European stonechat (Tarabilla común).

== See also ==
- Protected areas of the Region of Murcia
- Protected landscape
- Cabo de Palos Islas Hormigas Marine Reserve
- Volcanoes of the Campo de Cartagena
