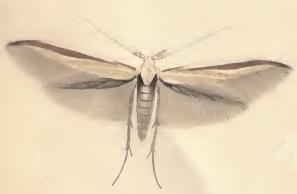

Scientific classification
- Kingdom: Animalia
- Phylum: Arthropoda
- Clade: Pancrustacea
- Class: Insecta
- Order: Lepidoptera
- Family: Coleophoridae
- Genus: Coleophora
- Species: C. caelebipennella

Binomial name
- Coleophora caelebipennella Zeller, 1839

= Coleophora caelebipennella =

Species of moth

Coleophora caelebipennella is a moth of the family Coleophoridae. It is found in most of Europe, except Great Britain, Ireland, and the Balkan Peninsula. It is also known from Pakistan.

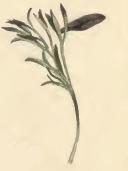
Mined leaf of Artemisia campestris with case attached

Larva

The wingspan is 13–16 mm.

The larvae feed on Artemisia campestris, Artemisia vulgaris, Centaurea, Chrysanthemum, Gnaphalium, Helichrysum arenarium, Helichrysum italicum, Helichrysum italicum serotinum and Helichrysum stoechas. Larvae can be found from September to July.
