= Isla Mayor (Murcia) =

Island in Spain

Coordinates: 37°41′46″N 0°46′14″W

Native name: Isla del Barón
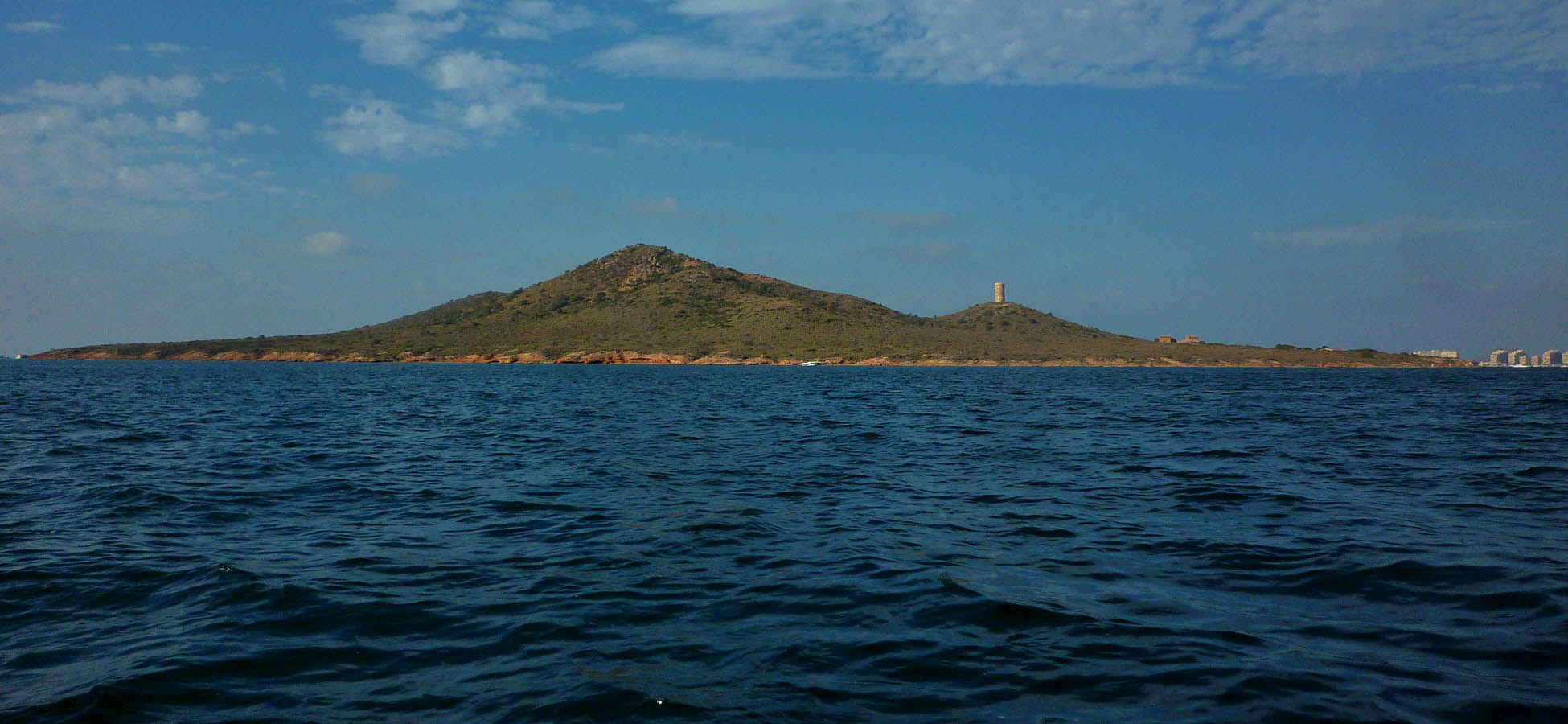
- View of Isla del Barón in the Mar Menor
- Interactive map of Isla Mayor

Geography
- Location: Mar Menor, Region of Murcia, Spain
- Highest elevation: 104 m (341 ft)

Administration
- Spain
- Region: Region of Murcia
- Municipality: San Javier

Isla Mayor (also called Isla del Barón) is a Spanish island located almost at the center of the Mar Menor, in the municipality of San Javier in the Region of Murcia. As its name indicates, it is the largest island both in that inland sea and in the entire Murcian region (93.8 hectares). It is an extinct volcanic cone, which gives the island its distinctive conical shape (104 meters in altitude) and roughly circular perimeter. The island is private property. It takes the name Isla del Barón from the Barón de Benifayó, who built a Neo-Mudéjar-style palace on the island, known as "the baron’s house."

== Characteristics ==
Isla Mayor is entirely occupied by a small stratovolcano. It features a clearly visible but heavily eroded volcanic crater at the summit. There are also two smaller volcanic cones on the island. The northern cone is flattened and partially leveled, while the southeastern cone is more dome-shaped, with its crater no longer visible and somewhat leveled toward the sea. On top of this latter cone sits the private home of the Barón de Benifayó.

== Environmental aspects ==
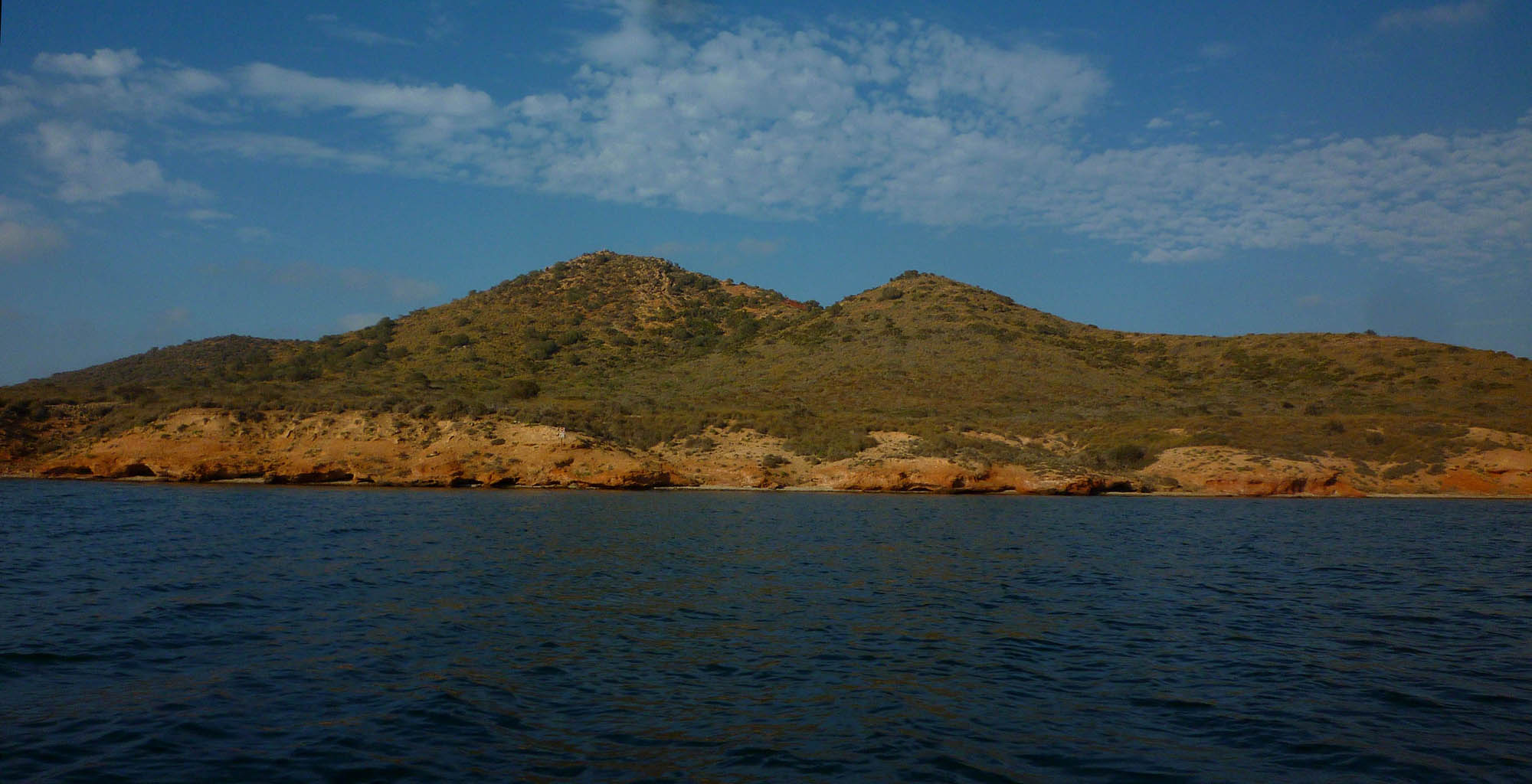
Western slope of the island.

Isla Mayor hosts a forest of Mediterranean dwarf palms (palmitos) considered unique in Europe, as well as diverse birdlife.

In 1986, a small herd of Barbary sheep (arruis) or Atlas mouflons was introduced onto the island, an act detected by the Regional Ministry of the Environment in Murcia, prompting sanctions.

Currently, the island is protected under the designation Open Spaces and Islands of the Mar Menor and classified as a Natural park and SPA (ZEPA).
