= Mar Menor =

Coastal saltwater lagoon in Spain

Coordinates: 37°46′N 00°50′W

Designations

Ramsar Wetland
- Designated: 4 October 1994
- Reference no.: 706

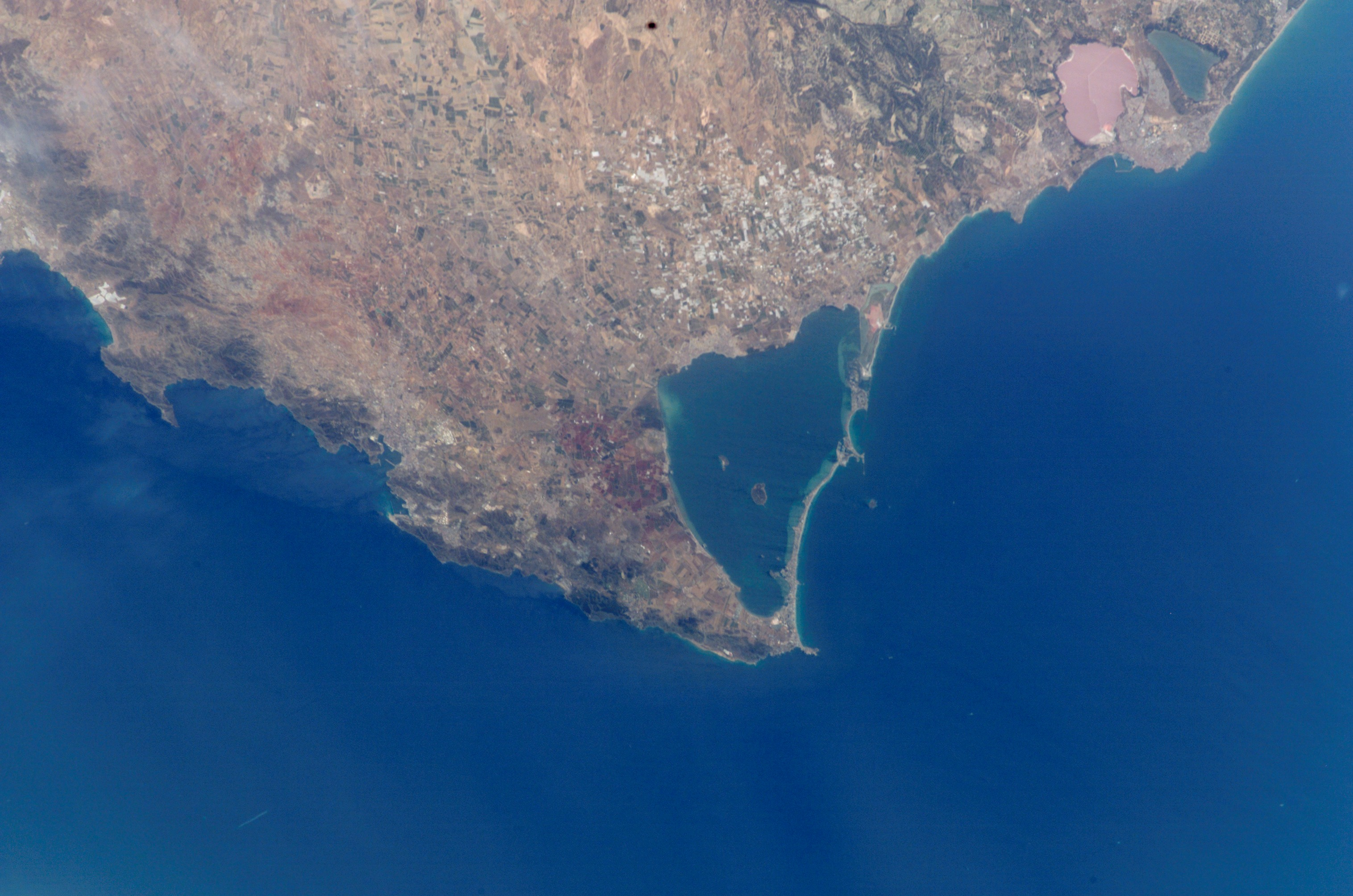
Mar Menor as seen from space

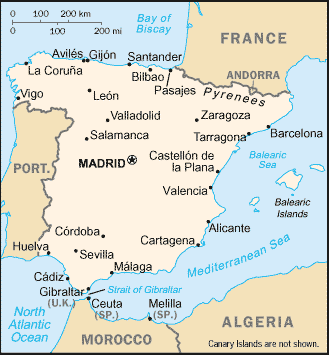

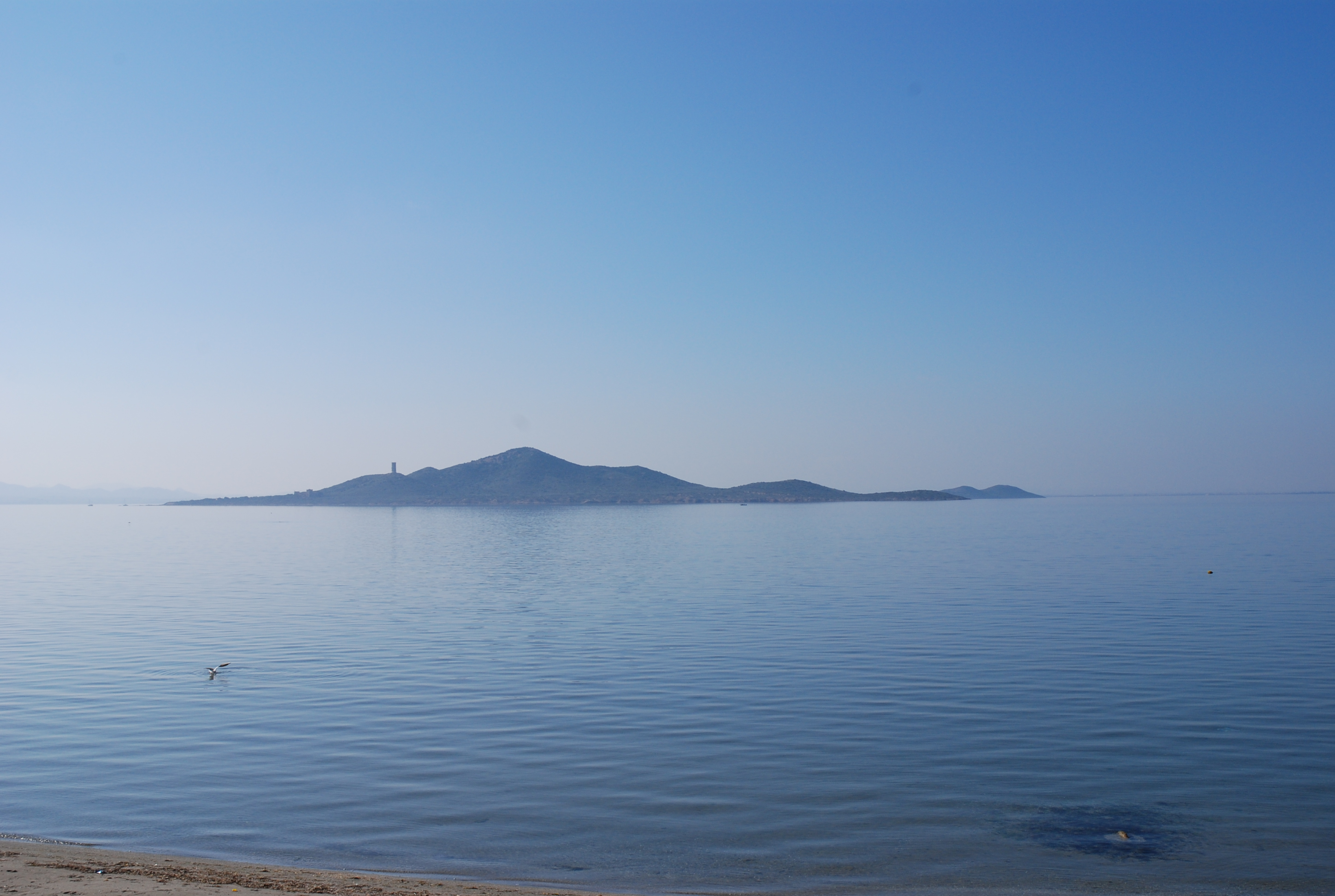
El Barón Island

Mar Menor (Spanish pronunciation: [ˌmaɾ meˈnoɾ], "minor/smaller sea") is a coastal saltwater lagoon in the Iberian Peninsula located south-east of the Autonomous Community of Murcia, Spain, near Cartagena. Its name is the opposite of the Mediterranean, which is the Mar Mayor (greater/larger sea) of the region.

Four municipalities border the Mar Menor: Cartagena, Los Alcázares, San Javier and San Pedro del Pinatar. With a surface area of 135 km^{2}, a coastal length of 70 km, and warm and clear water no more than 7 metres in depth, it is the largest lagoon in Spain.

The lagoon is separated from the Mediterranean Sea by La Manga ("the sleeve"), a sandbar 22 km in length whose width ranges from 100 to 1,200 metres, with Cape Palos in its south-eastern vertex making for the lagoon's roughly triangular shape. There are five islets located within the lagoon: Perdiguera islet, Mayor or El Barón islet, Ciervo islet, Redonda islet and del Sujeto islet.

Its relatively high salinity (which aids flotation), low waves, and remarkable sporting infrastructures makes it a popular place for a wide variety of water sports.

== Ecological importance ==
At the northern end there are salt flats, which include a wetland of international importance. This area is preserved as a natural park administered by the regional government: the Salinas y Arenales de San Pedro del Pinatar (‘San Pedro del Pinatar salt flats and sand beaches’). The microbes that live in this coastal lagoon have been recently described.

The islets and the few coastal places without permanent human constructions are a protected landscape: the Espacios abiertos e islas del Mar Menor (‘Mar Menor open areas and islands’).

In 1994 the Mar Menor was included on the Ramsar Convention list for the conservation and sustainable utilisation of wetlands. The Mar Menor is also part of a Specially Protected Area of Mediterranean Importance and is a Special Protection Area (ZEPA in Spanish) for bird life.

In July 2016 pollution was reportedly so severe as to render the area close to ecological collapse, following 18 years of neglected warnings. The public prosecutor's office is investigating allegations of negligence against the relevant authorities, which are governed by the conservative People's Party

In May 2017 all beaches of the Mar Menor were stripped of their Blue Flag status as a result of the polluted condition of the Mar Menor in 2016.

In October 2019 the pollution entering after floods in September led to thousands of dead fish lining the beaches, having suffocated due to a lack of oxygen. Intensive farming in surrounding areas leads to high levels of nitrates, ammonium and phosphates from fertilizers being washed into the lagoon, causing eutrophication, an excessive growth of algae and bacteria that deprives the water of oxygen.

A similar event occurred in August 2021, with four to five tons of dead fish being removed from the lagoon within a week. Shortly thereafter, a large demonstration took place, with 70,000 people surrounding the entire lagoon on August 28, 2021.

== Legal status ==
Beginning in 2018 in response to the recurring hypoxic events, activists from civil society have lobbied under the name of "ILP (Iniciativa Legisativa Popular) Mar Menor" for a law that would recognize the right of the Mar Menor ecosystem to exist, treating it as a "legal person" following the legal paradigm of rights of nature. In October 2022, Spanish lawmakers granted these rights, making the Mar Menor the first case of an ecosystem protected by rights of nature in Europe. The Mar Menor is now legally represented by a group of citizens, scientists and officials; furthermore, anyone can bring legal action on behalf of Mar Menor, without first having to prove legal standing.

== History ==
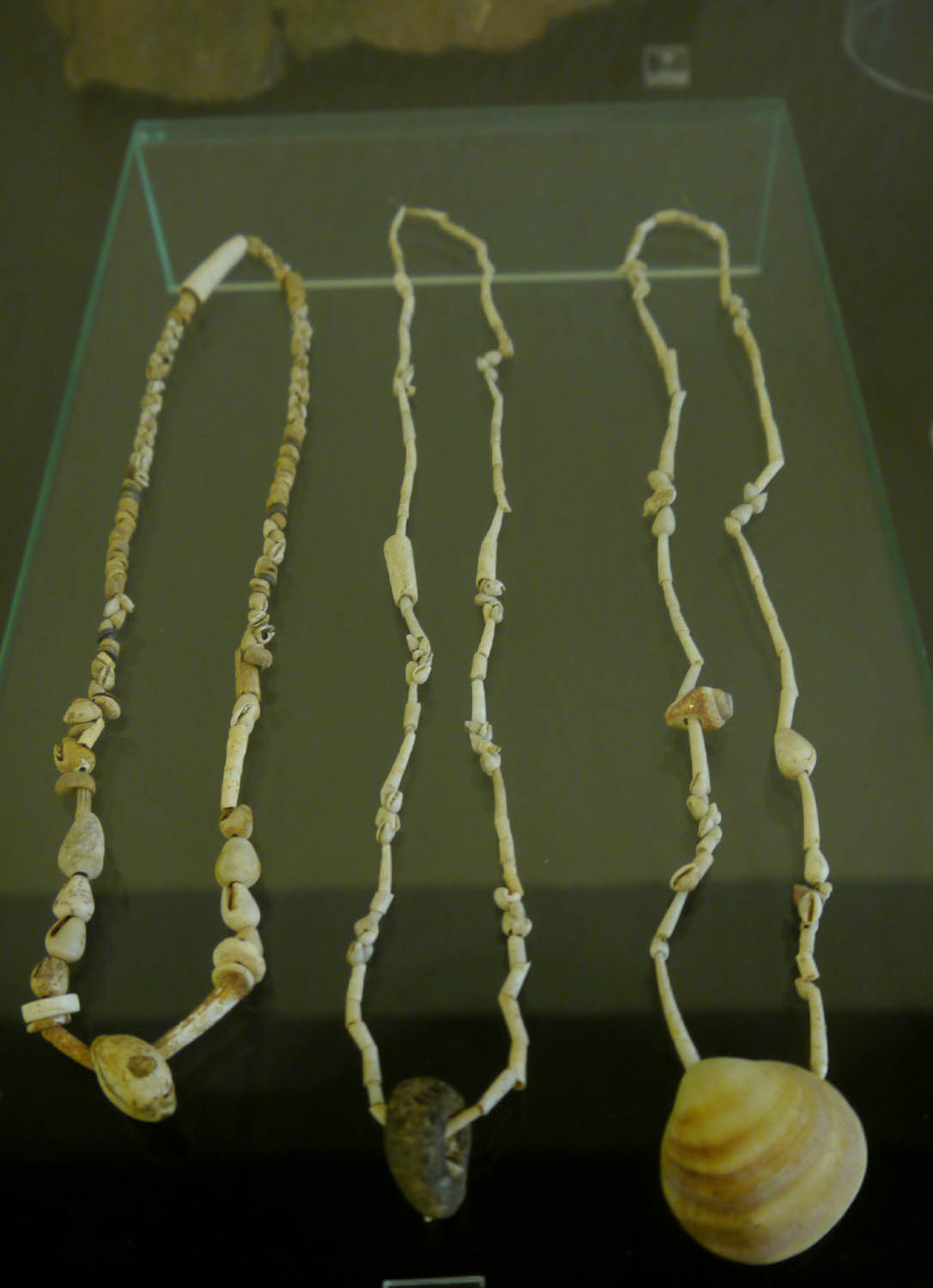
Necklace in the Museo Arqueológico Municipal de Cartagena from the Marchamalo salt flats.

The Mar Menor’s earliest human occupation dates back to the Paleolithic era, with significant evidence at sites such as the Marchamalo salt flats, dated to the Copper Age. Under the Roman Empire, the lagoon—known then as “Palus”—thrived on a salting industry that produced the prized garum sauce, and it served as a safe harbor for vessels. Later, Arab rule introduced techniques like encañizadas, elaborate fishing devices placed in natural channels between the Mar Menor and the Mediterranean.

In the thirteenth century, following the conquest of the Taifa of Murcia by Alfonso X of Castile, Muslim inhabitants were expelled and Christian settlers moved into the region. Coastal defense against Barbary pirates became a priority over the subsequent centuries, prompting monarchs like Charles V and Philip II to commission watchtowers and fortifications along La Manga and at Cabo de Palos. Despite these efforts, pirate raids continued, leaving many parts of the shoreline sparsely populated.

By the nineteenth century, municipalities such as San Javier and San Pedro del Pinatar formed, setting the stage for twentieth-century developments. Early in that century, health tourism became popular as visitors flocked to the Mar Menor for “novenarios” (a cycle of nine therapeutic baths). Over time, lighthouses were erected, an air-naval base was established at Santiago de la Ribera, and new hotels and summer residences appeared along the coast.

During the Franco era, large-scale investment flowed into La Manga, spearheaded by figures like Tomás Maestre Aznar, who consolidated landholdings and promoted urbanization. While this led to economic growth, the lack of environmental safeguards triggered ecological damage, including reduced salinity levels and habitat loss. Today, conservation and sustainable tourism efforts seek to balance the Mar Menor’s historical legacy with the need to protect its unique ecosystem.

== Panoramic view of Mar Menor and La Manga ==
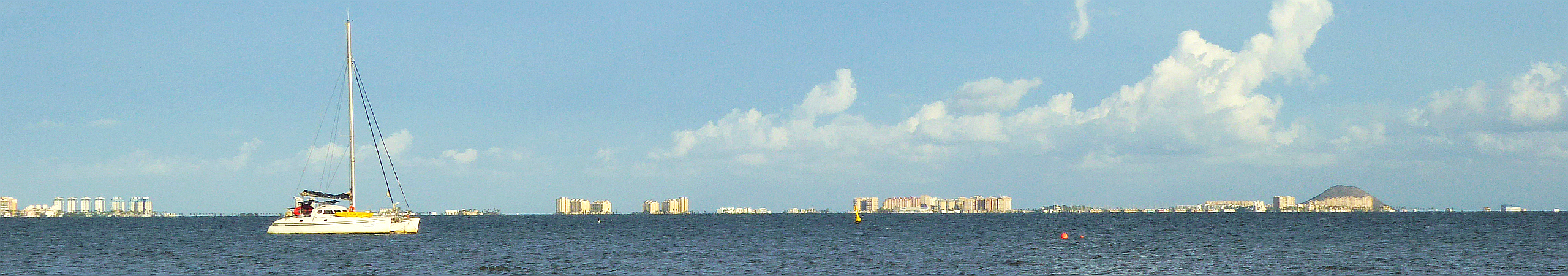
Panoramic view of Mar Menor and the 22-kilometre La Manga on its eastern horizon
