= Cape Palos =

Cape and locality in Spain

Coordinates: 37°38′10″N 0°41′22″W

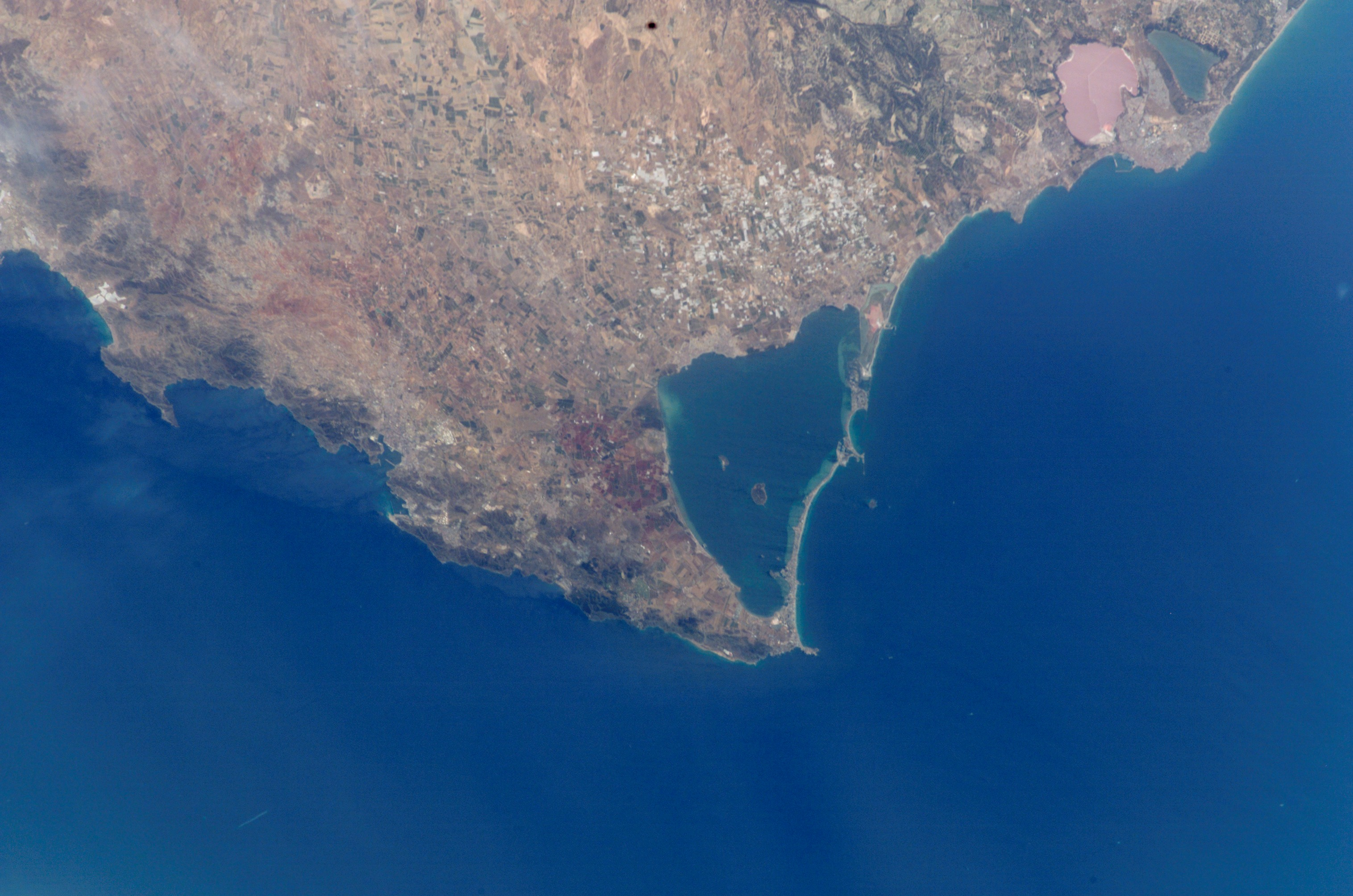
Satellite view of the Mar Menor, Cartagena, and Cape Palos.

Cape Palos (Spanish: Cabo de Palos) is a cape in the Spanish municipality of Cartagena, in the region of Murcia. It is part of a small range of volcanic mounts that form a small peninsula. The Mediterranean islands of Grosa and the group known as the Hormigas Islands are part of this range, as well as the islands in the Mar Menor (“Little Sea”). The name Palos is derived from the Latin word palus, meaning lagoon, a reference to the Mar Menor.

According to Pliny the Elder and Rufus Festus Avienus, there was once a temple dedicated to Baal Hammon on the promontory of the cape, which later became associated with the cult of Saturn. During the reign of Philip II of Spain, a watchtower was built on the promontory as a defense measure against the Barbary Pirates. Some battles occurred in the place include the Battle of Cape Palos (1591) during the Anglo-Spanish War (1585–1604), Battle of Cape Palos (1758) during the Spanish-Barbary conflict (1694–1792), Battle of Cape Palos (1815) during the Second Barbary War and Battle of Cape Palos (1938) during the Spanish Civil War.

Its lighthouse began operating on January 31, 1865. The cape is part of a marine reserve, the Reserva Marina de Cabo de Palos e Islas Hormigas.

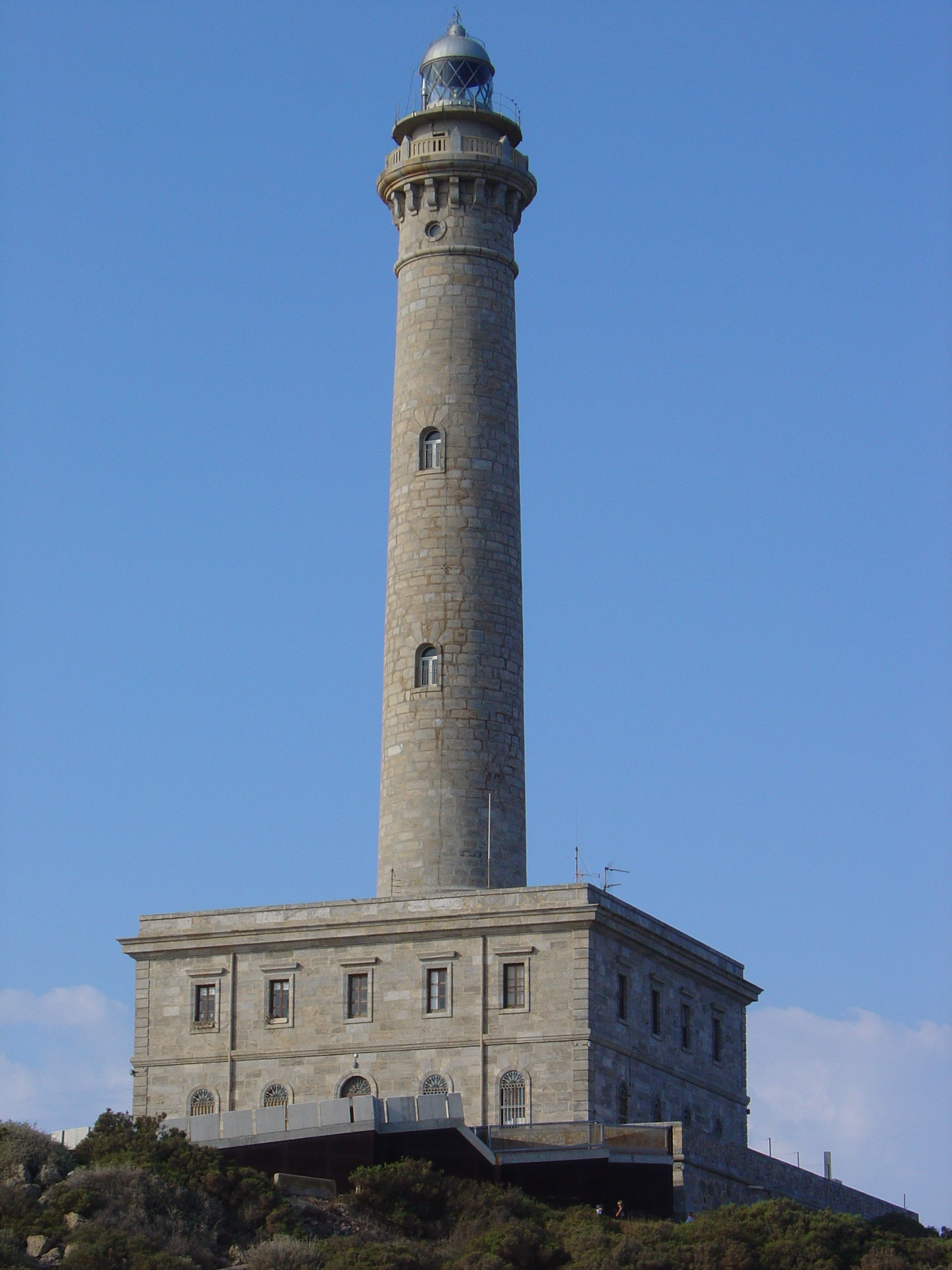
Cape Palos Lighthouse

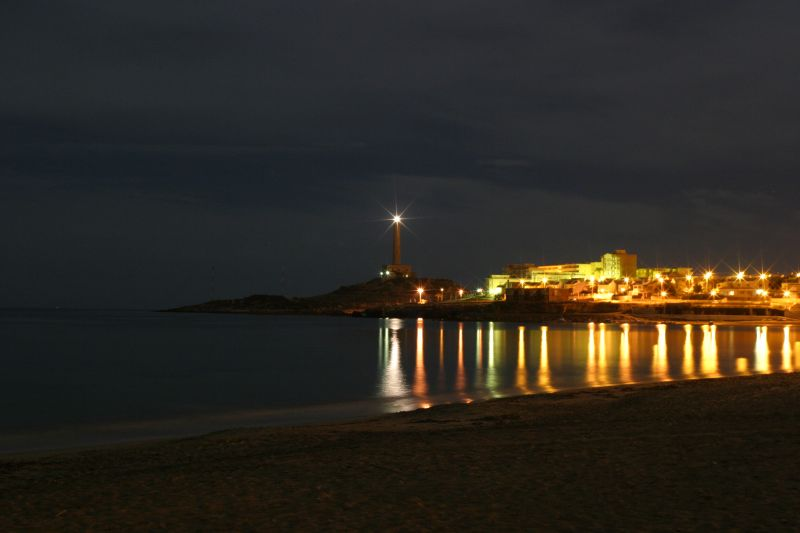
Lighthouse at night

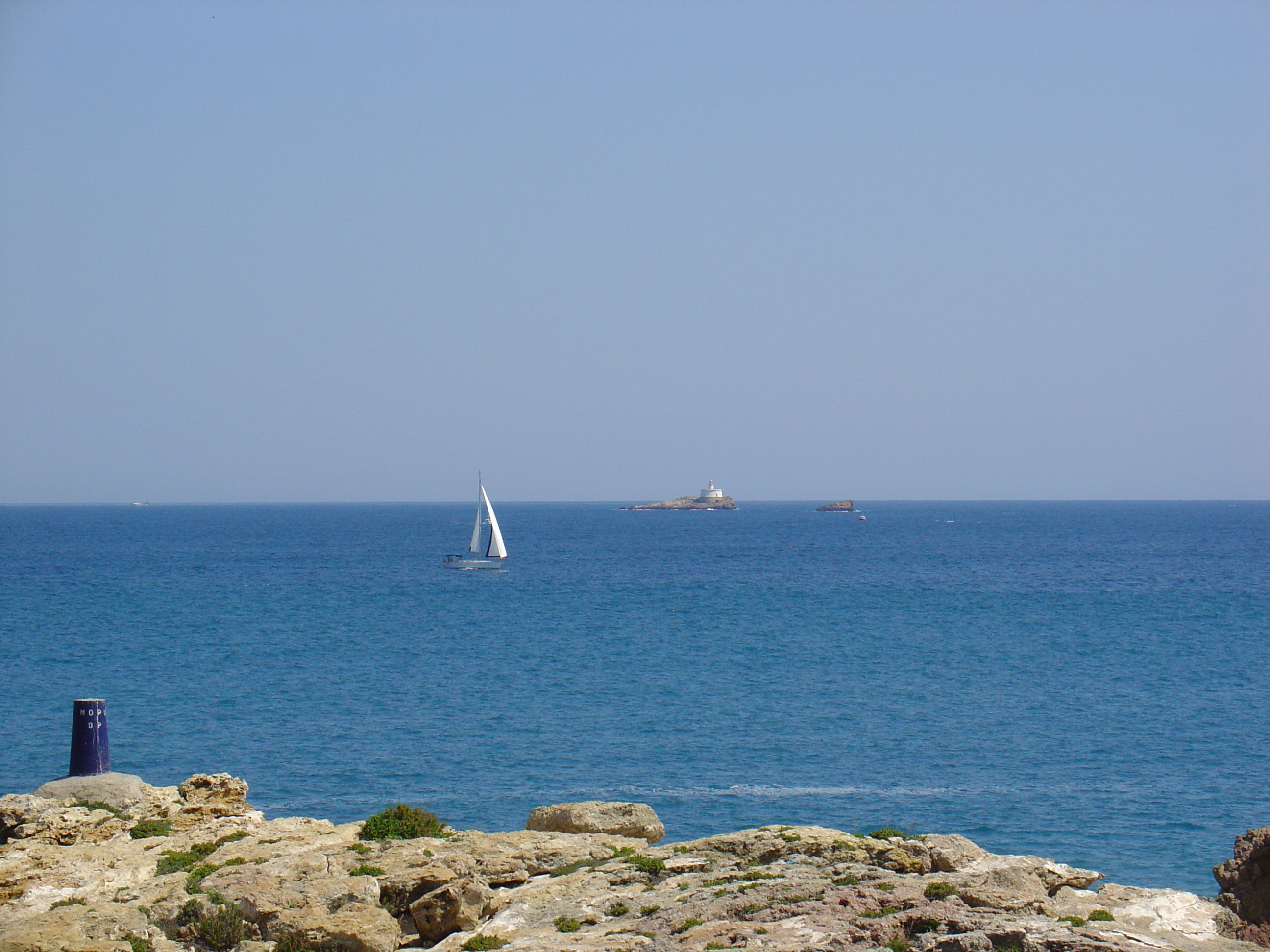
Hormiga Island Beacon (white)

== Diving ==
The waters off Cape Palos are a recreational scuba-diving destination, centred on the marine reserve Reserva Marina de Cabo de Palos e Islas Hormigas, established in 1995 around the Islas Hormigas archipelago. The reserve protects a system of submerged seamounts (locally bajos), rocky reefs and several historic shipwrecks; recreational diving inside its boundaries is permitted only through authorised dive centres and is subject to a daily diver quota.

The area is known among divers for high fish abundance inside the reserve, including resident dusky groupers and summer schools of barracuda, together with a cluster of deep wrecks. Among the best-known wrecks are the Italian passenger steamer Sirio, lost near the Islas Hormigas in 1906 with heavy loss of life; the cargo ship Nord América (sunk 1930); and the merchant vessel Naranjito (sunk 1946), which lies largely intact and is among the most frequently dived wrecks of the area. Principal dive sites include the seamounts Bajo de Dentro and Bajo de Fuera and the Piles pinnacles.

Conditions are more exposed than much of the Spanish Mediterranean coast, with currents and summer thermoclines that affect site selection.
