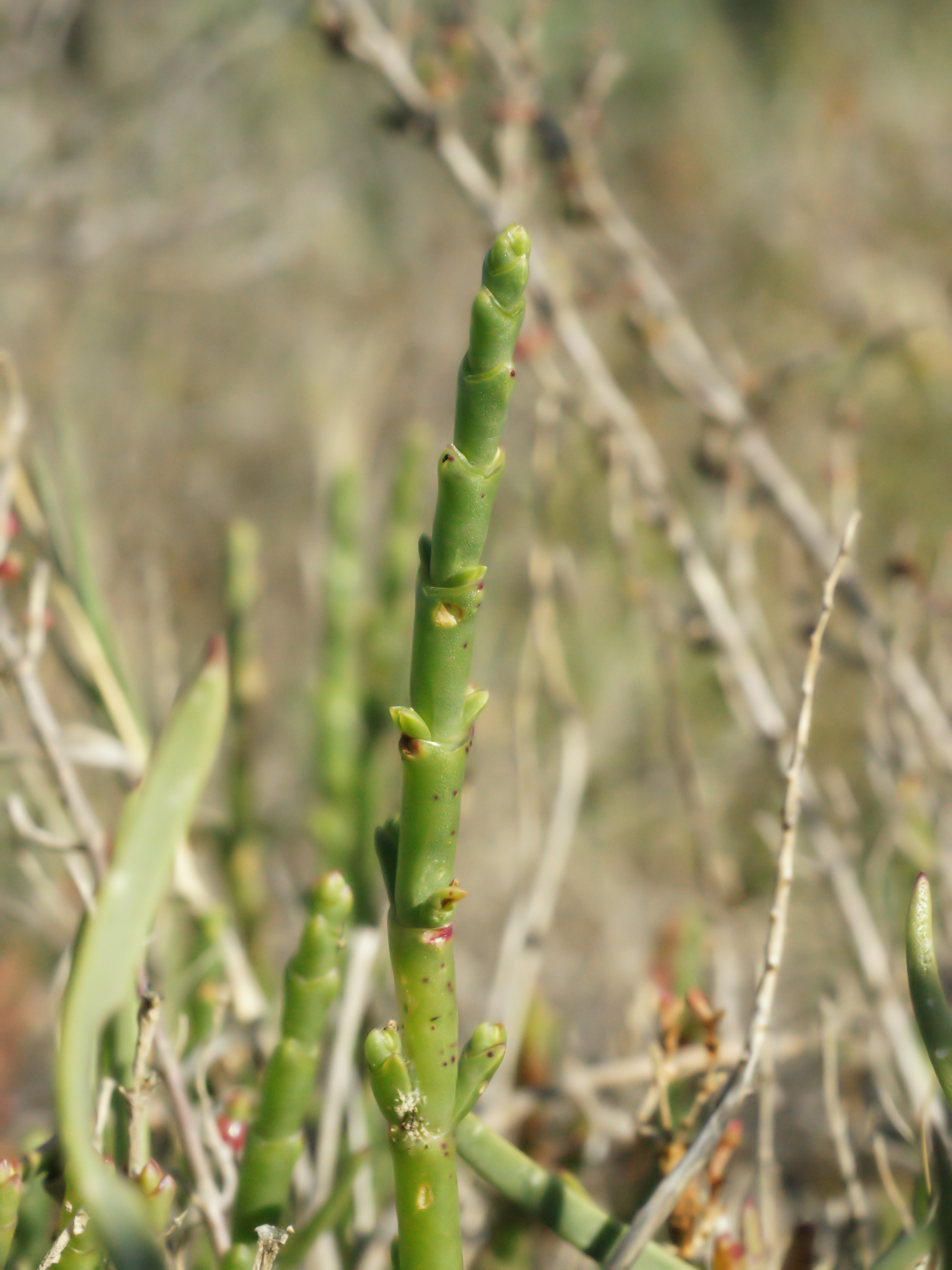

Scientific classification
- Kingdom: Plantae
- Clade: Tracheophytes
- Clade: Angiosperms
- Clade: Eudicots
- Order: Caryophyllales
- Family: Amaranthaceae
- Genus: Salicornia
- Species: S. fruticosa

Binomial name
- Salicornia fruticosa (L.) L.

Synonyms
- Arthrocnemum fruticosum (L.) Moq.; Salicornia anceps Lag.; Salicornia arabica L.; Salicornia deserticola A.Chev.; Salicornia equisetifolia Willd. ex Moq.; Salicornia europaea var. fruticosa L.; Salicornia frutescens Friedr. ex Ung.-Sternb.; Salicornia glauca Stokes; Salicornia sempervirens Sauvages ex Steud.; Sarcocornia fruticosa (L.) A.J.Scott; Sarcocornia fruticosa var. deflexa (Rouy) Lahondere & Gamisans

= Salicornia fruticosa =

Species of plant

Salicornia fruticosa, synonym Sarcocornia fruticosa, known commonly as the shrubby marsh samphire, is a species of glasswort in the family Amaranthaceae (pigweeds). It is native to southern Europe, north Africa, Western Asia and Yemen. It is a halophyte, a plant that can grow in saline conditions.

It is the main saltwort species used in making special pot ash made during Mesopotamian times to the early Islamic era – قَلَيّ qali – which is the basis for the word "alkali".
