= Altar Municipality =

Coordinates: 30°43′N 111°50′W

Altar
- Municipality
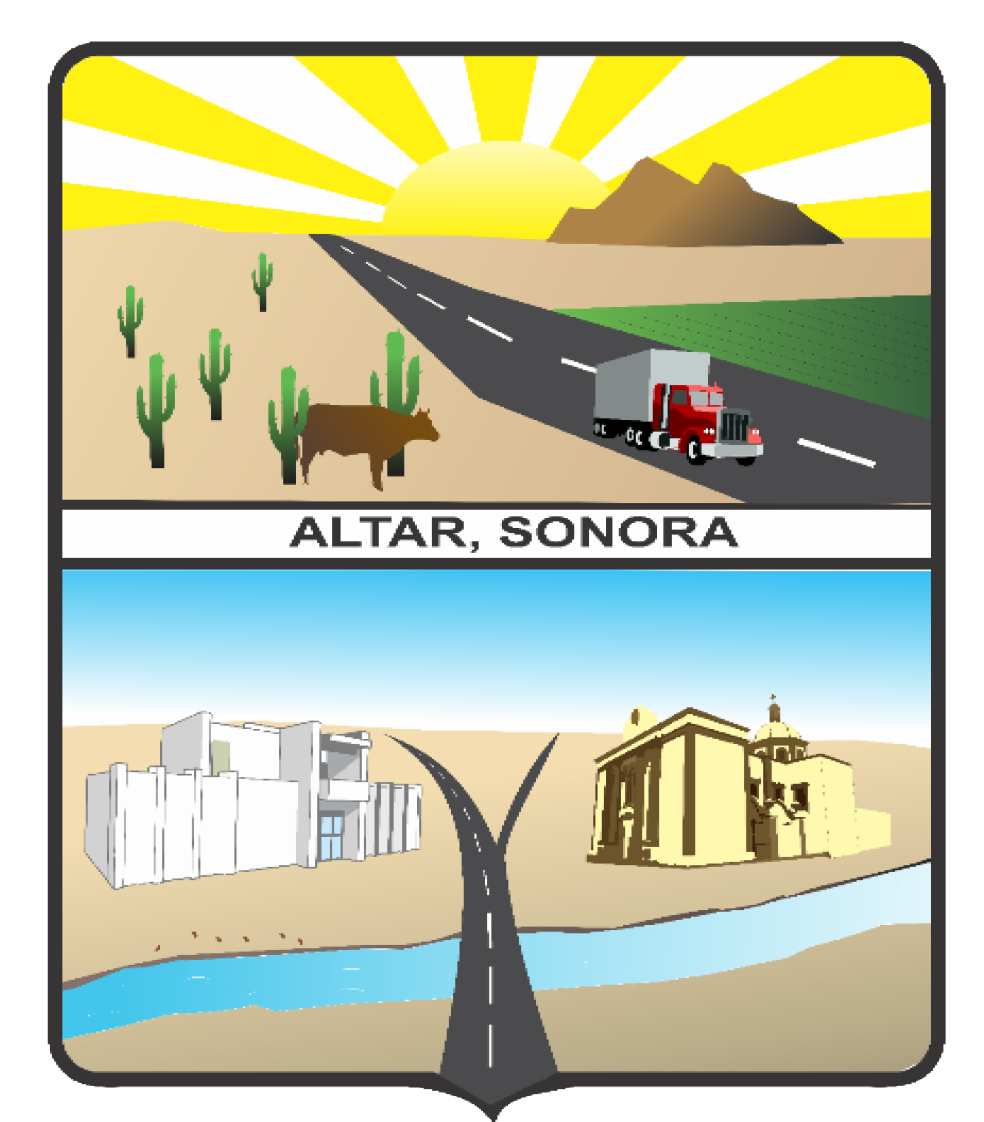
- Coat of arms

- Location of the municipality in Sonora.
- Country: Mexico
- State: Sonora
- Municipal seat: Altar

Population (2020)
  - Total: 9,492
  - Density: 240/km^{2} (620/sq mi)
- Time zone: UTC–07:00 (Zona Pacífico)
- Area code: +52 637
- Website: altar.gob.mx

Altar is a municipality in the state of Sonora in north-western Mexico. The municipality had a 2010 census population of 9,049 inhabitants, the vast majority of whom lived in the municipal seat of Altar, which had a population of 7,927 inhabitants. There are no other localities with over 1,000 inhabitants.

== History ==
The territory of the municipality was originally inhabited by the O'odham people. In 1755, the Spanish founded Presidio Santa Gertrudis del Altar in response to the 1751 Pima Rebellion. It was later renamed to Nuestra Señora de Guadalupe del Altar.

== Geography ==
The total area of the municipality (urban and rural) is 3,944.90 square kilometers. The municipal population in 2010 was 9,049 inhabitants, with 7,927 (87.6%) living in the municipal seat. Other settlements are La Cabecera Municipal, Ejido 16 de Septiembre, Ejido Llano Blanco, and Ejido Santa Matilde.

Surrounding municipalities are Sáric, Tubutama, Atil, Trincheras, Pitiquito, Caborca and Oquitoa. The northern boundary is with Pima County in the U.S. state of Arizona.

=== Climate ===
The land lies at an elevation of 200–400 metres (660–1,310 ft) sloping towards the Gulf of California. The climate is dry with extremely high temperatures in the summer. The temperatures sometimes exceed 131 °F (55 °C) and is among the hottest places in the world from May to September.

== Economy ==
The economy is based on agriculture and cattle raising. The main crops are wheat, cotton, corn, beans, sorghum, and table grapes. The town is also a staging area for the flow of immigrants that will attempt entry into the United States through the shared Sonoran Desert.

== Towns and villages ==
Map of the largest localities in the municipality.

The largest localities (cities, towns, and villages) are:

| Name | 2010 Census Population |
|---|---|
| Altar | 7,927 |
| Llano Blanco (Rancho Seco) | 460 |
| 16 de Septiembre | 296 |
| Total Municipality | 9,049 |

== Adjacent municipalities and counties ==
- Sáric Municipality - northeast
- Tubutama Municipality - east
- Atil Municipality - southeast
- Oquitoa Municipality - southeast
- Trincheras Municipality - south
- Pitiquito Municipality - southwest
- Caborca Municipality - west
- Pima County, Arizona - north
