= 5th federal electoral district of Sonora =

Federal electoral district of Mexico

Sonora's 5th
- Electoral district of the Chamber of Deputies of Mexico

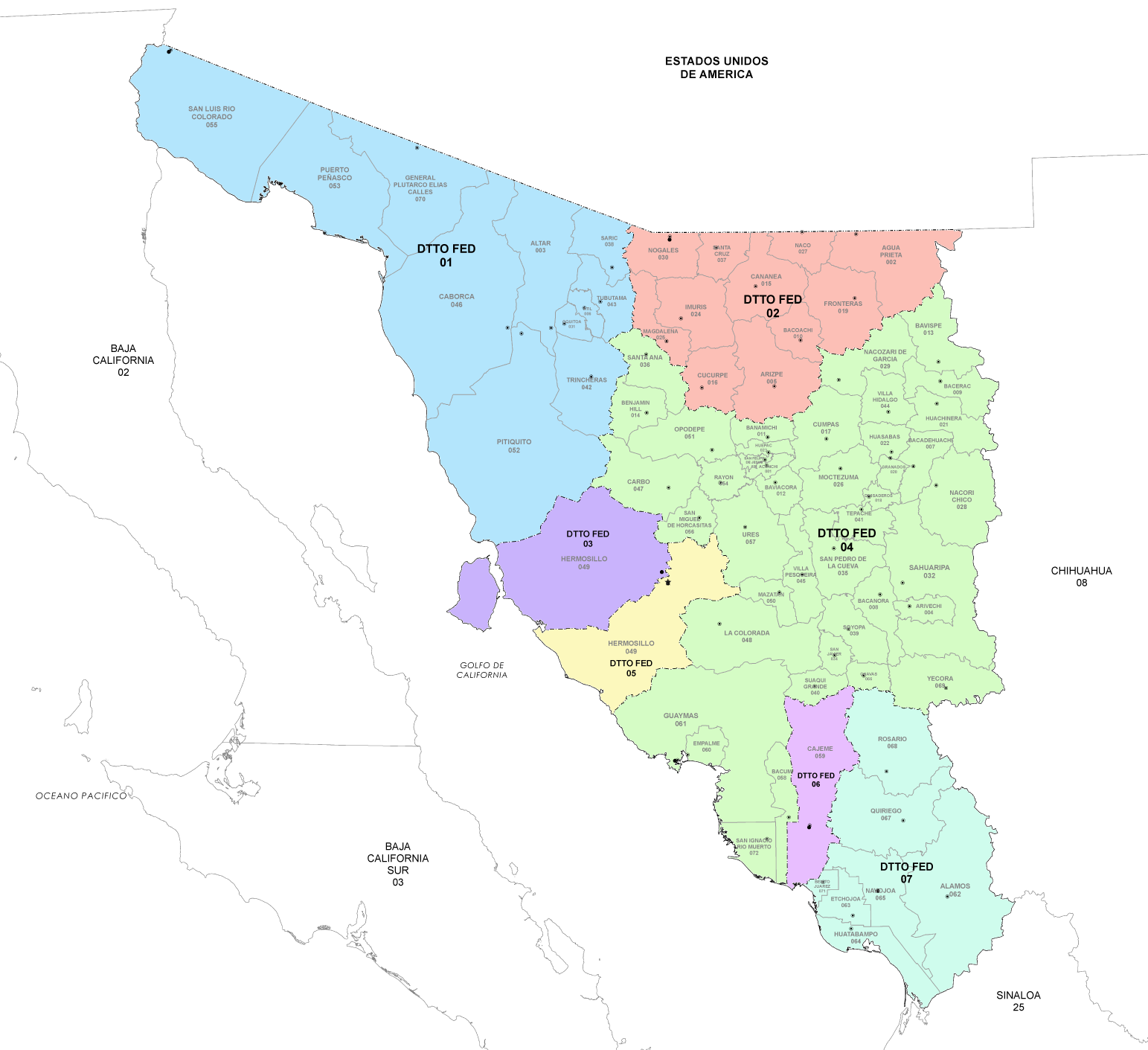
- 5th district since 2023

Incumbent
- Member: Jacobo Mendoza Ruiz
- Party: ▌Morena
- Congress: 66th (2024–2027)

District
- State: Sonora
- Head town: Hermosillo
- Coordinates: 29°05′N 110°15′W
- Covers: Municipality of Hermosillo (part)
- PR region: First
- Precincts: 217
- Population: 468,661 (2020 census)

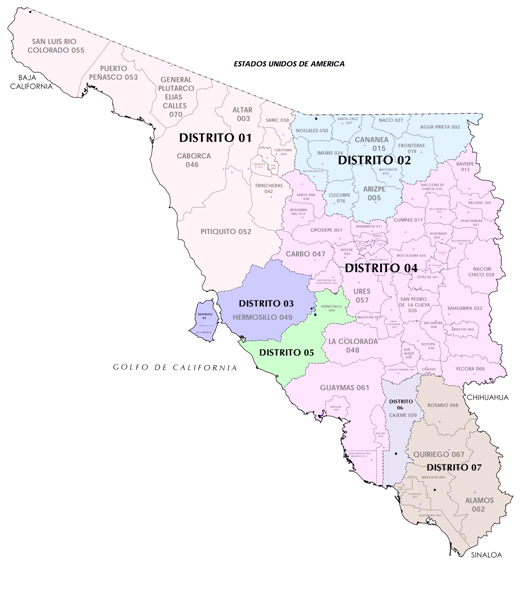
Sonora under the 2017–2022 districting plan

The 5th federal electoral district of Sonora (Spanish: Distrito electoral federal 05 de Sonora) is one of the 300 electoral districts into which Mexico is divided for elections to the federal Chamber of Deputies and one of seven such districts in the state of Sonora.

It elects one deputy to the lower house of Congress for each three-year legislative session by means of the first past-the-post system. Votes cast in the district also count towards the calculation of proportional representation ("plurinominal") deputies elected from the first region.

Suspended in 1930, (Note: An amendment to Article 52 of the Constitution in 1928 changed the original provision of "one deputy per 60,000 inhabitants" to "one deputy per 100,000"; as a result, the size of the Chamber of Deputies fell from 281 in the 1928 election to 171 in 1934.) the 5th district was re-established in 1978 and was contested again in the 1979 legislative election.

The current member for the district, elected in the 2024 general election, is Jacobo Mendoza Ruiz of the National Regeneration Movement (Morena).

== District territory ==
Under the 2023 districting plan adopted by the National Electoral Institute (INE), which is to be used for the 2024, 2027 and 2030 federal elections, Sonora's 5th district covers 217 electoral precincts (secciones electorales) in the south-eastern half of the municipality of Hermosillo.

The head town (cabecera distrital), where results from individual polling stations are gathered together and tallied, is the state capital, the city of Hermosillo. The district reported a population of 468,661 in the 2020 census.

== Previous districting schemes ==
Evolution of electoral district numbers
	1974	1978	1996	2005	2017	2023
Sonora	4	7	7	7	7	7
Chamber of Deputies	196	300				

2017–2022

Between 2017 and 2022, as at present, the district covered the south-east of the municipality of Hermosillo.

1996–2017

In both the 1996 and 2005 districting plans, the district covered the southern and eastern parts of the municipality of Hermosillo, albeit with adjustments to the dividing line with the remainder of the municipality (belonging to the 3rd district) under the different schemes.

1978–1996

The districting scheme in force from 1978 to 1996 was the result of the 1977 electoral reforms, which increased the number of single-member seats in the Chamber of Deputies from 196 to 300. Under that plan, Sonora's seat allocation rose from four to seven. The restored 5th district had its head town at San Luis Río Colorado and it covered 14 municipalities in the state's north-west:
- Altar, Atil, Benjamín Hill, Caborca, Carbó, Opodepe, Oquitoa, Pitiquito, Puerto Peñasco, San Luis Río Colorado, Santa Ana, Sáric, Trincheras and Tubutama.

== Deputies returned to Congress ==
(Mexico) National parties
- Current
- PAN
- PRI
- PT
- PVEM
- MC
- Morena
- PAZ
- Somos
- Defunct or local only
- PLM
- PNR
- PRM
- PNM
- PP
- PPS
- PARM
- PFCRN
- CON
- PANAL
- PSD
- PES
- PES
- PRD

Sonora's 5th district
Election	Deputy	Party	Term	Legislature
1979	Salomón Faz Sánchez	Institutional Revolutionary Party	1979–1982	51st Congress
1982	Ricardo Castillo Peralta	Institutional Revolutionary Party	1982–1985	52nd Congress
1985	Ismael Torres Díaz	Institutional Revolutionary Party	1985–1988	53rd Congress
1988	Víctor Hugo Celaya Celaya	Institutional Revolutionary Party	1988–1991	54th Congress
1991	Luis Moreno Bustamante	Institutional Revolutionary Party	1991–1994	55th Congress
1994	Leobardo Aguirre Corral	Institutional Revolutionary Party	1994–1997	56th Congress
1997	Héctor Larios Córdova	National Action Party (Mexico)	1997–2000	57th Congress
2000	María Isabel Velasco Ramos	National Action Party (Mexico)	2000–2003	58th Congress
2003	Gustavo Adolfo de Unanue	National Action Party (Mexico)	2003–2006	59th Congress
2006	Luis Fernando Rodríguez Ahumada	National Action Party (Mexico)	2006–2009	60th Congress
2009	Manuel Ignacio Acosta Gutiérrez	Institutional Revolutionary Party	2009–2012	61st Congress
2012	Damián Zepeda Vidales	National Action Party (Mexico)	2012–2015	62nd Congress
2015	Ulises Cristopulos Ríos	Institutional Revolutionary Party	2015–2018	63rd Congress
2018	Wendy Briceño Zuloaga	National Regeneration Movement	2018–2021	64th Congress
2021	Wendy Briceño Zuloaga; Judith Tanori Córdova	National Regeneration Movement	2021; 2021–2024	65th Congress
2024	Jacobo Mendoza Ruiz	National Regeneration Movement	2024–2027	66th Congress

== Presidential elections ==
Sonora's 5th district
Election	District won by	Party or coalition	%
2018	Andrés Manuel López Obrador	Juntos Haremos Historia	53.8248
2024	Claudia Sheinbaum Pardo	Sigamos Haciendo Historia	53.3679
