= 1st federal electoral district of Sonora =

Federal electoral district of Mexico

Sonora's 1st
- Electoral district of the Chamber of Deputies of Mexico

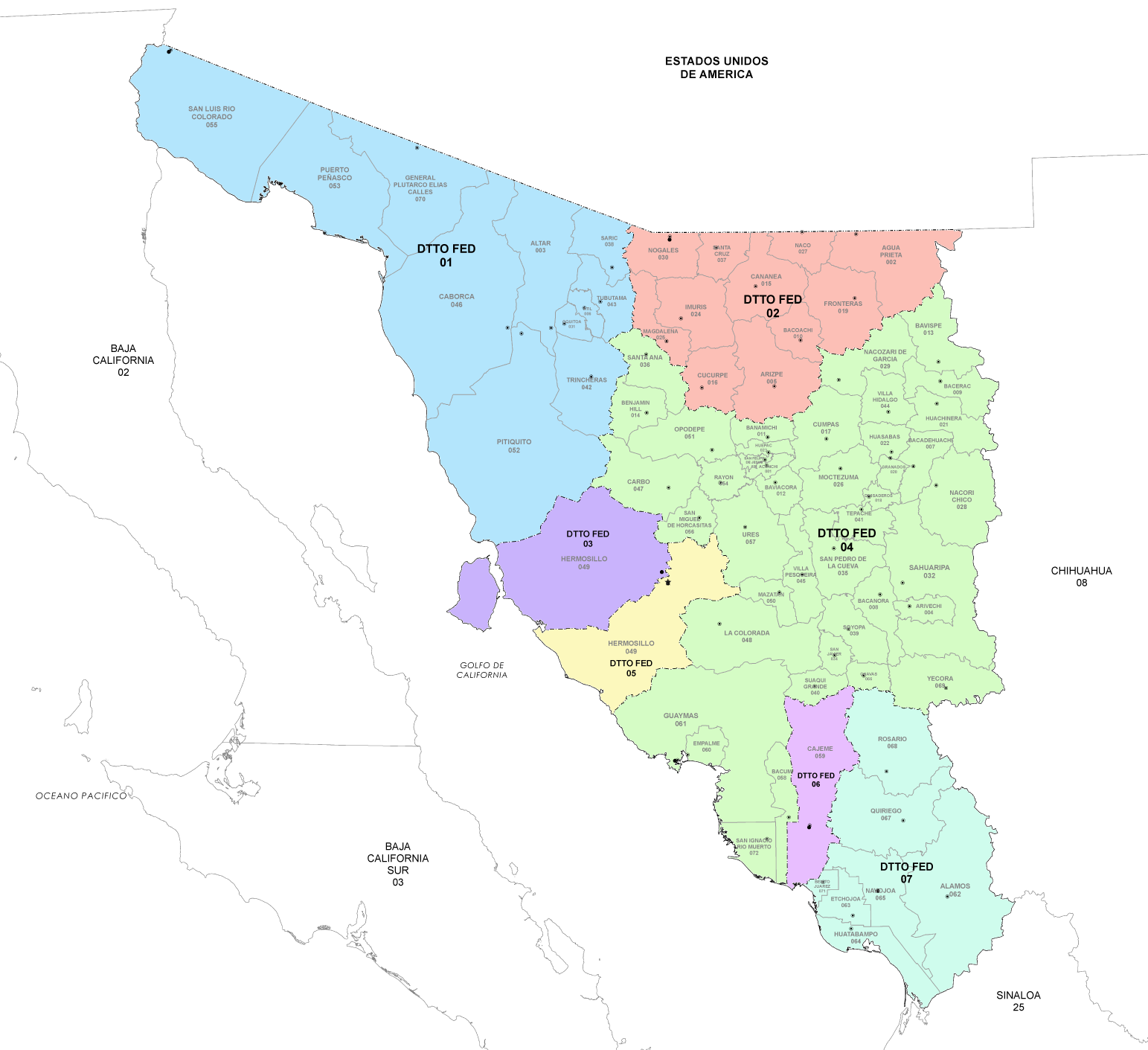
- 1st district since 2017

Incumbent
- Member: Manuel Baldenebro
- Party: ▌Morena
- Congress: 66th (2024–2027)

District
- State: Sonora
- Head town: San Luis Río Colorado
- Coordinates: 32°28′N 114°45′W
- Covers: 11 municipalities: Altar, Atil, Caborca, Oquitoa, Pitiquito, Plutarco Elías Calles, Puerto Peñasco, San Luis Río Colorado, Sáric, Trincheras, Tubutama
- PR region: First
- Precincts: 176
- Population: 389,127 (2020 census)

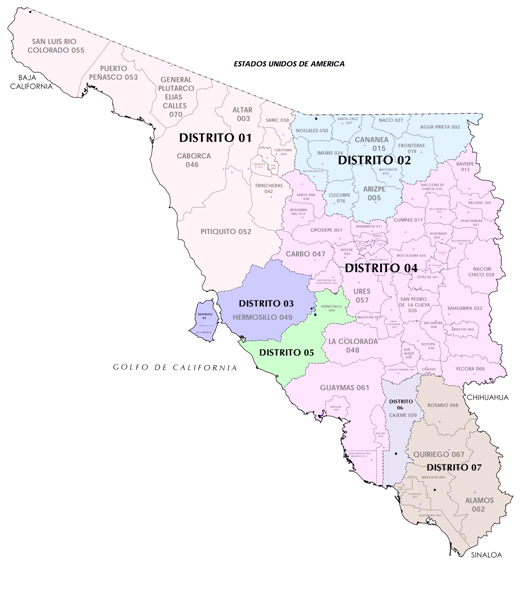
Sonora under the 2017–2022 districting plan

The 1st federal electoral district of Sonora (Spanish: Distrito electoral federal 01 de Sonora) is one of the 300 electoral districts into which Mexico is divided for elections to the federal Chamber of Deputies and one of seven such districts in the state of Sonora.

It elects one deputy to the lower house of Congress for each three-year legislative session by means of the first-past-the-post system. Votes cast in the district also count towards the calculation of proportional representation ("plurinominal") deputies elected from the first region.

The current member for the district, re-elected in the 2024 general election, is Manuel Baldenebro Arredondo of the National Regeneration Movement (Morena).

== District territory ==
Under the 2023 districting plan adopted by the National Electoral Institute (INE), which is to be used for the 2024, 2027 and 2030 federal elections, the first district comprises 176 electoral precincts (secciones electorales) across 11 municipalities in the state's north-west:

- Altar, Atil, Caborca, Oquitoa, Pitiquito, Plutarco Elías Calles, Puerto Peñasco, San Luis Río Colorado, Sáric, Trincheras and Tubutama.

The head town (cabecera distrital), where results from individual polling stations are gathered together and tallied, is the city of San Luis Río Colorado. The district reported a population of 389,127 in the 2020 census.

== Previous districting schemes ==
Evolution of electoral district numbers
	1974	1978	1996	2005	2017	2023
Sonora	4	7	7	7	7	7
Chamber of Deputies	196	300				

2017–2022

Between 2017 and 2022, the district had the same configuration as in the 2023 scheme.

2005–2017

Under the 2005 plan, the district covered 13 municipalities: the 2023's scheme's 11, plus Benjamín Hill and Santa Ana.

1996–2005

Under the 1996 districting plan, the head town was at San Luis Río Colorado and the district covered the state's north-west.

1978–1996

The districting scheme in force from 1978 to 1996 was the result of the 1977 electoral reforms, which increased the number of single-member seats in the Chamber of Deputies from 196 to 300. Under that plan, Sonora's seat allocation rose from four to seven. The 1st district had its head town at Magdalena de Kino and it covered 34 municipalities in the north of the state.

== Deputies returned to Congress ==
(Mexico) National parties
- Current
- PAN
- PRI
- PT
- PVEM
- MC
- Morena
- PAZ
- Somos
- Defunct or local only
- PLM
- PNR
- PRM
- PNM
- PP
- PPS
- PARM
- PFCRN
- CON
- PANAL
- PSD
- PES
- PES
- PRD

Sonora's 1st district
Election	Deputy	Party	Term	Legislature
1916	Luis G. Monzón		1916–1917	Constituent Congress of Querétaro
...
1976	Ricardo Castillo Peralta	Institutional Revolutionary Party	1976–1979	50th Congress
1979	Luis Antonio Bojórquez Serrano	Institutional Revolutionary Party	1979–1982	51st Congress
1982	Luis Héctor Ochoa Bercini	Institutional Revolutionary Party	1982–1985	52nd Congress
1985	Luis Donaldo Colosio Murrieta	Institutional Revolutionary Party	1985–1988	53rd Congress
1988	Armando López Nogales	Institutional Revolutionary Party	1988–1991	54th Congress
1991	Guillermo Hopkins Gamez	Institutional Revolutionary Party	1991–1994	55th Congress
1994	Daniel Trélles Iruretagoyena	Institutional Revolutionary Party	1994–1997	56th Congress
1997	Francisco Suárez Tánori	National Action Party (Mexico)	1997–2000	57th Congress
2000	Marcos Pérez Esquer	National Action Party (Mexico)	2000–2003	58th Congress
2003	Julio César Córdova	Institutional Revolutionary Party	2003–2006	59th Congress
2006	José Inés Palafox Núñez	National Action Party (Mexico)	2006–2009	60th Congress
2009	Leonardo Arturo Guillén Medina	National Action Party (Mexico)	2009–2012	61st Congress
2012	José Enrique Reina Lizárraga	National Action Party (Mexico)	2012–2015	62nd Congress
2015	José Everardo López Córdova	National Action Party (Mexico)	2015–2018	63rd Congress
2018	Manuel Baldenebro Arredondo	National Regeneration Movement	2018–2021	64th Congress
2021	Manuel Baldenebro Arredondo	National Regeneration Movement	2021–2024	65th Congress
2024	Manuel Baldenebro Arredondo	National Regeneration Movement	2024–2027	66th Congress

== Presidential elections ==
Sonora's 1st district
Election	District won by	Party or coalition	%
2018	Andrés Manuel López Obrador	Juntos Haremos Historia	57.4787
2024	Claudia Sheinbaum Pardo	Sigamos Haciendo Historia	61.3527
