= Lina Acosta Cid =

Mexican politician

Member of the Congress of Sonora from the 1st district
- In office 16 September 2015 – 15 September 2018
- Preceded by: José Everardo López Córdova
- Succeeded by: Jesús Alonso Montes Piña
- In office 3 March 2008 – 15 September 2009
- Preceded by: Florencio Díaz Armenta
- Succeeded by: Leslie Pantoja Hernández

Personal details
- Born: San Luis Río Colorado, Sonora, Mexico
- Citizenship: Mexican
- Party: PAN
- Spouse: Beltrán Rojas
- Education: Autonomous University of Baja California

Lina Acosta Cid is a Mexican politician affiliated with the National Action Party. She served in the LVIII and LXI Lesiglatures of the Congress of Sonora.

== Education and early career ==
A native of San Luis Río Colorado, Sonora, Acosta Cid earned a Licentiate in sociology from the Autonomous University of Baja California and a master's degree in criminology from the CETYS Mexicali campus. She began her career in the public service in 1991 at the INFONAVIT, beginning a lengthy career in government at the municipal, state and federal levels. After several years in Baja California, Acosta Cid returned to San Luis Río Colorado, where she served as the director of urban planning for the local government from 1997 to 2000. She also served as the executive secretary (and later administrative director) of the municipal council for public security.

== Political career ==
Acosta Cid officially joined the National Action Party (PAN) in 1999. In 2003, she lost an internal election to Inés Palafox Núñez for the PAN nomination to the Chamber of Deputies.

From 2006 to 2008, Acosta Cid served as Florencio Díaz Armenta's substitute deputy in the LVIII Legislature of the Congress of Sonora. On 19 February 2008, Díaz Armenta requested to be relieved of his duties in order to seek the PAN's nomination for Governor of Sonora in the 2009 state elections. Acosta Cid assumed the seat on 3 March, when the congress unanimously approved Díaz Armenta's resignation. She served out the rest of the term, which ended in September 2009. Acosta Cid subsequently worked for the Executive Secretary of Public Security as of 2014.

In the 2015 state elections, Acosta Cid won a seat representing the 1st district in the LXI Legislature of the Congress of Sonora, after receiving 42.7 percent of the vote. She had earned the PAN nomination earlier that year after winning an internal election by four votes. Acosta Cid served as president of the body and worked to further gender equality through legislation.

In January 2018, she announced her intention to run for a seat in the Chamber of Deputies representing Sonora's 1st federal district. However, the PAN state committee nominated her to represent the 2nd district of Puerto Peñasco in the state legislature. Acosta Cid received 26.9 percent of the vote, finishing in second place behind Lázaro Espinoza Mendívil of the Juntos Haremos Historia alliance. She went on to serve as the coordinator of mayors, síndicos and regidores in the PAN's state steering committee. In 2019, Acosta Cid was awarded the "Leona Vicario" medal by the San Luis Río Colorado chapter of the Mexican Association of Businesswomen.

In January 2021, Acosta Cid announced that she was once again running for a seat in the Chamber of Deputies representing Sonora's 1st federal district as a member of Va por México, an alliance between the PAN, the Institutional Revolutionary Party (PRI) and the Party of the Democratic Revolution (PRD). She campaigned in remote towns located on the edges of the district, such as Trincheras and Tubutama. Acosta Cid received 32.6 percent of the vote, finishing in second place behind Manuel Baldenebro Arredondo of Morena.
