= Santa Fe (Sonora) =

Santa Fe (Jesús Paz)
- Locality
- Location within Sonora Location within Mexico
- Coordinates: 30°50′35.311″N 111°33′46.953″W
- State: Mexico
- Municipality: Átil
- Elevation: 570 m (1,870 ft)

Population (2020)
  - Total: 2
- Time zone: UTC-7 (Zona Pacífico)
- Postal code: 83833
- Area code: 637

Santa Fe, also known as Jesús Paz, is a semi-deserted ejido located in the municipality of Átil in the northern part of the Mexican state of Sonora, within the Sonoran Desert. It is the fourth most populated locality in the municipality with only 2 inhabitants, according to the 2020 Census by the INEGI.

== Geography ==
Santa Fe (Jesús Paz) is 1,780 km northwest of Mexico City, the country's capital. The locality is situated at coordinates 30°50'35.311" N latitude, 111°33'46.953" W longitude, at an elevation of 570 meters above sea level.

Other cities near Santa Fe (Jesús Paz) include:

- Atil (612 inhabitants): 3 kilometers, west
- Tubutama (217 inhabitants): 14 km, northeast
- Alfonso Traslavinha (next to the stadium) (20 inhabitants): 15 km to the east
- El Rincon (23 residents): 17 km northeast
- La Reforma (158 inhabitants): 20 km northeast

== Population data for Santa Fe (Jesús Paz) ==
Population
Year	Total inhabitants
2020	2
2010	6
2005	1
