= Atil (disambiguation) =

Atil was the capital of Khazaria from the 8th–10th centuries.

Atil or Atıl may also refer to:

- Atıl İnaç (born 1975), Turkish film director
- Atıl Kutoğlu (born 1968), Turkish fashion designer
- Atil, Sonora, Mexico, a small town
  - Atil Municipality, containing the town
- Atil, early Ottoman Empire name for Attil, Suwayda
