= Sasabe =

Sasabe or Sasave may refer to the following:

== Places and jurisdictions ==
In Europe

- Sasabe, Aragon, a former town and bishopric in Aragon, Spain, now a Latin Catholic titular see
  - the Monastery of San Adrián de Sasabe, which remains there

In the Americas

- Sasabe, Arizona, a US town notable for:
  - Sasabe Port of Entry
- El Sásabe, Sonora, in Mexico, across the Arizona homonym

In Asia

- Sasabe Station (笹部駅, Sasabe-eki?), a train station in Kawanishi, Hyōgo Prefecture, Japan

== People with the surname ==
- Kiyoshi Sasabe (佐々部 清), Japanese film director
