= Arizona State Route 286 =

State highway in Pima County, Arizona

State Route 286
- Sasabe Road
- SR 286 highlighted in red

Route information
- Maintained by ADOT
- Length: 45.04 mi (72.48 km)
- Existed: 1955–present

Major junctions
- South end: Mexican border in Sasabe
- North end: SR 86 in Three Points

Location
- Country: United States
- State: Arizona

Highway system
- Arizona State Highway System; Interstate; US; State; Scenic Proposed; Former
← SR 280	→ SR 287

State Route 286 (SR 286) is a highway in southern Arizona that runs from its junction with State Route 86 west of Tucson to the U.S.-Mexico border at Sasabe. It is largely a north–south route.

== Route description ==
The southern terminus of SR 286 is located at the U.S.-Mexico border at Sasabe. The highway heads north from the border traversing a sparsely populated area and does not pass through any cities or towns aside from minor settlements. It provides access to the Buenos Aires National Wildlife Refuge as well as small settlements in Southern Arizona. Although it has a port of entry into El Sásabe, Sonora, Mexico, only dirt roads lead south of this location. The highway generally follows a north-northeast heading for the majority of its route. The northern terminus of the highway is located on SR 86 west of Tucson.

== History ==
An unpaved road connecting Sasabe to Tucson was built by 1935. The route received a designation as SR 286 in the 1950s. By 1963, a section of the route from SR 86 at the northern terminus to Palo Alto Ranch was paved.

== Junction list ==
The entire route is in Pima County.

Location	mie	km	Destinations	Notes
Sasabe	0.00	0.00	Sasabe Port of Entry	Southern terminus at the Mexico–United States border
Three Points	45.04	72.48	SR 86 – Ajo, Tucson	Northern terminus
1.000 mi = 1.609 km; 1.000 km = 0.621 mi
