= Leonardo Medina =

Leonardo Medina may refer to:

- Leonardo Medina (Uruguayan footballer) (born 1977), Uruguayan football manager and former player
- Leonardo Medina (Mexican football manager) (born 1970)
- Leonardo Guillén Medina, Mexican politician (born 1976)
