= 2018 Chimney Canyon shootout =

US–Mexico border incident

Coordinates: 31.4659°N 111.2406°W

- Date: 12 June 2018
- Location: Chimney Canyon, near Arivaca, Arizona, United States
- Outcome: 1 US Border Patrol agent wounded

On June 12, 2018, a shooting between a United States Border Patrol agent and alleged Mexican smugglers took place, in which the Border Patrol agent was wounded. The incident took place in a remote area in southern Arizona near the U.S.-Mexican Border, near the community of Arivaca, Arizona.

== Incident ==
An unidentified U.S. Border Patrol agent, alone and on foot, responded to an activated motion sensor at approximately 4:30 a.m. in Chimney Canyon, just north of the ghost town of Ruby, Arizona. Ruby is located along a well known smuggler's route that leads north from the Mexican border to Arivaca, a distance of about 10 miles. While investigating the activation, the agent was fired upon from multiple apparent sources, and was shot in one of his hands and one of his legs, and several times more in his bullet proof vest.

The agent returned fire and escaped the shooters, administered first aid to himself, and retreated to his patrol vehicle. The agent called for assistance, and was evacuated via helicopter. The agent was taken to a hospital, treated for his wounds, and was later reported to be in "stable condition and good spirits." The agent was a "21-year veteran of Border Patrol" and a trained paramedic.

A Border Patrol tactical team was also called into the area, and arrested several people for "immigration-related violations," but it was unclear whether any of them had connections to the shooting. The FBI was reportedly investigating the incident.

== Location ==
Local Arizona rancher and longtime resident, Jim Chilton, who owns a 50,000 acre plot of land in the immediate area, says the shootout occurred on his land, in an area known for drug smuggling and human trafficking from across the nearby Mexican border. He also said that his ranch contains over 200 trails, and that the shooting occurred on the most-traveled trail. The area is mountainous and rugged, and was featured in the 2015 documentary film Cartel Land.

== Reaction ==
Rep. Martha McSally (R-AZ) issued the following statement: "Relieved the U.S. Border Patrol Agent shot on duty this morning near Arivaca, AZ survived. Praying for full recovery & to find assailant. Thanks to the @CBPArizona team who responded so quickly. A reminder that border patrol agents & CBP officers are on the frontlines every day."

== See also ==
- 2010 Sáric shootout
