= Átil, Sonora =

Atil
- Town and Municipality
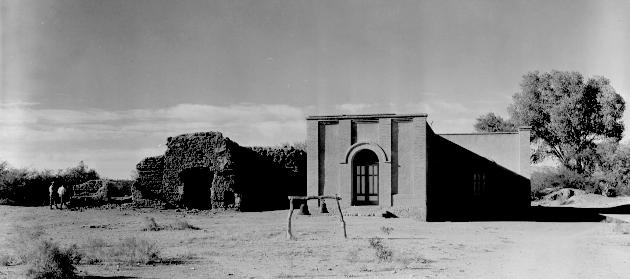
- Mission San Francisco de Atil

- Location in Mexico
- Coordinates: 30°50′37″N 111°35′1″W
- Country: Mexico
- State: Sonora
- Municipality: Atil
- Founded: 1751

Area
  - Total: 400.43 km^{2} (154.61 sq mi)

Population (2020)
  - Total: 612
  - Density: 672.52/km^{2} (1,741.8/sq mi)
- Time zone: UTC–07:00 (Zona Pacífico)
- Area code: +52 637

Átil is a small town in Átil Municipality in the northwest of the Mexican state of Sonora. The total area is 400.43 km^{2} and the population of the municipality was 734 in 2005, of whom 699 lived in the municipal seat (2000). Neighboring municipalities are Tubutama, Trincheras, Oquitoa, and Altar.

== History ==
The first inhabitants were Pima Alto or Nebome Indians, who before conversion had led a nomadic or semi-nomadic life. It is said that Átil means "Arrow Point", in the Pima language.

The town was founded in 1687 as a Jesuit mission called Los Siete Príncipes del Átil (The Seven Archangels of Átil). It was intermittently a visita of Mission San Pedro y San Pablo del Tubutama, and had Mission San Antonio Paduano de Oquitoa as a visita.

Some buildings were constructed by Jesuit missionary Jacobo Sedelmayer. The name of the mission was changed to San Francisco de Átil when the Franciscans arrived in 1768.

=== Missionaries ===
Missionaries stationed in Átil included:

- Ignaz Pfefferkorn (1756–1762)
- José Haffenrichter (1761–1762)
- Francisco Xavier Villarroya (1763)
- José Neve (1765)
- José Pío Laguna (1765–?)
- José Soler (1768–1774)
- Felipe Guillén (1773–1778)
- José María Espinosa (1773–1775)
- Juan P. Gorgol (1773–1787)
- Tomás Eixarch (1776–1781)
- Félix Gamarra (1777–1779)
- Juan Bautista Llorens (1787–1790)
- Francisco Moyano (1790–1817)
- Clemente Moreno (1789)
- Francisco Antonio Barbastro (1789)
- Pedro Amorós (1796)
- Ramón López (1797–1798)
- José Gómez (1797–1798)

== Geography ==
Átil is one of the smallest municipalities in the state.

The terrain is desert and mostly flat. Summer temperatures average 25.6 °C but daytime extremes are frequently above 40 °C. The winter average is 12.8 °C.

There is one tarmacked road crossing the municipality linking Altar with Tubutama. There are several dirt roads crossing the desert.

== Economy ==
The economy is based primarily on agriculture with lands irrigated by the Cuauhtémoc Reservoir located in the north of the municipality. Cattle raising is also practised.

== Other sources ==
- Enciclopedia de los Municipios de Mexico
- Instituto Nacional de Estadística, Geografia, e Informática (INEGI)

== See also ==
- Santa Teresa de Atil
