= Mescal Wash Site =

Archaeological site in Arizona

The Mescal Wash Site is an archaeological site in Pima County, Southeastern Arizona in the United States. It is located near Cienega Creek, situated in where the Sonoran and Chihuahuan Desert meet. Its environment consists of upland hills and grassland in the desert.

Mescal Wash was occupied by various cultural groups from the area such as Hohokam, Mogollon, Trincheras, and Sonoran indigenous groups over the span of 3,000 years from 1200 B.C to 1450 A.D. Mescal Wash Site was excavated after the land was surveyed before the construction of a proposed traffic interchange and highway overpass over the site. Its excavation took place from 2000-2016 by archaeologists who were supported by the Arizona Department of Transportation and Statistical Research Inc.

== People and occupation ==
Mescal Wash's occupation from 1200 B.C. to 1450 A.D. was confirmed by archaeomagnetic and carbon dating. The site was use by many people indigenous to Southeastern Arizona and Northern Sonora Mexico, including people from the Hohokam Culture as was determined by the style of house in pits located on the site. Non Hohokam artifacts have been found on the site that indicate trade and occupation from other cultural groups such as Trincheras, Apache and Mogollon.

By the mid 1800s Mescal Wash was known as Cienega de Los Pimas by nearby travelers, soldiers and colonialists passing through for shelter and camping. Rein Vanderpot has identified Mescal Wash Site as a “persistent” location because of its diverse ecology, resources, and occupation from different cultures. The indigenous groups occupied this area for its arable land, resources, and nearby water access from the San Pedro River. Its inhabitants lived as foragers, agriculturalists, and in a farmer rancheria lifestyle.

Mescal Wash contains no compound walls, ceremonial center, or courtyard but occupation was continual as the buildings show evidence of superimposition. They began as adobe structures and throughout the site's history steps and raised floors were added by new inhabitants. It contained Hohokam styled house in pits and circular pole and brush structures that were altered over time which indicate that people were influenced by the previous cultures and adopted some of the same culture.

Of the 2,314 features, 97 were structures considering that they were dispersed and lived in small households. The different groups that lived here influenced one another through pottery, reconstruction of site, and the exchange of goods such as ceramic, bone, and shells. The population always remained with small households reaching its population peak in 750 A.D.- 950 A.D.
