= Autonomous University of Baja California, Tijuana =

Autonomous University of Baja California, Otay Campus
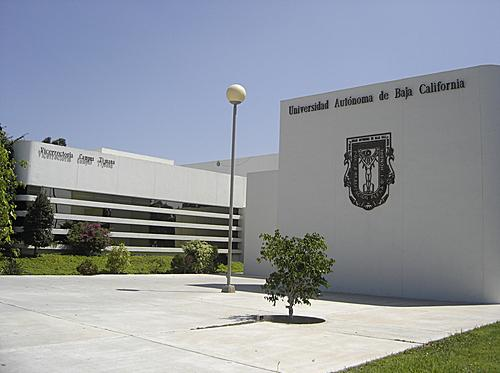
- UABC, Otay Campus
- Established: February 28, 1957
- Location: 32.53207°N 116.96457°W
- Website: http://www.tij.uabc.mx/

The Autonomous University of Baja California, Tijuana is one of three main campuses of the Autonomous University of Baja California (UABC), located in the Otay Centenario borough of Tijuana, Baja California state, México. It is a public research university.

== Sub-campuses ==
The Tijuana branch of the Autonomous University of Baja California maintains three sub-campuses in the Municipality of Tijuana, in the towns of:

- Tecate,
- Rosarito Beach
- Valle de las Palmas

== Departments ==
=== Chemistry Sciences and Engineering ===
Faculty of Chemistry Sciences and Engineering:

1. Industrial Chemistry
2. Chemistry Engineering
3. Engineering on Pharmacobiology
4. Engineering on Computer sciences
5. Engineering on Electronics
6. Industrial Engineering

=== Arts ===
Faculty of Arts:

1. Bachelor's degree on Plastic Arts
2. Bachelor's degree on Theater

=== Humanities and Social Sciences ===
Faculty of Humanities and Social Sciences:

1. Bachelor's degree in Hispanic Literature
2. Bachelor's degree in History
3. Bachelor's degree in Sociology
4. Bachelor's degree in Philosophy
5. Bachelor's degree in Communication
6. Bachelor's degree in Teacher on Literature
7. Bachelor's degree in Teacher on Mathematics

=== Tourism and Marketing ===
1. Bachelor's degree in Tourism
2. Bachelor's degree in Tourism Management
3. Bachelor's degree in Marketing

=== Architecture and Design ===
1. Bachelor's degree in Architecture
2. Bachelor's degree in Graphic Design
3. Bachelor's degree in Industrial Design

=== Law ===
1. Bachelor's degree in Law

=== Modern Languages ===
1. Bachelor's degree in Language Education
2. Bachelor's degree in Translation

=== Medicine and Psychology ===
1. Bachelor's degree in Medicine
2. Bachelor's degree in Psychology
3. Bachelor's degree in Nutrition

=== Dentistry ===
1. Bachelor's degree in Dental Surgery

=== Accounting and Business Administration ===
1. Bachelor's degree in Accounting
2. Bachelor's degree in Business Administration
3. Bachelor's degree in Information Systems
4. Bachelor's degree in International Business
