= Marcos Pérez Esquer =

Mexican politician

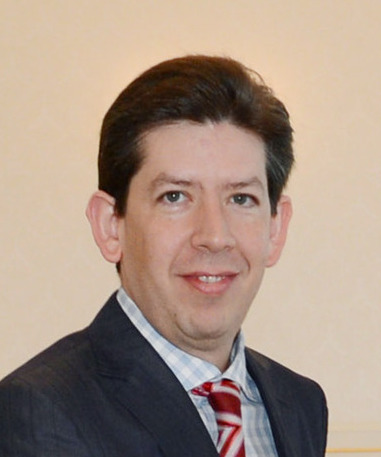
- Born: 25 July 1970 (age 55); San Luis Río Colorado, Sonora, Mexico
- Occupations: Lawyer & Politician
- Political party: National Action Party (Mexico)

Marcos Pérez Esquer (born 25 July 1970) is a Mexican lawyer & politician from the National Action Party (Mexico). He was elected to serve from 2000 to 2003 as a federal deputy in the 58th session of Congress, representing Sonora's first district, and from 2009 to 2012 he served as a plurinominal deputy for the first region in the 61st session of Congress.
