= Luis Fernando Rodríguez Ahumada =

Mexican politician

- Born: 12 September 1975 (age 50); Sonora, Mexico
- Occupation: Politician
- Political party: {Morena

Luis Fernando Rodríguez Ahumada (born 12 September 1975) is a Mexican politician from the National Action Party (PAN). From 2006 to 2009 he served as a federal deputy in the 60th Congress, representing Sonora's fifth district for the PAN.
