= Julio César Córdova Martínez =

Mexican politician

- Born: 23 March 1963 (age 63); Caborca, Sonora, Mexico
- Occupation: Politician
- Political party: PRI

Julio César Córdova Martínez (born 23 March 1963) is a Mexican politician affiliated with the Institutional Revolutionary Party (PRI). In the 2003 mid-terms he was elected to the Chamber of Deputies to represent Sonora's first district during the 59th session of Congress.
