= Autonomous University of Baja California =

University in northwestern Mexico

- Universidad Autónoma de Baja California
- Motto: Por la realización plena del ser
- Motto in English: For the full realization of being
- Type: Public university
- Established: 1957
- Affiliations: ANUIES CUMEX CONAHEC
- Endowment: US$144 million (MX$1.784 billion)
- President: Dr. Daniel Octavio Valdez Delgadillo
- Provost: Dr. Alfonso Vega
- Faculty: 4,939
- Administrative staff: 1,724
- Students: 54,000
- Undergraduates: 52,000
- Postgraduates: 2,000
- Location: Mexicali, Tijuana, Ensenada, Baja California, Mexico; 32°39′48.09″N 115°28′08.02″W
- Campus: 3 main campuses, 5 sub campuses, and 3 units of basic formation
- Colors: Green and gold
- Mascot: Bighorn Sheep
- Website: www.uabc.mx

The Autonomous University of Baja California (Spanish: Universidad Autónoma de Baja California, UABC) is a public institution of higher education in Baja California. Established in 1957, UABC has its headquarters located in the city of Mexicali.

The UABC has three main campuses in the cities of Ensenada, Mexicali, and Tijuana. UABC maintains five sub campuses in the cities of Rosarito, San Quintin, Tecate, Valle Dorado in Ensenada, and the suburban region of Valle de Las Palmas in Tijuana. The institution also operates three Units of Basic Formation in the cities of San Felipe, Ciudad Morelos, and Guadalupe Victoria.

Under the Subsecretary of Higher Education, UABC is mainly funded by the General Management of Higher Learning Institutions (DGESU), a part of the nation's eight-tier public higher education system, which also includes the General Coordination of Technological Universities (CGUT), the General Management of Technological Higher Learning (DGEST), the General Management of Higher Learning for Educators (DGESPE), the General Management of Professions (DGP), the Copyrights National Institute (INDAUTOR), the National Pedagogical University (UPN), and the Coordination of Polytechnic Universities (CUP).

UABC follows Mexico's higher education format: tronco común (general education requirements), técnico superior (associate degree), licenciatura (bachelor's degree), maestria (master's degree), and doctorado (doctorate).

== History ==
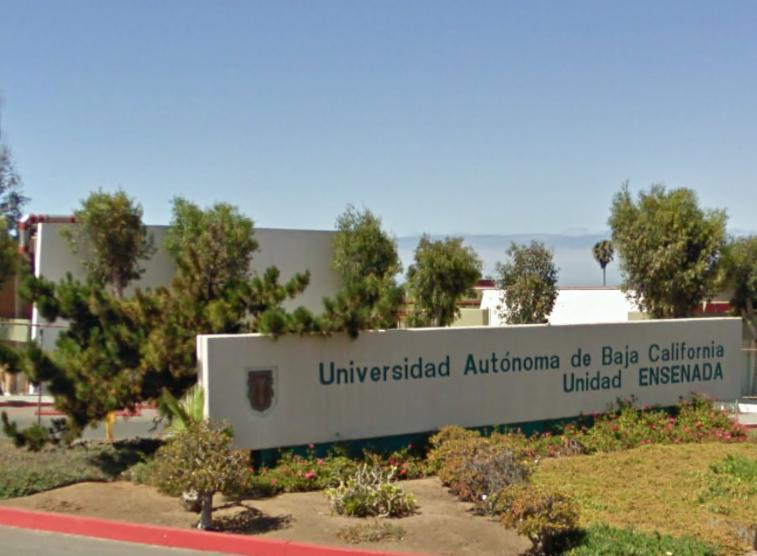
UABC Ensenada Campus

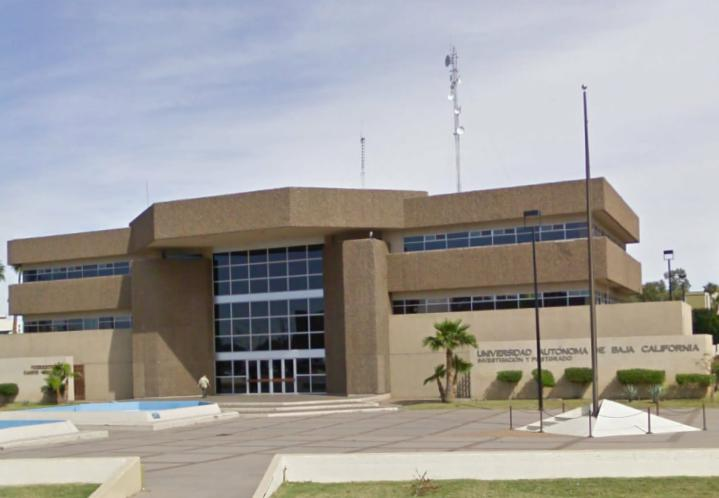
UABC Mexicali Campus

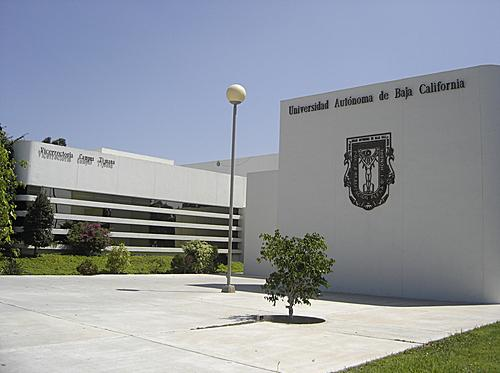
UABC Tijuana Campus

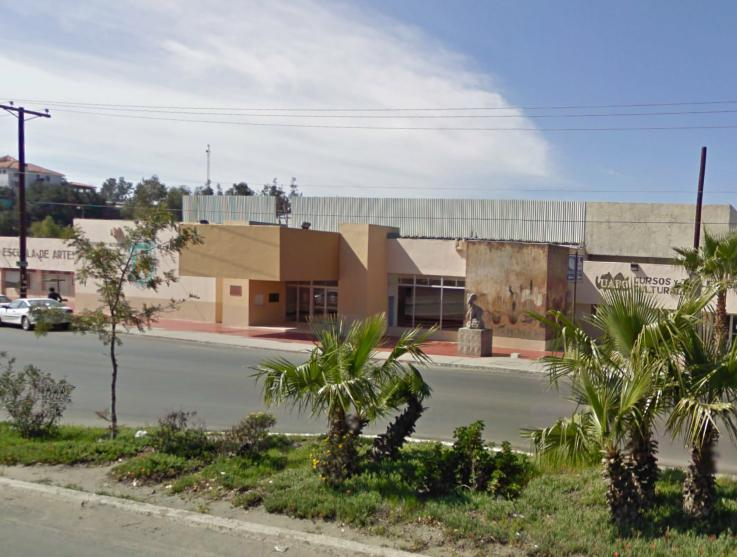
UABC Tecate Campus

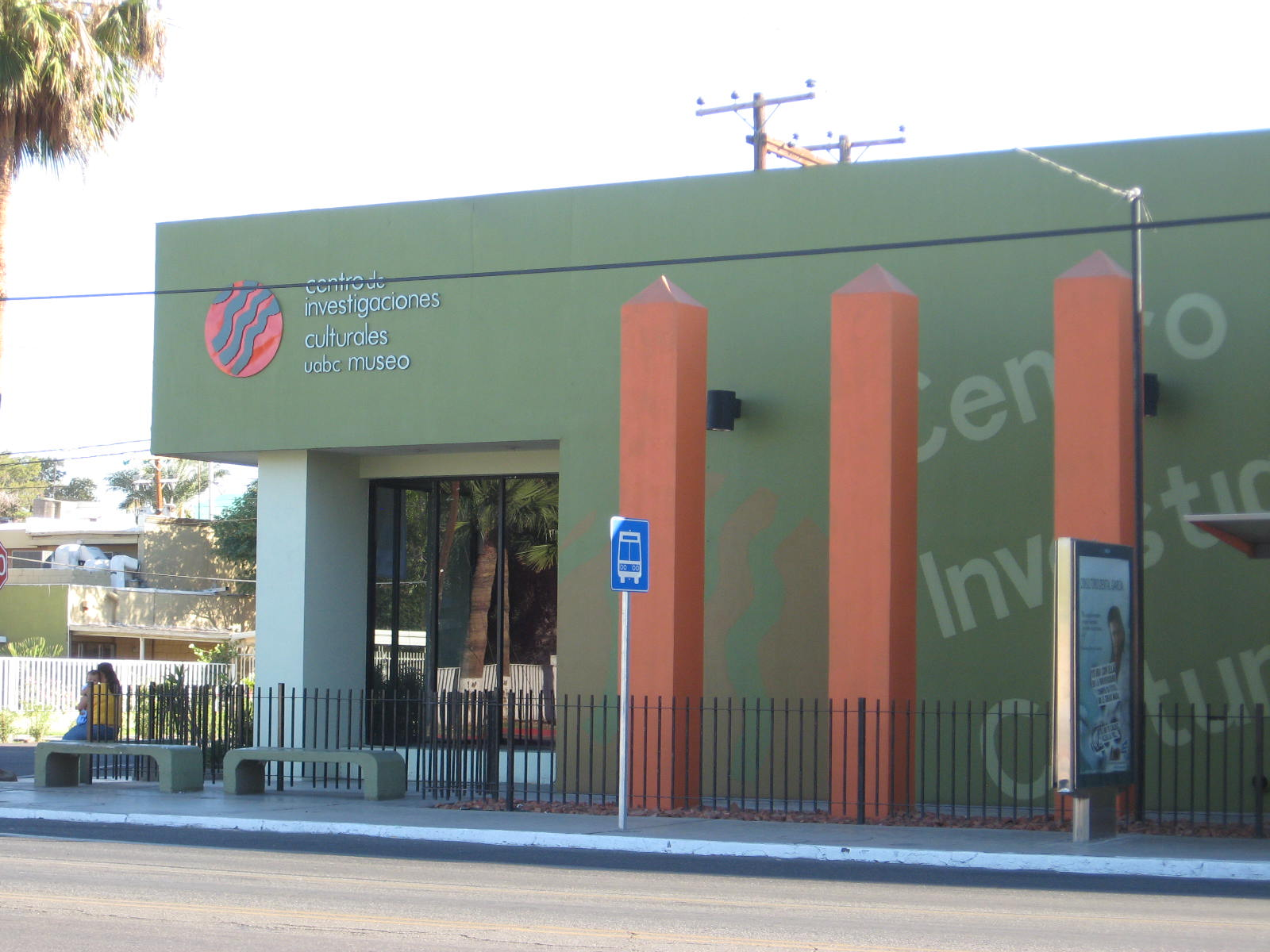
UABC Research Cultural Museum in Mexicali.

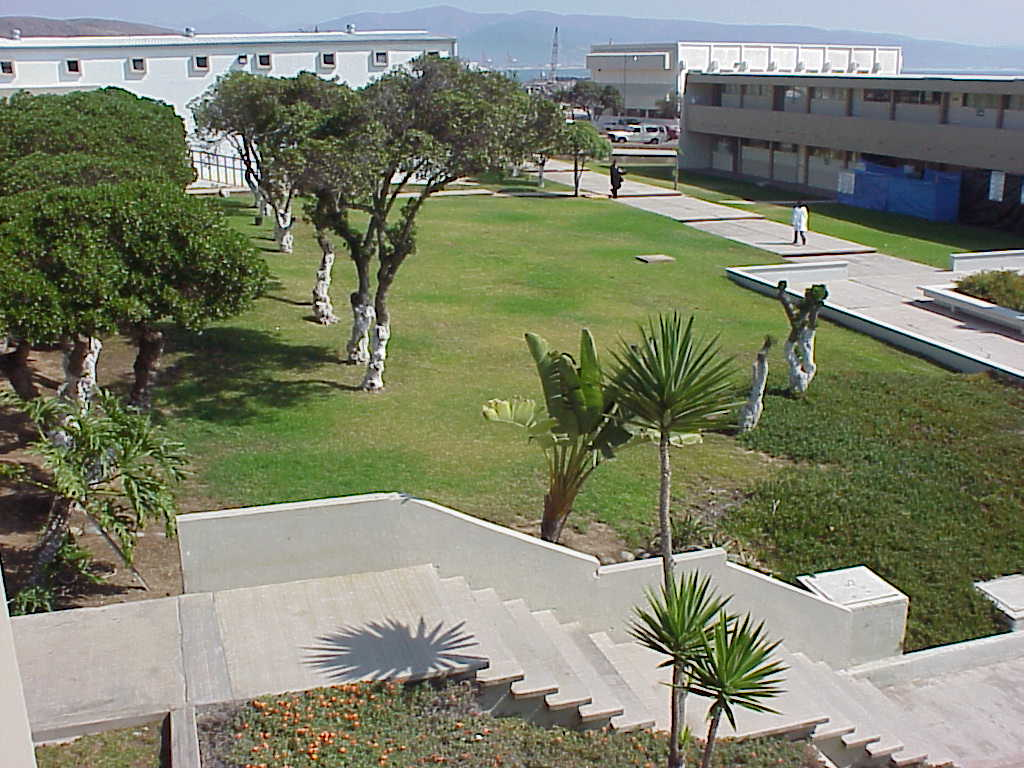
College of Marine Science of the UABC-Ensenada

The Autonomous University of Baja California (UABC) was officially formed on February 28, 1957, by organic law declaration as the result of a movement initiated by a group of professionals, businesspersons, scholars, and students.

This law establishes the principles in which the university was conceived: as a public service institution, separating it from the state's administration but with full judicial capacity. It assigns the goal of promoting high school and higher education to create professionals, promote scientific research and extend the benefits of culture enrichment. The law also establishes that in order to achieve such goals, the university is inspired under the principles of freedom of religion and freedom to explore, with the purposes of gathering the flowing scientific and social minds, without engaging in political, pro-militant activities.

On August 2 of the same year, the Pro University State Committee was formed and in 1959, the first university president was elected. A year later, the schools of Pedagogy, Marine Science, and a high school were formed in Tijuana.

Between 1961 and 1962, the Schools of Economics and Commerce and Administration were incorporated in Tijuana, as well as a high school in Tecate. In 1969, the School of Tourism was created. Between 1971 and 1979, the School of Medicine, Odontology and Chemical Sciences were formed. In 1986, the School of Humanities was born and in 1989, the School of Engineering was built in Tecate.

Between October 1980 and January 1981, UABC was the stage of a strike movement carried out by faculty, staff and students in an effort to improve the democratic academic process and labor conditions within the university and the region. The movement had mixed results where protests turned to riots eventually leading to the involvement of the government and police forces. Some students, staff, and faculty were forced to leave the university.

=== Recent History ===
The Tijuana Campus was formally established in 2003 as a result of aiming to expand the academic offerings and reach needs of the region.

Today UABC exerts a fair amount of academic influence in the regional and even national scenery. It is one of the major universities in Mexico. It is composed of 3 campuses, 5 sub-campuses and 3 Units of Basic Formation.

== Governance ==
Although the Autonomous University of Baja California (UABC) is a public institution of higher education, it is not under the control of the state's governmental administration, and possesses the complete legal authority to carry out its core functions: instruction; research, cultural diffusion and community service. As defined by the university's organic law, UABC is a public service institution, decentralized from the state's administration, endowed with full autonomy, judicial personality and its own assets.

=== Administration ===
Administration of the UABC takes place in the form of a shared governance model where the entire institution is headed by a Governing Board, known as the Junta de Gobierno, as vested by the institution's own fundamental law. A University Council, known as the Consejo Universitario serves as the collegial authority responsible of enforcing all rules and regulations established to allow the organized functionality of all administrative, staff/faculty and student affairs. A Board of Trustees, known as Patronato Universitario serves as the chief accountant of the institution overseeing expenditures, inventory, and accountability of all resources and assets within the institution. Student Government affairs take place in what is known as Tribunal Universitario and oversees all issues affecting the student body, including decisions and actions taken by the university governing body.

All administrative departments and operations in the UABC offices are under the final authority of the Rector and each campus operations are under the final authority of their Vice Rector, who reports to the Rector. The Governing Board is the final level of authority for all functions within the UABC. Article 19 of UABC's organic law establishes the chain of command as follow:

I. Governing Board (Junta de Gobierno); II. University Council (Consejo Universitario); III. Rector; IV. Board of Trustees (Patronato Universitario); V. Deans of Academic Departments, Schools, and Institutions (Directores de Facultades, Escuelas e Institutos); VI. Investigative and Technical Councils (Consejos Técnicos y de Investigación); and VII. University Court (Tribunal Universitario).

=== Junta de Gobierno ===
The Autonomous University of Baja California (UABC) is governed by an eleven-member Governing Board (Junta de Gobierno). Governing Board membership is of life tenure and may only end upon resignation, impeachment, disability, or mandatory retirement. Vacancies may be filled under the advice and consent of the University Council. The Governing Board is headed by a President who may serve for one year and reelected once for the same term length; and a Secretary appointed by the President under the advice and consent of the rest of the Board and may serve for as long as permitted by the Board. The Governing Board is responsible for establishing policies that govern all activities related to conducting the business of the University as a whole, its individual campuses, and overall executive decisions.

==== Current Governing Board Members ====
- Luis Lloréns Báez, President
- Margarito Quintero Núñez, Secretary
- Leonel S. Cota Araiza
- Luis Javier Garavito Elías
- José Román Lizarraga Arciniega
- Fernando Abelardo Jiménez Codinach
- Héctor Baro Angulo
- Alejandro Mungaray Lagarda
- Tonatiuh Guillén López
- Rosa Imelda Rojas Caldelas
- Martín Francisco Montaño Gómez

=== Consejo Universitario ===
The University Council (Consejo Universitario) is composed of the university's Rector (Mexicali) who serves as President of the Council and the two Vice Rectors (Ensenada and Tijuana) who serve as Vice Presidents. The Deans of all academic departments (Directores de facultades) and students of each department form part of the Council. The Council's responsibility is the development and review of policies and procedures concerning the University, its staff, faculty and student body and present them to the Governing Board. As defined by the university's organic law, the University Council is the collegial authority responsible to expedite all rules and general dispositions aimed for better organization and technical functionality of faculty and staff administration; to know of all matters concerning the institution as prescribed by its law; and of issues not directly under the disposition of an authority of the University.

=== Patronato Universitario ===
The Board of Trustees (Patronato Universitario) has four members, elected to six-year terms through vote majority by the Governing Board. The candidates are presented by Baja California's state governor through ternary ballots of citizens of the municipalities of Ensenada, Mexicali, Tecate and Tijuana. Trustee members are entitled for reelection and their service is without monetary retribution. Current trustees are serving from 2008 to 2014. Board of Trustees members serve as administrators of the university's resources, assets, and services and account for their appropriate use and distribution.

=== Tribunal Universitario ===
Student representation takes form through the University Court (Tribunal Universitario) which serves as guardianship of student affairs, their rights and protections as vested by the University's organic law. The University Court is composed of three head judges elected by student members of the University Council under the consent of the rest of the Council; and a stand-in judge to serve during the absence of any of the judges. The Judges elect a President within themselves who then appoints a Secretary in charge of Court operations. The University Court summons the institution's governing body whenever a conflict concerning students arises and through analysis, discussion, and vote, an agreement is reached.

The University Rector, based in the city of Mexicali, serves as the institution's chief executive officer, its legal representative and as President of the University Council. The Rector is responsible for carrying out the policies approved by the Governing Board, maintain leadership in the institution and maintain informed the governing body of all university progress, challenges, services and issues. A Rector must be a natural-born Mexican, and is appointed by the Governing Board for a 4-year term. Rectors are ineligible for reelection.

=== Vice Rectors ===
The Vice Rectors, based in the cities of Ensenada, Mexicali, and Tijuana act as the institutional chief of each campus and they report to the Rector. Vice Rectors are responsible for the day-to-day operation of the total per-campus program and provide leadership and coordination for the campus they oversee. The Vice Rectors and Rector provide overall leadership and authority on all of the functional areas.

== Campuses ==
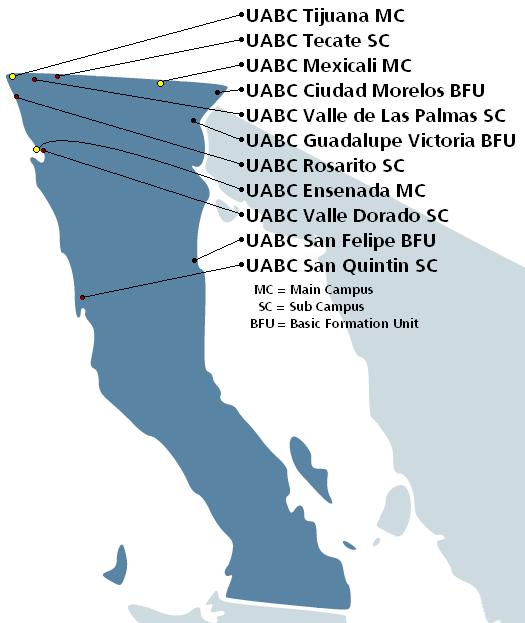
This map shows the locations of the three UABC main campuses, the five sub campuses and the three Basic Formation Units in the state of Baja California.

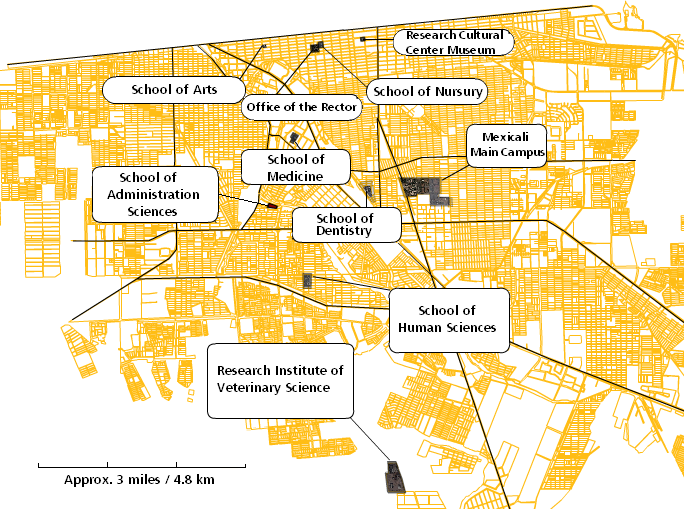
This map shows the physical locations of all ten UABC facilities in Mexicali, including the main campus, the Office of the Rectory, and its Schools around the city.

The Autonomous University of Baja California (UABC) has three main campuses, five sub campuses and three Units of Basic Formation outside the three 3 main facilities.

=== UABC Mexicali Campus ===
The Autonomous University of Baja California, Campus Mexicali is the main campus of the UABC. It has several Academic Units across the city, and houses the majority of UABC's majors.

Also, the Mexicali campus includes 3 "Units of Basic Formation" located in 3 remote cities of the municipality of Mexicali.

- Mexicali (main)

San Felipe (Unit of Basic Formation)
Ciudad Morelos (Unit of Basic Formation)
Guadalupe Victoria (Unit of Basic Formation)

=== UABC Tijuana Campus ===
The Autonomous University of Baja California, Campus Tijuana, is a public research university campus located in the Mesa de Otay borough of eastern Tijuana.

- Tijuana campus

Tecate (Sub-campus)
Rosarito (Sub-campus)
Valle De Las Palmas (Sub-campus)

=== UABC Ensenada Campus ===
The Autonomous University of Baja California, Campus Ensenada is known for being the oceanographic research center in Mexico with its College of Marine science and its Institute for Oceanographic Research, which publishes its own international research journal. The address for this campus is Km. 103 Carretera Ensenada-Tijuana C.P. 22800.

It is also located across the Centro de Investigación Científica y de Educación Superior de Ensenada (CICESE). The Ensenada-Tijuana Highway separates the Ensenada campus and the CICESE.

- Ensenada

El Sauzal (Sub-campus)
Valle Dorado (Sub-campus)
San Quintin (Sub-campus)

== Alumni ==
- Lina Acosta Cid - Mexican Politician
