= Héctor Larios Córdova =

Mexican politician (born 1954)

- Born: 22 December 1954 (age 71); Guadalajara, Jalisco, Mexico
- Occupation: Senator
- Political party: National Action Party

Héctor Larios Córdova (born 22 December 1954) is a Mexican politician affiliated with the National Action Party (PAN). He currently serves as Senator of the LXII Legislature of the Mexican Congress. He also served as Senator during the LVIII and LIX Legislatures and as Deputy in the LVII (Sonora's fifth district) and LX Legislatures, as well as a local deputy in the Congress of Sonora.
