= Leslie Pantoja Hernández =

Mexican politician

Member of the Chamber of Deputies Plurinominal
- In office 1 September 2012 – 31 August 2015

Member of the Congress of Sonora from the 1st district
- In office 16 September 2009 – 2012
- Preceded by: Lina Acosta Cid
- Succeeded by: José Everardo López Córdova

Personal details
- Born: 25 August 1976 (age 50) Mexicali, Baja California, Mexico
- Party: PAN
- Education: CETYS

Leslie Pantoja Hernández (born 25 August 1976) is a Mexican politician affiliated with the National Action Party (PAN). She served as a federal deputy of the LXII Legislature of the Mexican Congress representing Sonora, and previously served as a local deputy in the LIX Legislature of the Congress of Sonora.

A native of Mexicali, Pantoja earned her degree in business administration from the Centro de Enseñanza Técnica y Superior (CETYS) in 1997. She entered the public sector in 2000 and served as a regidora for San Luis Río Colorado Municipality from 2006 to 2009.
