= Sáric Municipality =

Sáric
- Municipality
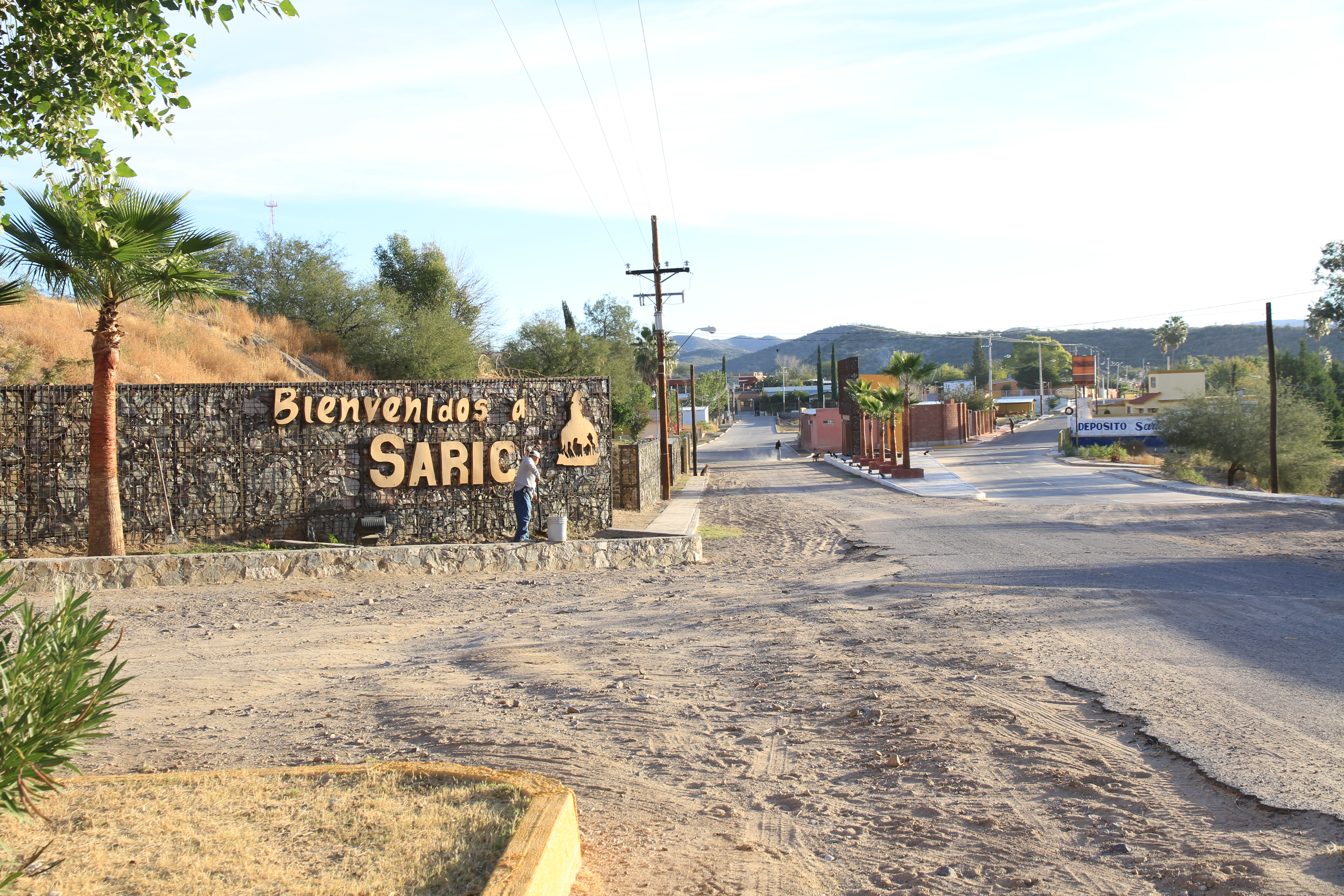

- Coat of arms

- Location of the municipality in Sonora
- Country: Mexico
- State: Sonora
- Seat: Sáric
- Established: 1934

Government
  - Municipal President: Fidel Lizárraga Celaya

Area
  - Total: 1,676.23 km^{2} (647.20 sq mi)
- Elevation: 300–1,500 m (980–4,920 ft)

Population (2005)
  - Total: 2,703
- Time zone: UTC–07:00 (Zona Pacífico)
- Area code: +52 637

Sáric is a municipality in the state of Sonora in north-western Mexico. Its northern boundary is the U.S. state of Arizona. The population of the municipality (urban and rural areas) was 2,703 in 2010 living in an area of 1,676.23 km^{2} (647.20 sq mi). The elevation is around 800 meters. At the city of Sáric, the municipal seat, it is 780 meters.

== Name ==
The Spanish name of the town derives from the O'odham name, Ṣaʼalk, which means "mountain pass".

== Geography ==
Boundaries are with Pima County and Santa Cruz County in the U.S. state of Arizona to the north; Nogales to the east; Tubutama to the south; Altar to the west; and Magdalena de Kino to the southeast.

The only settlements of over 100 population were Sáric (892) 31°06′11″N 111°22′40″W, El Sásabe (1,295) 31°28′19″N 111°32′39″W, and Cierro Prieto (353) 31°01′13″N 111°23′43″W, as enumerated in the 2010 census. There is an international border crossing leading to Sasabe, Arizona.

The land is high desert with extreme temperatures in the summer months. The Altar River has its source north of the municipality in the Arizona mountains and flows south.

== Economy ==
The desert lands are poor and agriculture can only be practiced in the Altar River valley where wheat, corn, alfalfa, sorghum, and rye grass are grown. Extensive cattle raising is carried out.
