= Gustavo Adolfo de Unanue =

Mexican lawyer and politician

- Born: 17 October 1973 (age 52); Puebla, Mexico
- Education: University of Hermosillo
- Occupations: Lawyer and politician
- Political party: PAN

Gustavo Adolfo de Unanue Aguirre (born 17 October 1973) is a Mexican lawyer and politician affiliated with the National Action Party (PAN). In 2003–2006 he served as a federal deputy in the 59th Congress, representing Sonora's fifth district. He was also elected as a local deputy to the 56th session of the Congress of Sonora.
