= Oquitoa Municipality =

Coordinates: 30.7494°N 111.7125°W

Oquitoa
- Municipality
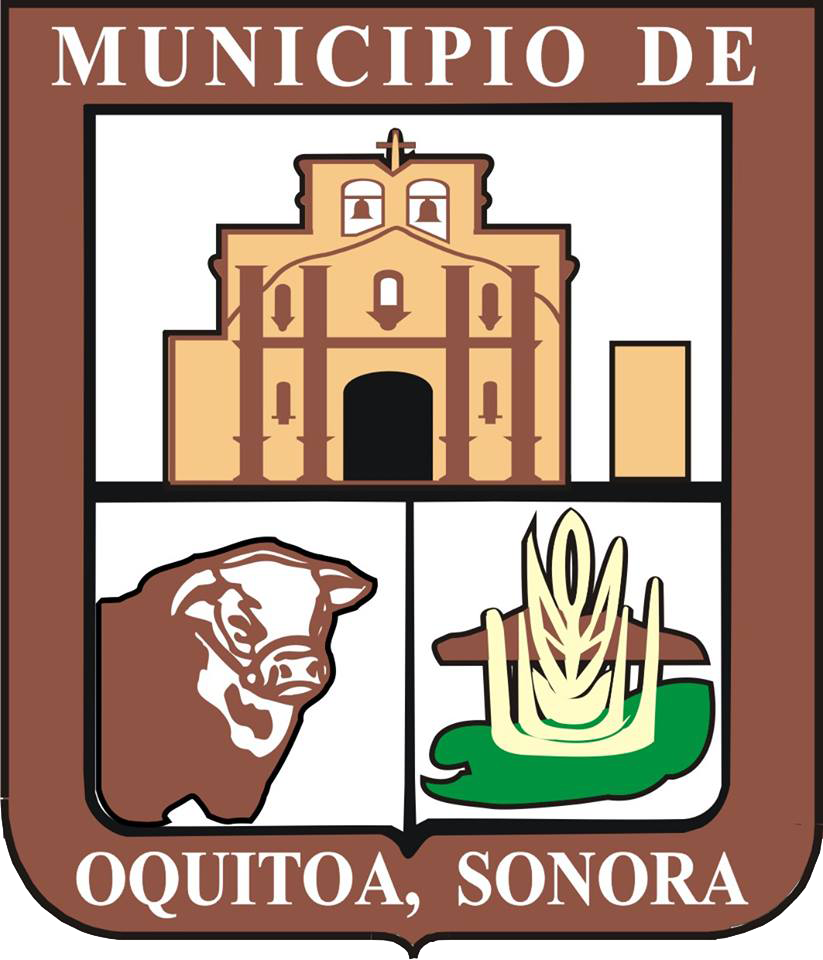
- Coat of arms

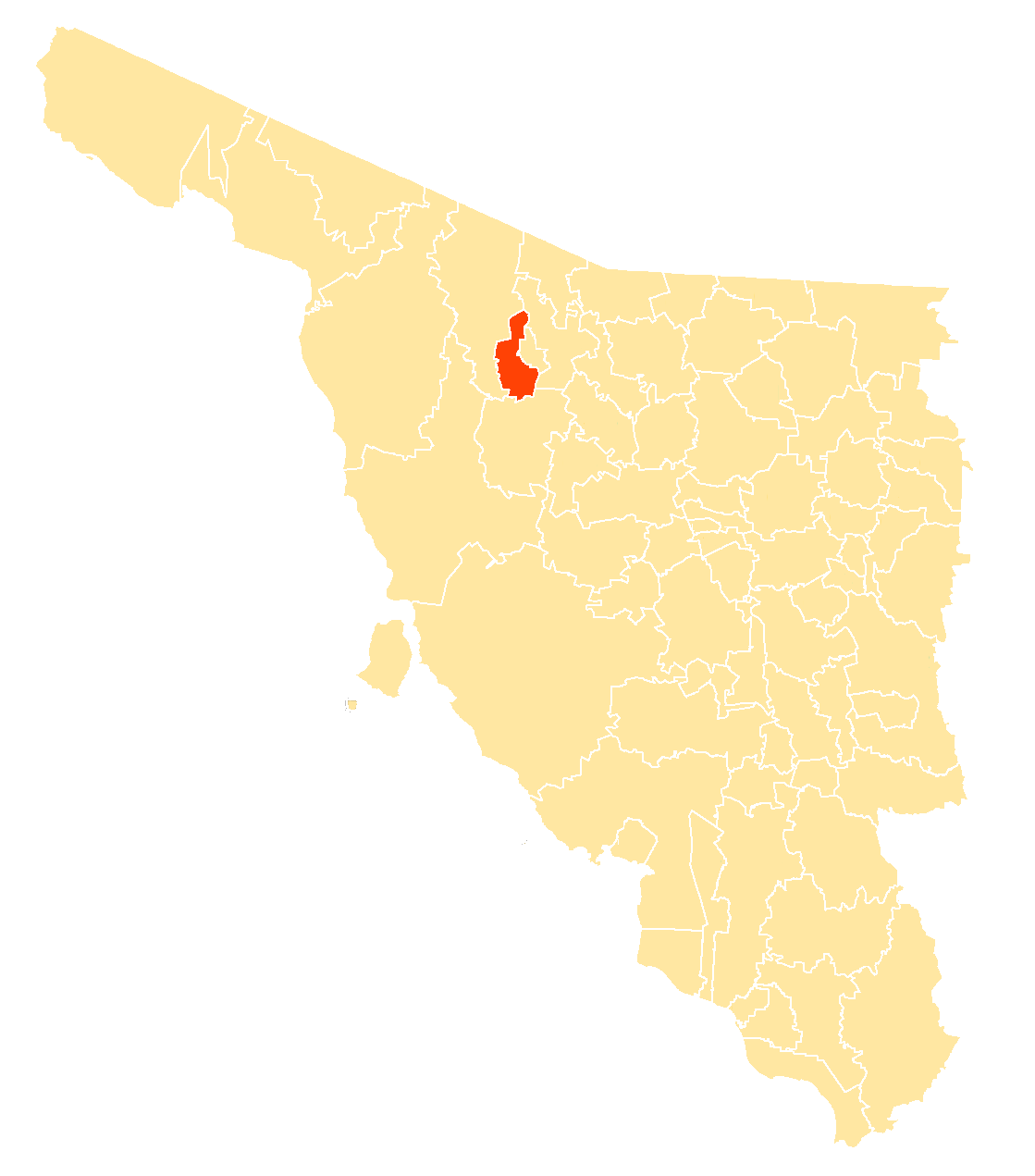
- Location of the municipality in Sonora
- Country: Mexico
- State: Sonora
- Seat: Oquitoa
- Time zone: UTC–07:00 (Zona Pacífico)

Oquitoa is a municipality in the state of Sonora in north-western Mexico. The municipal seat is at Oquitoa.

== Area and population ==
The municipal area is 636.64 km^{2} with a population of 402 registered in 2000. Most of this population lives in the small municipal seat. It is located at an elevation of 579 meters.

== Neighboring municipalities ==
Neighboring municipalities are Atil to the northeast, Trincheras to the southeast, and Altar to the west.
