= 2010 Sáric shootout =

Organized crime conflict in Mexico

- Part of the Mexican drug war
Date	1 July 2010
Location	Sáric, Sonora, Mexico

Belligerents
Beltrán-Leyva Cartel	Sinaloa Cartel

Casualties and losses
- 21 killed 6 wounded

On 1 July 2010, members of two rival cartels clashed near the village of Sáric, in Mexico's northwestern state of Sonora, approximately 12 miles southeast of the little-used port of entry in Sasabe, Arizona. Local news media and officials in the Mexican government reported that the violence was the result of an ambush, organized by a group aligned with the Beltrán-Leyva Cartel to stop a convoy of over 50 vehicles of the Sinaloa Cartel from entering Sáric. The Beltrán-Leyva group took up positions on a hill along the road outside of Sáric, and as the convoy approached, laid down a devastating barrage of fire into the convoy below. Shortly after the fighting ended, Mexican police and military arrived to find the bodies of 21 dead and several bullet-strewn vehicles, mostly SUVs. Nine men were taken into police custody, six of whom received wounds in the shootout.

== See also ==
- Mexican drug war
