= Inés Palafox Núñez =

Mexican politician (1960–2018)

- Born: 14 September 1960; Zacatecas, Mexico
- Died: 6 July 2018 (aged 57)
- Occupation: Politician
- Political party: PAN
- Spouse: Carmen Chío de Palafox
- Children: 3

José Inés Palafox Núñez (14 September 1960 – 6 July 2018) was a Mexican politician from the National Action Party (PAN). From 2006 to 2009 he served in the Chamber of Deputies representing Sonora's first district during the 60th Congress.

Born in Zacatecas, he moved to San Luis Río Colorado as a child. He served as a local deputy in the LV Legislature of the Congress of Sonora from 1997 to 2000 before becoming municipal president of San Luis Río Colorado.
