= Leonardo Guillén Medina =

Mexican politician

- Born: 26 October 1976 (age 49); San Luis Río Colorado, Mexico
- Occupation: Politician
- Political party: PAN

Leonardo Guillén Medina (born 26 October 1976) is a Mexican politician from the National Action Party (PAN). In the 2009 mid-terms he was elected to the Chamber of Deputies to represent Sonora's first district during the 61st session of Congress.
