= Pitiquito =

- Town and Municipality
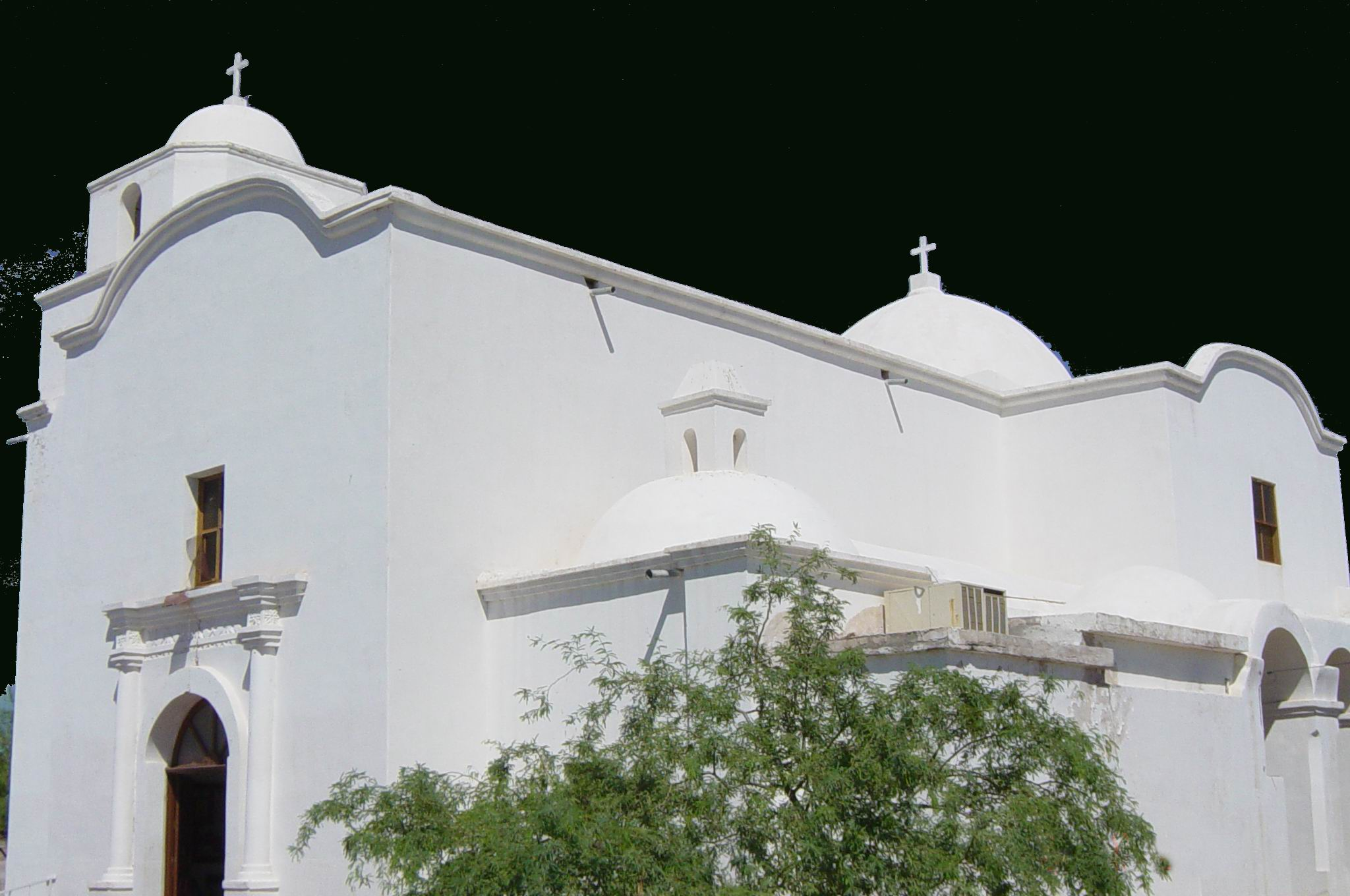
- Misión de San Diego, Pitiquito

- Location within Mexico
- Coordinates: 30°44′N 111°44′W
- Country: Mexico
- State: Sonora
- Municipality: Pitiquito
- Town founded: 1694
- Municipality established: 1914

Government
  - Mayor: Gumercindo Ruiz Lizárraga (2006-09)

Area
  - Total: 11,979.96 km^{2} (4,625.49 sq mi)
- Elevation: 305 m (1,001 ft)

Population (2005)
  - Total: 9,236
- (municipal total)
- Time zone: UTC–07:00 (Zona Pacífico)
- Area code: +52 637

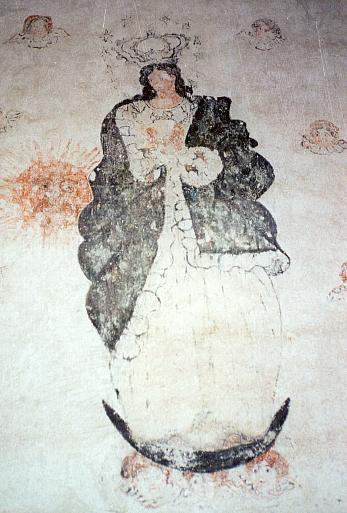
One of the 19th century murals at the Pitiquito church

Pitiquito is a small town in Pitiquito Municipality in the northwest of the Mexican state of Sonora.

== Area and population ==
The municipal area is 11,979.96 km^{2} which makes up 6.46% of the state total. The municipal population counted in 2000 was 9,160. The population of the main settlement and municipal seat was 4,862 in 2000. It is located at an elevation of 305 meters.

== Communities ==
Puerto Libertad (Sonora)

== Climate ==
In this region the climate is hot and dry with rainfall between 75 and 200 mm a year. Between December and February nighttime temperatures can drop to 8.5 °C below zero while from June to August they can reach 49.5 °C.

== History ==
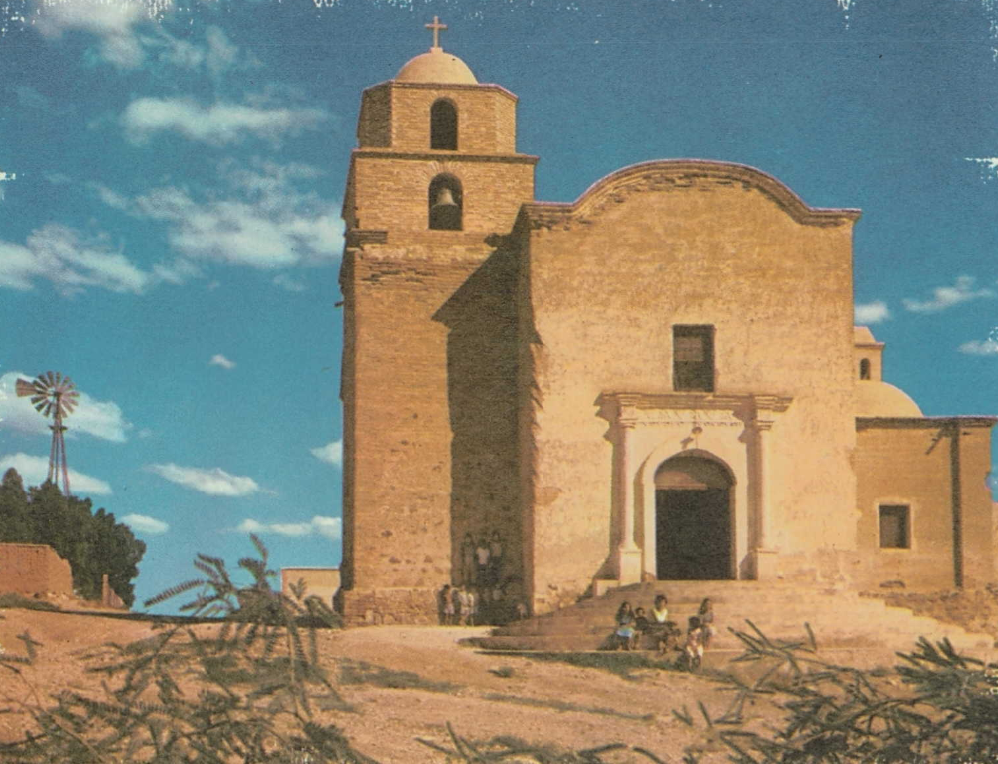
Mission of Pitiquito in 1961

When the Spanish arrived the area was populated by various sedentary tribes settled along the banks of the Altar and Magdalena rivers. According to local tradition the location took the name of an Indian chief called "Piti" or "Pitic".

The mission at Pitiquito was founded by Eusebio Francisco Kino in 1694 with the name of Natividad del Señor de Pitiquin. It was a visita of Mission La Purísima Concepción de Nuestra Señora de Caborca.

In 1768 the Franciscans took over the churches and the name was changed to San Diego de Pitiquin.

The town became a municipality in 1914.

== Economic activity ==
Agriculture covered 6,901 hectares (2000), most of which were irrigated by pumping from wells. Main crops are alfalfa, beans, corn, grapes, sorghum, and the production of fodder for the cattle industry.

Cattle raising is also important with over 30,000 head counted in (2000).

Since this municipality has approximately 170 kilometers of coastline there is also fishing, especially in the settlements of Puerto Libertad and Desemboque. The Mexican power generation parastatal CFE has a large electric plant at Puerto Libertad. A Mexican alternative energy company Biofields is constructing an algae to ethanol system covering several square miles which will process the exhaust from the electric plant.

== Tourist sights ==
Of touristic importance is the San Diego del Pitiquito mission, which sits in the center of town. . It is the oldest church with surviving indigenous art in Sonora. The drawings are rough, bold, black lines on a white background. They were discovered after being hidden under whitewash for ages.

The small beach communities along the Gulf of California are also of interest and are yet to be developed. Puerto de la Libertad is the most important and is situated on a paved highway from Hermosillo. It has an attractive bay with fine sand beaches and gentle waves, which invite visitors for practicing aquatic sports such as swimming, sailing and angling. Nearby are the only boojum (Spanish cirio) forests outside Baja California.

The beach town of El Desemboque is a Seri Indian town on the Seri communal property which is partially in the municipality of Pitiquito.
