= Oquitoa =

Town in Sonora, Mexico

Coordinates: 30°44′N 111°44′W

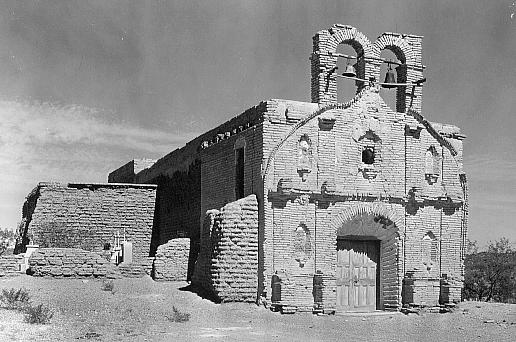
Mission San Antonio Paduano del Oquitoa, historic photo

Oquitoa is a small town surrounded by Oquitoa Municipality in the northwest of the Mexican state of Sonora.

== Etymology ==
One theory is that the name Oquitoa means "white woman" in the Piman language. Another, taken from the 1910 publication "New Trails in Mexico" by Karl Lumholtz is that the name Oquitoa is taken from the O'odham or Piman Phrase, Hukit'o, "next to" or "nearby"(Lumholtz, p. 391, 1990) in reference to the nearby San Ignacio river. Louis Alphonse Pinart's Vocabulario de la Lengua Papaga, 1897, collected in Pitiquito Sonora Mexico from Trinidad Peralta and the Papago governor, Mattias Parra of the Papago community of Pitiquito corroborates Lumholtz's definition of Oquitoa as "hukit'o" Oks Toha, or Oquitoa as defined by the first theory as white woman, literally means 'woman white' that even in the structure of Piman grammar is awkward and is therefore highly unlikely.

== History ==
Mission San Antonio Paduano de Oquitoa was founded in 1689 by the Jesuit missionary Eusebio Kino. As a Jesuit mission, it was at various times a visita of Tubutama or Átil; later, under the Franciscans, it was an independent mission.

The church apparently had a facelift by the Franciscans between 1788 and 1797, and was restored in 1920. Today, it is the only still-used church in the region of Jesuit (pre-1767) construction. Oquitoa is considered by many to be the gem of the Kino missions. This simple adobe hall church stands atop a small hill in the midst of the village cemetery.

Missionaries stationed at Oquitoa included Francisco Moyano (1795–?), Matías Creo (1813–?), and Juan Maldonado (1831).

== Health and education ==
There were only two primary schools and one doctor in a small health clinic in 2000.

== Economic activity ==
Agriculture covered 901 hectares (2000), most of which were not irrigated. Main crops are alfalfa, beans, corn and the production of fodder for the cattle industry.

Cattle raising was carried out by most of the work force (2000).
