= Pitiquito Municipality =

Pitiquito
- Municipality
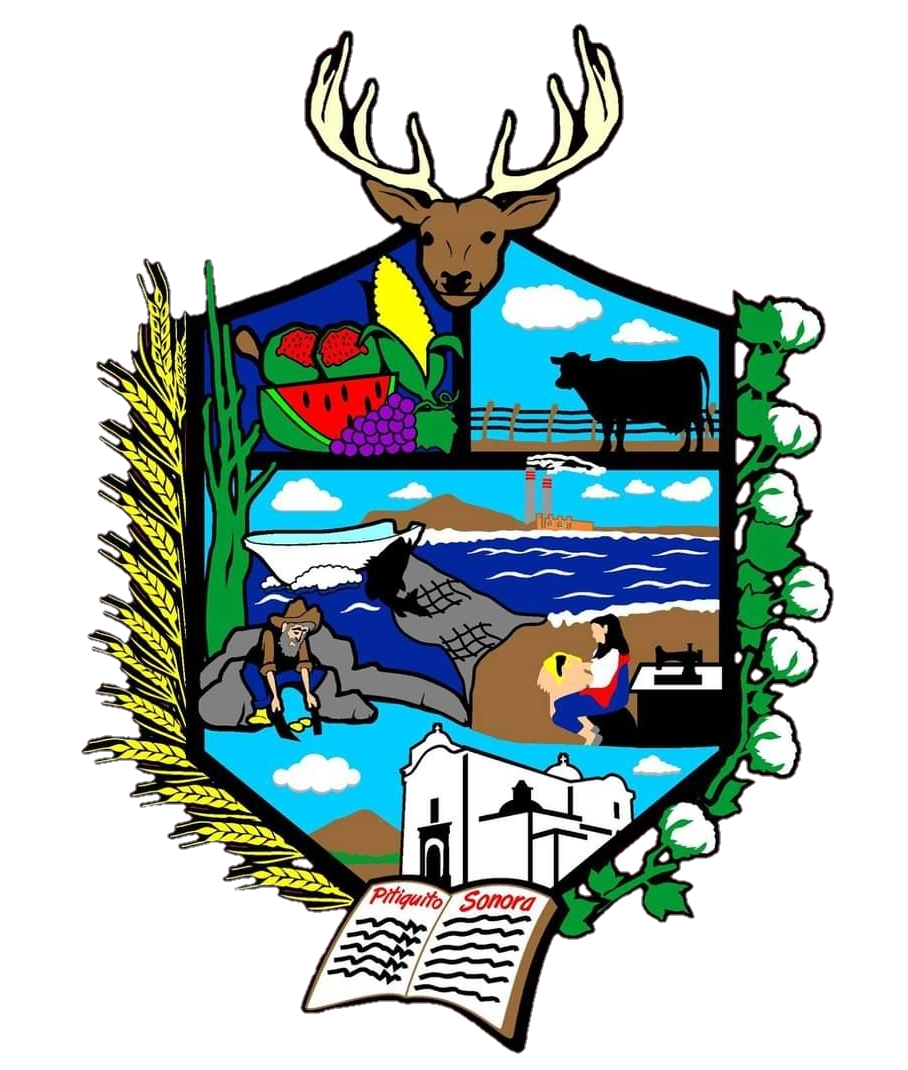
- Coat of arms

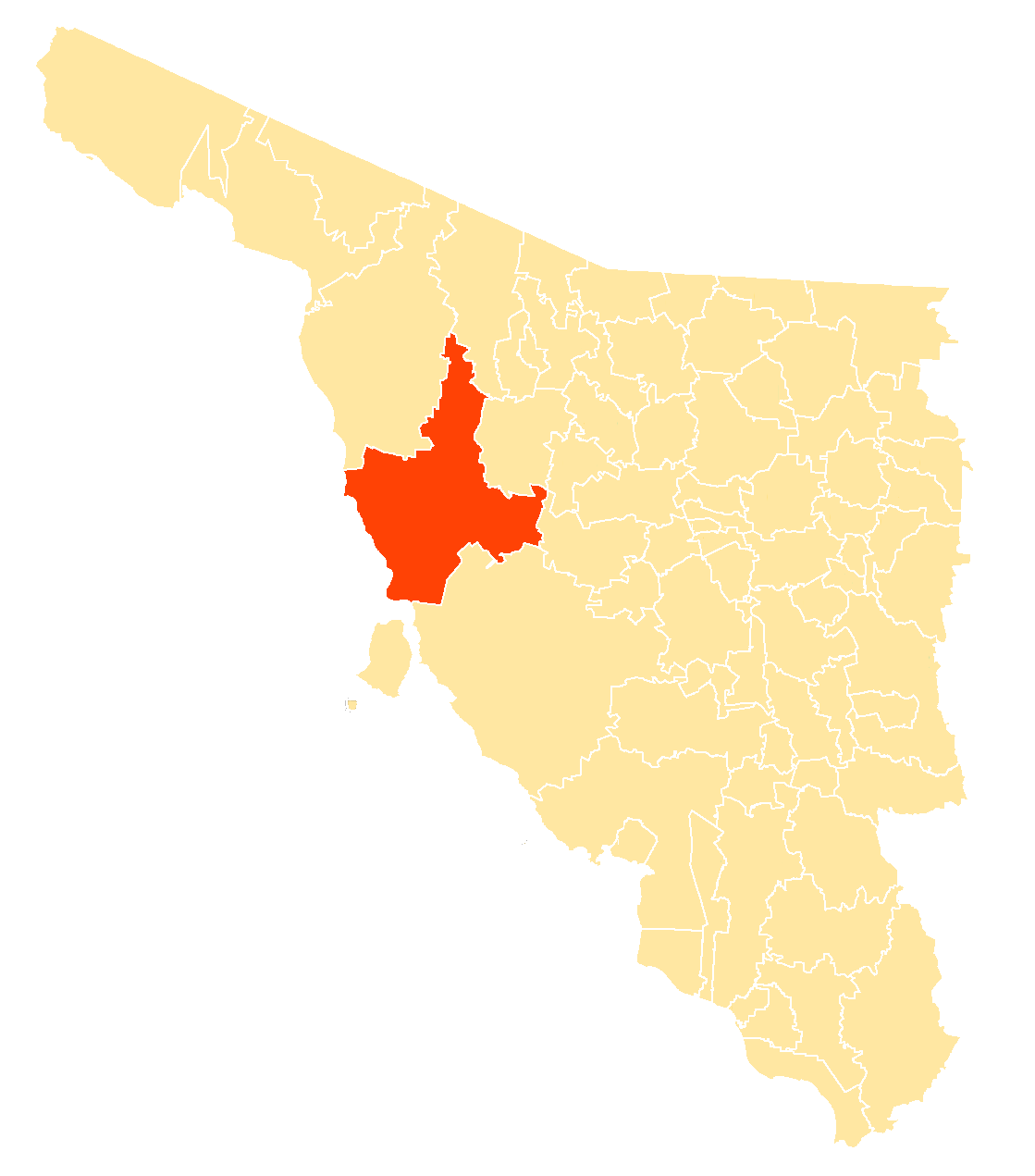
- Location of the municipality in Sonora.
- Coordinates: 30°40′38″N 112°3′18″W
- Country: Mexico
- State: Sonora
- Municipal Seat: Pitiquito
- Created: 1914

Government
  - Municipal President: Janeth Mazón García

Area
  - Total: 11,979.96 km^{2} (4,625.49 sq mi)
- Elevation (Median): 517 m (1,696 ft)

Population (2010)
  - Total: 9,468
  - Density: 0.79/km^{2} (2.0/sq mi)
- Time zone: UTC–07:00 (Zona Pacífico)
- Area code: +52 637

Pitiquito is a municipality in the state of Sonora in north-western Mexico. The municipal seat is at Pitiquito.

== Neighboring municipalities ==
Neighboring municipalities are Altar to the northwest, Hermosillo to the south, Trincheras to the east, and Caborca and the Gulf of California to the west. The town of Pitiquito is located in the north of the municipality on Federal Highway 2.

== Localities ==
There are 328 localities, the largest of which are:

Locality	Population
Total Municipality	9,468
Pitiquito	5,410
Puerto Libertad	2,782
Desemboque de los Seris (El Desemboque)	287
La Estación (Estación Pitiquito)	201
Félix Gómez (El Dipo)	176
