= Sasabe Port of Entry =

Border crossing between Mexico and the U.S.

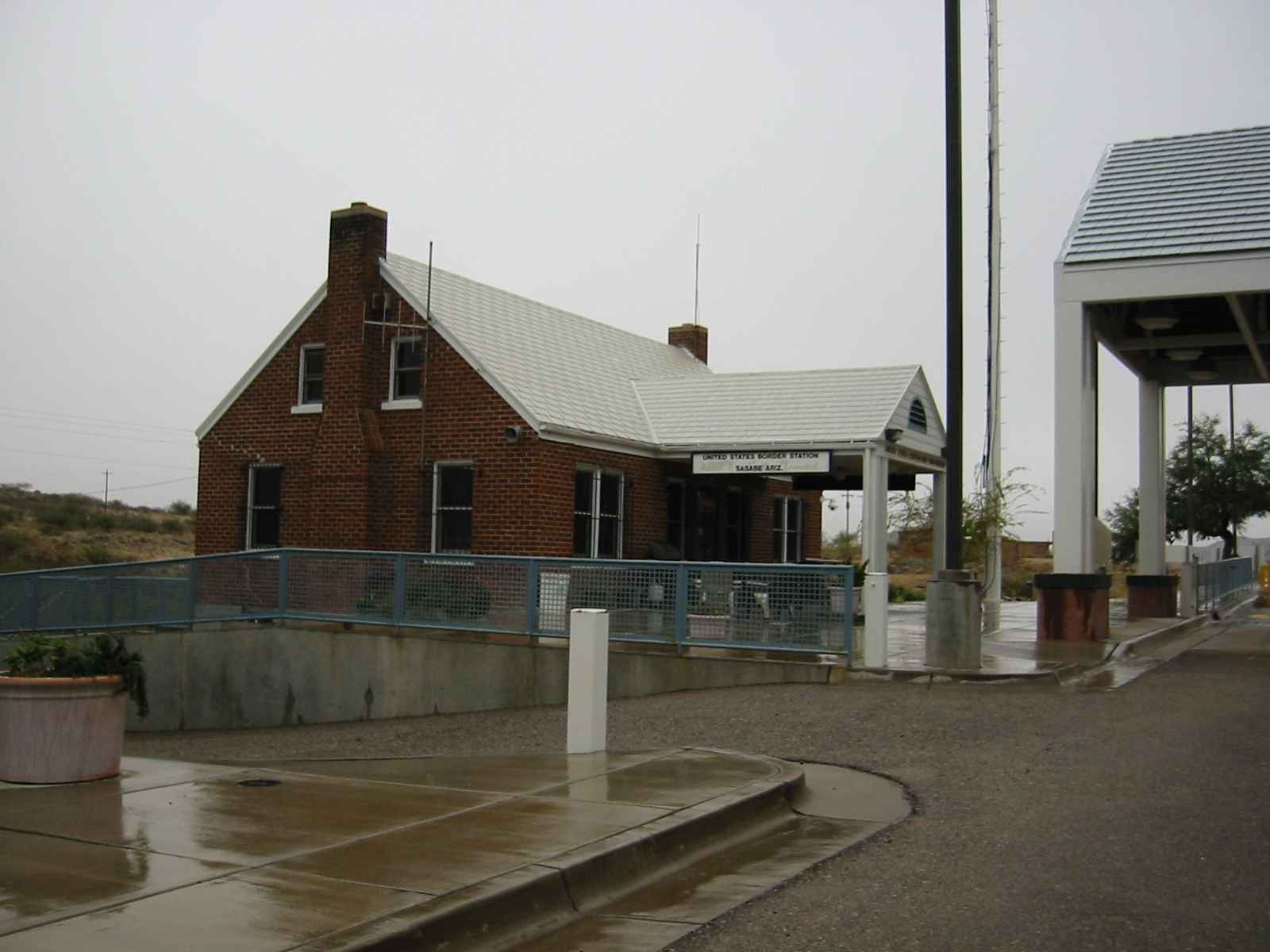
- Sasabe Arizona historic Border Inspection Station

Location
- Country: United States
- Location: SR 286 and International Border, Sasabe, Arizona 85633
- Coordinates: 31.483269°N 111.544318°W

Details
- Opened: 1916

Statistics
- 2011 Cars: 15,071
- 2011 Trucks: 278
- Pedestrians: 1,016

Website
- www.cbp.gov/contact/ports/sasabe
- U.S. Inspection Station-Sasabe, Arizona
- U.S. National Register of Historic Places
- MPS: U.S. Border Inspection Stations MPS
- NRHP reference No.: 14000243
- Added to NRHP: May 22, 2014

The Sasabe, Arizona Port of Entry has been in existence since 1916, and was substantially renovated during the early 1990s. During the renovation, the historic 1930s-era border station, which was listed on the U.S. National Register of Historic Places in 2014, was preserved as office space. Sasabe is the least-trafficked crossing in Arizona.

== See also ==
- List of Mexico–United States border crossings
