= Altar, Sonora =

Altar
- City
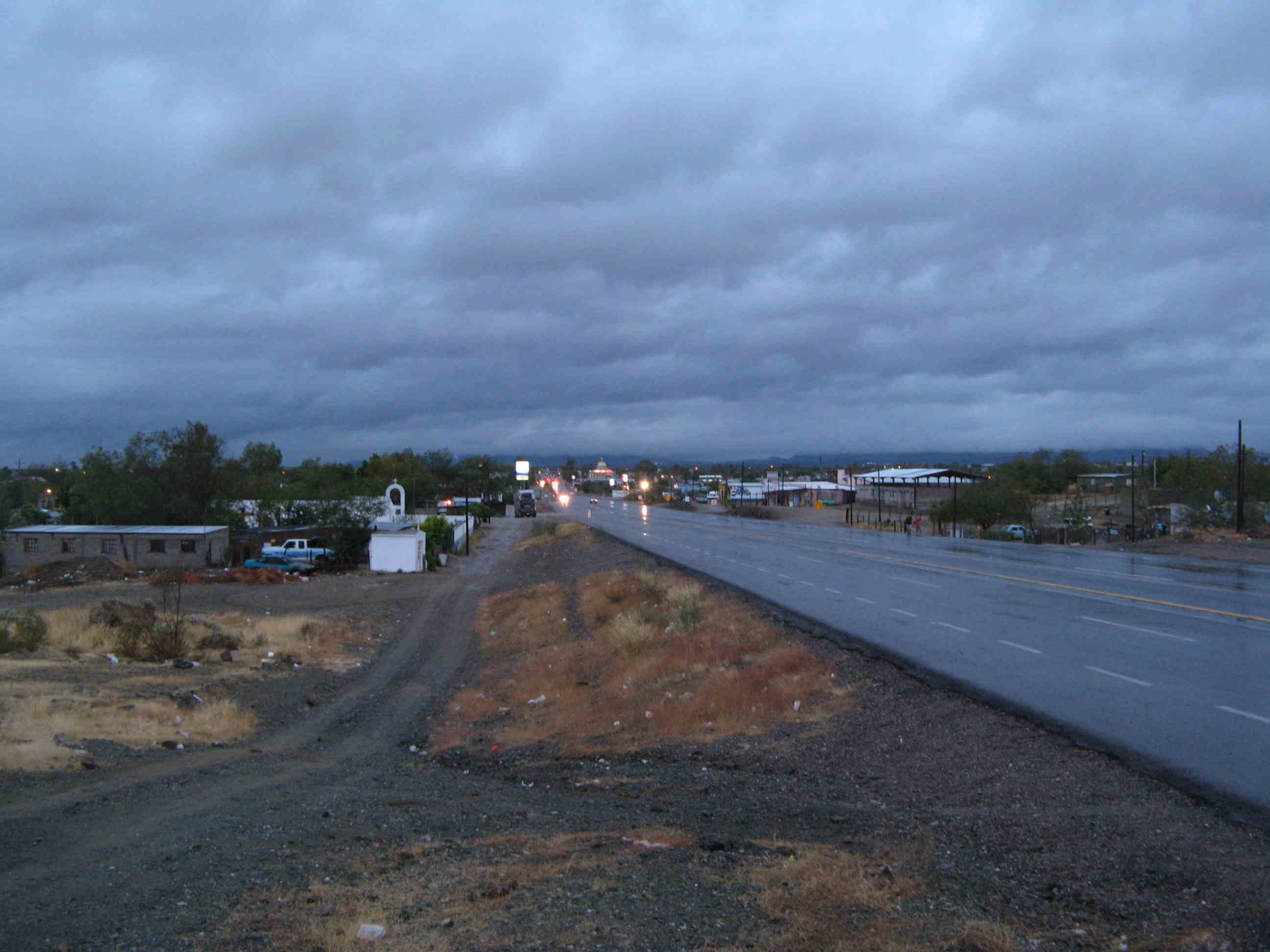

- Location in Mexico Altar (Mexico)
- Coordinates: 30°42′49″N 111°50′07″W
- Country: Mexico
- State: Sonora
- Municipality: Altar Municipality
- Founded: 1775
- Elevation: 420 m (1,380 ft)

Population (2020)
  - Total: 8,439
  - Density: 2,004.51/km^{2} (5,191.7/sq mi)
- Time zone: UTC–07:00 (Zona Pacífico)
- Area code: +52 637

Altar (O'odham: Wawuk) is small city and municipal seat of Altar Municipality in the Mexican state of Sonora. It is located in the northwest region of the state at 30°42′49″N 111°50′07″W.

== Geography ==
The town of Altar is situated on the important Mexicali to Hermosillo Highway (Federal Highway 2).

=== Climate ===
Climate data for Altar, Sonora (1951–2010)
Month	Jan	Feb	Mar	Apr	May	Jun	Jul	Aug	Sep	Oct	Nov	Dec	Year
Record high °C (°F)	33.0 (91.4)	36.8 (98.2)	39.5 (103.1)	43.0 (109.4)	46.6 (115.9)	47.8 (118.0)	47.8 (118.0)	47.2 (117.0)	45.6 (114.1)	45.5 (113.9)	46.5 (115.7)	40.5 (104.9)	47.8 (118.0)
Mean daily maximum °C (°F)	21.7 (71.1)	24.1 (75.4)	26.6 (79.9)	31.0 (87.8)	35.7 (96.3)	40.5 (104.9)	40.4 (104.7)	39.3 (102.7)	37.8 (100.0)	32.8 (91.0)	26.4 (79.5)	21.5 (70.7)	31.5 (88.7)
Daily mean °C (°F)	12.6 (54.7)	14.5 (58.1)	17.0 (62.6)	20.5 (68.9)	25.1 (77.2)	30.0 (86.0)	32.1 (89.8)	31.3 (88.3)	29.1 (84.4)	23.4 (74.1)	17.2 (63.0)	12.8 (55.0)	22.1 (71.8)
Mean daily minimum °C (°F)	3.7 (38.7)	5.0 (41.0)	7.3 (45.1)	10.2 (50.4)	14.4 (57.9)	19.5 (67.1)	23.8 (74.8)	23.3 (73.9)	20.4 (68.7)	14.0 (57.2)	7.9 (46.2)	4.2 (39.6)	12.8 (55.0)
Record low °C (°F)	−10.0 (14.0)	−7.0 (19.4)	−6.0 (21.2)	−1.2 (29.8)	2.0 (35.6)	4.0 (39.2)	10.0 (50.0)	12.0 (53.6)	7.0 (44.6)	0.0 (32.0)	−4.0 (24.8)	−8.0 (17.6)	−10.0 (14.0)
Average precipitation mm (inches)	22.6 (0.89)	20.1 (0.79)	18.5 (0.73)	6.0 (0.24)	5.0 (0.20)	7.4 (0.29)	70.1 (2.76)	82.6 (3.25)	30.8 (1.21)	23.9 (0.94)	10.0 (0.39)	29.6 (1.17)	326.6 (12.86)
Average precipitation days (≥ 0.1 mm)	3.1	2.1	2.5	1.0	0.4	0.9	6.3	6.4	3.5	2.0	1.6	3.1	32.9
Average relative humidity (%)	64	62	57	50	47	43	52	58	55	56	61	68	56
Mean monthly sunshine hours	237	227	300	326	369	369	333	290	301	296	253	232	3,533
Source 1: Servicio Meteorologico Nacional (humidity 1981–2000)
Source 2: Deutscher Wetterdienst (sun, 1961–1990) (Note: Station ID for Altar is 76113 Use this station ID to locate the sunshine duration)

== See also ==
- Centro Comunitario de Atencion al Migrante y Necesitado (CCAMYN)
