= Sasabe, Arizona =

Unincorporated community in the state of Arizona, United States

- Populated place
- Interactive map of Sasabe, Arizona
- Location within the state of Arizona Sasabe (the United States)
- Coordinates: 31°29′19″N 111°32′31″W
- Country: United States
- State: Arizona
- County: Pima
- Elevation: 3,537 ft (1,078 m)
- Time zone: UTC-7 (MST (no DST))
- Area code: 520
- FIPS code: 04-64520
- GNIS feature ID: 10961

Sasabe (O'odham: Ṣaṣawk) is a small hamlet in the Altar Valley of southern Pima County, Arizona, United States, immediately north of the international border with Mexico. It hosts a minor border crossing, an adobe sales outlet, a public school, a guest ranch, a general store with fuel pumps, a weekend bar, and a post office serving the ZIP Code of 85633. In 2020, the population of the 85633 ZCTA, including Sasabe, was 51.

== History ==
The name Sasabe is derived from the Native American language of the Tohono O'odham (formerly Papago) meaning "head valley".

The ranch's origins trace back to the era of Spanish and Jesuit missionary activity that shaped much of southern Arizona. The article explains that Jesuit missionaries, including Father Eusebio Kino, traveled through the region during the early mission period while establishing religious outposts across the desert borderlands. Father Kino visited the area that would later become Rancho de la Osa, and his presence forms an important part of the ranch's early history. His travels connected the region to a wider network of missions throughout the Pimería Alta. This connection is one of the foundational elements of the ranch's historical identity. The land has roots stretching back to early mission activity, long before the formation of modern communities like Sasabe. This missionary influence is part of what gives the ranch, and the surrounding area, a unique cultural heritage tied to the early Spanish religious presence in southern Arizona.

The post office was established at Sasabe in 1905.

Sasabe is best known for its historic Rancho de la Osa guest ranch, formerly the headquarters of a three million acre (12,000 km^{2}) Spanish land grant. Some ranch buildings reportedly date to the late 17th century. The guest ranch opened in 1921. Guests have included Presidents Franklin Roosevelt and Lyndon Johnson.

On average, 165 cars, trucks, or pedestrians per day passed through the Sasabe Port of Entry in 2011. Sasabe, Arizona is smaller than its sister community, El Sásabe, Sonora, which is known for its burnt-adobe brickyards.

In the 2018–2019 school year, the local school served 28 children in grades K-8.

== Geography ==
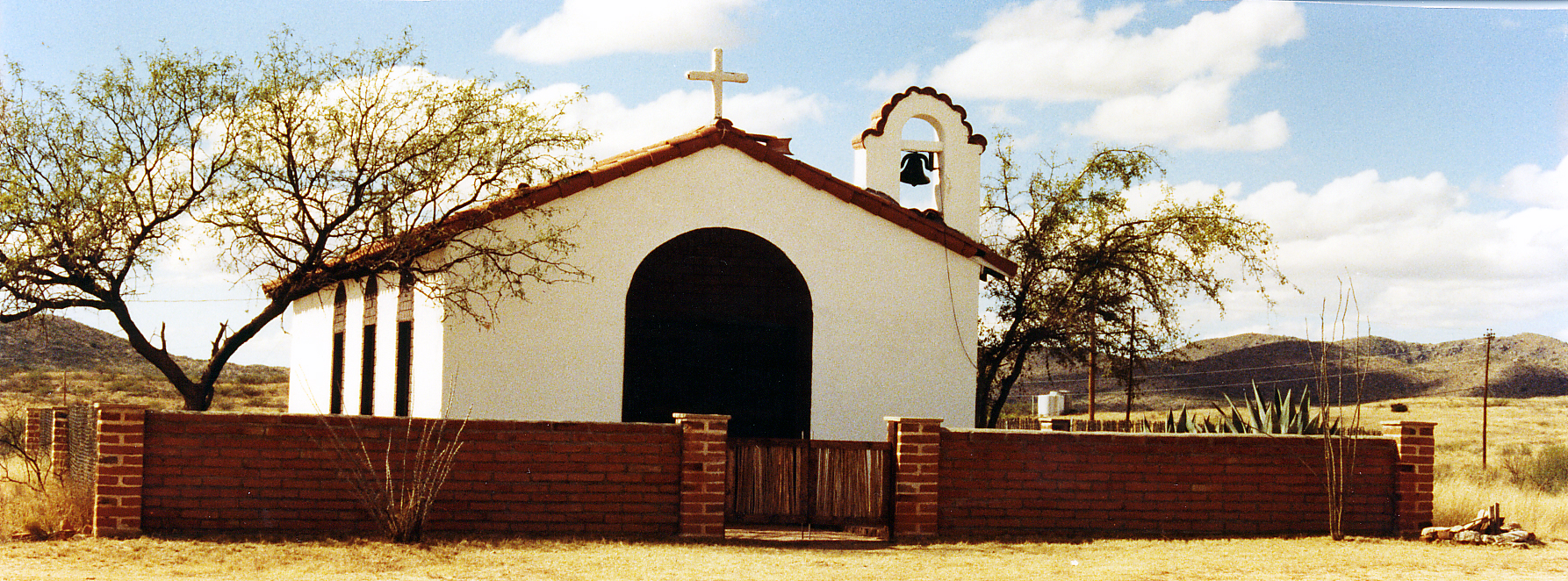
Church in Sasabe

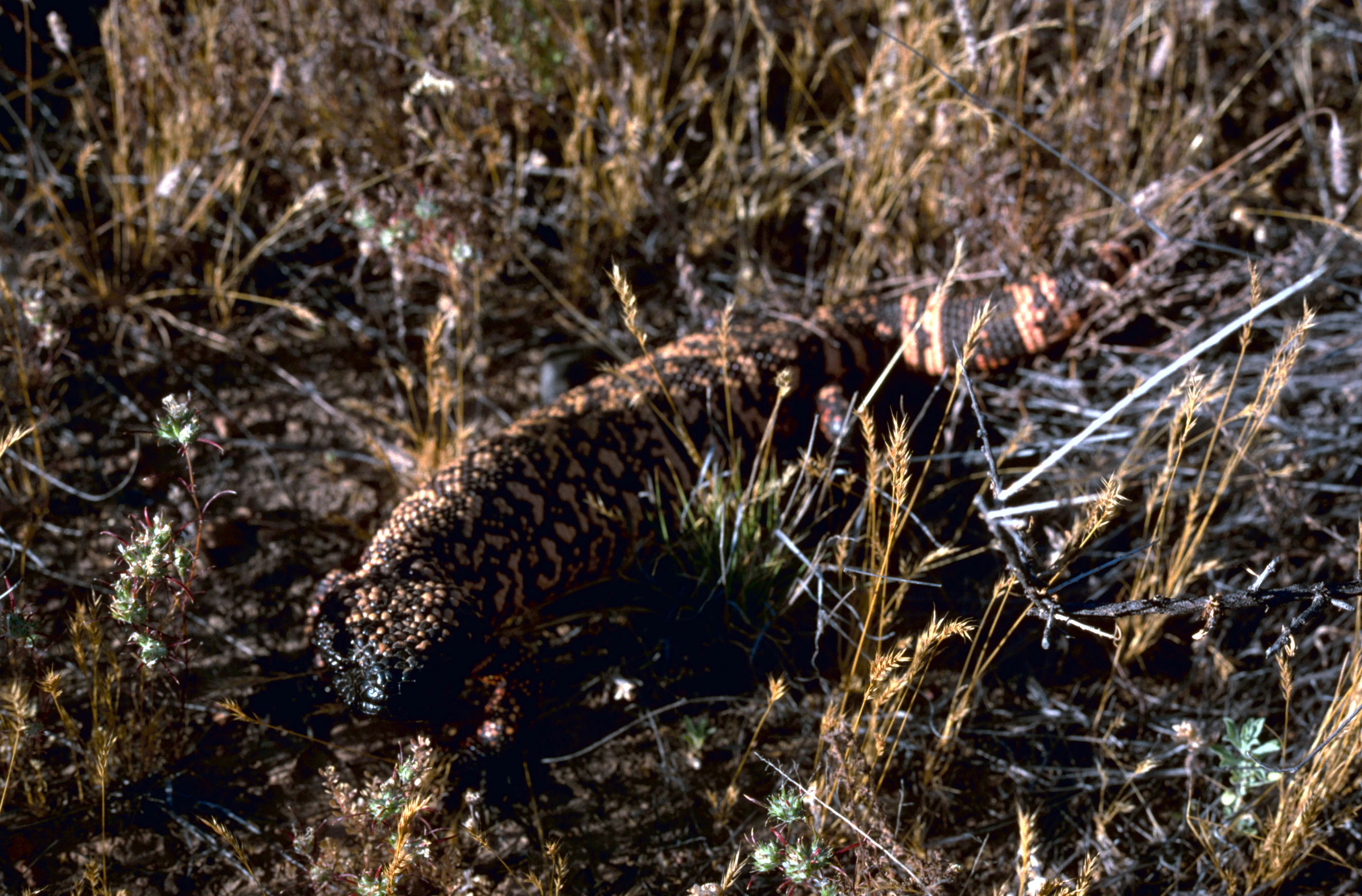
Gila Monster, Buenos Aires National Wildlife Refuge

Sasabe is seated on an arid, gently rolling sand-plain relieved only by scatter shrub trees and grass hummocks. Much of the area north and east of Sasabe is within the Buenos Aires National Wildlife Refuge. In 2006, 3,500 acres (14 km^{2}) of the refuge that border Mexico east of Sasabe were closed to public entry due to problems with smugglers and unauthorized border crossings.

=== Climate ===
Sasabe has a semi-arid climate (Köppen: BSh) with mild winters and very hot summers.

Climate data for Sasabe, Arizona, 1991–2020 normals, extremes 1959–present
| Month | Jan | Feb | Mar | Apr | May | Jun | Jul | Aug | Sep | Oct | Nov | Dec | Year |
|---|---|---|---|---|---|---|---|---|---|---|---|---|---|
| Record high °F (°C) | 85 (29) | 91 (33) | 92 (33) | 100 (38) | 104 (40) | 113 (45) | 111 (44) | 110 (43) | 107 (42) | 104 (40) | 93 (34) | 87 (31) | 113 (45) |
| Mean maximum °F (°C) | 77.7 (25.4) | 79.5 (26.4) | 84.6 (29.2) | 91.1 (32.8) | 97.5 (36.4) | 105.2 (40.7) | 105.1 (40.6) | 102.0 (38.9) | 98.8 (37.1) | 94.4 (34.7) | 85.2 (29.6) | 78.3 (25.7) | 106.8 (41.6) |
| Mean daily maximum °F (°C) | 65.9 (18.8) | 67.1 (19.5) | 72.7 (22.6) | 79.7 (26.5) | 87.8 (31.0) | 97.0 (36.1) | 96.4 (35.8) | 94.0 (34.4) | 91.5 (33.1) | 84.0 (28.9) | 74.2 (23.4) | 65.2 (18.4) | 81.3 (27.4) |
| Daily mean °F (°C) | 50.6 (10.3) | 51.9 (11.1) | 56.6 (13.7) | 62.0 (16.7) | 69.2 (20.7) | 78.7 (25.9) | 81.5 (27.5) | 79.9 (26.6) | 76.1 (24.5) | 67.3 (19.6) | 57.8 (14.3) | 50.0 (10.0) | 65.1 (18.4) |
| Mean daily minimum °F (°C) | 35.4 (1.9) | 36.8 (2.7) | 40.6 (4.8) | 44.3 (6.8) | 50.6 (10.3) | 60.4 (15.8) | 66.7 (19.3) | 65.7 (18.7) | 60.8 (16.0) | 50.6 (10.3) | 41.3 (5.2) | 34.7 (1.5) | 49.0 (9.4) |
| Mean minimum °F (°C) | 25.6 (−3.6) | 26.9 (−2.8) | 30.9 (−0.6) | 34.4 (1.3) | 40.8 (4.9) | 49.6 (9.8) | 59.9 (15.5) | 60.3 (15.7) | 51.9 (11.1) | 39.6 (4.2) | 30.0 (−1.1) | 24.9 (−3.9) | 22.5 (−5.3) |
| Record low °F (°C) | 14 (−10) | 12 (−11) | 13 (−11) | 25 (−4) | 32 (0) | 39 (4) | 51 (11) | 49 (9) | 40 (4) | 27 (−3) | 22 (−6) | 14 (−10) | 12 (−11) |
| Average precipitation inches (mm) | 0.91 (23) | 1.16 (29) | 0.96 (24) | 0.46 (12) | 0.15 (3.8) | 0.35 (8.9) | 2.77 (70) | 3.20 (81) | 1.62 (41) | 0.50 (13) | 0.72 (18) | 1.44 (37) | 14.24 (362) |
| Average snowfall inches (cm) | 0.0 (0.0) | 0.0 (0.0) | 0.6 (1.5) | 0.0 (0.0) | 0.0 (0.0) | 0.0 (0.0) | 0.0 (0.0) | 0.0 (0.0) | 0.0 (0.0) | 0.0 (0.0) | 0.0 (0.0) | 0.0 (0.0) | 0.6 (1.5) |
| Average precipitation days (≥ 0.01 inch) | 2.5 | 2.9 | 2.4 | 1.2 | 0.5 | 1.1 | 7.7 | 8.5 | 4.4 | 1.6 | 1.5 | 2.9 | 37.2 |
| Average snowy days (≥ 0.1 inch) | 0.0 | 0.0 | 0.1 | 0.0 | 0.0 | 0.0 | 0.0 | 0.0 | 0.0 | 0.0 | 0.0 | 0.0 | 0.1 |
Source: NOAA

== See also ==
- Baboquivari Peak
- Altar Valley
- 2010 Saric shootout
- 2015 Amado checkpoint protest
