= Tubutama Municipality =

Coordinates: 30.8541°N 111.4222°W

Tubutama
- Municipality
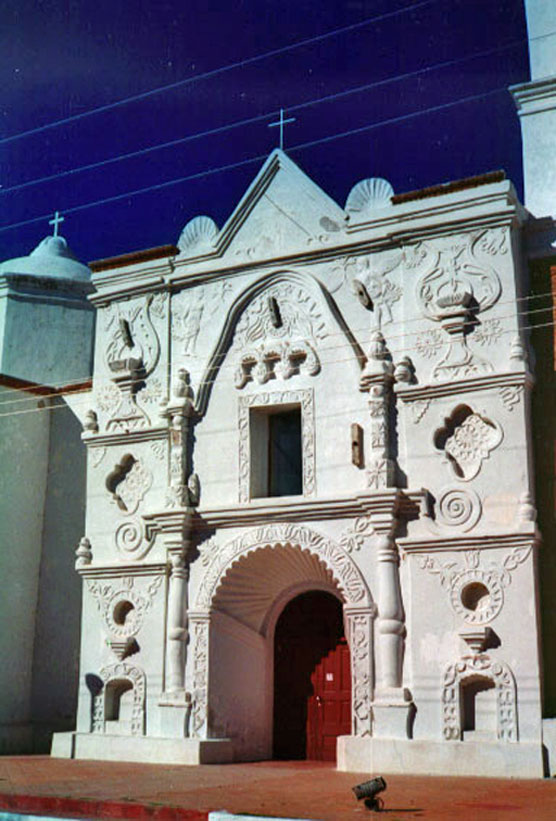
- Mission of Saints Peter and Paul in Tubutama

- Coat of arms

- Location of the municipality in Sonora
- Country: Mexico
- State: Sonora
- Seat: Tubutama
- Time zone: UTC–07:00 (Zona Pacífico)

Tubutama is a municipality in the state of Sonora in north-western Mexico. The municipal seat is at Tubutama.
