= Trincheras Municipality =

Coordinates: 30.3889°N 111.5131°W

Trincheras
- Municipality
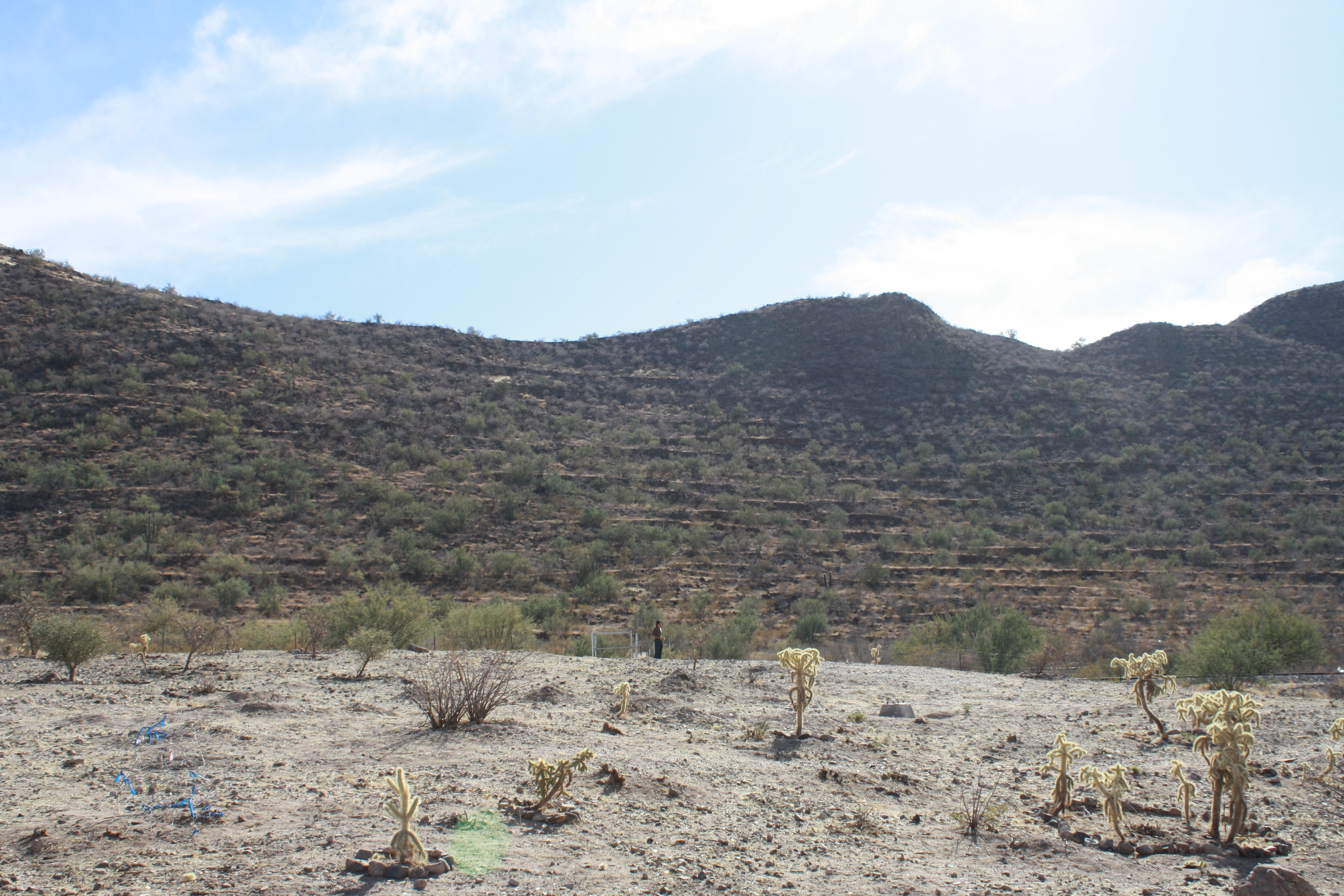
- Cerro de Trincheras

- Location of the municipality in Sonora
- Country: Mexico
- State: Sonora
- Seat: Trincheras
- Time zone: UTC–07:00 (Zona Pacífico)

Trincheras is a municipality in the state of Sonora in north-western Mexico. The municipal seat is at Trincheras.
