= Tubutama =

- Town and Municipality
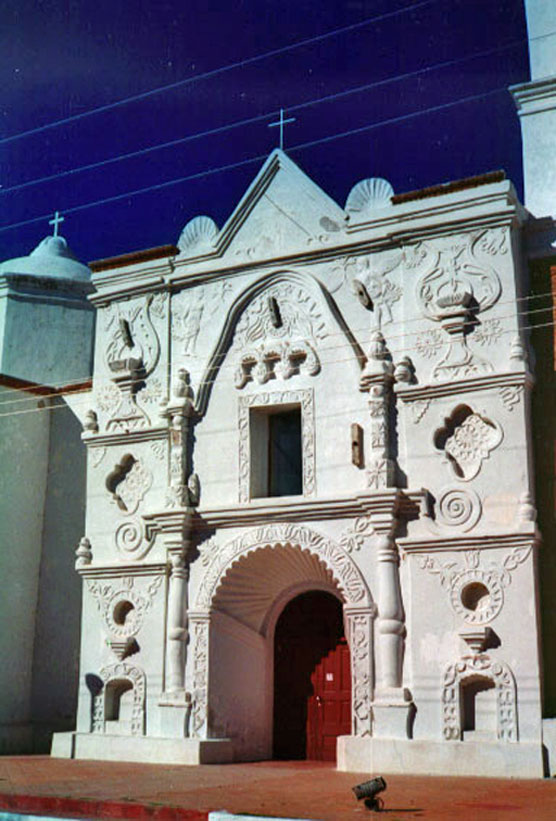
- Mission San Pedro y San Pablo de Tubutama

- Location within Sonora Location within Mexico
- Coordinates: 30°53′5″N 111°27′50″W
- Country: Mexico
- State: Sonora
- Municipality: Tubutama
- Founded: late C.17th

Government
  - Mayor: Elmer Montoya Gaxiola
- Time zone: UTC–07:00 (Zona Pacífico)

Tubutama is a town in the north-west of the Mexican state of Sonora. It serves as the seat for the surrounding municipality of the same name.

The municipal area is 1,351.60 km^{2} (521.86 sq mi), and the population was 1,798 in 2005. The main economic activities are cattle raising (11,000 head in 2005) and subsistence farming.

Eusebio Kino, SJ, founded Mission San Pedro y San Pablo del Tubutama in 1691. Tubutama was the headquarters of religious administration for the entire Pimería Alta during much of the Jesuit and Franciscan period of Spanish colonial rule.

== See also ==
- Mission San Pedro y San Pablo del Tubutama
