= Trincheras =

- Town and Municipality
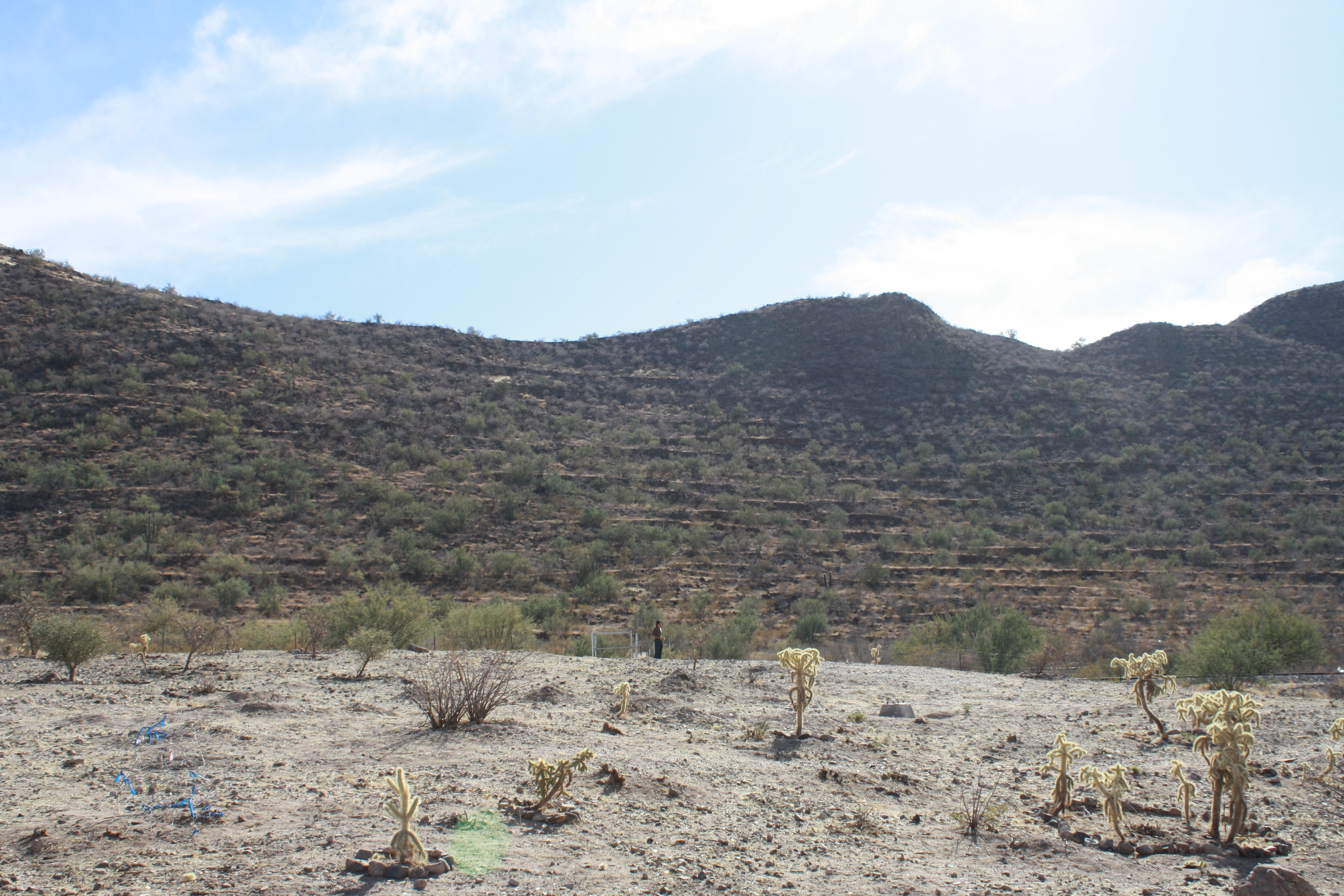
- Cerro de Trincheras

- Location in Mexico
- Coordinates: 30°24′0″N 111°32′0″W
- Country: Mexico
- State: Sonora
- Municipality: Trincheras
- Founded: 1775

Government
  - Mayor: Nely Duarte
- Time zone: UTC–07:00 (Zona Pacífico)

Trincheras is a town in Trincheras Municipality, in the north-west of the Mexican state of Sonora. It was founded in 1775 by Bernardo de Urrea. The municipal area is 3,764.26 km^{2}, and the population in 2000 was 1,788.

== Economy ==
The main economic activities are cattle raising (21,000 head in 2000) and subsistence farming.

== Indigenous architecture ==
Trincheras was named for El Cerro de Trincheras, a nearby archaeological site. This site is also the namesake of a distinctive type of archaeological site found in the desert basins of the southwest United States and northwest Mexico. Remains of hillside terraces and walls reminded early explorers of trincheras, the Spanish term for entrenchments or fortifications.
