= Átil Municipality =

Átil
- Municipality
- Coat of arms

- Location of the municipality in Sonora
- Coordinates: 30°50′37″N 111°35′02″W
- Country: Mexico
- State: Sonora
- Municipal seat: Átil, Sonora
- Time zone: UTC–07:00 (Zona Pacífico)
- Website: atil.gob.mx

Átil is a municipality in the north-western Mexican state of Sonora. As of 2020, the municipality had a total population of 626 inhabitants. The municipal seat lies at Átil, Sonora.
