= Llano del Beal =

Locality in Cartagena, Spain

Coordinates: 37°37′28″N 0°50′09″W

- Singular population entity and pedanía

- Flag Coat of arms
- Interactive map of Llano del Beal
- Country: Spain
- Autonomous community: Murcia
- Comarca: Campo de Cartagena
- Judicial district: Cartagena
- Municipality: Cartagena

Government
  - Mayor: Noelia Arroyo (PP)

Population (2021)
  - Total: 1,337
- Postal code: 30381
- Website: www.cartagena.es

Llano del Beal (also known as El Llano del Beal or El Llano) is a town in the municipality of Cartagena in the autonomous community of the Region of Murcia in Spain.

== Physical geography ==
=== Location ===
Located to the east of the municipality of Cartagena, a city 14 kilometers away.

Part of the Sierra Minera de Cartagena-La Unión extends through this town.

Through El Llano del Beal and San Ginés de la Jara passes the rambla of El Beal, which flows north of the Arenal Beach in Los Nietos near the salt marsh of Lo Poyo, which carries spills of heavy metals from the old mining activity.

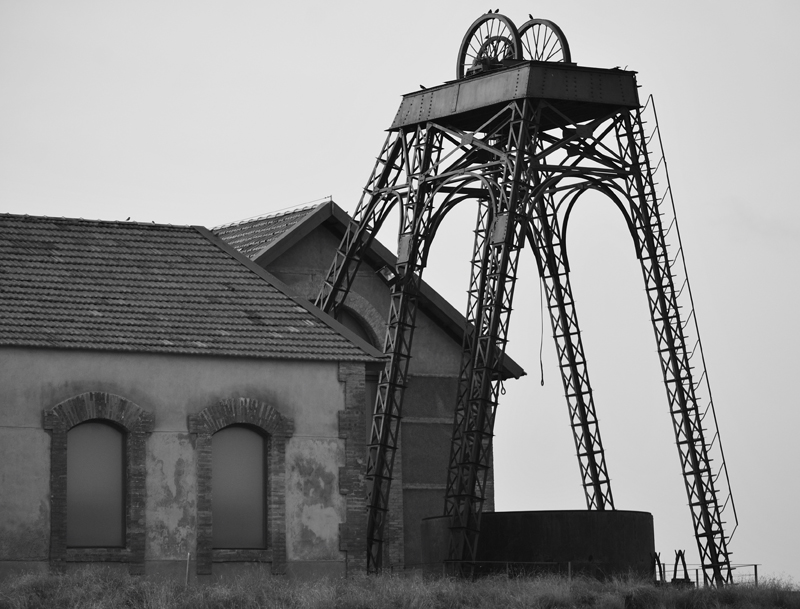
Castillete of a mine.

== History ==
The village was born in the last years of the 19th century to house workers who worked in the mines of galena and other metals.

At the foot of the mining mountain range, it is located on a plain called El Llano.

Its first inhabitants were mostly mine workers. They came from the nearby countryside and also from the province of Almería.

Historically the basis of its economic activity was mining, which caused a strong labor conflict mainly due to the harsh working conditions, such as the strike of 1898 and the events of Descargador in 1916.

As a witness of its working class past, the Casa del Pueblo was inaugurated in 1916 by the Sociedad Nueva España, which later became part of the UGT union. At the end of the civil war and the establishment of Franco's dictatorship, the building was requisitioned, its name was changed to Hogar del Productor and after the death of the dictator, it was returned to the union.

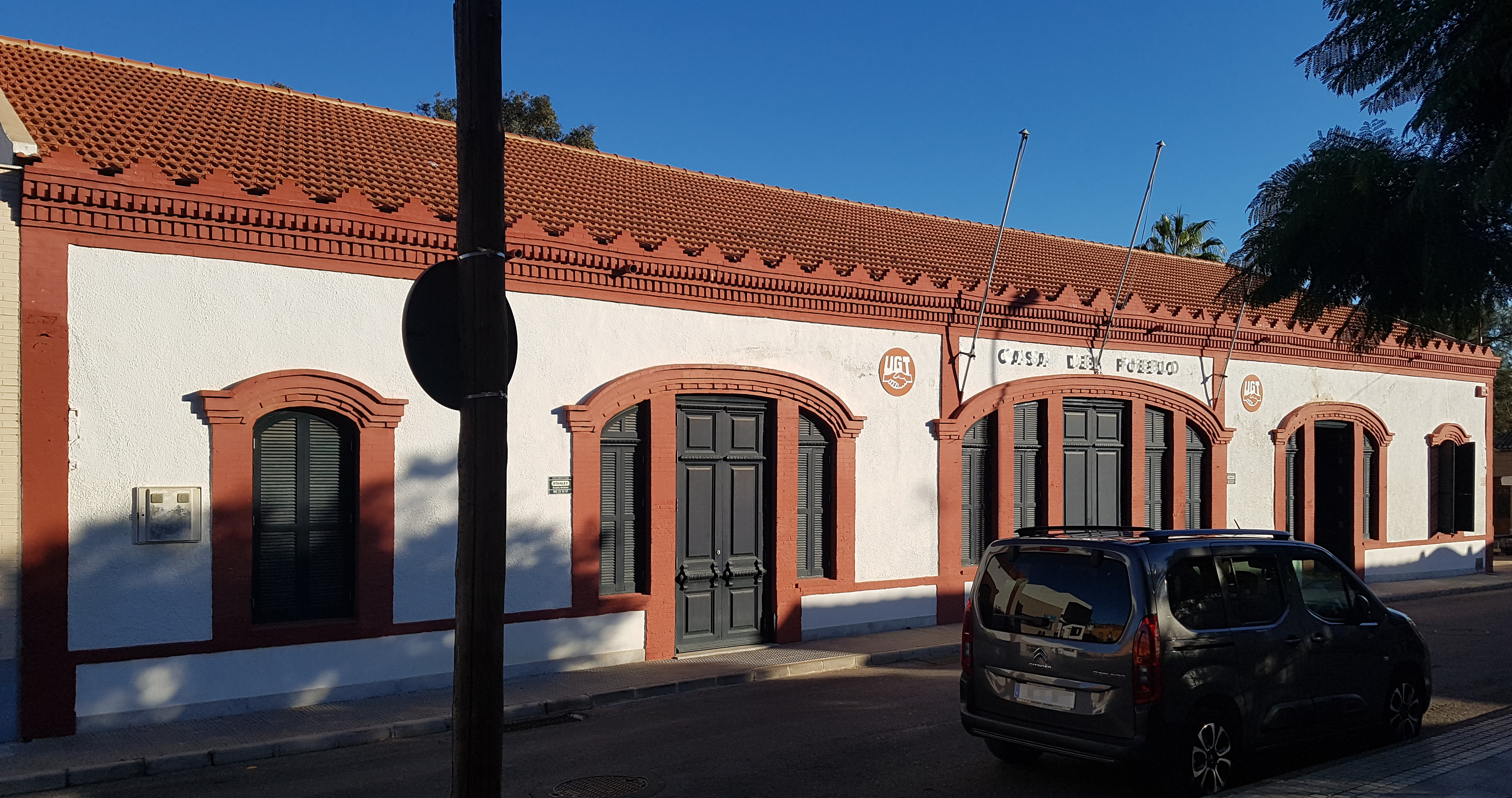
Casa del Pueblo in El Llano del Beal.

There is also a modernist style building, the Casino, which shows the past economic splendor.

Since 1927 the mining activity suffered a strong crisis that produced a massive exodus of the population caused by the decline of mining activity and when in 1957 began the open pit mining of the Sociedad Minera y Metalúrgica de Peñarroya with its aggressive activity caused the reaction of the inhabitants by endangering their homes. From 1988 onwards, the company Portmán Golf S.A. became the owner, and the confrontations became so intense that the activity was put to an end. The company offered the construction of a new village but the neighbors stood guard night and day in shifts so that the mining activity did not approach the village and for this they built a hut that, remodeled, remains as a reminder of their struggle.

Years after the end of the mining activity, heavy metal contamination was produced, affecting the health of their neighbors.

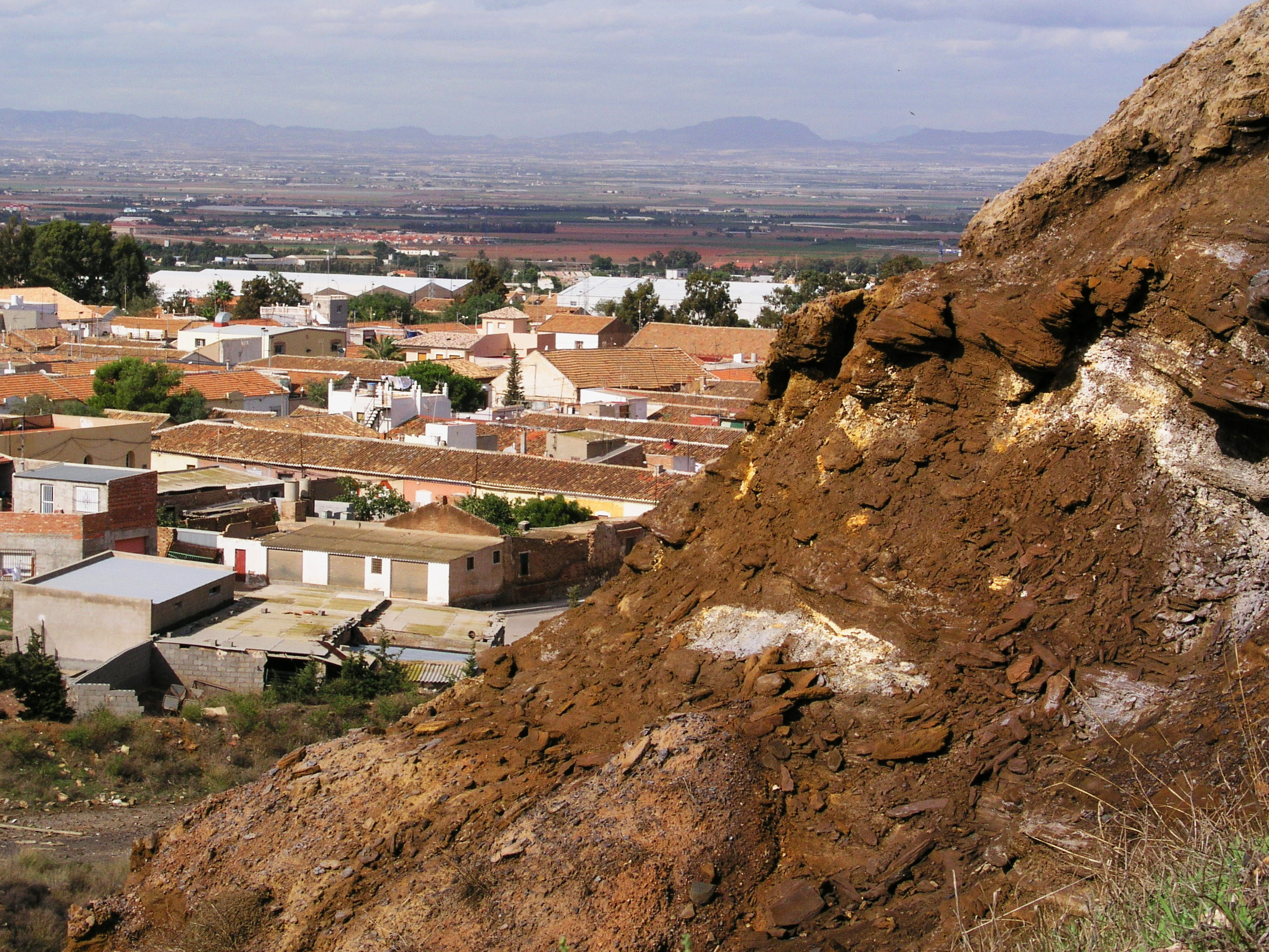
The Yenny tailings pond that threatens El Llano del Beal.

== Human geography ==
=== Territorial organization ===
The municipal district of Cartagena is divided into collective entities of population there called diputaciones. Llano del Beal belongs to the deputation of El Beal and is a singular population entity or pedanía of the municipality.

=== Demographics ===
The total population is 1,337 inhabitants in 2021.

The evolution of the population maintains a regressive tendency.

=== Economy ===
Although the location has a mining origin, at present this sector is inactive and the economy is based on the services of the tourist sector, construction and industry, with agriculture being insignificant.

=== Facilities and services ===
- OMITA (Municipal Office of information and administrative procedures of the City Council of Cartagena).
- Social center.
- Public school San Ginés de la Jara (building also in El Estrecho de San Ginés).
- Medical office
- Pharmacy
- Casa del pueblo.
- Deportiva Minera soccer club (shared with El Estrecho de San Ginés and El Beal) based in the Angel Celdran Stadium.
- Cemetery, located near the monastery of San Ginés de la Jara.

=== Transport and communications ===
==== Roads ====
The town is connected by the RM-F43 with the nearby town of El Estrecho de San Ginés (from which it is 600 meters away and from which it is separated by the railway), the Mar Menor and with the Rincón de San Ginés; by the same road in the opposite direction it communicates with La Unión and Cartagena; and by another road, the RM-F42, it passes through El Beal and connects with the RM-12 highway in the vicinity of El Algar.

==== Railroad ====
Commuter rail of the Cartagena-Los Nietos Line operated by Renfe with a station.

==== Bus ====
The road passenger service of the municipality is included within the Movibus brand, an interurban public transport system of the Region of Murcia (Spain), which includes bus services owned by the autonomous region. The lines of the concession MUR-004 "Metropolitana Cartagena-Mar Menor" are operated by ALSA (TUCARSA).

Line	Route
43	Cartagena - Cabo de Palos - La Manga del Mar Menor

== Festivities ==
The popular festivities are from August 31 to September 9.

== Influence ==
There is a 2001 documentary film directed by Miguel Martí and titled Portmán, a la sombra de Roberto (Portmán, in the shadow of Roberto), which recalls in interviews and images the neighbors' struggle for the survival of the town against the Portmán Golf company that extracted ore a few meters from the town.

== Hiking routes ==
It passes by the proximities of the population the footpath of small route PR MU 3.

== See also ==
- El Estrecho de San Ginés
- Portmán
