= El Estrecho de San Ginés =

Locality in Cartagena, Spain

- Singular population entity and pedanía

- Flag Coat of arms
- Interactive map of El Estrecho de San Ginés
- Country: Spain
- Autonomous community: Region of Murcia
- Province: Murcia
- Comarca: Campo de Cartagena
- Judicial district: Cartagena
- Municipality: Cartagena

Government
  - Mayor: Noelia Arroyo (PP)

Population (INE, 2021)
  - Total: 694
- Postal code: 30381
- Website: www.cartagena.es

El Estrecho de San Ginés (also known as El Estrecho) is a town in the municipality of Cartagena, Region of Murcia, Spain.

== Physical geography ==
=== Location ===
Located to the east of the municipality of Cartagena, a city from which it is 15 kilometers away.

Part of the Sierra Minera de Cartagena-La Unión extends through this town.

Located on the southern slope of Mount Miral (also known as the hill or cabezo de San Ginés) where an important hermitage was located due to its proximity to the Monastery of San Ginés de la Jara.

From El Estrecho de San Ginés, one kilometer away, along the RM-F43 road that goes towards the Mar Menor and Rincón de San Ginés, is the Cueva Victoria which is a paleontological site of karstic origin.

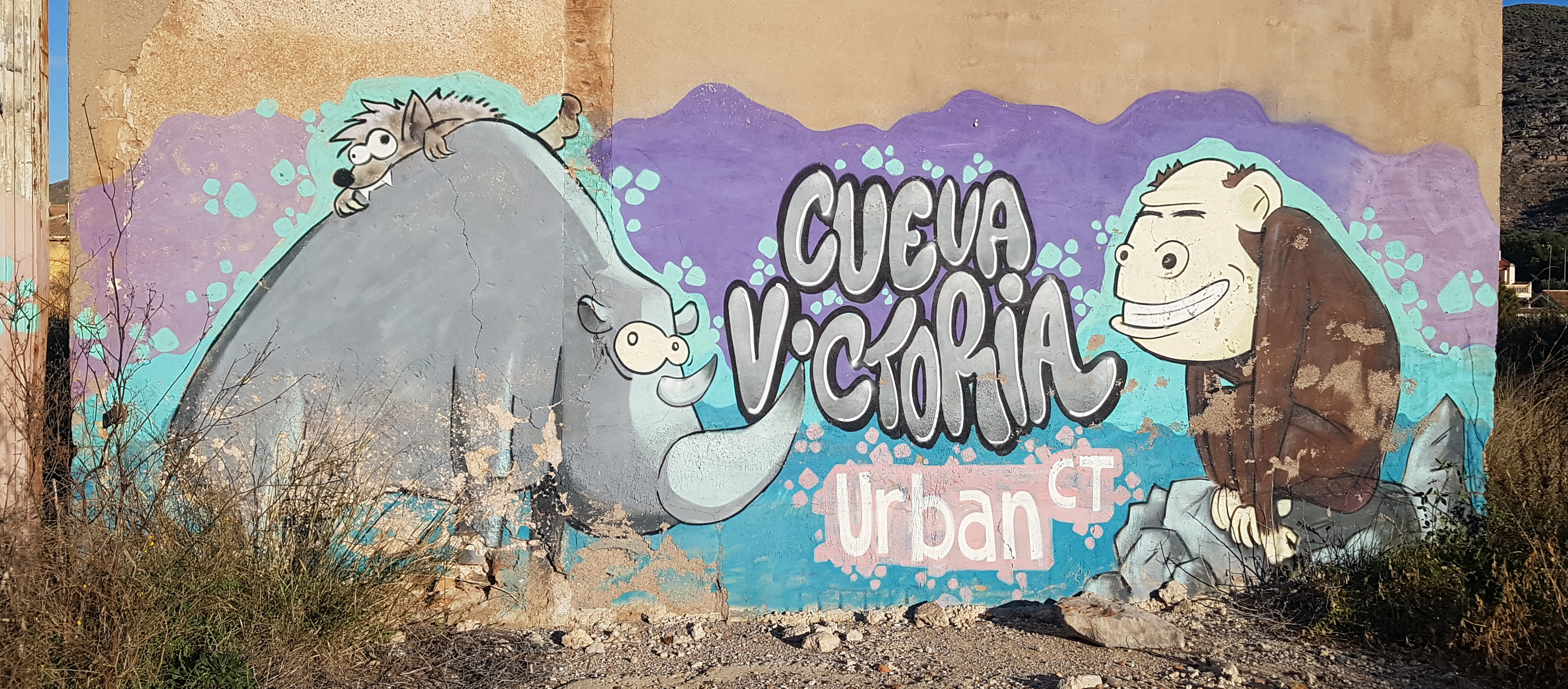
Pleistocene Route. Mural in El Estrecho de San Ginés allegorical to the nearby Cueva Victoria.

From El Estrecho starts the Ponce ravine, which flows into Los Nietos, between the Los Nietos train station and the Lo Poyo salt marsh.

== Human geography ==
=== Territorial organization ===
The municipal district of Cartagena is divided into collective entities of population there called diputaciones. El Estrecho de San Ginés belongs to the deputation of El Beal and is a singular population entity or pedanía of the municipality.

=== Demographics ===
The total population is 694 inhabitants in 2021.

=== Economy ===
It was the most important town in the area until 1880 when it became Llano del Beal. Testimony of its former importance is that the parish was located here.

The basis of its economic activity was mining as was the neighboring town of Llano del Beal with which it shares a common history. Years after the end of the mining activity, heavy metal contamination was produced, affecting the health of their neighbors.

Currently its economy is based on the service sector in nearby towns.

=== Facilities and services ===
- San Ginés de la Jara public school (building also in Llano del Beal).
- Space of Leisure of El Estrecho de San Ginés.
- Club of soccer Deportiva Minera, shared with Llano del Beal and El Beal with headquarters in the Stadium Ángel Celdran.
- Cemetery, located near the monastery of San Ginés de la Jara.

=== Transport and communications ===
==== Roads ====
The town is connected by the RM-F43 with the nearby town of Llano del Beal (from which it is 600 meters away and from which it is separated by the railway), La Unión and Cartagena; by the same road, in the opposite direction, it communicates with the Mar Menor and with the Rincón de San Ginés.

==== Railroad ====
Commuter rail of the Cartagena-Los Nietos Line operated by Renfe with a halt.

==== Bus ====
The road passenger service of the municipality is included within the Movibus brand, an intercity public transport system of the Region of Murcia (Spain), which includes bus services owned by the autonomous region. The lines of the concession MUR-004 "Metropolitana Cartagena-Mar Menor" are operated by ALSA (TUCARSA).

Line	Route
43	Cartagena - Cabo de Palos - La Manga del Mar Menor

== Festivities ==
The local festivities are on August 25 in honor of its patron Saint Nicholas of Bari.

== See also ==
- Llano del Beal
