= Districts of Cartagena, Spain =

Cartagena municipality with a demarcation of its districts or diputaciones.

The Spanish municipality of Cartagena has 24 districts, known as diputaciones (councils). The original 17 districts established at the beginning of the 18th century were maintained throughout that century, and were the equivalent of the pedanías (municipal districts) in other areas. This administrative structure was put in place in response to population increase in that era, and because the municipality was becoming less tractable.

There are committees with performing power and a few competences that arise from the municipality government and their name is juntas vecinales. They are in some districts and localities. Some administrative centres are available for the inhabitants of most districts and their name is omitas. Citizens can perform some administration processes such as such as registration of residency processes, information about and processes for works and installations, and so force there.

== Cartagena Casco ==
=== Population ===
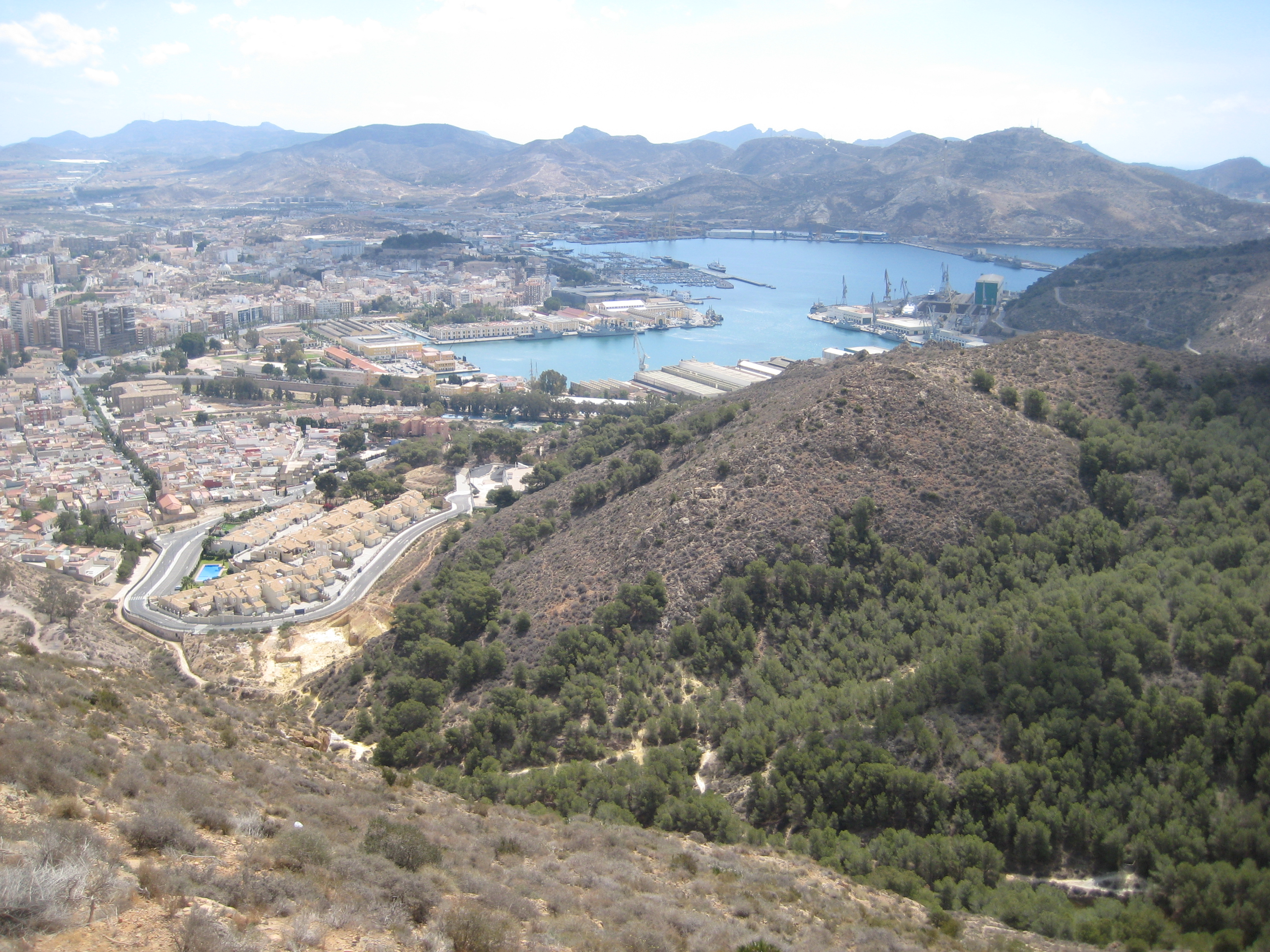
Bay of Cartagena.

Cartagena Casco is the municipality's capital, historically its main locality, and its most populated area. In 2017, it had a population of 57,570.

Cartagena Casco encompasses several localities, with a population distribution as follows in 2018: Cartagena (43,266); Ensanche-Almarjal (6,028); Barriada Virgen de La Caridad (2,923); and San Ginés (4,949).

=== History ===
Cartagena Casco was first settled by the Iberians.

The area later gained in significance, with the arrival of the Carthaginians in 227 BC. Their city, Qart Hadasht, assumed the role of capital and had a number of high status buildings and structures.

Between 211 and 209 BC, during the Second Punic War, a series of battles took place in Qart Hadasht. In 209 BC, Roman armies led by Scipio Africanus conquered the city, which was known from that time as Carthago Nova and Carthago Spartaria. Scipio made the city the centre of diplomatic relations between the Roman authorities and the Iberians and Celtiberians.

Carthago Nova was awarded the status of Roman colonia in the 1st century BC. During this period the city became completely Romanized, attaining the peak of its wealth and importance between the 1st century BC and the 2nd century AD. Both the Roman Theatre of Cartagena and its amphitheatre were built in the final years of the first century BC.

During the decline of the Western Roman Empire and resulting Migration Period in Roman Hispania, Carthago Nova attracted the attention of the Vandals. The Vandals arrived in the city in 425 on their way to Africa and attacked, but did not cause serious damage. Shortly afterwards, the Roman emperor Majorian gathered a large fleet to evict them.

Following the collapse of the Roman Empire, during the era of Visigothic control over almost all of the Iberian Peninsula, there was a period of political uncertainty in Carthago Nova. This came to an end when the Byzantine emperor Justinian I sent two armies to Hispania, the first in 552 AD and the second a year later.

Justinian I secured a coastal strip the exact extent of which is unknown, although it may have been bounded in the west by the Strait of Gibraltar and in the east by Cap de la Nau (Valencia). The conquered territory also encompassed the Balearic Islands. This area became a province of the Byzantine Empire, of which Cartagena was the capital due to its strategic location and its port.

In 612 AD, the Visigothic king carried out a successful offensive against the territories still belonging to Byzantium. He did not succeed in conquering Carthago Spartaria, which would fall to his successor, Suintila, in 621–624. Attempts to win back the town were unsuccessful.

From the 8th century, the Visigothic kingdom was debilitated, impoverished and in a state of civil war. North African invaders, whose political and religious cohesion gave them an advantage over the disunited Visigoths, moved in.

In 711 the head of the army in Africa sent Musa ibn Nusayr to fight the Visigoth king, Roderic. With Roderic defeated, there was no serious obstacle to Muslim rule. The caliph's sovereignty over the new province of the Islamic empire was proclaimed in 713, without resistance from Cartagena.

From the 8th to the 11th centuries, Cartagena could not be considered a town. At the time of the Islamic invasion, it had a population of only a few hundred of people, inhabiting the ruins near the port.

In the 12th century, the political and economic rise of Murcia and decline of Almería boosted Cartagena's relevance. The town's importance peaked at the beginning of the 13th century.

Between 1238 and 1243, the Muslim kingdom of Murcia came under increasing pressure from the powerful kingdoms of Castile, Aragon and Granada. There was also considerable internal instability. King Ibn Hud decided to make Castile a vassal state.

In April 1243 the Treaty of Alcaraz, recognizing the sovereignty of Castile, was signed. The treaty covered the entire kingdom, and any town refusing to comply, such as Cartagena, was considered to be rebelling. The Castilian prince accordingly determined to conquer Cartagena, but initially left the town in peace because time and resources were short and he had first to subdue Orihuela and other localities.

In 1245, the Castilian army encircled Cartagena with the help of a fleet in the Cantabrian Sea. Cartagena surrendered unconditionally the same year. A Castilian garrison was established shortly afterwards, and the inhabitants of Cartagena were expelled.

Several decades later, king Alfonso X of Castile decided to use the port of Cartagena as a base, both for increasing Castile's trade with the West Mediterranean and for his project of expanding the kingdom in North Africa.

In the early modern period, Cartagena became increasingly prominent in the documentary record.

After a troubled and uncertain period in which Cartagena's population declined, the town experienced a recovery, although its population never exceeded 1,500 during the 15th century. The number of inhabitants increased further during the 16th century, during which period Cartagena was protected by a wall and castle. Both structures were in a state of precarious repair.

Later, the military defences of the port and the ancient coastal lagoon, Mandarache, were strengthened. Defensive works were undertaken in the port during the 1750s, with the addition of several batteries and forts. In 1765, there was a project to enclose the town that also envisaged the building of castles on the surrounding hills. Construction of Cartagena's arsenal was completed in 1782.

The prosperity of mining activities in La Unión in Murcia led to the construction of lavish villas by the mine owners and the development of housing in what was regarded as Cartagena's town centre. New artistic movements such Art Nouveau were evident in some of the town's new architecture.

This architectural sophistication extended beyond private housing, and also characterized public buildings such as the Palacio Consistorial, the Cartagena's railway station, and the Basilica of La Caridad. Landmark buildings the Casa Pedreño, Casa Aguirre and Casa Cervantes were built at the end of the 19th century, and the Casa Dorda and Casa Zapata were built in the first decade of the 20th century.

== San Antonio Abad ==
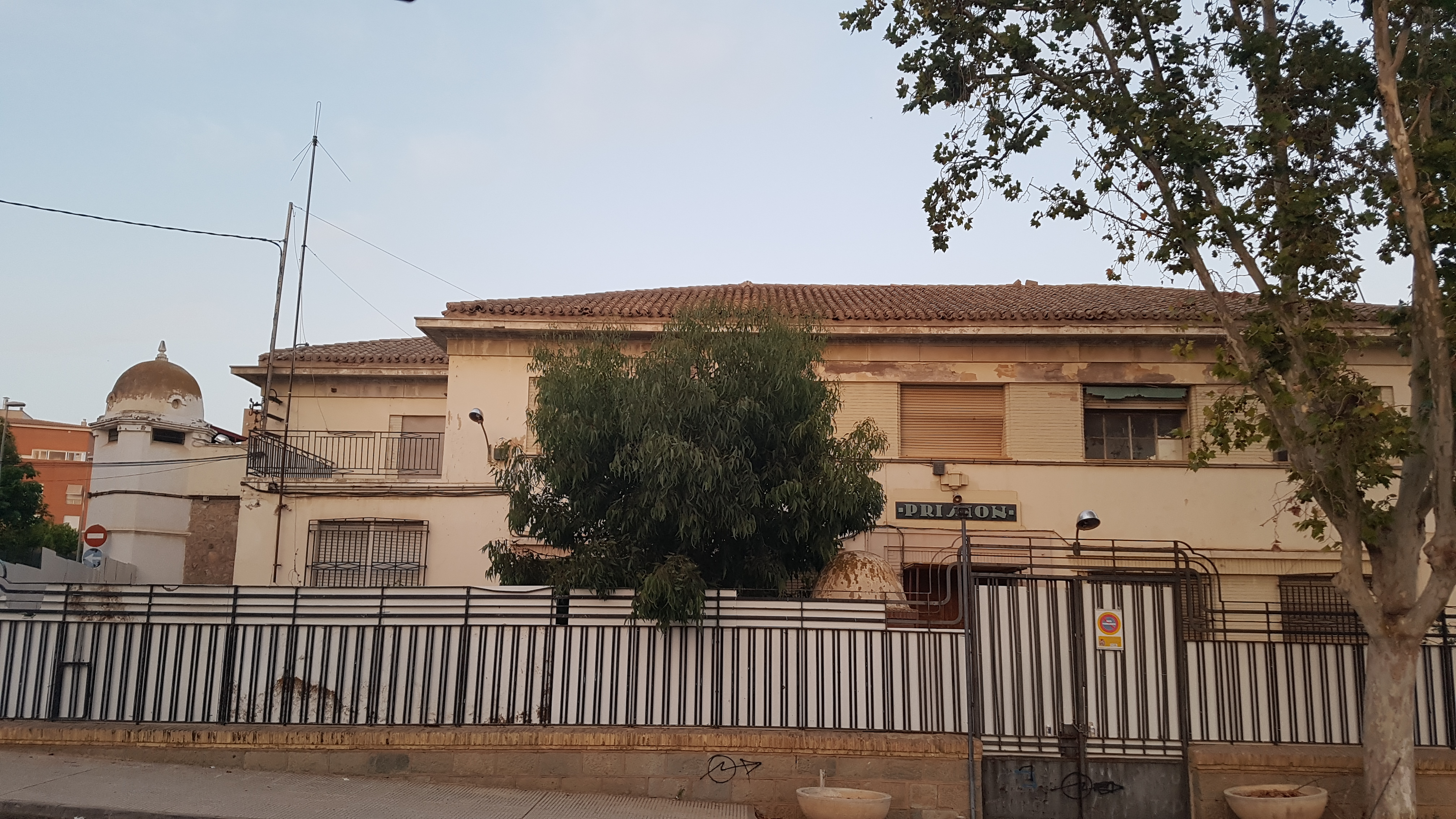
Ancient prison of San Antón neighbourhood built in the first half of 20th century.

San Antonio Abad wraps around the northern and eastern boundaries of Cartagena Casco and, with a population of 44,661, is the municipality's second most populated district.

In 2018, the population distribution was as follows in the district's localities: San Antonio Abad (24,115); Barrio de Peral (15,570); Urbanización Mediterráneo (5,685); Barrio de la Concepción (4,952); Urbanización Nueva Cartagena (3,461); Urbanización Media Sala (1,636); and Barriada de Villalba (949).

The first documented references to the district date back to 1530.

In the 18th century, military construction work in Cartagena was a significant source of employment, with the building of the arsenal and other defensive structures. This led to a population increase in the city and municipality. Waves of immigrants settled in neighbourhoods outside the walled city of Cartagena itself, among them La Concepción and San Antón in the district of San Antonio Abad. San Antón had been settled since the 17th century because of its cultivated agricultural land. In contrast, La Concepción was established as a result of this population influx triggered by military construction activity in the port.

During the Peninsular War (1808–1814) a French army entered Murcia from Andalusia with the aim of defeating the Spanish army in the region and conquering Cartagena. Cartagena's authorities reacted by destroying buildings to prevent the French army from using them as cover. The neighbourhood of La Concepción was almost completely razed, with 488 buildings demolished.

At the end of the 19th century and beginning of the 20th, new housing was built to accommodate new inhabitants. The neighbourhoods of La Concepción and San Antón were expanded, and the new neighbourhood of Los Molinos sprang up.

== El Plan ==
El Plan, with a population of 36,018, is the third most populated district in the municipality of Cartagena .

The population is distributed across the following localities: Los Dolores (7,672); El Plan (7,497); Polígono de Santa Ana (7,162); Los Barreros (6,927); La Baña (5,628); Los Gatos (5,581); Barriada Hispanoamérica (3,872); Barriada Cuatro Santos (2,598); Castillitos (1,482); and La Guía (115).

The name El Plan comes from the Catalan pla (plain).

The first documented reference to this district dates back to 1683.

== Rincón de San Ginés ==
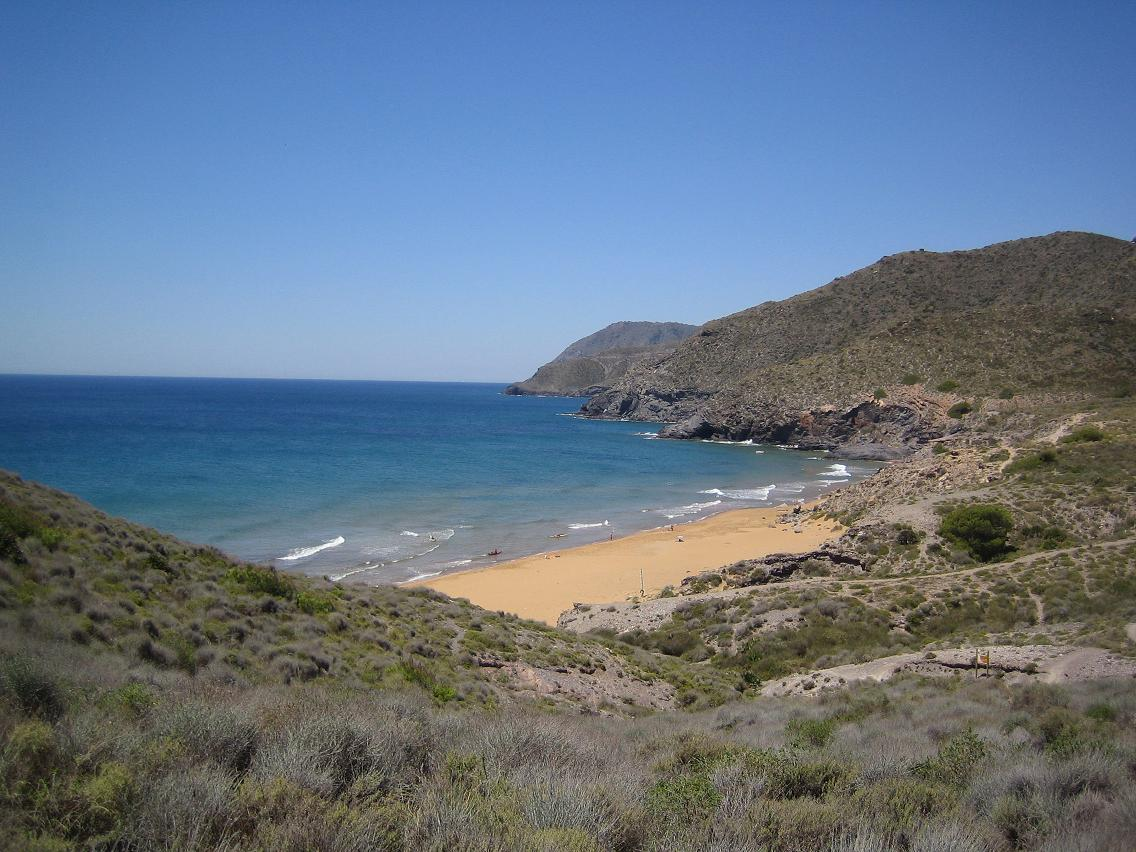
Calblanque Regional Park.

Rincón de San Ginés is located in the south-east of the municipality of Cartagena, and borders the Mediterranean Sea and the coastal saltwater lagoon Mar Menor. The Calblanque Regional Park is located in Rincón de San Ginés.

The district has a population of 9891, living in the following localities: Los Belones (2,304); La Manga del Mar Menor (2,087); Cabo de Palos (1051); Los Nietos (959); Playa Honda (933); Cala Reona (701); Cala Flores (689); Atamaría (360); Los Nietos Viejos (201); Barracas (176); Islas Menores (106); and Cobaticas (45).

There is paleontological evidence that the area was inhabited during the Lower Paleolithic. Some remains have been found in the Cueva de Los Mejillones cave.

In the mid-16th century, there was a defensive tower equipped with artillery in Cape Palos, located in this district. Cape Palos was uninhabited before 1865, when its lighthouse was built. Fishermen from Alicante, Mazarrón, and Almería had begun to spend long periods in the area, and settled and built dwellings there during the last quarter of the 19th century.

In 1900, there was a spa, with rooms, a restaurant, halls with a piano, and other facilities in Los Nietos alongside the fishermen's housing. The spa was frequented by wealthy families from Cartagena, La Unión and Murcia. Numerous festive and cultural ceremonies were held at the beach there in summer.

During the 1960s, the municipality of Cartagena experienced a State-promoted boom in tourism. Tourist resorts were established in Playa Honda and La Manga, from 1966 to 1969.

== Canteras ==
Canteras borders Cartagena Casco to the south-east, and the Mediterranean Sea to the south.

It has 10,285 inhabitants, living in the following localities: Canteras (4,530); Los Patojos (4,092); Tentegorra (706); Los Garcías (648); Los Díaz (245); and Algameca (64).

The name of the district, meaning 'quarries', derives from the presence of a sandstone quarry used during Roman times and in the 18th century.

== El Algar ==
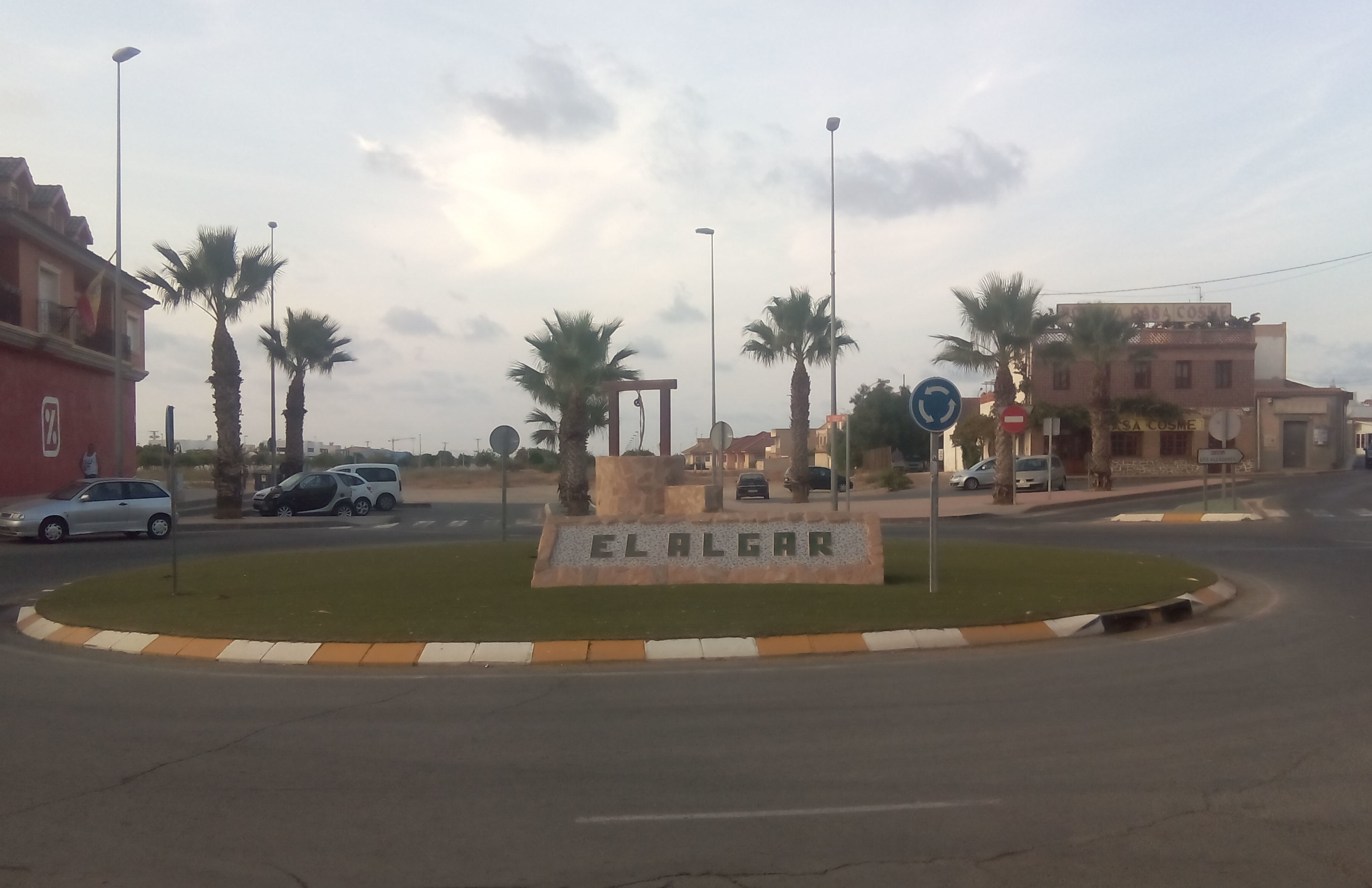
Main round-about of El Algar.

El Algar is located in the east of the municipality Cartagena, and borders the Mar Menor to the east.

The district has a population of 7,847 inhabitants, living in the following localities: El Algar (5,505); Las Lomas (1,484); Los Urrutias (802); Los Ruices (13); and Los Rizos (5).

The area was first inhabited by the Iberians, and later by the Romans, as attested by archaeological remains in the district. Historical research on the municipality of Cartagena shows the presence of farmsteads during the Islamic period of Al-Andalus (711–1492). The name El Algar comes from Arabic, and means 'hollow' or 'cave'.

== Santa Lucía ==
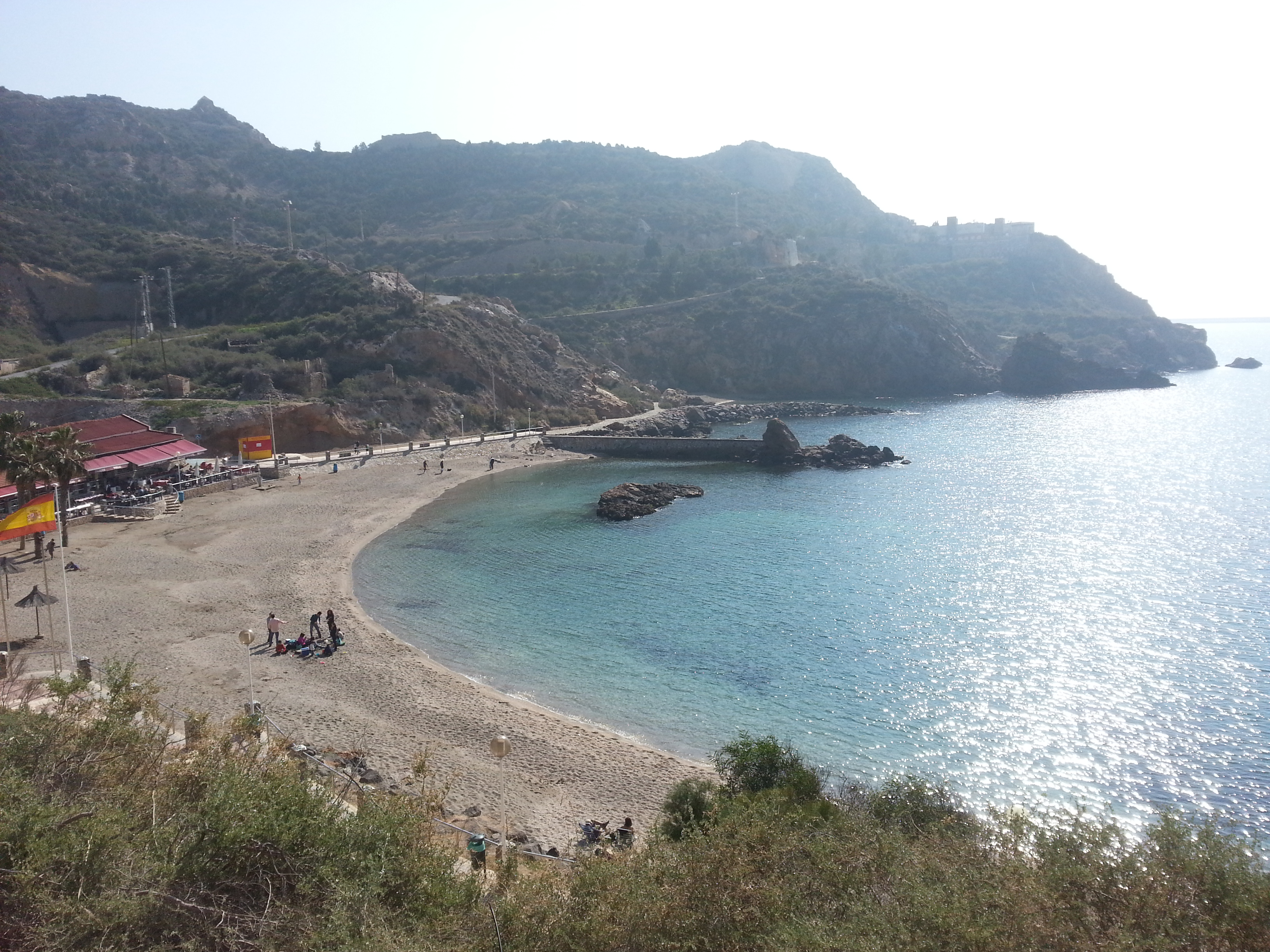
Cala Cortina, a beach in Santa Lucía district

Santa Lucía borders Cartagena Casco to the south-east, and adjoins the Mediterranean Sea to the south.

The district has a population of 6,874, living in the following localities: Santa Lucía (3,335); Los Mateos (2,097); and Lo Campano (1,448).

The main population centre, itself named Santa Lucía, was established during the era of Roman Hispania. It had a cemetery, and a sanctuary dedicated to Jupiter. The town was abandoned after destruction by the Vandals.

In the 17th century, the battery of Trincabotijas was built.

The 18th century saw an influx of immigrants to the Cartagena, attracted by the military construction work being undertaken in the town during that period. Due to a lack of space within the town walls, new arrivals settled in the surrounding neighbourhoods, including Santa Lucía.

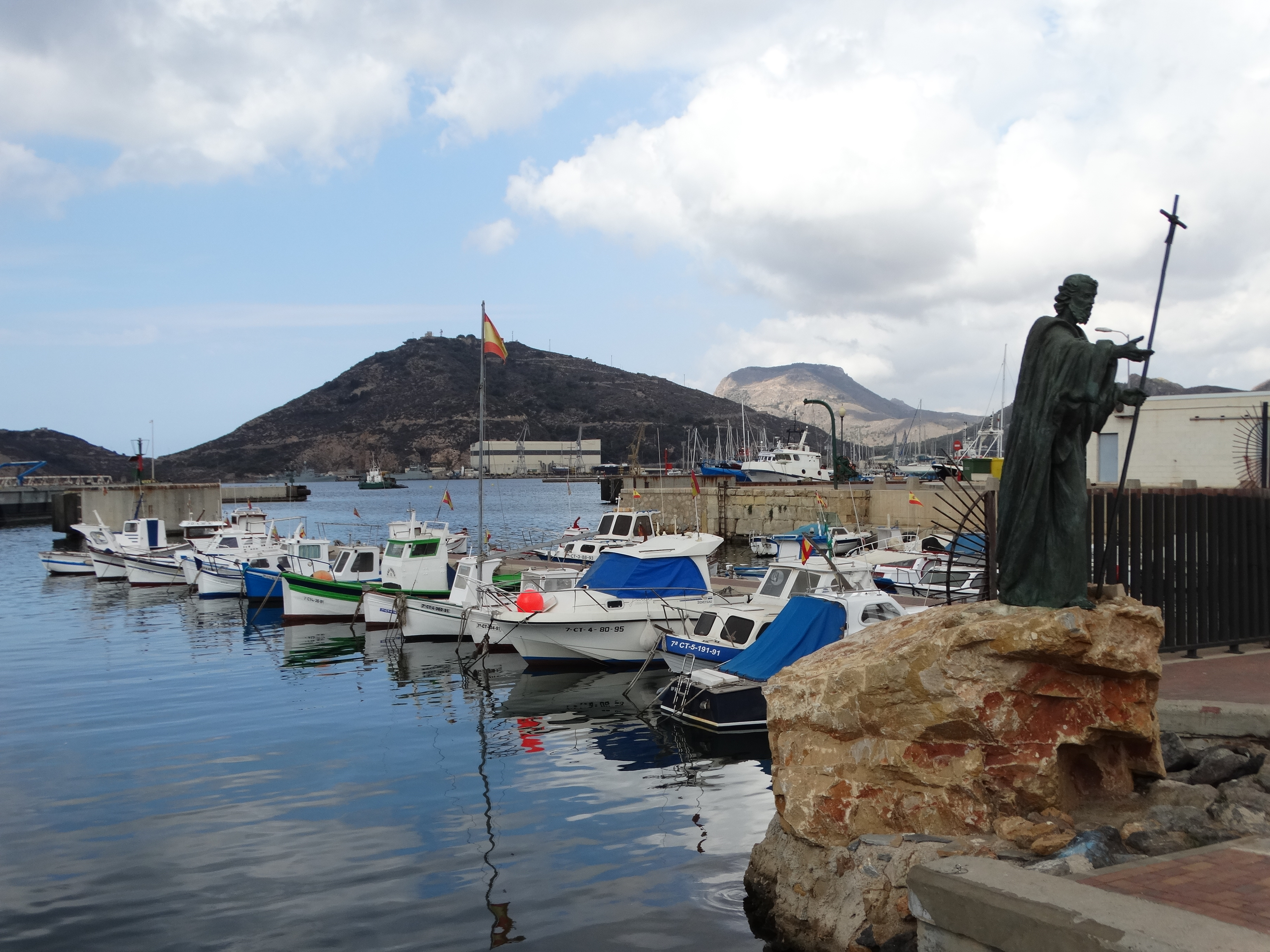
Statue of the apostle James the Greater, patron saint of Spain, in Santa Lucía's harbour.

Doing the 18th century, music and dance shows were put on by Spanish and foreign companies, and theatrical performances both professional and amateur.

In 1834, the Valarino family built a glass factory in this district.

During the second quarter of the 19th century, lead deposits were found in the Sierra Almagrera mountains in the Province of Almería. As the export of raw minerals was forbidden, lead processing factories were established in the municipality of Cartagena, including the Franco-Española foundry built in Santa Lucía in 1842.

The population centre of Lo Campano sprang up in the early 1970s.

== La Palma ==
La Palma is located in the north of the municipality of Cartagena.

The district has a population of 5,697, living in the following population centres: La Palma (3,655); La Aparecida (1,122); Fuente Amarga (246); Los Balanzas, (191); Los Salazares (142); Los Carriones (118); Los Conesus (103); Los Palma de Arriba (69); and Lo Campero (51).

The first documented references to this area recount the arrival of ranchers at a well surrounded by palm trees. There are also sources mentioning the presence of thirteen houses in 1561, and in 1580 the existence of a small sanctuary.

The parish of La Palma was established at the end of the 17th century.

== Pozo Estrecho ==
Pozo Estrecho is located in the north of the municipality of Cartagena, and borders La Aljorra to the east, and La Palma to the west.

The district has a population of 5,042, living in the following localities: Pozo Estrecho (4,527); La Rambla (152); Las Lomas (150); Los Sánchez (141); and Los Roses (72).

The first documentary source for this area dates back to 1515, and concerns a distribution of public lands.

The Spanish economic crisis of the 17th century led to a decline in urban economic activity and an exodus of people from the city of Cartagena to the surrounding rural areas. This phenomenon underlies the appearance of villages throughout the dispersed urban nucleus, of which Pozo Estrecho and La Palma are examples.

The parish of Pozo Estrecho was established in 1699, and the district's first theatre was inaugurated in Pozo Estrecho in 1860.

== La Aljorra ==
La Aljorra is located at the north-western end of the municipality of Cartagena.

The district has a population of 4,970 inhabitants, living in the following localities: La Aljorra (4,434); Los Navarro (98); Los Nicolas (89); Los Carrascosas (72); Los Nietos (61); Río Seco (50); Torre Calín (38); and Los Nietos (23).

The name of this area comes from the Arabic al-Hurra (the free woman; born to good social standing; not a slave). It is likely to have been the given name of a farmstead owner.

Archaeological remains of the Argaric culture have been found in the district.

There was little Roman presence in this area in the era of Roman Hispania, although some artefacts have been found near a ravine called the Rambla del Saudillo. These include Roman ceramic lamps, potsherds, and coins.

== La Magdalena ==
La Magdalena has a population of 3,877, living in the following localities: Molinos Marfagones (2,702); Los Segados (308); Pozo Los Palos (200); Cuesta Blanca de Abajo (140); La Magdalena (130); El Palmero (125); Los Carriones (118); San Isidro (116); Los Castillejos (94); and Los Simonetta (26).

There are few historical references to this district and its hamlets and villages. The first documentary sources date back to 1683.

== Alumbres ==
Alumbres has a population of 3,403, living in the following localities: Alumbres (1,955); Vista Alegre (1,136); Barranco (84); El Porche (63); El Ferriol (9); and El Gorguel (2).

Iberian peoples were this region, settling there to take advantage of resources such as esparto glass. The district also has archaeological remains of Roman inhabitation during the period of Roman Hispania between 207 BC and 476 AD.

The village was established in the early years of the 16th century, and developed in the 17th century.

On June 1558 eighteen Turks sailing in eight galiots disembarked on Cape Palos and entered Alumbres, plundering the hamlet and taking all of its inhabitants.

The settlement and its development were closely tied to the mining of alum, the Spanish word alumbre giving the area its name. The 1560 population of 250 diminished rapidly when alum mining declined, the locality having become dangerous because of attacks by plunderers. By 1587, Alumbres had 150 inhabitants.

The parish of Los Alumbres was established at the end of the 17th century.

== Albujón ==
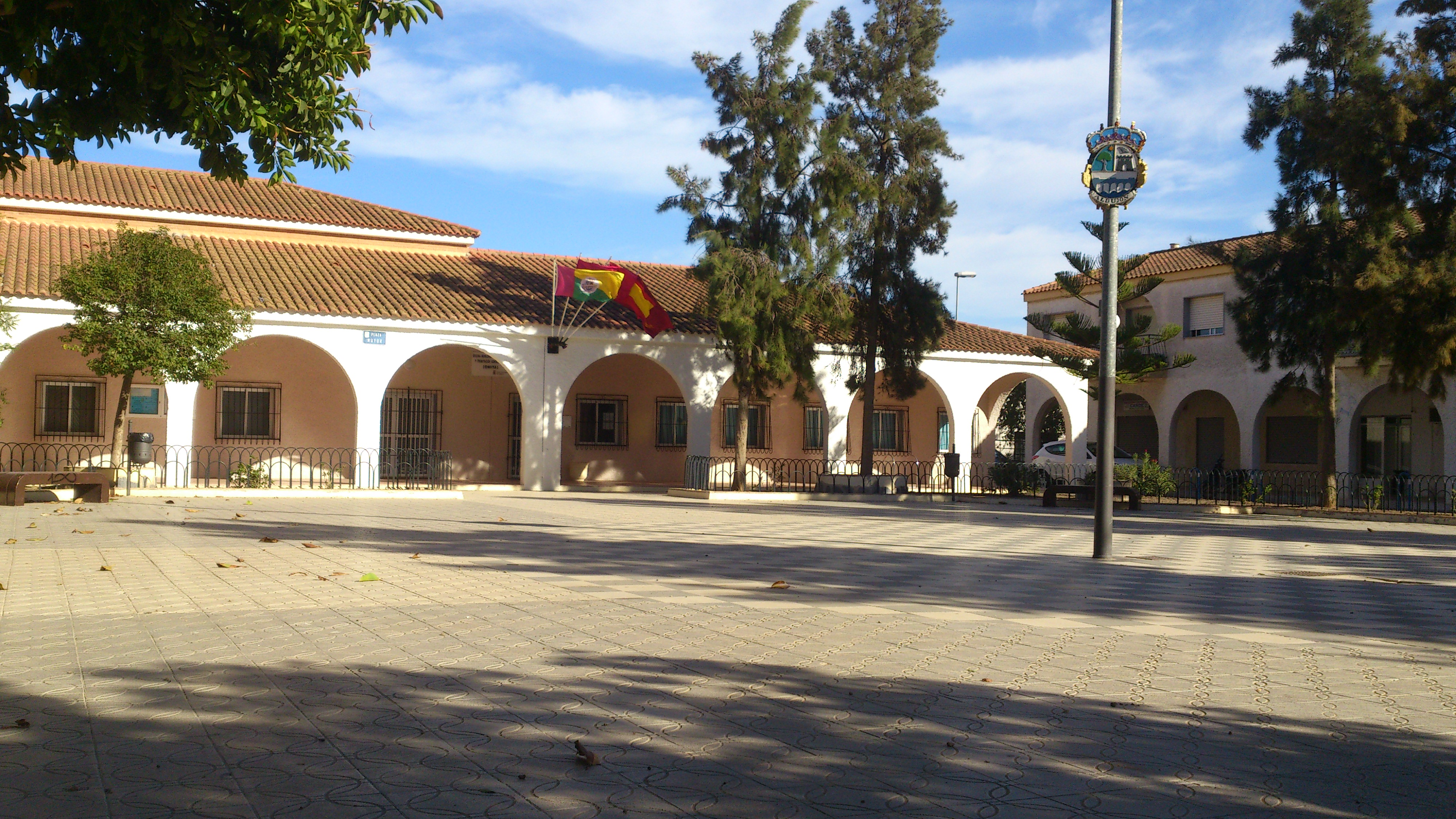
Main square of El Albujón.

Albujón is in the north-east of the municipality of Cartagena, and borders La Aljorra to the east.

The district has a population of 2,918 inhabitants, living in the following localities: Albujón (1991); Las Lomas (508); La Mina (164); Esparragueral (154); and Las Casas (95).

The most accepted theory concerning the district's name is that it comes from the Arab 'al-box' (small tower; small fort). There are documented references to rights to use water from the Rambla of Albujón. In 1509, several farmers used the water.

During the Spanish War of Succession, on 8 September 1706 there was fighting between Bourbon soldiers and the soldiers of Archduke Charles. .

== San Félix ==
San Félix has a population of 2,698, living in the following population centres: La Vereda (2,307); Los Camachos (173); Lo Baturno (117); La Asomada (68); La Piqueta (33); and Molinos Gallegos (26).

== Santa Ana ==
Santa Ana has a population of 2,505, living in the following localities: Santa Ana (1053); Los Piñuelas (727); Los Ventorrillos (572); and Molino Derribado (131).

== El Beal ==
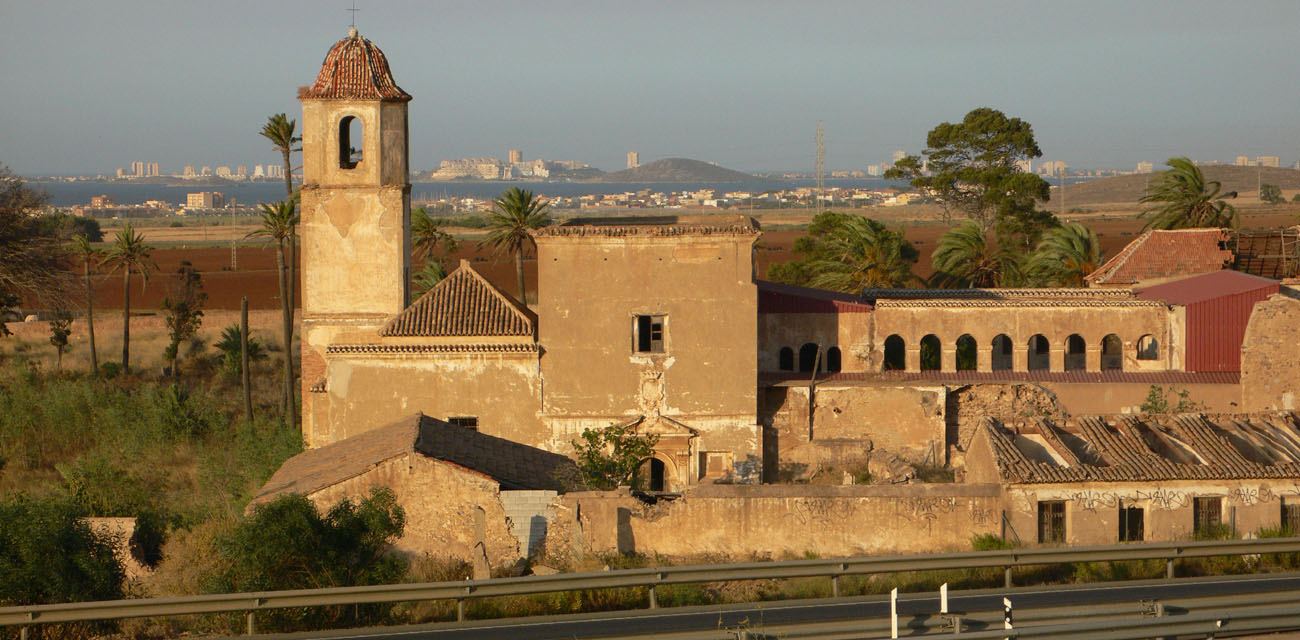
Ancient monastery named Monasterio San Ginés de la Jara. It may have been built in the 13th century.

El Beal is located in the east of the municipality of Cartagena, and borders the Mar Menor to the north-east, and El Algar to the north-west.

The district has a population of 2,280, living in the following localities: Llano de Beal (1288); El Estrecho de San Ginés (662); Beal (328); and San Ginés de la Jara (2).

In the 19th century, success and prosperity brought by mining activities in the Sierra Minera de Cartagena-La Unión mountains led to the establishment of villages such as El Estrecho and El Llano.

From 1910, Cartagena went into prolonged economic crisis as a result of a fall in the price of mining products such as lead, zinc, and iron. This crisis, aggravated by World War I (1914–1918), continued after the war. As a consequence, the population of El Beal declined. The district had a population of 6,140 in 1920, falling to 4,417 by 1930.

== Lentiscar ==
Lentiscar is located at the north-eastern end of the municipality of Cartagena, and borders the Mar Menor to the east.

The district has a population of 1,966, living in the following localities: La Puebla (1,122); Lo Tacón (219); Carmolí (196); Punta Brava (138); Los Beats (116); Los Roses (114); Los Rosiques (53); and Los Castillejos (18).

The name of the district derives from the plant Pistacia lentiscus (lentisk or mastic, lentisco in Spanish), which grew abundantly in the area in the past.

== Perín ==
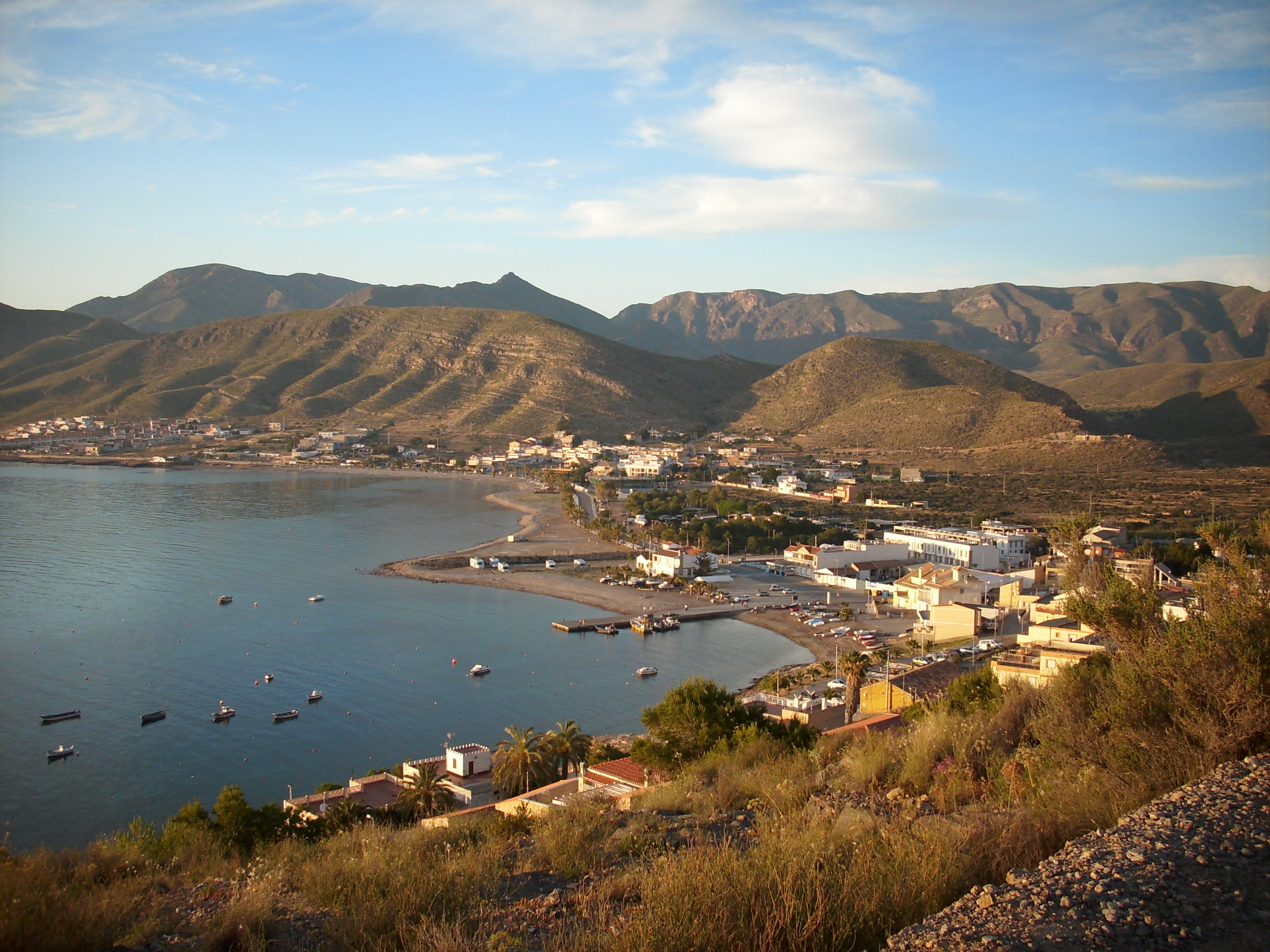
View of La Azohía.

Perín is located in the south of the municipality of Cartagena, bordering Canteras to the east, Los Puertos de Santa Bárbara to the west, and the Mediterranean Sea to the south.

The district has a population of 1,523, living in the following population centres: La Azohía (444); Galifa (282); La Corona (216); Perín (200); Los Flores (97); El Portús (76); and Campillo de Adentro (40).

During the Paleolithic era, there was Neanderthal occupation of the territory, and paleontological remains have been found in the Cueva Bermeja cave.

== Los Puertos de Santa Bárbara ==
Los Puertos de Santa Bárbara is located in the south-west of Cartagena, and borders Perín to the east, Campo Nubla to the north, and the Mediterranean Sea to the south.

The district has a population of 1,297 inhabitants, living in the following localities: Isla Plana (857); Los Puertos de Santa Bárbara (110); Los Cañavates (42); Los Álamos (28); Los Punches (26); Los Pérez de Arriba (22); Valdelentisco (22); and Los Fuentes (13).

Paleontological remains in the Cueva del Caballoa cave, close to Isla Plana, attest to Paleolithic occupation of this territory.

== Miranda ==
Miranda has a population of 1,365 inhabitants, living in the following localities: Miranda (1,090); Las Casicas (129); Los Vidales (91); and Los Gallos (55).

The first documented references to this district date back to the final years of the 16th century.

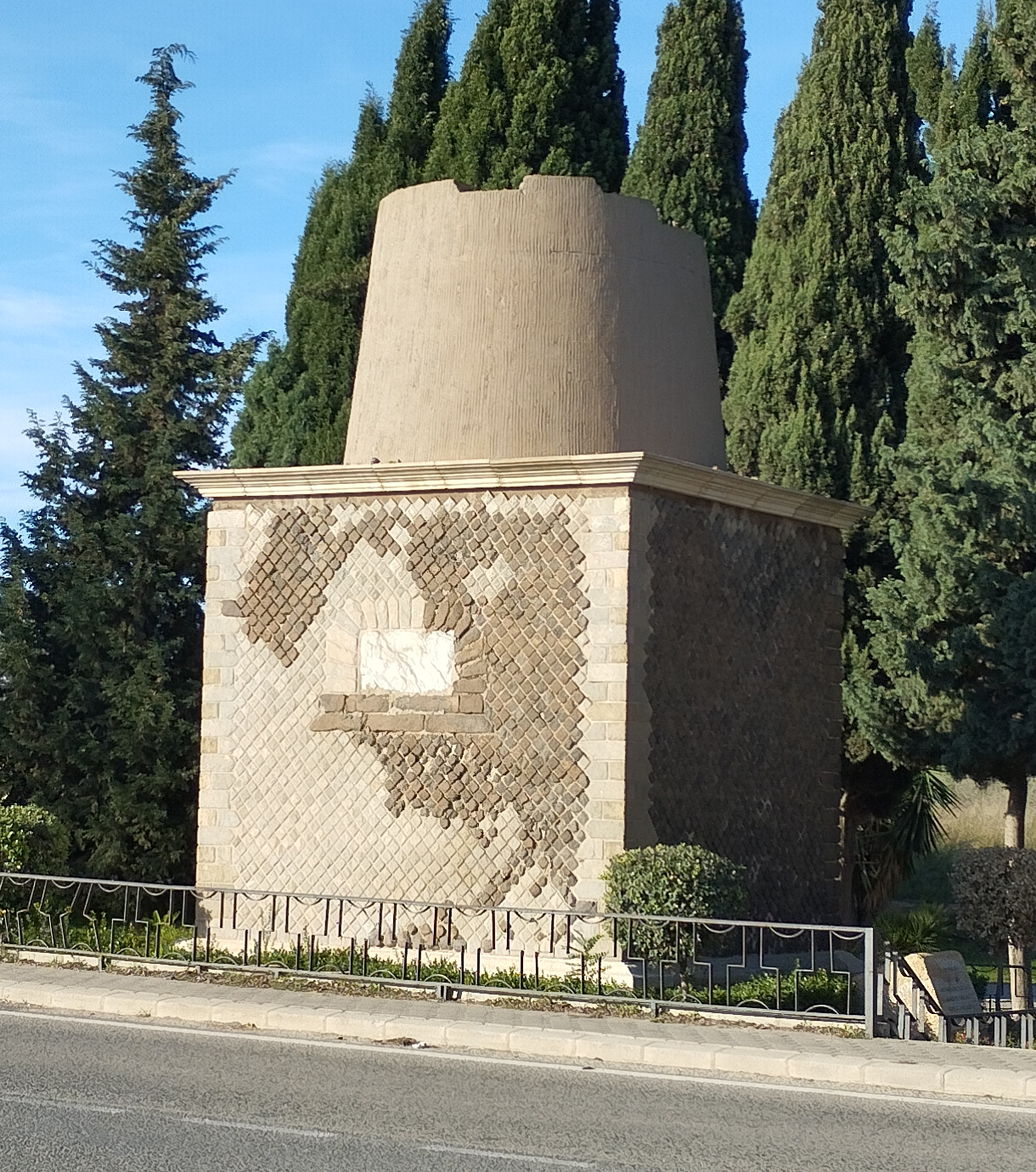

== El Hondón ==
El Hondón has a population of 1,080, living in the following localities: Torreciega (606); Media Legua (238); and Los Jorqueras (236).

The name Hondón comes from Arabic al-fundun, and has its origin in the Muslim rule in the Iberian Peninsula, (Al-Andalus) during the Middle Ages. The word may be a phonetic adaptation of the Latin fundum (dip, or hollow). Another possible etymology of this toponym derives from 11th century texts in which the word al-fundun appears refer to the fertility of the soils of Lorca.

== Campo Nubla ==
Campo Nubla has a population of 273, living in the following localities: Los Navarros Bajos (42); La Manchica; Rincón de Tallante; Casas de Tallante; Escabeas; Los Arroyos; and Casas del Molino.

There are archaeological remains of the Argaric culture near the hamlet of Tallante.

In the 16th century, there was a legal dispute between Cartagena, Murcia and Lorca over possession of the territory of the current district which, in that era, was uninhabited pastureland. The area was also known for cochineal, an insect producing a red dye valuable to the textile industry of the time.

== Los Médicos ==
Los Médicos has a population of 126 inhabitants, living in the following localities: Los Médicos (70); La Vereda (49); and Los Vidales (7).

The first documented references to this territory date back to 1703.

== Escombreras ==
Escombreras, which became an industrial area, has just 8 inhabitants.

There are few historical documentary sources concerning this area.

The name of this district comes from the Latin Scomber, the Atlantic mackerel, used to describe the ancient Roman fermented fish sauce, garum. During the era of Roman Hispania, there was some salt production in the area.

During the period of Islamic Hispania (al-Andalus 711–1492) some sluices, irrigation canals and ponds were built. There was probably a pirate base in this district from the last years of the IX century.

There are historical documentary references to Berbers taking refuge here in the 16th century, at a time when the Iberian Peninsula had already been reconquered.

There is evidence of the existence of simplified almadraba tuna-fishing traps, called tunairas, in the 15th century. In the following century these structures were more completely developed.

In 1942 there were plans to establish Spain's first oil refinery in the valley of Escombreras, for strategic and security reasons.

== See also ==
- Sierra minera de Cartagena-La Unión
