= Francisco Antonio Barbastro =

Franciscan missionary in New Spain

Francisco Antonio Barbastro (1735–1800) was a Franciscan missionary in New Spain.

== Biography ==
Barbastro was born in 1735 in Cariñena, Aragon, and arrived in the College of Santa Cruz de Querétaro in 1770. He was assigned to Mission San Miguel de Ures in 1773, and to Mission San Pedro y San Pablo del Tubutama in 1776 and from 1778 to 1783.

In 1777, Barbastro became president of the missions of the Pimería Alta, a position he held until 1795. In 1784, he was assigned to Mission Nuestra Señora de los Remedios de Banámichi, and succeeded Sebastián Flores as custos of San Carlos de Sonora; his efforts were instrumental to its 1791 abolition. By 1787, Barbastro was in Mission San Pedro Aconchi, where he remained until his death on June 22, 1800.

== Missionary work ==
Barbastro was fluent in the Opata and Pima languages. Historian John L. Kessell describes him as a "champion of Indian aptitude", who believed that the natives were capable of learning and had the same native talents as the Spanish settlers.

Barbastro opposed the efforts of Bishop Antonio de los Reyes to subordinate the missions to the newly created Diocese of Sonora. The conflict escalated, with complaints, appeals, and litigation on both sides; on March 13, 1785, de los Reyes imprisoned and questioned Barbastro. Barbastro was released soon after, but the animosity continued until de los Reyes's death in 1787.

In letters to his fellow missionaries, Barbastro defended Franciscan management of mission property, arguing that barter or payments through an intermediary did not violate the Franciscan vow of poverty. He also instructed that the church should be the first to benefit from native labor, with native widows, orphans, and invalids receiving aid only if surplus remained thereafter.
