= Yellu Santiago =

Spanish footballer

Personal information
- Full name: Jesús Santiago Pérez
- Date of birth: 25 May 2004 (age 22)
- Place of birth: El Estrecho de San Ginés, Spain
- Height: 1.92 m (6 ft 4 in)
- Position: Midfielder

Team information
- Current team: Marítimo (on loan from Hellas Verona)
- Number: 25

Youth career
- Deportiva Minera
- 2012–2017: Cartagena
- 2017–2018: Torre Pacheco
- 2018–2022: Valencia

Senior career*
Years	Team	Apps	(Gls)
2022–2024	Valencia B	41	(1)
2022–2024	Valencia	3	(0)
2024–2025	Getafe	33	(1)
2025–	Hellas Verona	2	(0)
2026	→ Arouca (loan)	5	(0)
2026–	→ Marítimo (loan)	1	(0)

International career^{‡}
2022	Spain U18	2	(0)
- * Club domestic league appearances and goals as of 5 September 2026 ‡ National team caps and goals as of 28 April 2022

Jesús Santiago Pérez (born 25 May 2004), sometimes known as Yellu, is a Spanish professional footballer who plays as a midfielder for Primeira Liga club Marítimo, on loan from Serie B side Hellas Verona.

== Club career ==
=== Valencia ===
Born in El Estrecho de San Ginés, Cartagena, Region of Murcia, Santiago joined Valencia CF's at the age of 14, after representing EF Torre Pacheco, FC Cartagena and CD Minera. On 5 February 2022, he first appeared with the reserves in a 2–2 Tercera División RFEF away draw against UD Benigànim, but was only an unused substitute.

On 1 April 2022, Santiago renewed his contract with the Che until 2026. Eighteen days later, he made his first team – and La Liga – debut, replacing Yunus Musah in a 0–2 away loss against Villarreal CF.

=== Getafe ===
On 10 January 2024, Santiago signed a contract with Getafe CF in the top tier until June 2025.

=== Hellas Verona ===
On 24 July 2025, Santiago joined Hellas Verona in Italy on a three-year contract.

==== Arouca (loan) ====
On 9 January 2026, after making just four appearances for Hellas Verona, he was sent on loan to Primeira Liga club Arouca until the end of the 2025–26 season.

==== Marítimo (loan) ====
On 31 July 2026, Santiago moved on a new loan in Portugal, this time to Marítimo.

== Career statistics ==
=== Club ===
As of match played 26 May 2024

Appearances and goals by club, season and competition
Club	Season	League			National cup		Other		Total	
Club	Season	Division	Apps	Goals	Apps	Goals	Apps	Goals	Apps	Goals
Valencia	2021–22	La Liga	3	0	0	0	—		3	0
Valencia B	2022–23	Segunda Federación	27	1	—		—		27	1
Valencia B	2023–24	Segunda Federación	14	0	—		—		14	0
Valencia B	Total		41	1	—		—		41	1
Getafe	2023–24	La Liga	14	1	0	0	—		14	1
Career total			58	2	0	0	0	0	58	2
