= José Isidro Guerrero Macías =

Mexican priest (1951–2022)

- Bishop of Mexicali
- Church: Catholic Church
- Diocese: Diocese of Mexicali
- In office: 31 May 1997 – 23 February 2022
- Predecessor: José Ulises Macías Salcedo
- Successor: Enrique Sánchez Martínez

Orders
- Ordination: 22 April 1973
- Consecration: 17 September 1997 by Justo Mullor García

Personal details
- Born: 31 May 1951 Iraguato (southwest of Licenciado Benito Juárez), Sinaloa, Mexico
- Died: 23 February 2022 (aged 70) Mexicali, Baja California, Mexico

José Isidro Guerrero Macías (31 May 1951 – 23 February 2022) was a Mexican Roman Catholic prelate.

== Biography ==
Guerrero Macías was born in Mexico and was ordained to the priesthood in 1973. He served as bishop of the Roman Catholic Diocese of Mexicali, Mexico, from 1997 until his death. Macías died from COVID-19 at age 70 in Mexicali on 22 February 2022, during the COVID-19 pandemic in Mexico.
