= Carlos Quintero Arce =

Mexican Catholic prelate

- Archbishop Emeritus of Archdiocese of Hermosillo
- Church: Roman Catholic Church
- See: Archdiocese of Hermosillo
- In office: 1968 - 1996
- Predecessor: Juan María Navarrete y Guerrero
- Successor: José Ulises Macías Salcedo

Orders
- Ordination: April 8, 1944
- Consecration: May 14, 1961 by José Garibi y Rivera

Personal details
- Born: February 13, 1920; Etzatlán, Mexico
- Died: February 15, 2016 (aged 96); Hermosillo, Mexico

Carlos Quintero Arce (February 13, 1920 – February 15, 2016) was a Mexican prelate of the Catholic Church.

== Priest ==
Quintero Arce was born in Etzatlán, Mexico, and was ordained a priest on April 8, 1944, for the Archdiocese of Guadalajara. He was appointed Bishop of the Diocese of Ciudad Valles on March 20, 1961, and consecrated on May 14, 1961. Quintero Arce was appointed Coadjutor Archbishop of the Archdiocese of Hermosillo on March 3, 1966, and succeeded as bishop upon retirement of Archbishop Juan María Navarrete y Guerrero on August 18, 1968. Quintero Arce retired from the Archdiocese of Hermosillo on August 20, 1996. He died at his home in Hermosillo, Sonora, on February 15, 2016, at the age of 96.
