= Vicente García Bernal =

Mexican Roman Catholic prelate

- Bishop of Ciudad Obregón
- Church: Catholic Church
- Diocese: Diocese of Ciudad Obregón
- In office: 30 March 1988 – 8 November 2005
- Predecessor: Luis Reynoso Cervantes
- Successor: Juan Manuel Mancilla Sánchez

Orders
- Ordination: 4 April 1953
- Consecration: 24 May 1988 by Girolamo Prigione

Personal details
- Born: 5 April 1929 Fresnillo, Zacatecas, Mexico
- Died: 26 November 2017 (aged 88) Ciudad Obregón, Sonora, Mexico

Vicente García Bernal (5 April 1929 – 26 November 2017) was a Mexican Roman Catholic prelate.

Born in Fresnillo, Zacatecas, García Bernal was ordained to the priesthood in 1953. He served as the Bishop of Ciudad Obregón from 1988 until his retirement in 2005. He died on 26 November 2017 in Ciudad Obregón, Sonora, at the age of 88.
