= José Ulises Macías Salcedo =

Mexican Roman Catholic prelate (1940–2026)

His Excellency José Ulises Macías Salcedo
- Archbishop Emeritus of Hermosillo
- Archdiocese: Hermosillo
- Appointed: 20 August 1996
- Installed: 29 October 1996
- Term ended: 26 April 2016
- Predecessor: Carlos Quintero Arce
- Successor: Ruy Rendón Leal
- Previous post: Bishop of Mexicali (1984–1996)

Orders
- Ordination: 10 April 1966
- Consecration: 29 July 1984 by Girolamo Prigione, Manuel Pérez-Gil y González and Anselmo Zarza Bernal

Personal details
- Born: 19 October 1940 León, Guanajuato, Mexico
- Died: 22 April 2026 (aged 85) Hermosillo, Sonora, Mexico
- Motto: Vinculum amoris et unitatis

Styles of José Ulises Macias Salcedo
- Reference style: The Most Reverend
- Spoken style: Your Excellency
- Religious style: Monsignor
- Posthumous style: not applicable

José Ulises Macías Salcedo (Note: In this Mexican name, the surname is Macías and the second or maternal family name is Salcedo.) (29 October 1940 – 22 April 2026) was a Mexican Roman Catholic prelate who served as bishop of Mexicali (1984–1996) and archbishop of Hermosillo (1996–2016).

== Biography ==
Macías Salcedo was born in León, Guanajuato, on 29 October 1940.

He studied humanities in the Seminary of his native city, and studied philosophy and theology at the Pontifical Gregorian University in Rome, where later received a Licentiate in Philosophy.

Macías Salcedo was then ordained a priest in León on 10 April 1966.

Named bishop for the Diocese of Mexicali by Pope John Paul II, on 16 June 1984, and consecrated on 29 July, in the city of Mexicali, presided over by Apostolic Delegate Archbishop Girolamo Prigione.

Pope John Paul II named him the third Archbishop of the Archdiocese of Hermosillo on 19 August 1996, and he took possession on 29 October of the same year.

Macías Salcedo retired in 2016, and died on 22 April 2026, at the age of 85.

== Notes ==
Catholic Church titles
Preceded by Carlos Quintero Arce	Archbishop of Hermosillo; 1996–2016	Succeeded by Ruy Rendón Leal
Preceded by Manuel Pérez-Gil y González	Bishop of Mexicali; 1984–1996	Succeeded by José Isidro Guerrero Macías
