= Diocese of Ciudad Obregón =

Roman Catholic diocese in Mexico

Coordinates: 27.4988°N 109.9301°W

Diocese of Ciudad Obregón Dioecesis Civitatis Obregonensis Diócesis de Ciudad Obregón

Location
- Country: Mexico
- Ecclesiastical province: Province of Hermosillo
- Metropolitan: Ciudad Obregón

Statistics
- Area: 34,125 sq mi (88,380 km^{2})
- Population: Total; Catholics: (as of 2006); 1,031,000; 889,000 (86.2%)
- Parishes: 58

Information
- Denomination: Roman Catholic
- Rite: Roman Rite
- Established: 20 June 1959 (66 years ago)
- Cathedral: Cathedral of the Sacred Heart of Jesus

Current leadership
- Pope: Leo XIV
- Bishop elect: Rutilo Felipe Pozos Lorenzini

Map
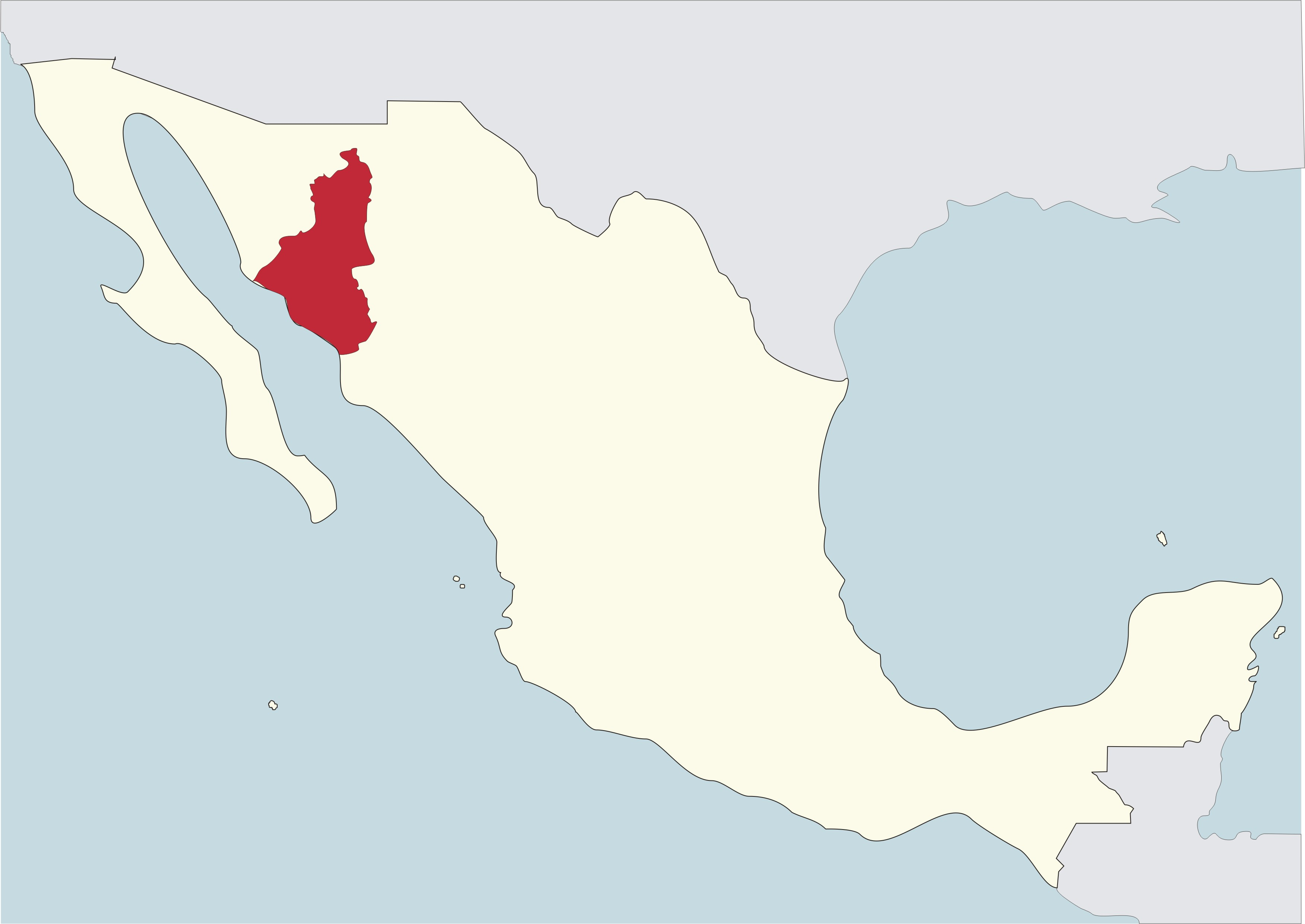

The Roman Catholic Diocese of Ciudad Obregón (Latin: Dioecesis Civitatis Obregonensis) (erected 20 June 1959). It is centered in Ciudad Obregón, Sonora, Mexico. It is a suffragan diocese of the Archdiocese of Hermosillo. Along with the Archdiocese of Chihuahua and the Diocese of Ciudad Juárez, it yielded territory in 1966 to form the Territorial Prelature of Madera.

== Bishops ==
=== Ordinaries ===
- José de la Soledad Torres y Castañeda (28 November 1959 – 4 March 1967)
- Miguel González Ibarra (15 July 1967 – 14 November 1981)
- Luis Reynoso Cervantes (15 July 1982 – 17 August 1987), appointed Bishop of Cuernavaca, Morelos
- Vicente García Bernal (30 March 1988 – 8 November 2005)
- Juan Manuel Mancilla Sánchez (8 November 2005 – 18 June 2009), appointed Bishop of Texcoco
- Felipe Padilla Cardona (1 October 2009 – 15 September 2020)
- Rutilo Felipe Pozos Lorenzini (15 September 2020 — present)

=== Other priest of this diocese who became bishop ===
- Sigifredo Noriega Barceló, appointed Bishop of Ensenada, Baja California in 2007

== Episcopal See ==
- Ciudad Obregón, Sonora
