= Diocese of Mexicali =

Roman Catholic diocese in Mexico

Diocese of Mexicali Dioecesis Mexicalensis Diócesis de Mexicali
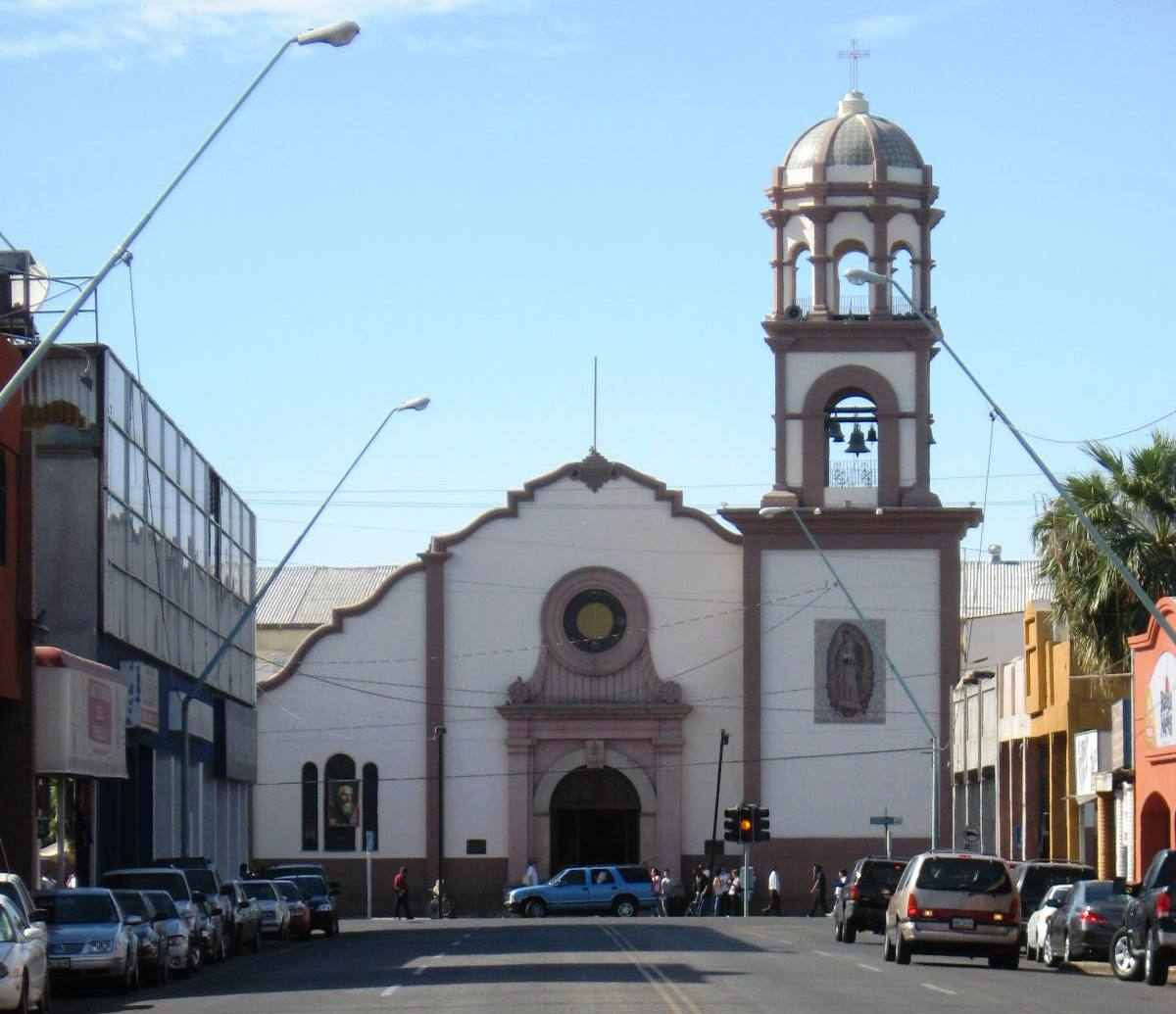
- Catedral de Nuestra Señora de Guadalupe

Location
- Country: Mexico
- Ecclesiastical province: Archdiocese of Tijuana
- Metropolitan: Tijuana

Statistics
- Area: 22,788 sq mi (59,020 km^{2})
- Population: Total; Catholics: (as of 2004); 1,705,001; 1,317,533 (77.3%)
- Parishes: 51

Information
- Denomination: Roman Catholic
- Rite: Roman Rite
- Established: 25 March 1966 (59 years ago)
- Cathedral: Cathedral of Our Lady of Guadalupe

Current leadership
- Pope: Leo XIV
- Bishop: Enrique Sánchez Martínez

Map

Website
- http://diocesisdemexicali.org

The Roman Catholic Diocese of Mexicali (Latin: Dioecesis Mexicalensis) (erected 25 March 1966) is a suffragan diocese of the Archdiocese of Tijuana. It was a suffragan of the Archdiocese of Hermosillo until 25 November 2006.

== Bishops ==
=== Ordinaries ===
- Manuel Pérez-Gil y González (1966 - 1984), appointed Bishop of Tlalnepantla, México
- José Ulises Macías Salcedo (1984 - 1996), appointed Archbishop of Hermosillo, Sonora
- José Isidro Guerrero Macías (1997 - 2022)

=== Other priests of this diocese who became bishops ===
- Jesús José Herrera Quiñonez, appointed Bishop of Nuevo Casas Grandes, Chihuahua in 2011
- José Fortunato Álvarez Valdéz, appointed Bishop of Gómez Palacio, Durango in 2015

== Territorial losses ==
Year	Along with	To form
2007	Archdiocese of Tijuana	Diocese of Ensenada

== Episcopal See ==
- Mexicali, Baja California

== External links and references ==
- "Diocese of Mexicali". Catholic-Hierarchy.
