= Daniel Januske =

Jesuit missionary (1661–1724)

Daniel Januske (1661–1724; also Januusqui, Jarniuke, Janusque) was a Jesuit missionary in New Spain.

== Biography ==
Januske was born in 1661 in Wrocław, Silesia, and joined the Society of Jesus at the age of fifteen. He arrived in New Spain in 1693, in a group of missionaries which included Agustín de Campos and Juan Bautista Barli. There he was assigned to Mission San Pedro y San Pablo del Tubutama, where he repeatedly employed soldiers and overseers to punish natives who disobeyed or displayed resistance. Historian Brandon Bayne characterizes this practice as a "crucial contributing factor[...] if not the immediate cause" of the 1695 Pima Revolt.

By 1715, Januske was serving at Mission San Miguel Arcángel de Oposura. There, he clashed repeatedly with local vecinos Bernardo and Juan Grivalja over issues of land rights and cattle ranching. In one incident, Bernardo called Januske a drunkard and accused him of monopolizing local farmland and of forcing natives to do unpaid labor for him instead of working their own land; on another occasion, Januske flogged Juan's native father-in-law for failing to attend Mass, and both Grivalja brothers confronted him, shouting threats and insults. Januske was eventually able to persuade the local alcalde mayor to expel the Grivaljas from the pueblo.

In 1722, Januske was appointed visitador of Sonora. He died in 1724 in Oposura.
