= Antonio de los Reyes =

Roman Catholic bishop (1729–1787)

Antonio de los Reyes (1729–1787) was the first bishop of the Catholic diocese of Sonora.

== Biography ==
Antonio Vicente Gorgonio was born on September 11, 1729, in Aspe, Spain. His parents were Antonio Vicente de los Reyes and Josefa María Carrasco. He entered the Franciscan Monasterio San Ginés de la Jara in Cartagena on February 16, 1746. In 1754 he was transferred to the convent of Santa Ana in Orihuela, and in 1756 he was placed in charge of the novitiate of Cehegín.

On August 1, 1763, de los Reyes and twelve other missionaries departed for New Spain from Cádiz, accompanying a mission led by Domingo Elizondo. They landed in Veracruz that November, and de los Reyes made a circuit of the missions of the area before arriving at the monastery of Santa Cruz in spring 1765. There, in 1766, de los Reyes was appointed vicar superior.

After the 1767 Jesuit expulsion from Mexico, Franciscan missionaries replaced the Jesuits in the Sonoran missions. A group led by de los Reyes left Querétaro on August 5. The governor of Sonora, Juan Claudio de Pineda, assigned de los Reyes to Mission Los Santos Reyes de Cucurpe, where he arrived in June 1768. In 1771, de los Reyes was appointed procurator, and relocated to Mexico City. He traveled there by way of Querétaro, arriving at his final destination in early 1772.

In 1777, de los Reyes left Mexico for Spain, landing in La Coruña. From there he traveled by land to Madrid, where he met with Charles III of Spain to discuss the status of the missions. For several years, de los Reyes remained in Madrid, cultivating influence at court.

On August 17, 1780, the King appointed de los Reyes bishop of the newly created diocese of Sonora. He was approved by the papal consistory on December 11, departed from Málaga on March 20, 1782, and landed in Veracruz on August 5, 1782. On September 15, Alonso Núñez de Haro y Peralta consecrated de los Reyes as a bishop.

After a long journey over land, de los Reyes arrived in his new see of Arizpe on September 22, 1783, bearing a royal charter which declared the small town a city. After less than a month, de los Reyes petitioned for his see to be transferred to Álamos, where he took up residence towards the end of the year.

On January 31, 1784, José de Gálvez sent de los Reyes a letter instructing him to create a census of the missions of Northwestern Mexico for Charles III of Spain. De los Reyes worked on the census for a number of months with the help of Father Miguel Antonio Cuevas and a few other trusted individuals and sent the census to de Gálvez in mid September of 1784.

On March 6, 1787, de los Reyes died of a "malignant fever".
