= Roman Catholic Diocese of Nogales =

Roman Catholic diocese in Mexico

Diocese of Nogales Dioecesis Nucensis Diócesis de Nogales

Location
- Country: Mexico
- Metropolitan: Archdiocese of Hermosillo
- Headquarters: Nogales, Sonora, Mexico

Statistics
- Area: 44,244 km^{2} (17,083 sq mi)
- Population: Total; Catholics: (as of 2023); 568,355; 404,169 (71.1%)
- Parishes: 32

Information
- Denomination: Catholic Church
- Sui iuris church: Latin Church
- Rite: Roman Rite
- Established: 19 March 2015; 11 years ago
- Cathedral: Catedral Santuario de Nuestra Señora de Guadalupe in Nogales
- Patron saint: Our Lady of Guadalupe
- Secular priests: 55 (49 Diocesan, 6 Religious Orders)

Current leadership
- Pope: Leo XIV
- Bishop: José Luis Cerra Luna
- Metropolitan Archbishop: Ruy Rendón Leal

Map

The Roman Catholic Diocese of Nogales is a Latin bishopric of the Roman Catholic Church.

It is a suffragan of the Metropolitan Archdiocese of Hermosillo, from which it was branched off in 2015. Its episcopal cathedral see is the Catedral Santuario de Nuestra Señora de Guadalupe, in the city of Nogales, a municipal seat in the Mexican state of Sonora.

== History ==
It was established on 19 March 2015, when its diocesan territory was split off from its present Metropolitan, the Archdiocese of Hermosillo.

== Leadership ==
=== Bishops of Nogales ===
- José Leopoldo González González (19 March 2015 – 19 March 2024), appointed Bishop of San Juan de los Lagos, Jalisco
  - Apostolic Administrator Ruy Rendón Leal (27 May 2024 – 10 September 2025), Archbishop of Hermosillo
- José Luis Cerra Luna (20 June 2025 – Present)

=== Another priest of this diocese who became bishop ===
- Mauricio Urrea Carrillo (2015-2020), appointed Bishop of Parral, Chihuahua

== See also ==
- Catholic Church in Mexico
