= El Algar =

- Municipality district
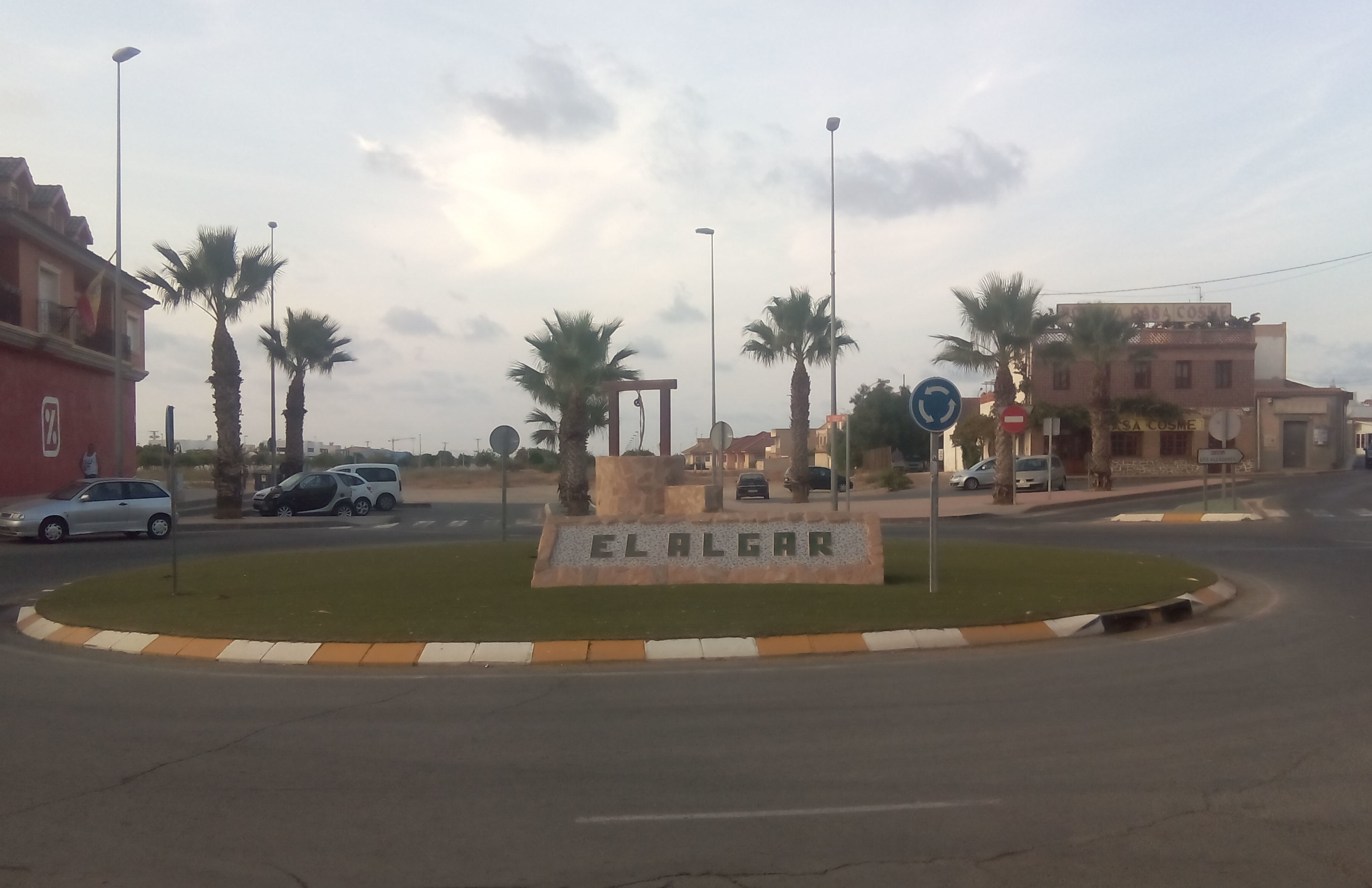

- Location in Spain El Algar (Spain)
- Coordinates: 37°38′48.7316″N 0°52′0.2185″W
- Country: Spain
- Autonomous community: Murcia
- Province: Province of Murcia
- Comarca: Campo de Cartagena
- Judicial district: Cartagena
- Municipality: Cartagena

Government
  - Mayor: Noelia María Arroyo Hernández

Area
  - Total: 26.659 km^{2} (10.293 sq mi)

Population (2020-01-01)
  - Total: 7,961
  - Density: 298.6/km^{2} (773.4/sq mi)
- Demonym: Algareños
- Time zone: UTC+1 (CET)
  - Summer (DST): UTC+2 (CEST)
- Postal code: 30366, 30368 (North-east of the district)
- Dialing code: (+34) 968

El Algar is a district of the Spanish municipality Cartagena. It is located in the east of Cartagena and has an area of 26.659 km^{2}. It shares borders with Lentiscar at its north, San Félix at its east, La Unión municipality at its south east, El Beal at its south-west and a coastal salty lagoon named Mar Menor at its north-west. In 2019, 7,961 people were registered as inhabitants of the district.

== Geography ==
=== Physical geography ===
The territory of the district is quite flat and there is only very few raised landforms: a hillock named Cabezo Álvarez, half of a hill named Cabezo de la Cruz, most of Cabezo del Atalaya, and a volcanic hill close to Mar Menor named El Carmolí. There are some flat spots like Fuente del Sapo and Saladar de Lo Poyo, which is coastal. No beds with constant water flow traverse the district, but there are four ramblas (dry water beds but during rainy periods) in El Algar.

=== Human geography ===
In El Algar there are six localities. The main one is El Algar, with a population of 5,567. The second most populated area is Las Lomas, where 1,499 people live. There is also a village in the northeast of the territory named Los Urrutias; 848 people reside there and it's next to Mar Menor. A residential population centre also occupies El Algar called Estrella de Mar, with a population of 275 and it's also coastal. There are also two hamlets: Los Rizos and Los Ruices. The first one is in the north of the district and four people live there. The second one is in the south and has a population of ten.

== History ==
There is evidence of human presence during the era of Ancient Rome in archaeological sites related to former villae, mining and metallurgic spots and farming sites. The territory was probably uninhabited during the late Roman Empire. During the Middle Ages, some path crossings occupied El Algar, according to some historians. Herds must have passed by the territory when being led to a mountain range named Sierra Minera. As a consequence, a settlement of shepherds was gradually set up. There are document references that date back to the years 1555 and 1565.

During the Trienio Liberal, El Algar was not part of Cartagena municipality as it is today, but of a municipality that existed during that period of time. This also covered the current districts of Cartagena El Beal and Rincón de San Ginés. When the period ended and an absolutist government system was again established, the new municipality ceased to exist and El Algar again belonged to Cartagena.

A mining boom took place in the current municipality of La Unión during the second half of the 19th century and the early 20th century. Owing to the proximity of El Algar to La Unión, some landowners received profits resulting from shares in mining enterprises from the adjoining municipality. These affluent people from El Algar resulted in the construction of the area's landmark buildings.

In the first half of the 20th century, there was stagnation in El Algar as a consequence of the decline in mining. Many inhabitants were prompted to migrate to Catalonia. In 1914, there was a trichinosis epidemic affecting 275 people.

== Demographics ==
16.89% of the inhabitants are foreigners – 4.515% come from other European countries, 10.925% are Africans, 1.03% are Americans and 0.34% are Asians. 18.78% inhabitants are younger than 15 years, which is approximately 4.28% above the nationwide average; 16.117% locals from 15 to 30 years of age, which is approximately 0.58% above the percentage for that age range in the rest of the country and 20.09% inhabitants aged more than 60 years, which is approximately 5.82% below the national level. The number of inhabitants during the 21st century can be seen in the table below.

	2000	2005	2010	2015	2019	2025
Population	5,159	6,311	7,262	7,845	7,961	8,789

== Facilities ==
=== Healthcare ===
As it is part of Cartagena municipality, El Algar is included in the Health area II (Cartagena). A consultorio (primary care centre with fewer functions than the centros de salud) is located in Los Urrutias and a centro de salud in the main town.

=== Education ===
Two early childhood and primary education centres (CEIP) are located in the main town, a secondary education centre (IES) is also located there, and an early childhood and primary education centre can be found in Los Urrutias.

== Transportation ==
A highway under the autonomous community (Spanish region) named RM-12 traverses the southern part of the district from the south-west to the south-east and south of the main locality. A state competency road named N-332 is located in the eastern half of the territory and traverses it from the north-west to the south-west and is also present in the main town.

There is a bus service connecting the town to Cartagena as well as bus service with transportation to and from Murcia, but it is infrequent.

== Sports ==
One of the more popular sports teams is the football team Club Deportivo El Algar (C.D. El Algar). There is also a women's volleyball team called Surmenor.

Every year, a popular race, Subida a la Fuente del Sapo, occurs on one of the last days of August. An exceptional sport fact related to El Algar was Vuelta España 2018 (a Spanish national cycling competition) – part of the sixth stage of the race occupied the main town of the district.

The sports facilities in the district are a pavilion and a football pitch.

== Main sights ==
- Casa Rubio: a dwelling owned by a well-off man who had received economic profits from the mining activities of La Unión. It was built in 1895.
- Apolo Theatre: built in 1905.
- Zamar carriage museum: the museum includes carriages and old motorcycles.
- Villa María
- Windmills: In Campo de Cartagena, there are windmills which are typical of the area; some of them are located in El Algar.

== Festivities ==
The festive events that occur in the district are listed below:

- Patron saint festival: It starts on 31 August and ends on 15 September. Activities during this period include a rock festival, a novena, a pasacalles (similar to standard parades), an opening address, a carrera de cintas (race on horseback where the rider has to take a ribbon) and a procession dedicated to the patron virgin.
- Romería of Los Llanos patron virgin: It takes place in the late September.
- Festivity in Los Urrutias: It takes place in several days during the summer, in the very late June, July and August, and ends in the early September.
