= Enrique Sánchez Martínez =

Bishop of Mexicali

The Most Reverend Enrique Sánchez Martínez
- Bishop of Mexicali
- Church: Roman Catholic Church
- Archdiocese: Durango
- See: Durango
- Appointed: September 11, 2023

Orders
- Ordination: June 29, 1986

Personal details
- Born: December 2, 1960 (age 65) Cuencamé, Mexico

Enrique Sánchez Martínez (born December 2, 1960) is a Mexican clergyman. He is the IV elected Catholic bishop of Mexicali since September 11, 2023.

== Biography ==
Enrique Sánchez Martínez was born in Cuencamé, Durango on December 2, 1960. He completed his primary and secondary studies in Cuencamé. From 1975 to 1985 he studied Catholic philosophy and theology at the Durango seminary.

He continued his studies in Rome, where he obtained the baccalaureate in social sciences and the licentiate in sociology from the Pontifical Gregorian University in 1989.

== Priesthood ==
On June 29, 1986, Sánchez Martínez received the sacrament of ordination for the Archdiocese of Durango from the Archbishop of Durango, Antonio López Aviña, in the Durango Cathedral.

He taught at the Durango seminary from 1990 to 2003 and also served as an economist from 1990 to 1992. He was also responsible for social pastoral care in the Archdiocese of Durango from 1990 to 1994. He was also secretary of the Presbyteral Council (1990–1993) and diocesan economist (1992–2005), as well as diocesan advisor to the Marriage Encounter (1994–2005) and Encuentros de Novios (1998–2005) movements. In addition, he worked from 1990 to 1994 and from 1997 to 2005 as chaplain of the Daughters of the Heart of Mary and from 1997 to 2005 of the Missionary Daughters of the Most Pure Virgin Mary and from 1994 to 1997 as parochial vicar of the parish of San Pedro and San Pablo in Durango. Since 2004, he was regional vicar of pastoral care and, since 2005, also parish priest of the parish of Santa Elena in Río Grande, Zacatecas.

== Episcopate ==
=== Auxiliary bishop of Durango ===
Pope Benedict XVI named him titular bishop of Thamugadi and auxiliary bishop of Durango on July 21, 2008. Archbishop Christophe Pierre ordained him bishop on October 10 of the same year at the Durango Convention and Fair Center. His motto Videns eum misericordia motus est (“When he saw him, he had compassion”).

As auxiliary bishop, he was also vicar general of the Archdiocese of Durango and coordinated the work of the diocesan commission for the clergy. He also headed the Commission on Family, Life, Youth and Laity in the Ecclesiastical Province of Durango.

=== Bishop of Nuevo Laredo ===
The Pope Francis appointed him Bishop of Nuevo Laredo on November 16, 2015, his possession took place on January 13 of the following year.

=== Bishop of Mexicali ===
On September 11, 2023, the Pope Francis named him the IV Bishop of Mexicali..

In the Episcopal Conference of Mexico, Sánchez Martínez was also responsible for health ministry from 2009 to 2015. He also served as a substitute member from 2016 to 2018 and as a member of the Permanent Council of Bishops of the Monterrey Region since 2018. In addition, Sánchez Martínez has been a member of the group of bishops of the Mexico-United States border region since 2016. He has also chaired the Penitentiary Pastoral Commission of the Episcopal Conference since 2021.
