= Archdiocese of Hermosillo =

Catholic archdiocese in Mexico

Coordinates: 29.0751°N 110.9600°W

Archdiocese of Hermosillo Archidioecesis Hermosillensis Arquidiócesis de Hermosillo
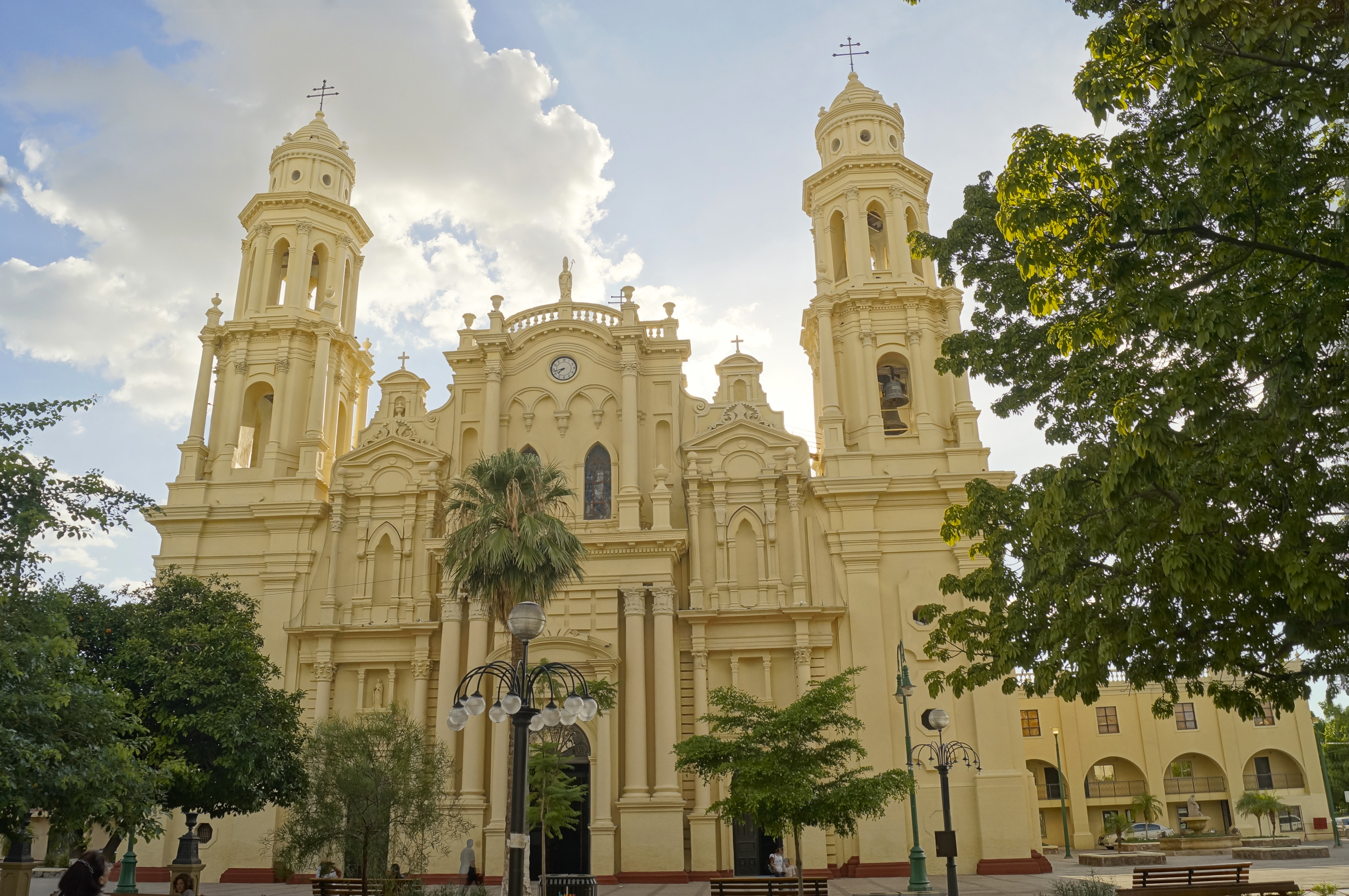
- Catedral de la Asunción

Location
- Country: Mexico
- Ecclesiastical province: Province of Hermosillo

Statistics
- Area: 35,132 sq mi (90,990 km^{2})
- Population: Total; Catholics: (as of 2006); 1,100,322; 1,003,489 (91.2%)
- Parishes: 58

Information
- Denomination: Catholic
- Sui iuris church: Latin Church
- Rite: Roman Rite
- Established: 7 May 1779 (247 years ago)
- Cathedral: Cathedral of the Assumption

Current leadership
- Pope: Leo XIV
- Archbishop: Ruy Rendon Leal

Map

The Archdiocese of Hermosillo (Latin: Archidioecesis Hermosillensis) is a Roman Catholic Archdiocese located in Hermosillo, Sonora, Mexico. Its area is 90,959 sq. miles, and its population (2004) 1,067,051. The bishop resides at Hermosillo.

The Archdiocese of Hermosillo is a Metropolitan Archdiocese. Until 2006, its suffragan dioceses were the dioceses of Ciudad Obregón, La Paz, Mexicali and Tijuana but on November 26, 2006, Tijuana became an archdiocese and Metropolitan while Mexicali and La Paz became suffragan dioceses of the latter. Currently, the Archdiocese of Hermosillo has three suffragan dioceses: Ciudad Obregón and Culiacán, and the newly created (in 2015) Nogales.

The Diocese of Hermosillo was originally created as the Diocese of Sonora (with the see in Arizpe) on May 7, 1779. In 1888 the see was moved to Hermosillo. On September 1, 1959 the name was changed to Diocese of Hermosillo; it was elevated to Archdiocese on July 13, 1963.

The current Archbishop of Hermosillo is Ruy Rendon Leal.

The Archdiocese is headed in Hermosillo Cathedral.

== History ==
The Gospel was first preached in the territory by the celebrated Father Niza, who accompanied the daring expeditions of the first explorers and conquerors of Mexico. The Spaniards settled at different places in this section; they evangelized the numerous tribes who lived in that region in the beginning of the seventeenth century, after having established the new See of Durango, to which all these lands were given. The Jesuits, who were assigned the task of converting to Christianity the people of these lands, founded the famous missions of Río Yaqui, Río Mayo, and Upper and Lower Pimeria. Notable among these priests was the celebrated Father Kino. When the Jesuits were expelled from all the Spanish colonies (1767) they had the following residences:

Missions of the Upper and Lower Pimeria
- Guazaves
- Aconche
- Mission San José de Mátape
- Oposura
- Santa Ana de Movas
- S. Ignacio
- Arizpe
- Aribechi
- Batuco
- Onavas
- Cucurupe
- Mission San Francisco Xavier de Cumuripa
- Saguaripa
- Mission Santa María Suamca
- Mission San Pedro y San Pablo del Tubutama
- Odope
- Sáric
- Tecoripa
- Ures
- Caborca
- Babispe
- Baca de Guachi
- Cuquiarachi
- Onapa
- Banamichi

Missions in the present-day United States

- S. Javier del Bac
- Santa Maria Basoraca
- Guebabi

Missions del Rio Yaqui

- Huiribis
- Mission Nuestra Señora de Belem
- Mission Nuestra Señora de la Asunción de Rahum
- Mission San Ignacio de Torin
- Bacum

Missions del Rio Mayo

- Mission Santa Cruz del Río Mayo
- Mission Santa Catarina de Camoa
- Nabojoa
- Mission San Andrés Conicari
- Batacosa

On 7 May 1779, Pius VI established the Diocese of Sonora to which belonged at that time the present states of Sinaloa and Sonora and the two Californias (Upper and Lower). It was suffragan of the then immense Archdiocese of Mexico. This territory was divided in 1840 when the See of San Francisco de California was founded. In 1863 it ceased to be a suffragan of Mexico and became suffragan of the new metropolitan see established at Guadalajara. In 1873 it was separated from Lower California, which became a vicariate Apostolic, and in 1883, when the See of Sinaloa was created, the See of Sonora was reduced to its present limits. In 1891 Leo XIII, by the Bull Illud in Primis, separated this See from the ecclesiastical Province of Guadalajara and made it a suffragan of the new Archdiocese of Durango. The bishop's residence was first situated in the city of Arizpe, but owing to the uprising of the Indians it was removed to Álamos and later to Culiacán, the present capital of the State of Sinaloa. When the new See of Sinaloa was created the Bishop of Sonora made his residence at Hermosillo. And in June 1959 more territory was lost from the Archdiocese of Hermosillo with the creation of the Diocese of Ciudad Obregón. Further, on Thursday, 19 March 2015, Pope Francis took territory from the Roman Catholic Archdiocese of Hermosillo to erect the new suffragan diocese of the Roman Catholic Diocese of Nogales, naming Auxiliary Bishop José Leopoldo González González of the Roman Catholic Archdiocese of Guadalajara, in Guadalajara, Mexico, as the first Bishop.

== Bishops ==
=== Bishops of Diocese of Sonora and of Diocese/Archdiocese of Hermosillo ===
- Bishop Antonio María de los Reyes Almada, O.F.M. (1780–1787)
- Bishop José Joaquín Granados y Gálvez, O.F.M. (1788–1794), appointed Bishop of Durango
- Bishop J. Damián Martínez de Galinsonga, O.F.M. (1794–1795), appointed Bishop of Tarazona, Spain
- Bishop Francisco Rousset de Jesús y Rosas, O.F.M. (1798–1814)
- Bishop Bernardo del Espíritu Santo Martínez y Ocejo, O.C.D. (1817–1825)
- Bishop Angel Mariano de Morales y Jasso (1832–1834)
- Bishop José Lázaro de la Garza y Ballesteros (1837–1850), appointed Archbishop of México, Federal District
- Bishop Pedro José de Jesús Loza y Pardavé (1852–1868), appointed Archbishop of Guadalajara, Jalisco
- Bishop Gil Alamán y García Castrillo (1868–1869)
- Bishop José de Jesús María Uriarte y Pérez (1869–1883), appointed Bishop of Sinaloa
- Bishop Jesús María Rico y Santoyo, O.F.M. (1883–1884)
- Bishop Herculano López de la Mora (1887–1902)
- Bishop Ignacio Valdespino y Díaz (1902–1913)
- Bishop Juan María Navarrete y Guerrero (1919–1968), raised to Archbishop in 1963
- Archbishop Carlos Quintero Arce (1968–1996)
- Archbishop José Ulises Macías Salcedo (1996–2016)
- Archbishop Ruy Rendon y Leal (2016–present)

=== Coadjutor archbishop ===
- Carlos Quintero Arce (1966–1968)

=== Auxiliary bishop ===
- Juan Francisco Escalante y Moreno (1855–1872)

=== Other priests of the diocese who became bishops ===
- Teodoro Enrique Pino Miranda, appointed Bishop of Huajuapan de León, Oaxaca in 2000
- Faustino Armendáriz Jiménez, appointed Bishop of Matamoros, Tamaulipas in 2005

== See also ==
- List of Roman Catholic archdioceses in México
