= Noelia Arroyo =

Spanish politician (born 1979)

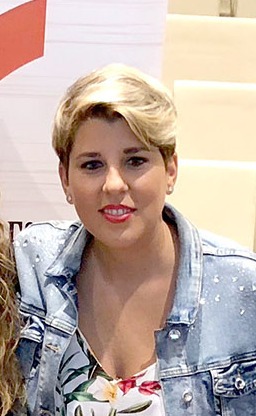
- Arroyo in 2022

Mayor of Cartagena
- Incumbent
- Assumed office 12 June 2021
- Preceded by: Ana Belén Castejón

Personal details
- Born: 14 June 1979 (age 47)
- Party: People's Party

Noelia María Arroyo Hernández (born 14 June 1979) is a Spanish politician serving as mayor of Cartagena since 2021. From 2017 to 2019, she served as minister of transparency and as government spokesperson of the Region of Murcia. From 2015 to 2017, she served as minister of culture and as government spokesperson.
