= Cartagena–Los Nietos line =

Railway in the Region of Murcia, Spain

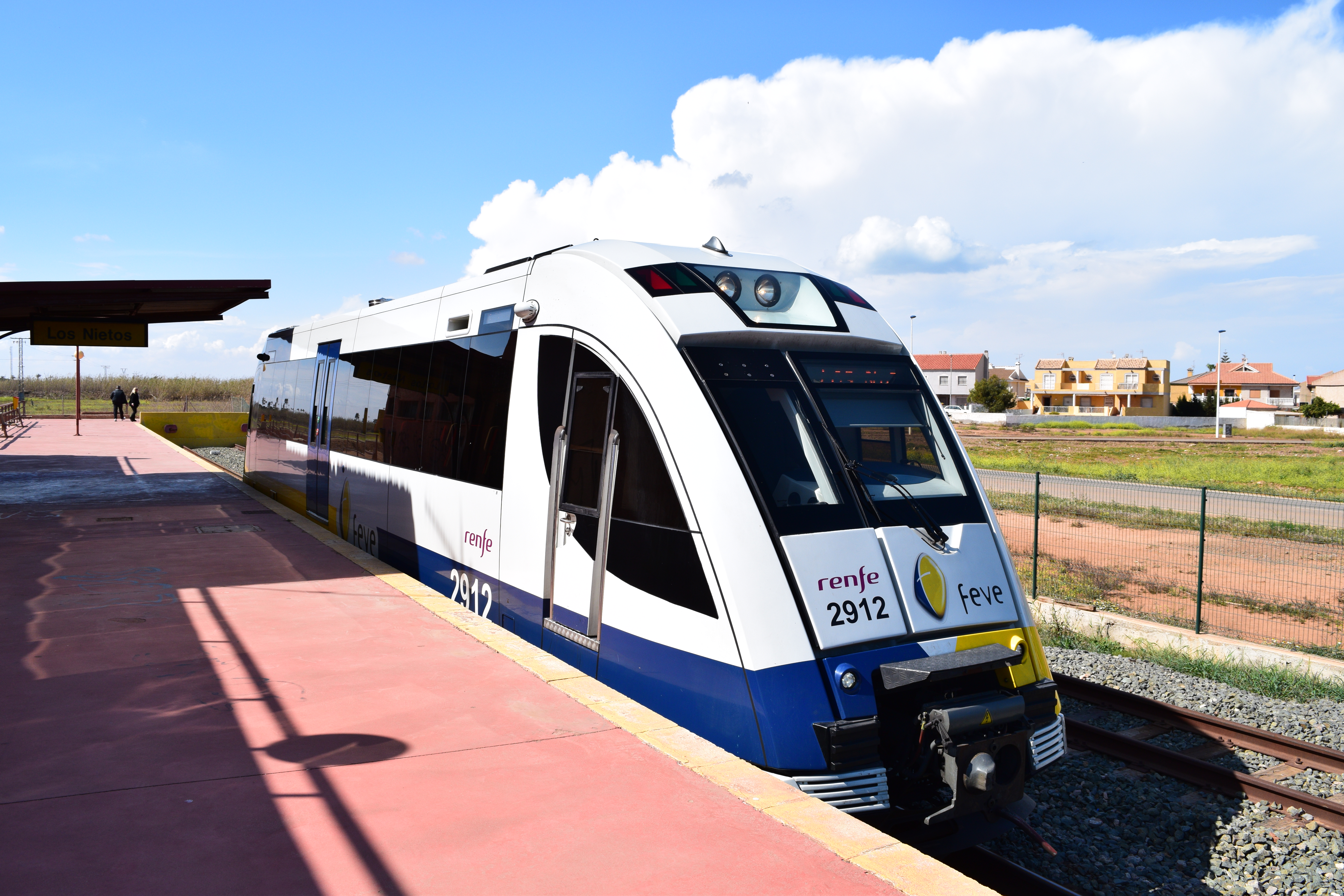
- Los Nietos Station.

Overview
- Owner: Adif
- Locale: Campo de Cartagena, Region of Murcia, Spain
- Termini: Cartagena; Los Nietos
- Stations: 15

Service
- Type: Commuter rail
- System: Cercanías Murcia/Alicante
- Operator(s): Renfe

History
- Opened: October 14, 1874

Technical
- Line length: 19.6 km (12.2 mi)
- Number of tracks: Single
- Track gauge: 1,000 mm (3 ft 3 3/8 in) metre gauge
- Electrification: No
- Operating speed: 80 km/h (50 mph)
Route map

The Cartagena–Los Nietos line is a narrow-gauge railway in the Murcia Region of Spain, connecting the city of Cartagena with smaller satellite towns to its east.

== History ==
The railway line was first developed in the late nineteenth century to serve the Sierra Minera de Cartagena-La Unión and associated mining communities east of Cartagena. The first section of the line completed in 1874 connected Cartagena with La Unión with a number of spur lines directly serving independent mines. In 1931 during the Second Republic period, the railway line was nationalized and in 1965 the operator was transferred to FEVE. The entire railway line, originally built at a 1,067 mm gauge, was switched to a metre gauge. In 1976 the railway was extended to its current terminus at Los Nietos.

== Service ==
Trains run between the Cartagena FEVE Station and Los Nietos Station every 30 minutes and they take approximately 28 minutes to traverse the entire route. The Cartagena FEVE station is approximately 250 m (820 ft) away from the main Cartagena railway station. There are 22 daily weekday services in each direction.

Proposals have been made to extend the line to the resort community of La Manga del Mar Menor but no funding has been committed.
