= Rincón de San Ginés =

- Municipality district
- Location in Spain Rincón de San Ginés (Spain)
- Coordinates: 37°37′18.5183″N 0°46′33.9746″W
- Country: Spain
- Autonomous community: Murcia
- Province: Province of Murcia
- Comarca: Campo de Cartagena
- Judicial district: Cartagena
- Municipality: Cartagena

Government
  - Mayor: Ana Belén Castejón Hernández

Area
  - Total: 59.334 km^{2} (22.909 sq mi)

Population (2020-01-01)
  - Total: 10,214
  - Density: 172.14/km^{2} (445.85/sq mi)
- Time zone: UTC+1 (CET)
  - Summer (DST): UTC+2 (CEST)
- Postal code: 30383 (north-west), 30385, 30370 (east)
- Dialing code: (+34) 968

Rincón de San Ginés is a district of the Spanish municipality Cartagena and is located in the south-east end. The territory is adjacent to the Mediterranean Sea in its south and east and is adjacent to a coastal salty lagoon named Mar Menor in its east. It has an area of 59,33 km^{2} and had a population of 10,558 in 2020. The Calblanque Regional Park occurs in this district. The Cabo de Palos lighthouse is located in the east end of the territory.

The following localities are included in the territory: Los Nietos Viejos, which is located in the north-west end and was inhabited by 198 people in 2020; Los Nietos, which is placed in the north-west and is home to 1,081 people; Los Belones, which is located in the north-west and had a population of 2,332; Islas Menores, which is placed in the north and was inhabited by 221 people; Playa Honda, which is located in the west of the northwestern quarter and was home to 1,145 people; Playa Paraíso, which occurs in the east and was inhabited by 449 people; Atamaría, which is located in the southwestern third and had a population of 427; Las Barracas, which occurs in the north-west of the south-western quarter and was inhabited by 181 people; Cobaticas, which is placed in the west of the south-eastern quarter and was home to 43 people, Cala Reona, which is located in the east and has a population of 727; and Cabo de Palos, which occurs in the east and was inhabited by 1,025 people.

== Demographics ==
21.519% inhabitants are foreigners – 15.35% come from other country of Europe, almost 2.51% are Africans, 2.235% are Americans and 1,4% are Asians. The table below shows the population trends during the 21st century by its five-year periods.

	2001	2006	2011	2016
Population	5,636	8,774	10,660	9,969
