= Los Nietos =

Fishing village in Spain

Coordinates: 37.6489°N 0.7835°W

Los Nietos is a town which is classed as a pedanía within the municipal territory of Cartagena that is subsequently in the autonomous community of the Region of Murcia in Spain.

It has its own individual marina on the Mar Menor, which began as a very small fishing settlement later being urbanised to allow more holiday homes by the Mar Menor. As of 2026 it’s a busy community with many visitors, especially during summertime, with local events at other times particularly at the Yacht Club on the marina. Many foreigners, mainly British, live there however post brexit the numbers of British have dwindled. Los Nietos is at the eastern terminus of the Cartagena–Los Nietos commuter railway line.

== Location ==
Located on the southwestern shore of the Mar Menor albufera, in the countryside to the north east of Cartagena. Los Nietos is 24 km from Cartagena. It has two beaches that are separated by the Yacht Club: to the east the beach La Lengua de Vaca & to the west La del Arenal.

== Climate ==
Los Nietos is classified as having a dry Mediterranean climate (according to Koppen Climate Classification), with mild temperatures in Winter and high temperatures in summer. The Thermometer can reach up to 38 °C in July-August and doesn’t tend to go below 5 °C in Winter as the yearly average is 16-18 °C.

== Human Geography ==
=== Demographics ===
In 2026 Los Nietos’s population was 2021 inhabitants according to Cartagena’s Town Hall. Out of the 2021 inhabitants the old village had 220 inhabitants whilst the main town had 1798

=== Public Services ===
- OMITA
- Félix Rodríguez de la Fuente School for Children 0-12 years
- Pharmacy
- Yacht Club that has a marina and has a restaurant in it. The restaurant can be used by non members
- Church dedicated to Our Lady of the Angels
- Tapas Bars
- Antonio’s Restaurant

== History ==
=== Antiquity ===
In Antiquity the coastal bar of the Mar Menor -La Manga- hadn’t completely closed up passage to the Mar Menor, which allowed for it to be navigable during the periods of the Greek, Phoenician, and Roman settlements.

== Economy ==
Traditionally its economy has been based around fishing in the Mar Menor (currently not anymore), in agriculture, en the service sectors, mainly in activities relating to tourism.

== Geology ==
=== Streams ===
The Ponce and la Carrasquilla, are streams located further to the south of Los Nietos, with short distances of no more than 7 kilometres from EL Llano del Beal and Atamaría,respectively. The Carrasquilla stream drains into the Mar Menor at the lengua de la vaca.
