= 4th federal electoral district of Sonora =

Federal electoral district of Mexico

Sonora's 4th
- Electoral district of the Chamber of Deputies of Mexico

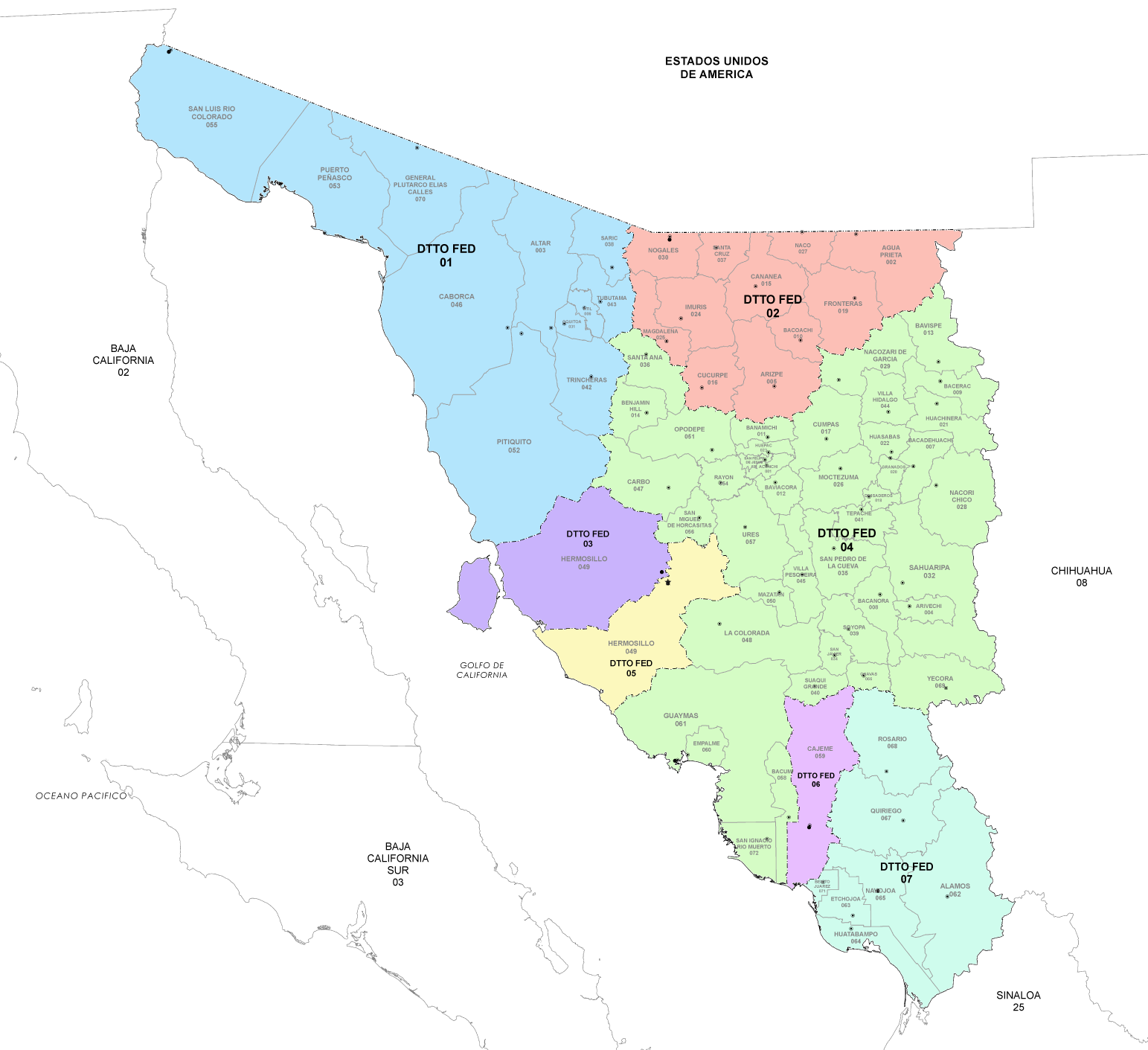
- 4th district since 2017

Incumbent
- Member: Ramón Ángel Flores Robles
- Party: ▌Labour Party
- Congress: 66th (2024–2027)

District
- State: Sonora
- Head town: Guaymas
- Coordinates: 27°55′N 110°53′W
- Covers: 41 municipalities: Aconchi, Arivechi, Bacadéhuachi, Bacanora, Bacerac, Bácum, Banámichi, Baviácora, Bavispe, Benjamín Hill, Carbó, Cumpas, Divisaderos, Empalme, Granados, Guaymas, Huachinera, Huasabas, Huépac, La Colorada, Mazatán, Moctezuma, Nacori Chico, Nacozari de García, Onavas, Opodepe, Rayón, Sahuaripa, San Felipe de Jesús, San Ignacio Río Muerto, San Javier, San Miguel de Horcasitas, San Pedro de la Cueva, Santa Ana, Soyopa, Suaqui Grande, Tepache, Ures, Villa Hidalgo, Villa Pesqueira, Yécora
- PR region: First
- Precincts: 278
- Population: 361,610 (2020 census)

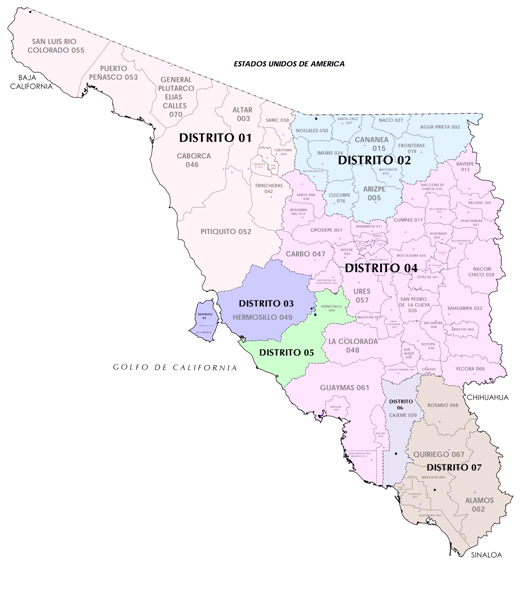
Sonora under the 2017–2022 districting plan

The 4th federal electoral district of Sonora (Spanish: Distrito electoral federal 04 de Sonora) is one of the 300 electoral districts into which Mexico is divided for elections to the federal Chamber of Deputies and one of seven such districts in the state of Sonora.

It elects one deputy to the lower house of Congress for each three-year legislative session by means of the first-past-the-post system. Votes cast in the district also count towards the calculation of proportional representation ("plurinominal") deputies elected from the first region.

The current member for the district, elected in the 2024 general election, is Ramón Ángel Flores Robles. Originally elected for the National Regeneration Movement (Morena), he switched to the Labour Party on 19 September 2024.

== District territory ==
Under the 2023 districting plan adopted by the National Electoral Institute (INE), which is to be used for the 2024, 2027 and 2030 federal elections, Sonora's 4th district comprises 278 electoral precincts (secciones electorales) across 41 municipalities in the central and eastern parts of the state:

- Aconchi, Arivechi, Bacadéhuachi, Bacanora, Bacerac, Bácum, Banámichi, Baviácora, Bavispe, Benjamín Hill, Carbó, Cumpas, Divisaderos, Empalme, Granados, Guaymas, Huachinera, Huasabas, Huépac, La Colorada, Mazatán, Moctezuma, Nacori Chico, Nacozari de García, Onavas, Opodepe, Rayón, Sahuaripa, San Felipe de Jesús, San Ignacio Río Muerto, San Javier, San Miguel de Horcasitas, San Pedro de la Cueva, Santa Ana, Soyopa, Suaqui Grande, Tepache, Ures, Villa Hidalgo, Villa Pesqueira and Yécora.

The head town (cabecera distrital), where results from individual polling stations are gathered together and tallied, is the port city of Guaymas. The district reported a population of 361,610 in the 2020 census.

== Previous districting schemes ==
Evolution of electoral district numbers
	1974	1978	1996	2005	2017	2023
Sonora	4	7	7	7	7	7
Chamber of Deputies	196	300				

2017–2022

Between 2017 and 2022, the district had the same configuration as at present.

2005–2017

Under the 2005 plan, the district's head town was at Guaymas and it covered 39 municipalities.

1996–2005

Under the 1996 districting plan, the head town was at Guaymas and the district covered 16 municipalities.

1978–1996

The districting scheme in force from 1978 to 1996 was the result of the 1977 electoral reforms, which increased the number of single-member seats in the Chamber of Deputies from 196 to 300. Under that plan, Sonora's seat allocation rose from four to seven. The 4th district had its head town at Navojoa and it covered the municipalities of Etchojoa, Huatabampo and Navojoa.

== Deputies returned to Congress ==
(Mexico) National parties
- Current
- PAN
- PRI
- PT
- PVEM
- MC
- Morena
- PAZ
- Somos
- Defunct or local only
- PLM
- PNR
- PRM
- PNM
- PP
- PPS
- PARM
- PFCRN
- CON
- PANAL
- PSD
- PES
- PES
- PRD

Sonora's 4th district
Election	Deputy	Party	Term	Legislature
1979	Rubén Duarte Corral	Institutional Revolutionary Party	1979–1982	51st Congress
1982	Manlio Fabio Beltrones	Institutional Revolutionary Party	1982–1985	52nd Congress
1985	Bulmaro Pacheco Moreno	Institutional Revolutionary Party	1985–1988	53rd Congress
1988	Juan Manuel Verongo Rosas	Institutional Revolutionary Party	1988–1991	54th Congress
1991	Arsenio Duarte Murrieta	Institutional Revolutionary Party	1991–1994	55th Congress
1994	Francisco Javier Hernández Armenta	Institutional Revolutionary Party	1994–1997	56th Congress
1997	José Ignacio Martínez Tadeo	Institutional Revolutionary Party	1997–2000	57th Congress
2000	Julián Luzanilla Contreras	Institutional Revolutionary Party	2000–2003	58th Congress
2003	Antonio Astiazarán Gutiérrez	Institutional Revolutionary Party	2003–2006	59th Congress
2006	Carlos Zatarain González	Institutional Revolutionary Party	2006–2009	60th Congress
2009	José Luis Marcos León Perea	Institutional Revolutionary Party	2009–2012	61st Congress
2012	Antonio Astiazarán Gutiérrez	Institutional Revolutionary Party	2012–2015	62nd Congress
2015	Susana Corella Platt	Institutional Revolutionary Party	2015–2018	63rd Congress
2018	Heriberto Marcelo Aguilar Castillo	National Regeneration Movement	2018–2021	64th Congress
2021	Heriberto Marcelo Aguilar Castillo	National Regeneration Movement	2021–2024	65th Congress
2024	Ramón Ángel Flores Robles (Note: Originally elected for Morena, Flores Robles switched to the PT on 19 September 2024.)	National Regeneration Movement Labour Party (Mexico)	2024–2027	66th Congress

== Presidential elections ==
Sonora's 4th district
Election	District won by	Party or coalition	%
2018	Andrés Manuel López Obrador	Juntos Haremos Historia	57.6835
2024	Claudia Sheinbaum Pardo	Sigamos Haciendo Historia	65.8484
