= Telemax (TV network) =

Public TV network of the Mexican state of Sonora

- Country: Mexico (State of Sonora)

Programming
- Picture format: HDTV 1080i

Ownership
- Owner: Televisora de Hermosillo (Government of the State of Sonora)

History
- Launched: 1959

Links
- Website: www.telemax.com.mx

Availability

Terrestrial
- Digital terrestrial television (Sonora): Channel 15

Telemax is a Mexican broadcast television network based in Hermosillo, Sonora. Its flagship station is XEWH-TDT in Hermosillo, and is available nationally through satellite and cable coverage. It is also available through a network of over-the-air repeaters, which extend its flagship station's coverage throughout Sonora. Telemax is owned by the State of Sonora and its stated mission is "to promote Sonoran culture and values, the works and programs of the government, and timely and truthful broadcast of information to various social segments of the population."

== History ==
=== XEWH history ===
The history of television station XEWH precedes that of Telemax by over 30 years. Founded November 27, 1957 by the Azcárraga family, XEWH went on the air May 30, 1959 as part of Telesistema Mexicano, hence the callsign XEWH, from "XEW", the Telesistema Mexicano flagship station in Mexico City, and "H", for Hermosillo. As typical of Telesistema Mexicano stations, XEWH operated independently, but that changed in 1969. The station became a mere retransmitter of programs from Mexico City, likely from XEW-TV, and remained so until 1978, when it was acquired by local businessmen and broke away to resume producing local programming. In 1984, the station was sold to the Sonoran government. State government decree 369 on August 22, 1985, established XEWH as the official voice of the Sonoran government. Also in 1985, the government began building a network of low-power television stations throughout Sonora to rebroadcast XEWH.

XEWH is one of the few public television stations in Mexico to operate under a commercial concession. Its transmitter is located on Cerro La Cementera in Hermosillo along with those for Hermosillo's other television stations.

In March 2018, in order to facilitate the repacking of TV services out of the 600 MHz band (channels 38-51), XEWH was assigned channel 19 for continued digital operations.

=== Telemax history ===
The year 1990 saw the launch of Telemax, a new identity for the state-run television station. The initial construction of the statewide network was coming to a close, but as Telemax, the number of stations in the network increased rapidly. Seven stations were added in 1996, and 26 more were added in 1997, bringing the number of stations to 58.

In 2015, Telemax changed its format radically to offer half-hour newscasts at the top of the hour on weekdays, as well as educational programming on weekends. The network relaunch included a new logo and slogan, #TuVozSeEscucha (Your Voice is Heard), as well as an emphasis on social media interaction. On September 8, 2015, Telemax went HD and launched 17 HD transmitters.

== Programming ==
On weekdays Telemax's programming is heavy on news programming. The station's live shows begin at 6:30am with the morning program Despierta Sonora and for most of the day mix the half-hour newscasts (and some hour-long shows, at 2 and 8pm) with other shows focusing on topics including health and sports.

On the weekends Telemax produces no newscasts and carries large quantities of national educational programming, as well as some of its own productions like Conociendo Sonora and a Sunday Mass.

== Transmitters ==
The following television transmitters, all owned by the Government of the State of Sonora, broadcast Telemax programming.

RF	VC	Call sign	Location	ERP
14	15	XHADO-TDT	Adivino	.036 kW
22	15	XHAPS-TDT	Agua Prieta	2.5 kW
22	15	XHALM-TDT	Álamos	.15 kW
22	15	XHACH-TDT	Arivechi	.267 kW
14	15	XHAZP-TDT	Arizpe	.13 kW
14	15	XHALS-TDT	Atil	
14	15	XHBNI-TDT	Bacadehuachi	
14	15	XHBCA-TDT	Bacanora	.023 kW
16	15	XHBAC-TDT	Bacerac	
14	15	XHBCI-TDT	Bacoachi	
30	15	XHBAS-TDT	Banamichi	
14	15	XHBVA-TDT	Baviacora	0.7 kW
14	15	XHBVE-TDT	Bavispe	.3 kW
14	15	XHBNL-TDT	Benjamin Hill	
36	15	XHCAS-TDT	Caborca	2.5 kW
14	15	XHCPCA-TDT	Cananea	
15	15	XHCRO-TDT	Carbó	
20	15	XHCPBY-TDT	Ciudad Obregón	
14	15	XHRPS-TDT	Cucurpe	
34	15	XHCPS-TDT	Cumpas	
16	15	XHDVS-TDT	Divisaderos	
19	15	XHFAS-TDT	Fronteras	
28	15	XHGDS-TDT	Granados	
18	15	XHSGU-TDT	Guaymas	5 kW
19	15	XEWH-TDT	Hermosillo	40 kW
14	15	XHHCH-TDT	Huachinera	
18	15	XHHAS-TDT	Huasabas	
19	15	XHIMS-TDT	Imuris	.05 kW
14	15	XHMDS-TDT	Magdalena de Kino	.05 kW
34	15	XHMZN-TDT	Mazatan	
31	15	XHMOS-TDT	Moctezuma	0.7 kW
33	15	XHNAC-TDT	Naco	.036 kW
14	15	XHNCO-TDT	Nácori Chico	
14	15	XHNGE-TDT	Nácori Grande	
22	15	XHNCZ-TDT	Nacozari	1 kW
14	15	XHONV-TDT	Onavas	
15	15	XHOQT-TDT	Oquitoa	
20	15	XHCPCZ-TDT	Puerto Peñasco	
16	15	XHQBI-TDT	Querobabi	.05 kW
15	15	XHRON-TDT	Rayon	
35	15	XHRSO-TDT	Rosario	.2 kW
20	15	XHSPA-TDT	Sahuaripa	1 kW
18	15	XHSFS-TDT	San Felipe de Jesús	
14	15	XHSJR-TDT	San Javier	
30	15	XHRCS-TDT	San Luis Río Colorado	10.2 kW
14	15	XHSPE-TDT	San Pedro de la Cueva	
15	15	XHSAS-TDT	Santa Ana	
14	15	XHSCZ-TDT	Santa Cruz	
14	15	XHSIC-TDT	Sáric	
14	15	XHSSE-TDT	Sásabe	
17	15	XHSQP-TDT	Sinoquipe	
14	15	XHSYT-TDT	Sonoyta	
35	15	XHSYO-TDT	Soyopa	
34	15	XHSGE-TDT	Suaqui Grande	
14	15	XHTCE-TDT	Tepache	
14	15	XHUES-TDT	Ures	1.9 kW
14	15	XHVHO-TDT	Villa Hidalgo	
31	15	XHVPA-TDT	Villa Pesqueira	
17	15	XHCPCC-TDT	Yécora	

== Coverage in the United States ==
Telemax programming also airs on a few low-power stations in the United States:

- KUDF-LD 14.2, Tucson, Arizona
- KDVD-LD 50.2, Phoenix, Arizona
- KRMF-LD 7.5, Reno, Nevada
- WEQT-LD 9.3, Atlanta, Georgia
- WMMF-LD 19.13, Vero Beach, Florida

Telemax was formerly carried on KPHE-LD 44.2, Phoenix, Arizona, until that station was sold in May 2022. In mid 2022, Telemax has ceased broadcasting on KHMP-LD 18.5, Las Vegas, being replaced by another network.
