= Municipalities of Sonora =

List of municipalities of Mexican state

Map of Mexico with Sonora highlighted

Sonora is a state in northwestern Mexico that is divided into 72 municipalities. According to the 2020 INEGI census, it is the eighteenth most populated state with 2,944,840 inhabitants and the 2nd largest by land area, spanning 179,354.7 square kilometres (69,249.2 sq mi).

Municipalities in Sonora are administratively autonomous of the state according to the 115th article of the 1917 Constitution of Mexico. Every three years, citizens elect a municipal president (Spanish: presidente municipal) by a plurality voting system who heads a concurrently elected municipal council (ayuntamiento) responsible for providing all the public services for their constituents. The municipal council consists of a variable number of trustees and councillors (regidores y síndicos). Municipalities are responsible for public services (such as water and sewerage), street lighting, public safety, traffic, and the maintenance of public parks, gardens and cemeteries. They may also assist the state and federal governments in education; emergency fire and medical services; environmental protection; and maintenance of monuments and historical landmarks. Since 1984, they have had the power to collect property taxes and user fees, although more funds are obtained from the state and federal governments than from their own income.

The largest municipality by population is Hermosillo, with 936,263 residents (31.79% of the state's total), while the smallest is Ónavas, with 365 residents. The largest municipality by land area is also Hermosillo, which spans 15,724.30 km^{2} (6,071.19 sq mi), and the smallest is San Felipe de Jesús, with 151.30 km^{2} (58.42 sq mi). In December 1930, the Congress of Sonora enacted Law Number 68, which included a municipal reorganization that dissolved a majority of the state's local municipalities to centralize administrative control. Over the course of the 1930s and beyond many of the municipalities regained their local administration through laws such as the Organic Municipal Administration Law of 1932. The newest municipalities are Benito Juárez and San Ignacio Río Muerto, established in 1996.

== Municipalities ==
Largest municipalities in Sonora by population

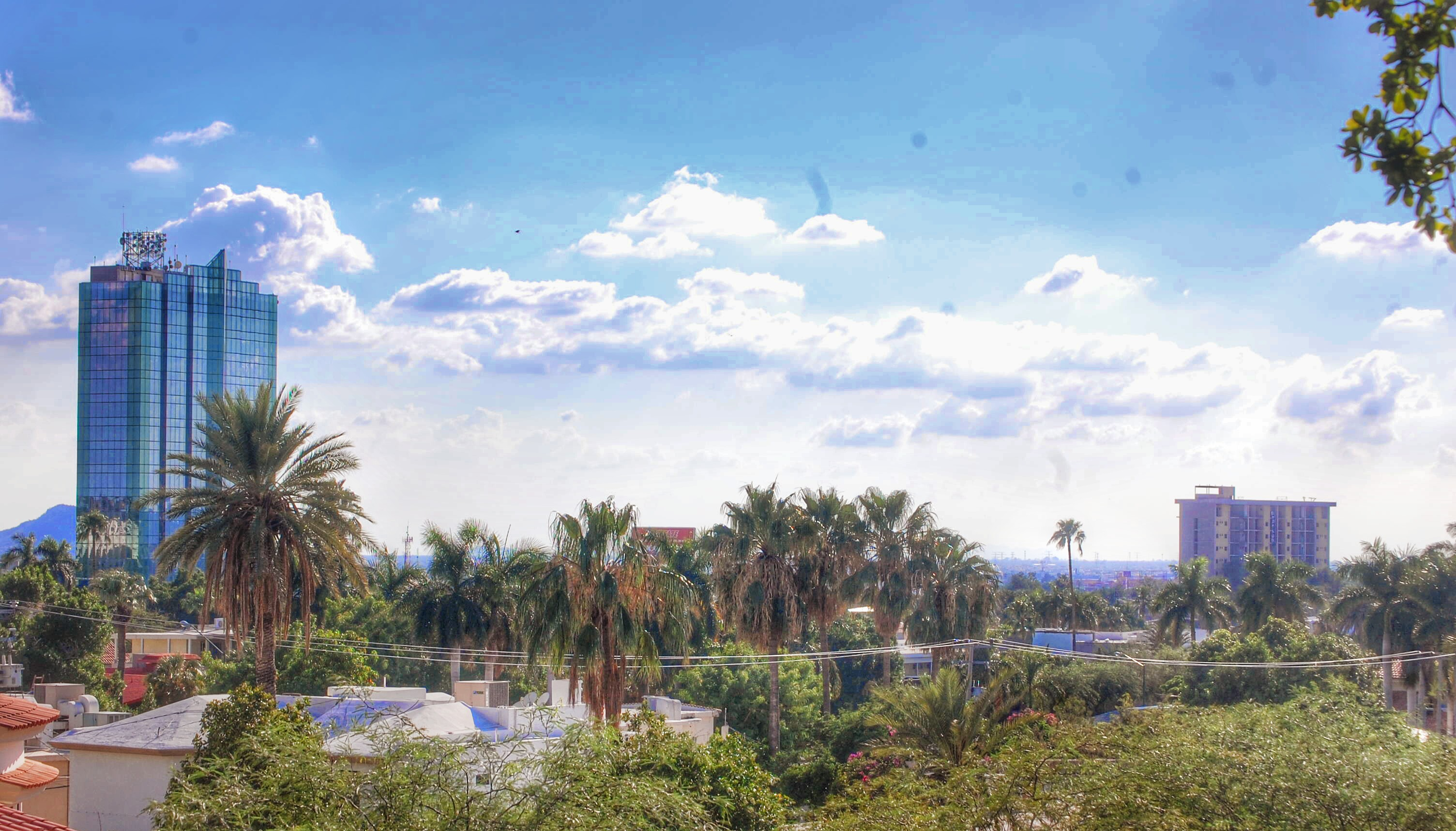
Hermosillo, capital and largest municipality by population in Sonora

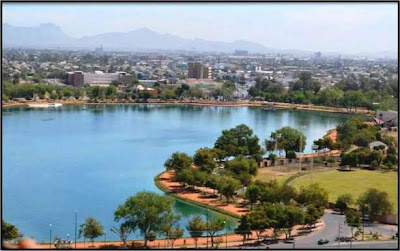
Cajeme is the second largest municipality by population in Sonora.

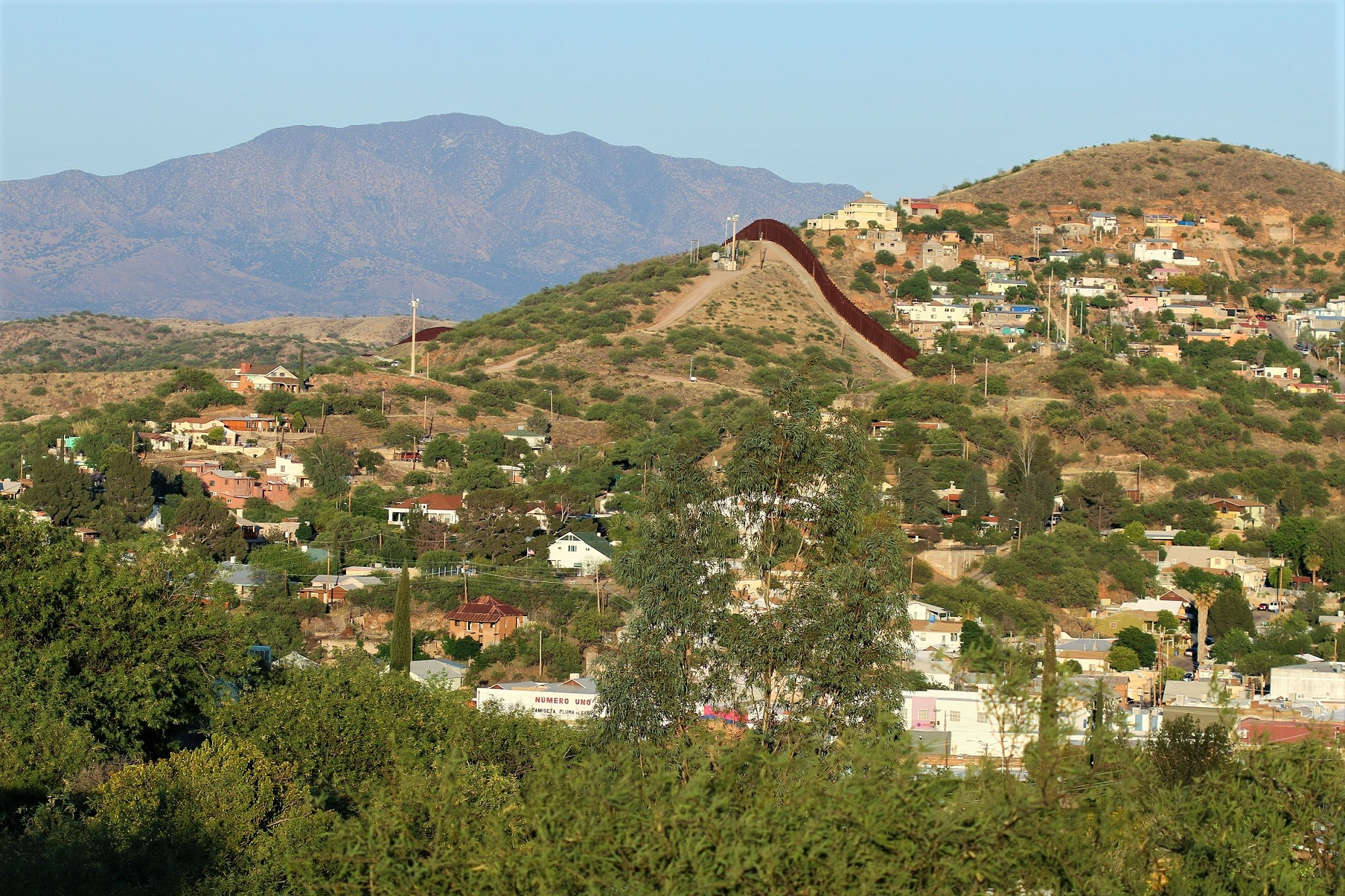
Nogales, third largest municipality by population in Sonora
† State capital

Municipalities of Sonora
Name	Municipal seat	Population (2020)	Population (2010)	Change	Land area		Population density (2020)	Incorporation date
Name	Municipal seat	Population (2020)	Population (2010)	Change	km^{2}	sq mi	Population density (2020)	Incorporation date
Aconchi (Note: Aconchi was merged with Arizpe from 1837 to 1862 and again from 1930 to 1932.)	Aconchi	2,563	2,637	−2.8%	368.2	142.2	7.0/km^{2} (18.0/sq mi)	December 26, 1829
Agua Prieta	Agua Prieta	91,929	79,138	+16.2%	3,946.5	1,523.8	23.3/km^{2} (60.3/sq mi)	August 28, 1916
Álamos	Álamos	24,976	25,848	−3.4%	6,422.8	2,479.9	3.9/km^{2} (10.1/sq mi)	January 19, 1825
Altar (Note: Altar was named Villa Figueroa from 1828 to 1837.)	Altar	9,492	9,049	+4.9%	4,457.7	1,721.1	2.1/km^{2} (5.5/sq mi)	November 2, 1825
Arivechi	Arivechi	1,177	1,253	−6.1%	726.3	280.4	1.6/km^{2} (4.2/sq mi)	December 3, 1862
Arizpe	Arizpe	2,788	3,037	−8.2%	3,072.0	1,186.1	0.9/km^{2} (2.4/sq mi)	November 2, 1825
Átil	Átil	626	625	+0.2%	300.4	116.0	2.1/km^{2} (5.4/sq mi)	December 3, 1862
Bacadéhuachi (Note: Bacadéhuachi was merged with Bacerac from 1930 to 1931.)	Bacadéhuachi	979	1,252	−21.8%	1,066.0	411.6	0.9/km^{2} (2.4/sq mi)	December 3, 1862
Bacanora (Note: Bacanora was merged with Sahuaripa from 1930 to 1932.)	Bacanora	759	784	−3.2%	1,128.9	435.9	0.7/km^{2} (1.7/sq mi)	December 3, 1862
Bacerac	Bacerac	1,221	1,467	−16.8%	1,344.6	519.2	0.9/km^{2} (2.4/sq mi)	December 3, 1862
Bacoachi	Bacoachi	1,475	1,646	−10.4%	1,231.0	475.3	1.2/km^{2} (3.1/sq mi)	December 3, 1862
Bácum (Note: Bacum was merged with Cajeme from 1930 to 1931.)	Bácum	23,151	22,821	+1.4%	1,583.3	611.3	14.6/km^{2} (37.9/sq mi)	August 31, 1911
Banámichi (Note: Banámichi was merged with Arizpe from 1930 to 1931.)	Banámichi	1,825	1,646	+10.9%	808.1	312.0	2.3/km^{2} (5.8/sq mi)	December 26, 1829
Baviácora (Note: Baviácora was merged with Arizpe from 1930 to 1931.)	Baviácora	3,191	3,560	−10.4%	842.5	325.3	3.8/km^{2} (9.8/sq mi)	December 26, 1829
Bavispe (Note: Bavispe was merged with Bacerac from 1930 to 1931.)	Bavispe	1,169	1,454	−19.6%	1,721.7	664.8	0.7/km^{2} (1.8/sq mi)	December 3, 1862
Benito Juárez	Villa Juárez	21,692	22,009	−1.4%	369.5	142.7	58.7/km^{2} (152.0/sq mi)	December 26, 1996
Benjamín Hill	Benjamín Hill	4,988	5,275	−5.4%	1,412.2	545.3	3.5/km^{2} (9.1/sq mi)	April 19, 1952
Caborca	Caborca	89,122	81,309	+9.6%	10,671.7	4,120.4	8.4/km^{2} (21.6/sq mi)	December 3, 1862
Cajeme	Ciudad Obregón	436,484	409,310	+6.6%	4,876.3	1,882.7	89.5/km^{2} (231.8/sq mi)	November 30, 1927
Cananea	Cananea	39,451	32,936	+19.8%	2,316.2	894.3	17.0/km^{2} (44.1/sq mi)	November 1, 1907
Carbó (Note: Carbó was merged with San Miguel de Horcasitas from 1943 to 1953.)	Carbó	4,946	5,347	−7.5%	2,581.8	996.8	1.9/km^{2} (5.0/sq mi)	July 3, 1943
Cucurpe (Note: Cucurpe was merged with Magdalena from 1930 to 1932.)	Cucurpe	863	958	−9.9%	1,577.9	609.2	0.5/km^{2} (1.4/sq mi)	December 3, 1862
Cumpas	Cumpas	5,829	6,362	−8.4%	2,010.0	776.1	2.9/km^{2} (7.5/sq mi)	December 3, 1862
Divisaderos	Divisaderos	753	813	−7.4%	385.7	148.9	2.0/km^{2} (5.1/sq mi)	April 23, 1932
Empalme (Note: Empalme was merged with Guaymas from 1940 to 1953.)	Empalme	51,431	54,131	−5.0%	593.2	229.0	86.7/km^{2} (224.6/sq mi)	May 8, 1937
Etchojoa	Etchojoa	61,309	60,717	+1.0%	948.6	366.3	64.6/km^{2} (167.4/sq mi)	October 15, 1909
Fronteras (Note: Fronteras was merged with Agua Prieta from 1930 to 1931.)	Fronteras	9,041	8,639	+4.7%	2,616.4	1,010.2	3.5/km^{2} (8.9/sq mi)	December 3, 1862
Granados (Note: Granados was merged with Cumpas from 1930 to 1932.)	Granados	1,009	1,150	−12.3%	363.9	140.5	2.8/km^{2} (7.2/sq mi)	December 3, 1862
Guaymas (Note: Guaymas was originally incorporated as Villa de Salvación, changing its name on May 13, 1848.)	Guaymas	156,863	149,299	+5.1%	7,945.6	3,067.8	19.7/km^{2} (51.1/sq mi)	February 28, 1845
Hermosillo (Note: Hermosillo was originally incorporated as Pitic, changing its name on September 5, 1828.)	Hermosillo†	936,263	784,342	+19.4%	15,724.3	6,071.2	59.5/km^{2} (154.2/sq mi)	February 28, 1845
Huachinera (Note: Huachinera was merged with Bacerac from 1930 to 1952.)	Huachinera	1,186	1,350	−12.1%	1,197.6	462.4	1.0/km^{2} (2.6/sq mi)	December 15, 1921
Huásabas (Note: Huásabas was merged with Cumpas from 1930 to 1932.)	Huásabas	888	962	−7.7%	821.7	317.3	1.1/km^{2} (2.8/sq mi)	December 3, 1862
Huatabampo	Huatabampo	77,682	79,313	−2.1%	1,905.5	735.7	40.8/km^{2} (105.6/sq mi)	December 12, 1898
Huépac (Note: Huépac was merged with Arizpe from 1930 to 1931.)	Huépac	943	1,154	−18.3%	420.8	162.5	2.2/km^{2} (5.8/sq mi)	December 3, 1862
Ímuris (Note: Ímuris was merged with Magdalena from 1930 to 1931.)	Ímuris	12,536	12,316	+1.8%	2,170.0	837.8	5.8/km^{2} (15.0/sq mi)	December 3, 1862
La Colorada (Note: La Colorada was originally incorporated as Mineral de las Prietas, changing its name on December 7, 1903. It was merged with Hermosillo from 1930 to 1934.)	La Colorada	1,848	1,663	+11.1%	4,122.1	1,591.6	0.4/km^{2} (1.2/sq mi)	June 26, 1889
Magdalena	Magdalena de Kino	33,049	29,707	+11.2%	1,239.4	478.5	26.7/km^{2} (69.1/sq mi)	December 3, 1862
Mazatán (Note: Mazatán was merged with Ures from 1930 to 1934.)	Mazatán	1,101	1,350	−18.4%	683.0	263.7	1.6/km^{2} (4.2/sq mi)	December 16, 1907
Moctezuma (Note: Moctezuma was originally incorporated as Oposura, changing its name on September 9, 1828.)	Moctezuma	5,173	4,680	+10.5%	1,877.5	724.9	2.8/km^{2} (7.1/sq mi)	November 2, 1825
Naco	Naco	5,774	6,401	−9.8%	1,238.4	478.1	4.7/km^{2} (12.1/sq mi)	June 30, 1937
Nácori Chico (Note: Nácori Chico was merged with Bacerac from 1930 to 1934.)	Nácori Chico	1,531	2,051	−25.4%	2,832.7	1,093.7	0.5/km^{2} (1.4/sq mi)	February 21, 1917
Nacozari	Nacozari de García	14,369	12,751	+12.7%	1,735.8	670.2	8.3/km^{2} (21.4/sq mi)	October 15, 1912
Navojoa	Navojoa	164,387	157,729	+4.2%	2,808.7	1,084.4	58.5/km^{2} (151.6/sq mi)	December 3, 1862
Nogales	Nogales	264,782	220,292	+20.2%	1,756.6	678.2	150.7/km^{2} (390.4/sq mi)	July 11, 1884
Ónavas (Note: Ónavas was merged with Soyopa from 1903 to 1907 and with Ures from 1930 to 1935.)	Ónavas	365	399	−8.5%	534.2	206.3	0.7/km^{2} (1.8/sq mi)	December 3, 1862
Opodepe (Note: Opodepe was merged with Rayón from 1930 to 1933.)	Opodepe	2,438	2,878	−15.3%	2,224.3	858.8	1.1/km^{2} (2.8/sq mi)	December 3, 1862
Oquitoa (Note: Oquitoa was merged with Altar from 1930 to 1934.)	Oquitoa	496	443	+12.0%	916.4	353.8	0.5/km^{2} (1.4/sq mi)	December 3, 1862
Pitiquito	Pitiquito	9,122	9,468	−3.7%	9,820.0	3,791.5	0.9/km^{2} (2.4/sq mi)	December 3, 1862
Puerto Peñasco	Puerto Peñasco	62,689	57,342	+9.3%	6,193.3	2,391.2	10.1/km^{2} (26.2/sq mi)	July 7, 1952
Plutarco Elías Calles	Sonoyta	13,627	15,625	−12.8%	3,656.7	1,411.9	3.7/km^{2} (9.7/sq mi)	August 21, 1989
Quiriego (Note: Quiriego was merged with Rosario from 1930 to 1932.)	Quiriego	3,090	3,356	−7.9%	3,780.6	1,459.7	0.8/km^{2} (2.1/sq mi)	December 3, 1862
Rayón (Note: Rayón was originally incorporated as Nacameri, changing its name on April 8, 1850.)	Rayón	1,496	1,599	−6.4%	879.1	339.4	1.7/km^{2} (4.4/sq mi)	February 17, 1828
Rosario	Rosario de Tesopaco	4,830	5,226	−7.6%	3,519.8	1,359.0	1.4/km^{2} (3.6/sq mi)	November 2, 1825
Sahuaripa (Note: Sahuaripa was originally incorporated as Ostimuri, changing its name on March 20, 1837.)	Sahuaripa	5,257	6,020	−12.7%	5,003.8	1,932.0	1.1/km^{2} (2.7/sq mi)	November 2, 1825
San Felipe de Jesús (Note: San Felipe de Jesús was merged with Arizpe from 1930 to 1932.)	San Felipe de Jesús	369	396	−6.8%	151.3	58.4	2.4/km^{2} (6.3/sq mi)	December 3, 1862
San Ignacio Río Muerto	San Ignacio Río Muerto	14,279	14,136	+1.0%	1,383.6	534.2	10.3/km^{2} (26.7/sq mi)	December 26, 1996
San Javier (Note: San Javier was merged with Hermosillo from 1930 to 1934.)	San Javier	537	492	+9.1%	535.9	206.9	1.0/km^{2} (2.6/sq mi)	December 3, 1862
San Luis Río Colorado	San Luis Río Colorado	199,021	178,380	+11.6%	8,860.0	3,420.9	22.5/km^{2} (58.2/sq mi)	July 1, 1939
San Miguel de Horcasitas (Note: San Miguel de Horcasitas was merged with Ures from 1930 to 1934.)	San Miguel de Horcasitas	10,729	8,382	+28.0%	1,115.6	430.7	9.6/km^{2} (24.9/sq mi)	March 20, 1837
San Pedro de la Cueva (Note: San Pedro de la Cueva was merged with Batuc from 1930 to 1932.)	San Pedro de la Cueva	1,458	1,604	−9.1%	2,229.5	860.8	0.7/km^{2} (1.7/sq mi)	May 14, 1864
Santa Ana	Santa Ana	16,203	16,014	+1.2%	1,476.6	570.1	11.0/km^{2} (28.4/sq mi)	December 3, 1862
Santa Cruz (Note: Santa Cruz was merged with Nogales from 1930 to 1931.)	Santa Cruz	1,835	1,998	−8.2%	1,001.2	386.6	1.8/km^{2} (4.7/sq mi)	December 3, 1862
Sáric (Note: Sáric was merged with Altar from 1930 to 1934.)	Sáric	2,058	2,703	−23.9%	1,353.6	522.6	1.5/km^{2} (3.9/sq mi)	December 3, 1862
Soyopa (Note: Soyopa was merged with Ures from 1930 to 1935.)	Soyopa	1,368	1,284	+6.5%	1,716.8	662.9	0.8/km^{2} (2.1/sq mi)	December 3, 1862
Suaqui Grande (Note: Suaqui Grande was merged with Hermosillo from 1930 to 1935.)	Suaqui Grande	1,114	1,121	−0.6%	914.8	353.2	1.2/km^{2} (3.2/sq mi)	December 3, 1862
Tepache (Note: Tepache was merged with Moctezuma from 1930 to 1932.)	Tepache	1,178	1,365	−13.7%	778.7	300.7	1.5/km^{2} (3.9/sq mi)	December 3, 1862
Trincheras (Note: Trincheras was merged with Pitiquito from 1930 to 1934.)	Trincheras	1,381	1,731	−20.2%	3,010.4	1,162.3	0.5/km^{2} (1.2/sq mi)	April 28, 1916
Tubutama (Note: Tubutama was merged with Sáric in 1903 to 1908 and with Altar from 1930 to 1934.)	Tubutama	1,473	1,735	−15.1%	1,725.4	666.2	0.9/km^{2} (2.2/sq mi)	December 3, 1862
Ures	Ures	8,548	9,185	−6.9%	3,088.1	1,192.3	2.8/km^{2} (7.2/sq mi)	May 13, 1848
Villa Hidalgo (Note: Villa Hidalgo was originally incorporated as Oputo, changing its name on April 15, 1967.)	Villa Hidalgo	1,429	1,738	−17.8%	1,471.5	568.1	1.0/km^{2} (2.5/sq mi)	December 11, 1874
Villa Pesqueira (Note: Villa Pesqueira was originally incorporated as Mápate, changing its name on June 30, 1934. Merged with Ures from 1930 to 1934.)	Villa Pesqueira	1,043	1,254	−16.8%	1,123.2	433.7	0.9/km^{2} (2.4/sq mi)	May 6, 1852
Yécora (Note: Yécora was merged with Ures from 1930 to 1935.)	Yécora	4,793	6,046	−20.7%	2,667.7	1,030.0	1.8/km^{2} (4.7/sq mi)	December 3, 1862
Sonora	—	2,944,840	2,662,480	+10.6%	179,354.7	69,249.2	16.4/km^{2} (42.5/sq mi)	—
Mexico	—	126,014,024	112,336,538	+12.2%	1,960,646.7	757,010	64.3/km^{2} (166.5/sq mi)	—
