= Tepache Municipality =

Coordinates: 29.5167°N 109.5167°W

Tepache
- Municipality
- Coat of arms

- Location of the municipality in Sonora
- Country: Mexico
- State: Sonora
- Seat: Tepache
- Time zone: UTC-7 (Zona Pacífico)

Tepache is a municipality in the state of Sonora in north-western Mexico.

Its seat is Tepache.

== Area and population ==
The municipal area is 752.85 km^{2}. The municipal population counted in 2000 was 1,539, of which 779 were male and 760 were female. The population of the main settlement and municipal seat was 1,448 in 2000. The majority (96 percent) of its population lives in urban areas, with the rest living in rural areas. The population has been decreasing steadily since 1980. The main settlement is located at an elevation of 1,250 meters.

== Neighboring municipalities ==
Neighboring municipalities are Divisaderos and Moctezuma to the north, Nácori Chico to the east, Sahuaripa to the west and San Pedro de la Cueva to the southwest.
