= San Pedro de la Cueva Municipality =

Coordinates: 29.2875°N 109.7249°W

San Pedro de la Cueva
- Municipality
- Coat of arms

- Location of the municipality in Sonora
- Country: Mexico
- State: Sonora

Area
  - Total: 1,926.36 km^{2} (743.77 sq mi)

Population (2020)
  - Total: 1,458
- Time zone: UTC-7 (Zona Pacífico)

San Pedro de la Cueva is a municipality in the state of Sonora in north-western Mexico.

Its seat is San Pedro de la Cueva.

The municipal area is 1,926.36 km^{2}. The population in 2020 was 1,458.

Neighboring municipalities are Moctezuma and Tepache to the north, Sahuaripa to the east, Bacanora to the south, and Villa Pesqueira to the southwest.
