= Mazatán =

Mazatán or Mazatan may refer to:

- Mazatán, Chiapas, Mexico
- Mazatán, Sonora, Mexico
  - Mazatán Municipality, Sonora
