= San Javier Municipality, Sonora =

Coordinates: 28.5932°N 109.7603°W

San Javier
- Municipality
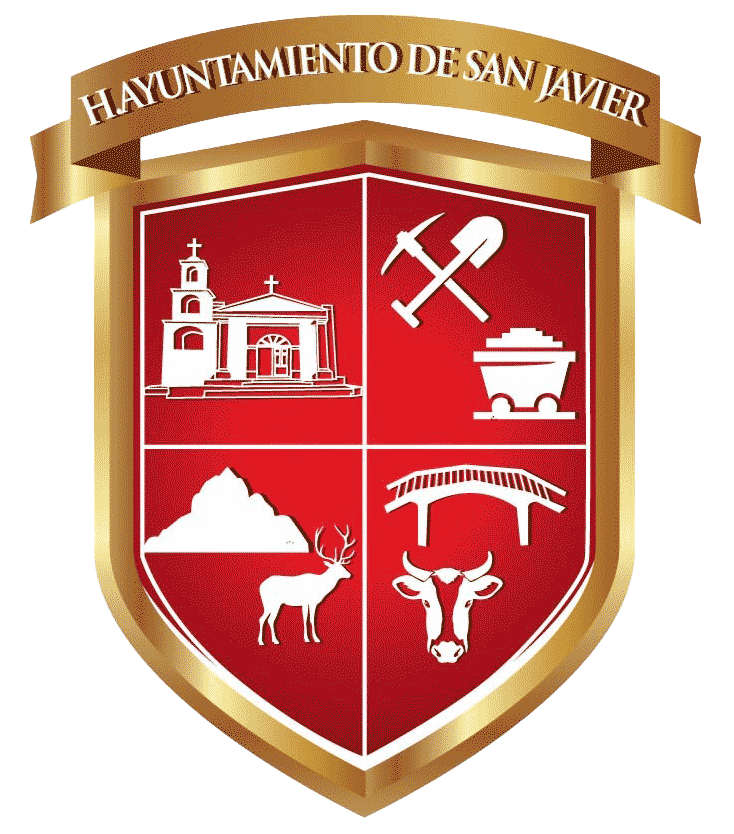
- Coat of arms

- Location of the municipality in Sonora
- Country: Mexico
- State: Sonora
- Seat: San Javier, Sonora

Population (2015)
  - Total: 557
- Time zone: UTC-7 (Zona Pacífico)

San Javier is a municipality in the state of Sonora in north-western Mexico. As of 2015, the municipality had a total population of 557.

The municipal seat is at San Javier, Sonora.

The area of the municipality is 793.27 km^{2}. and the population was 557 in 2015. Surrounding municipalities are Soyopa to the north, Ónavas to the east, Suaqui Grande to the south, and Colorada to the west.
