= Ónavas Municipality =

Ónavas
- Municipality
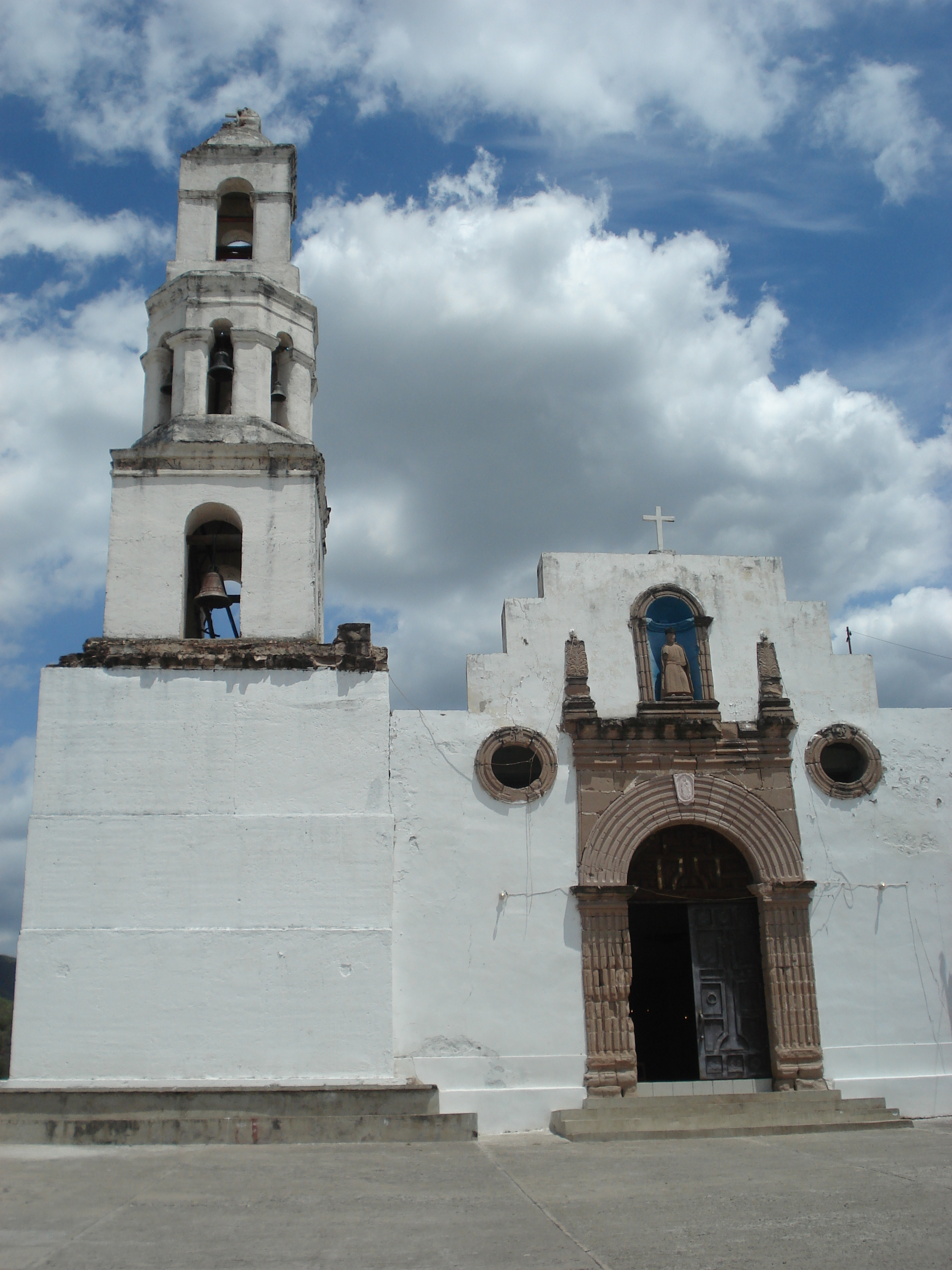
- Church in Ónavas

- Coat of arms

- Location of the municipality in Sonora
- Coordinates: 28°27′N 109°31′W
- Country: Mexico
- State: Sonora
- Seat: Ónavas
- Time zone: UTC-7 (Zona Pacífico)

Ónavas is a municipality in the state of Sonora in northwestern Mexico, being the least populous municipality in Sonora. The municipal seat is at Ónavas.

== Area and population ==
The municipal area is 529.48 km^{2} with a population of 479 registered in 2000. INEGI Most of this population lives in the small municipal seat. It is located at an elevation of 180 meters. The municipal population has been decreasing since 1980 when it was 586.

== Neighboring municipalities ==
Neighboring municipalities are Soyopa to the north, Yécora to the east, Suaqui Grande to the southwest, and San Javier to the west. Ónavas is crossed by the Río Yaqui, which rises in Chihuahua and flows into the Pacific Ocean.
