= Antonio Astiazarán =

Mexican politician (born 1971)

- Antonio Astiazaran in 2017
- Born: 13 July 1971 (age 55); Guaymas, Sonora, Mexico
- Education: University of Hermosillo; University of Essex
- Occupation: Politician
- Title: Municipal president of Hermosillo
- Predecessor: Fermín González Gaxiola
- Political party: PAN (2018-)
- Other political affiliations: PRI (1988-2018)
- Spouse: Patricia Ruibal

Antonio Francisco Astiazarán Gutiérrez (born 13 July 1971) is a Mexican politician affiliated with the National Action Party (PAN) Until 2018, he was affiliated with the Institutional Revolutionary Party (PRI).

He has held the position of municipal president of Hermosillo since 2024. He served as a federal deputy in the 59th and 62nd sessions of Congress (2003–2006 and 2012–2015), representing Sonora's fourth district on both occasions and head of the office of the Secretariat of Social Development between 2017 and 2018 He also served as municipal president of Guaymas from 2006 to 2009. He became the first municipal president of Hermosillo to win reelection in 2024.
