= Soyopa Municipality =

Coordinates: 28.7987°N 109.6467°W

Soyopa
- Municipality
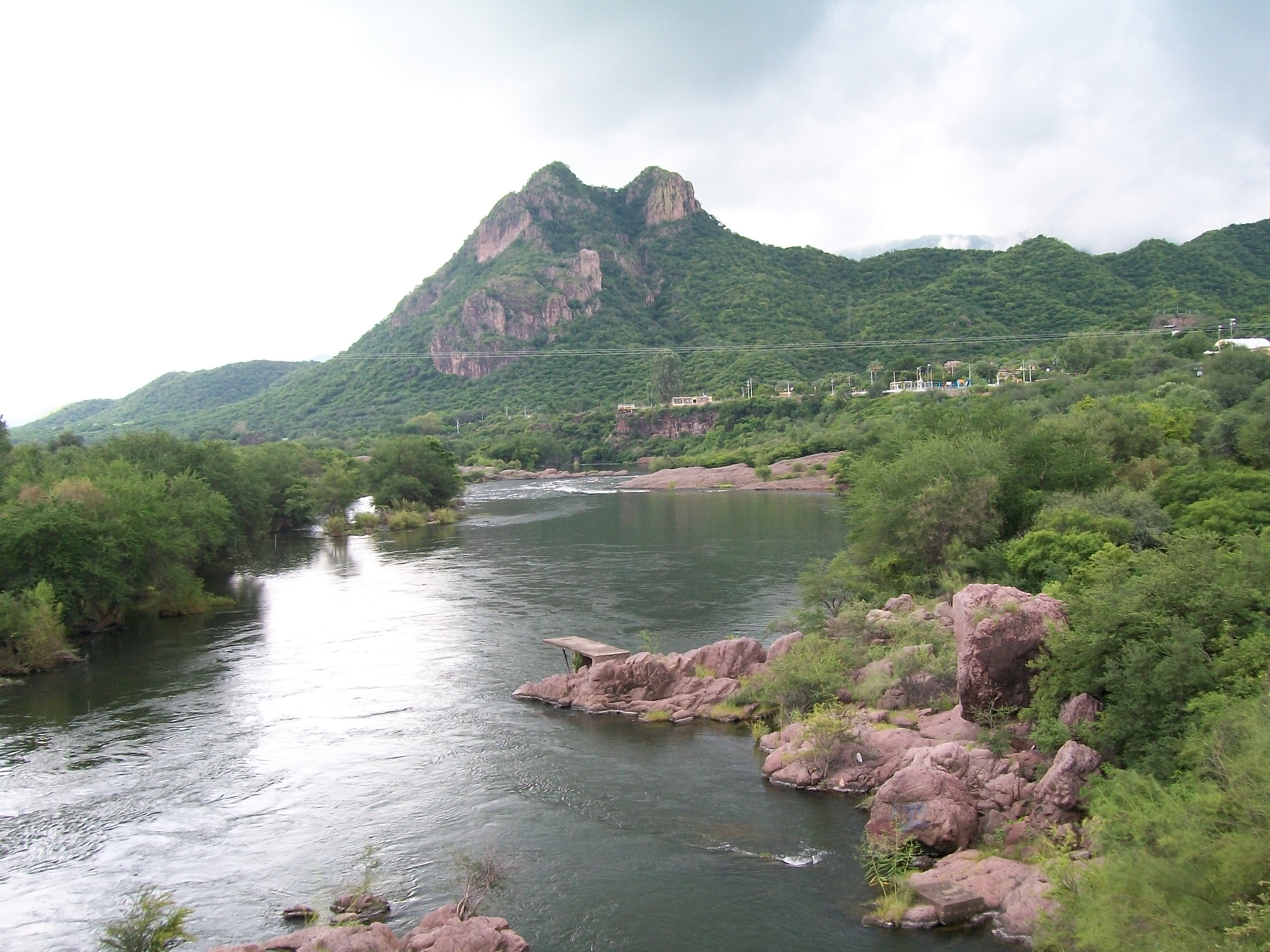
- El Novillo Dam in Soyopa

- Coat of arms

- Location of the municipality in Sonora
- Country: Mexico
- State: Sonora
- Seat: Soyopa
- Time zone: UTC-7 (Zona Pacífico)

Soyopa is a municipality in the state of Sonora in north-western Mexico. The municipal seat is at Soyopa.

The municipal area is 846.33 km^{2}. and the population was 1,649 in 2000.

Neighboring municipalities are:

- Northeast: Bacanora
- South: Onavas
- Southwest: San Javier
- West: La Colorada
- Northwest: Villa Pesqueira
