= Opodepe Municipality =

Opodepe
- Municipality
- Coat of arms

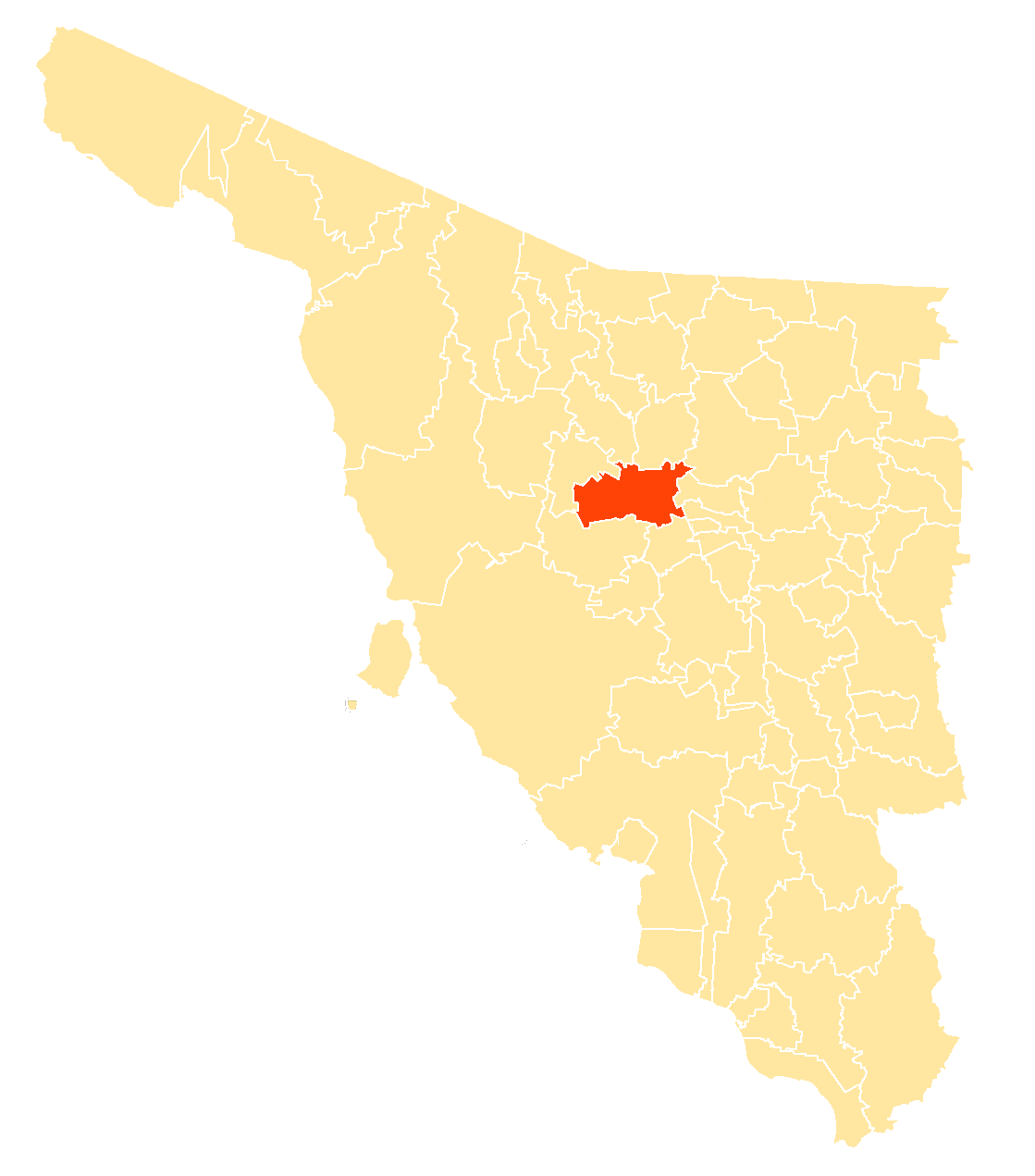
- Location of the municipality in Sonora

- Location in Sonora Location in Mexico
- Coordinates: 30.0479°N 110.7654°W
- Country: Mexico
- State: Sonora
- Seat: Opodepe
- Time zone: UTC–07:00 (Zona Pacífico)

Opodepe is a municipality in the state of Sonora in north-western Mexico.

The municipal seat is Opodepe.

The municipal area is 2,804.25 km^{2} with a population of 2,842 registered in 2000.

== Borders ==
Neighboring municipalities are Benjamín Hill, Santa Ana, Cucurpe, Arizpe, Banámichi, San Felipe de Jesús, Carbó, Rayón and Trincheras.
