= Mazatán Municipality, Sonora =

Coordinates: 28.9831°N 110.1517°W

Mazatán
- Municipality
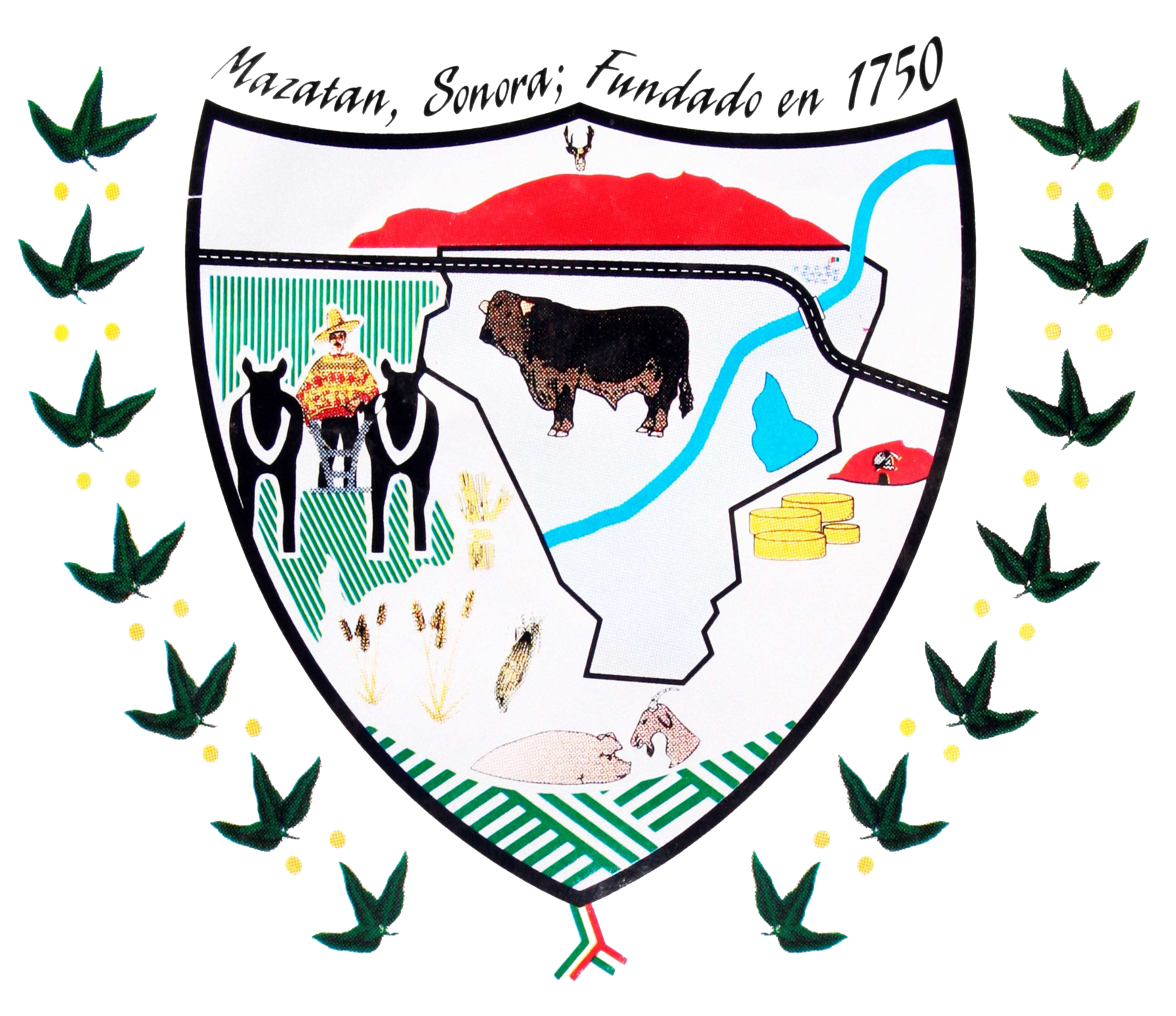
- Coat of arms

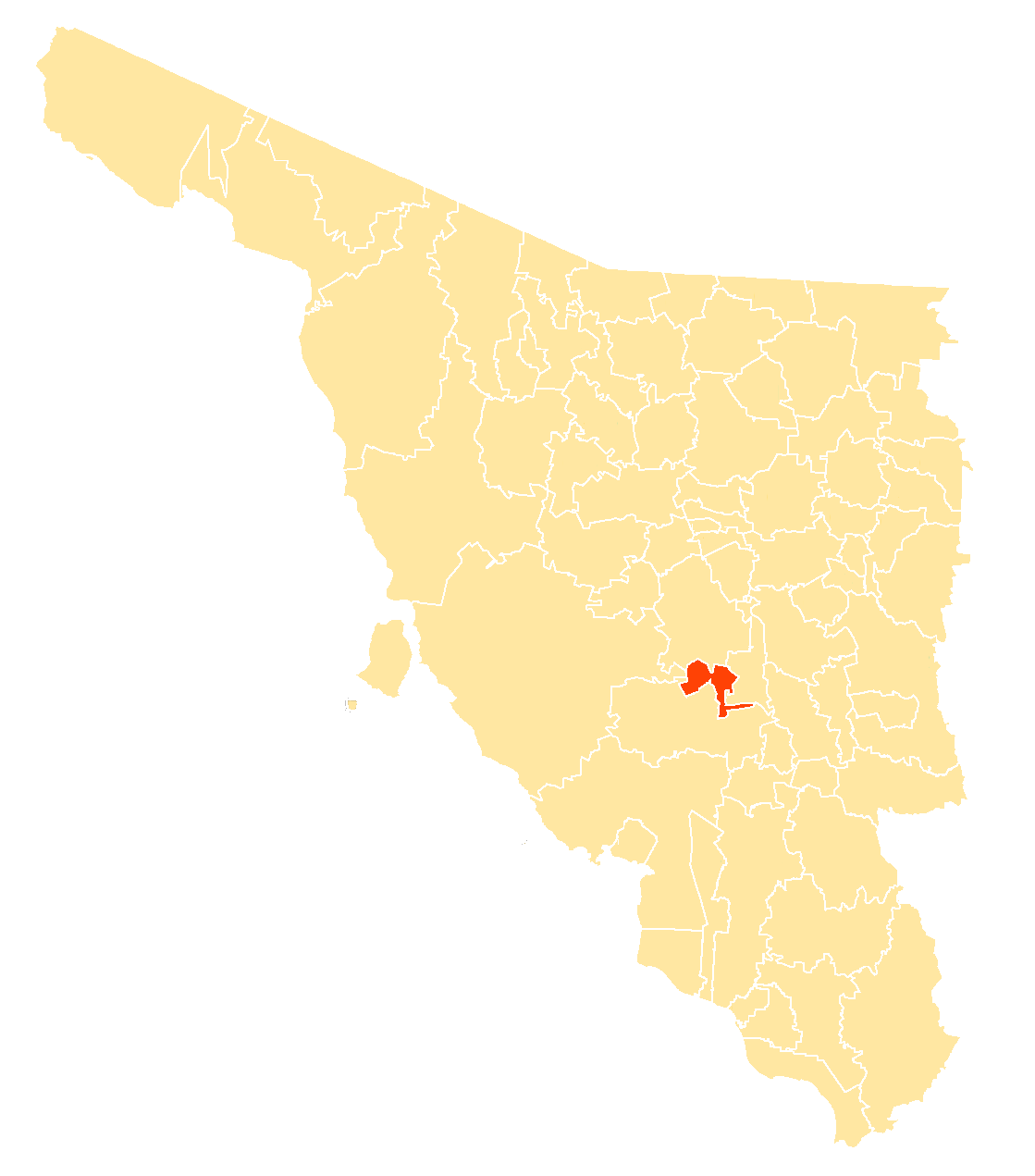
- Location of the municipality in Sonora
- Country: Mexico
- State: Sonora
- Seat: Mazatán, Sonora
- Time zone: UTC-7 (Zona Pacífico)

Mazatán is a municipality in the state of Sonora in north-western Mexico. The municipal seat is at Mazatán, Sonora.

== Area and population ==
The municipal area is 649.27 km^{2} with a population of 4,187 registered in 2000. The municipal seat had a population of 1,499 in 2000. It is located at an elevation of 450 meters.

== Neighboring municipalities ==
Neighboring municipalities are Ures, Villa Pesqueira, La Colorada, and Hermosillo.
