= Huásabas Municipality =

Coordinates: 29.9592°N 109.3726°W

Huásabas
- Municipality
- Coat of arms

- Location of the municipality in Sonora
- Country: Mexico
- State: Sonora
- Seat: Huásabas
- Time zone: UTC-7 (Zona Pacífico)

Huásabas is a municipality in the state of Sonora in north-western Mexico. In 2020, the municipality reported a total population of 888.

The municipal seat is at Huásabas.

Neighboring municipalities are Villa Hidalgo, Granados, Bacadehuachi, Cumpas, and Moctezuma.
