= Carlos Zatarain González =

Mexican politician (born 1961)

- Born: 21 August 1961 (age 65); Guaymas, Sonora, Mexico
- Education: University of Guadalajara
- Occupation: Politician
- Political party: PRI

Carlos Ernesto Zatarain González (born 21 August 1961) is a Mexican politician from the state of Sonora. He served as a federal deputy in the 60th Congress, representing Sonora's fourth district for the Institutional Revolutionary Party (PRI). Before that, he was a local deputy in the 55th session of the Congress of Sonora from 1997 to 2000 and municipal president of Guaymas from 2003 to 2006.
