= Bavispe Municipality =

Bavispe
- Municipality
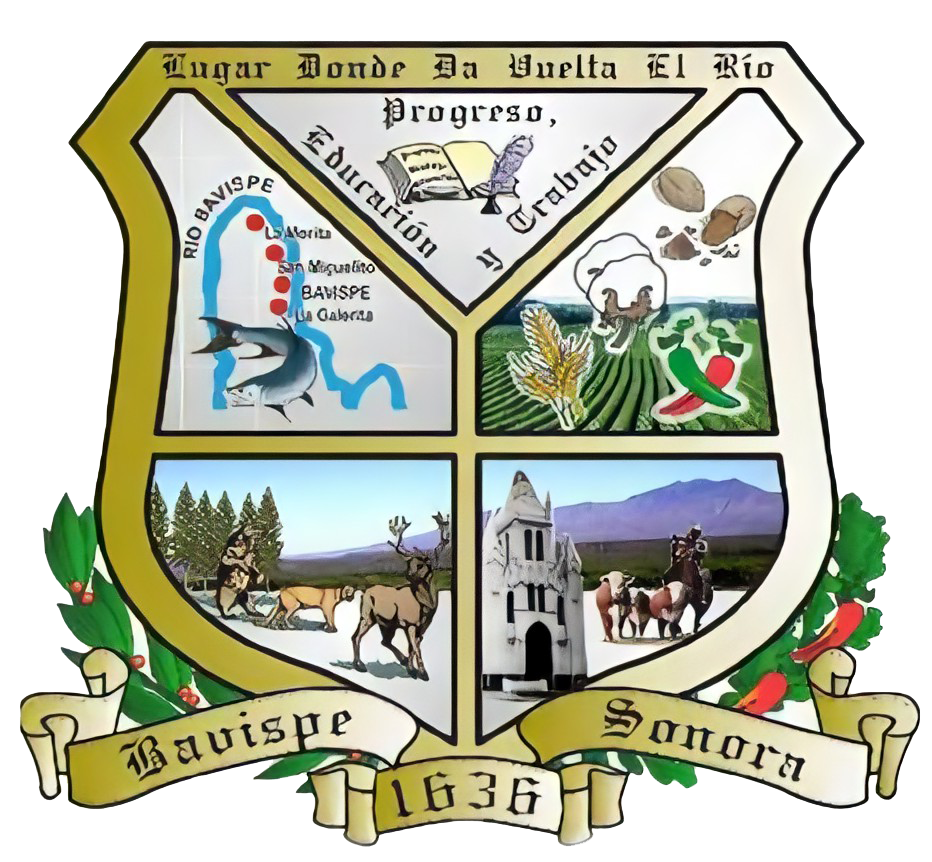
- Coat of arms
- Interactive map of Bavispe
- Coordinates: 30°28′N 108°56′W
- Country: Mexico
- State: Sonora
- Seat: Bavispe

Area
  - Total: 1,723 km^{2} (665 sq mi)

Population (2020)
  - Total: 1,169
  - Density: 0.6785/km^{2} (1.757/sq mi)
- Time zone: UTC-7 (Zona Pacífico)

Bavispe is a municipality in the state of Sonora in north-western Mexico. The municipality covers an area of 1,723 km^{2}.

== Demographics ==
In 2010, the municipality had a total population of 1,454. The municipality has 12 localities, the largest of which (with 2010 populations in parentheses) were: Bavispe (701), classified as urban; and San Miguelito (456), La Mora (218), La Galerita (64), La Vega Azul (5), Oaxaca (3), Los Caballos (2), La Galera (1), Tasabiri (1), El Fuste (1) and Las Cuevas (1), classified as rural.

By the time of the 2020 Census, the municipality's population had fallen to 1,169.

== Geography ==
Bavispe Municipality borders municipalities in Sonora on the south, west and north, and municipalities in Chihuahua on its east.
