= Empalme Municipality =

Coordinates: 27.9244°N 110.7917°W

Empalme
- Municipality
- Coat of arms

- Location of the municipality in Sonora
- Country: Mexico
- State: Sonora
- Seat: Empalme, Sonora

Population (2020)
  - Total: 51,431
- Time zone: UTC–07:00 (Zona Pacífico)
- Area code: +52 622

Empalme is a municipality in the state of Sonora in north-western Mexico. In 2015, the municipality had a total population of 56,177, which had fallen to 51,431 by 2020.

The municipal seat is the homonymous city.

== Government ==
=== Municipal presidents ===
Municipal president	Term	Political party	Notes
Miguel Verdugo Rojas	1976–1979	PRI	
Marcial Bazúa Vizcarra	1979–1982	PAN	
Ronaldo Camacho Durán	1982–1985	PRI	
Heriberto Lizárraga Zataráin	1985–1988	PRI	
José María Medina Cruz	1988–1991	PRI	
Miguel Gaspar Bojórquez	1991–1994	PRI	
Vladimiro Samaniego Villasana	1994–1997	PRI	
Jesús Ávila Godoy	1997–2000	PRD	
Reynaldo Rodríguez Ortiz	2000–2003	PRD	
Juan Manuel Sauceda Morales	2003–2006	PRD	
Héctor Samuel Rodríguez Sánchez	16-09-2006–15-09-2009	PRI; Panal	Alliance PRI Sonora-Panal
Francisco Javier Caraveo Rincón	16-09-2009–15-09-2012	PAN	
Héctor Moisés Laguna Torres	16-09-2012–15-09-2015	PAN	
Carlos Enrique Gómez Cota	16-09-2015–15-09-2018	PRI	
Miguel Francisco Javier Genesta Sesma	16-09-2018–15-09-2021	PT; Morena; PES	Coalition "Together We Will Make History"
Luis Fuentes Aguilar	16-09-2021–15-09-2024	Morena	
Luis Fuentes Aguilar	16-09-2024–	Morena; PVEM PT; Panal Sonora PES Sonora	He was reelected
