= Rayón Municipality, Sonora =

Coordinates: 29.7621°N 110.5640°W

Rayón
- Municipality
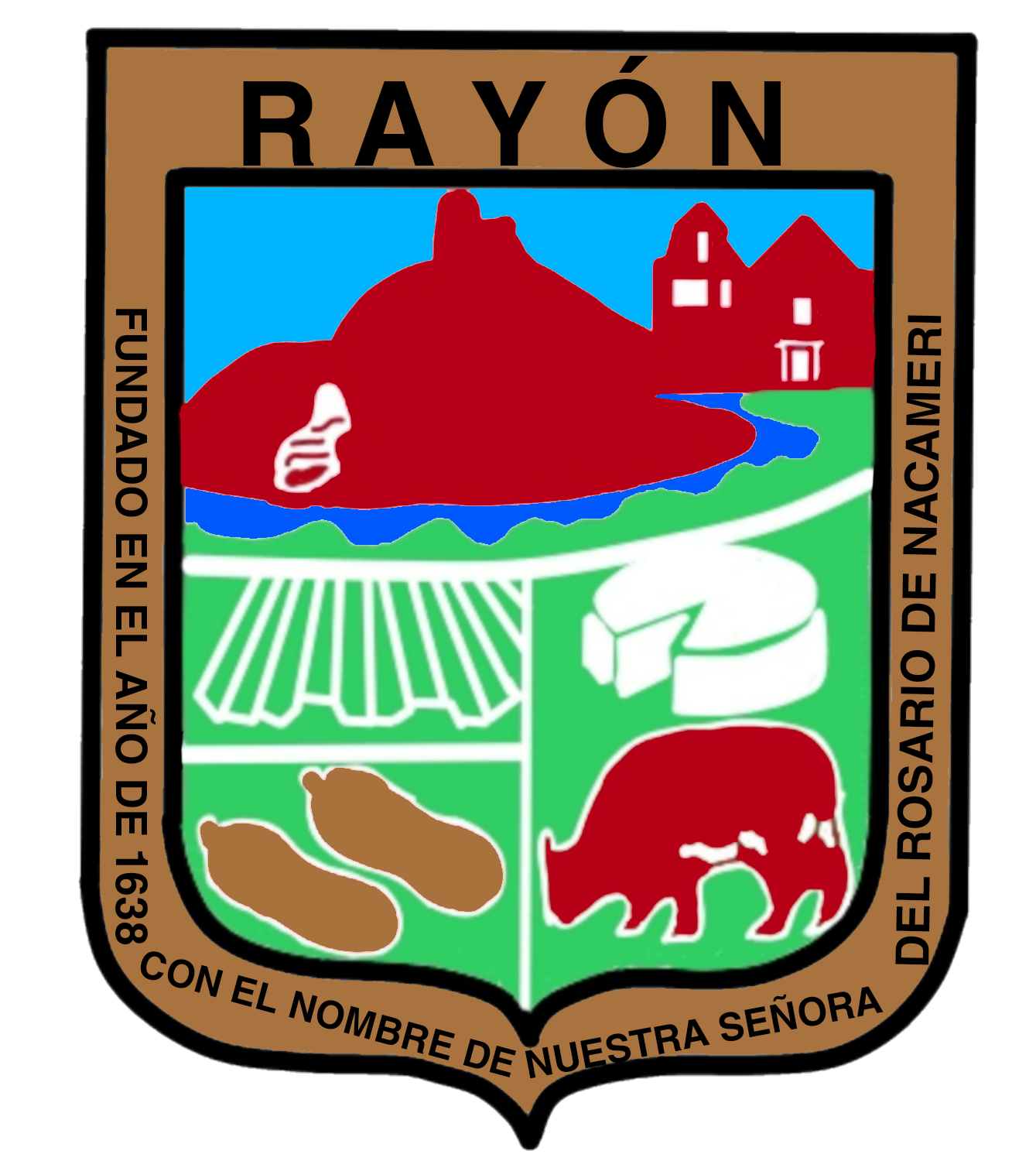
- Coat of arms

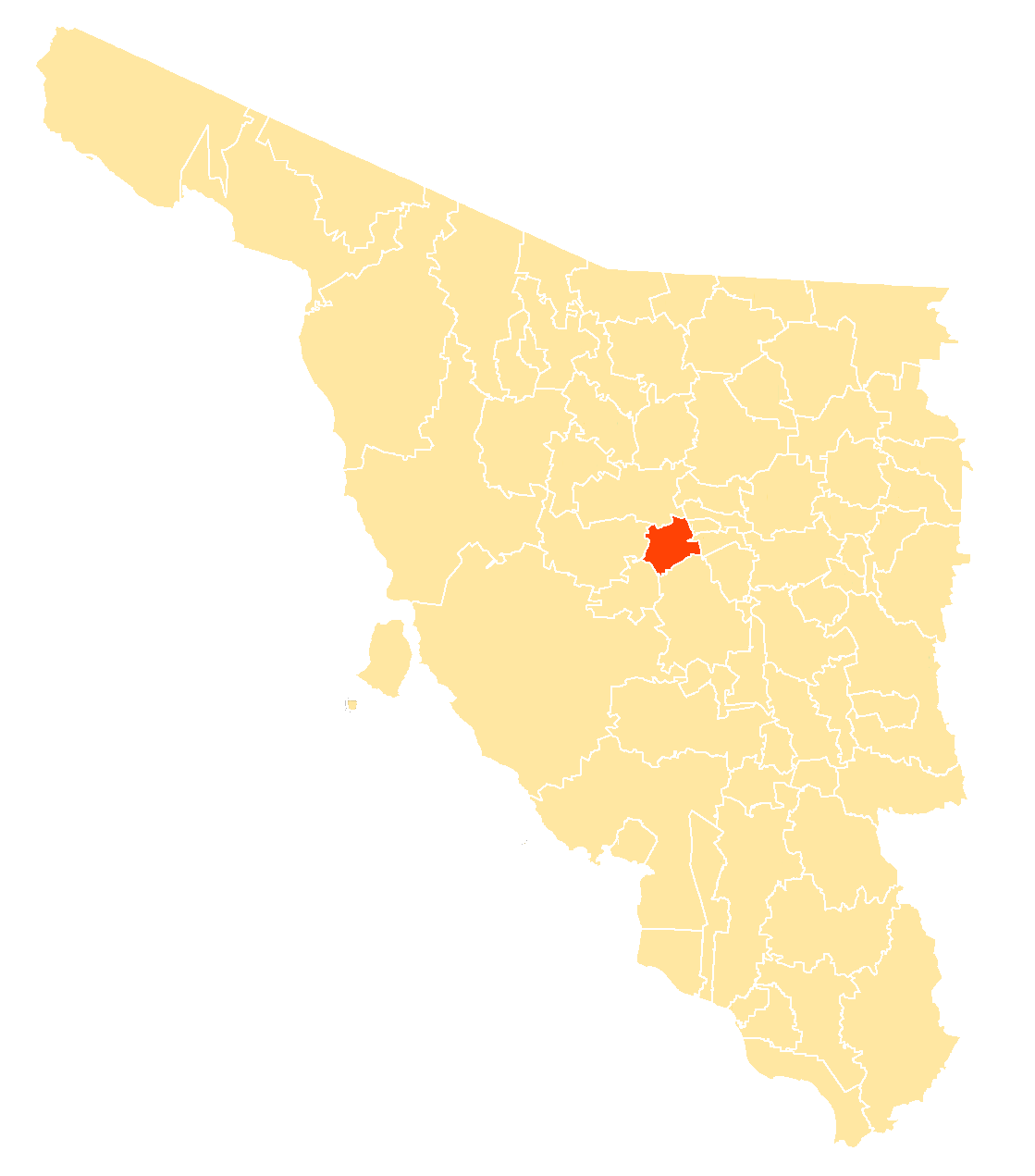
- Location of the municipality in Sonora
- Country: Mexico
- State: Sonora
- Seat: Rayón, Sonora

Population (2020)
  - Total: 1,496
- Time zone: UTC-7 (Zona Pacífico)

Rayón is a municipality in the state of Sonora in north-western Mexico.

The seat is at Rayón, Sonora.

== Area and population ==
The municipal area is 1,106.54 km^{2} with a population of 1,591 registered in 2000.

== Neighboring municipalities ==
Neighboring municipalities are:

- Opodepe—north
- Aconchi—east
- Ures—southeast
- San Miguel de Horcasitas—southwest
- Carbó—west
