= San Miguel de Horcasitas Municipality =

Coordinates: 29.4450°N 110.8187°W

San Miguel de Horcasitas
- Municipality
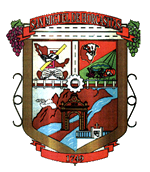
- Coat of arms

- Location of the municipality in Sonora
- Country: Mexico
- State: Sonora
- Seat: San Miguel de Horcasitas
- Time zone: UTC-7 (Zona Pacífico)

San Miguel de Horcasitas is a municipality in the state of Sonora in north-western Mexico. The municipal seat is at San Miguel de Horcasitas.

The municipal area is 1,768.45 km^{2}. The population was in 2020 was 10,729.

Neighboring municipalities are: Rayón to the northeast, Ures to the east, Hermosillo to the south, and Carbó to the northwest.
