= Suaqui Grande Municipality =

Coordinates: 28.3952°N 109.8888°W

Suaqui Grande
- Municipality
- Coat of arms

- Location of the municipality in Sonora
- Country: Mexico
- State: Sonora
- Seat: Suaqui Grande
- Time zone: UTC-7 (Zona Pacífico)
- Website: suaquigrande.gob.mx

Suaqui Grande is a municipality in the state of Sonora in north-western Mexico.

The seat is Suaqui Grande.

The municipal area is 889.28 km^{2}. and the population was 1,102 in 2000.
