= Bacadéhuachi Municipality =

Coordinates: 29.8083°N 109.1417°W

Bacadéhuachi
- Municipality
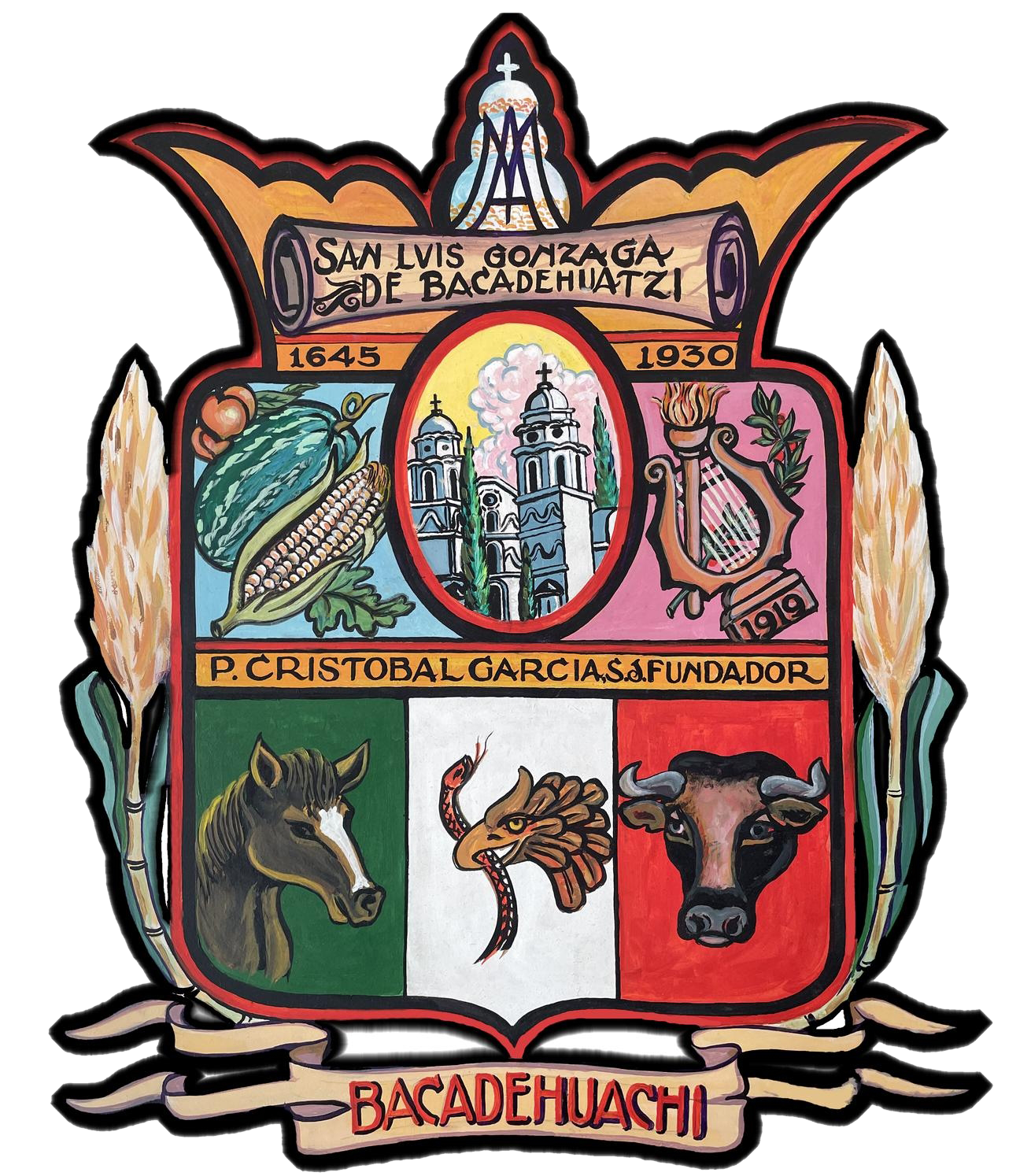
- Coat of arms

- Location of the municipality in Sonora
- Country: Mexico
- State: Sonora
- Seat: Bacadéhuachi

Area
  - Total: 1,066.38 km^{2} (411.73 sq mi)

Population (2020)
  - Total: 979
  - Density: 0.91/km^{2} (2.4/sq mi)
- Time zone: UTC-7 (Zona Pacífico)

Bacadéhuachi (Spanish pronunciation: [bakaˈðewatʃi]) is a municipality in the state of Sonora in north-western Mexico. The municipality covers an area of km^{2}. As of 2020, the municipality had a total population of 979.

Its seat is Bacadéhuachi.

== Area and population ==
The area of the municipality is 1,530.47 km^{2} and the population was 1,264 in 2005, most of whom were residing in the only settlement, which serves as the municipal seat. . The municipal seat is located at an elevation of 850 meters.
