= Nácori Chico Municipality =

Coordinates: 29.6760°N 108.8245°W

Nácori Chico
- Municipality
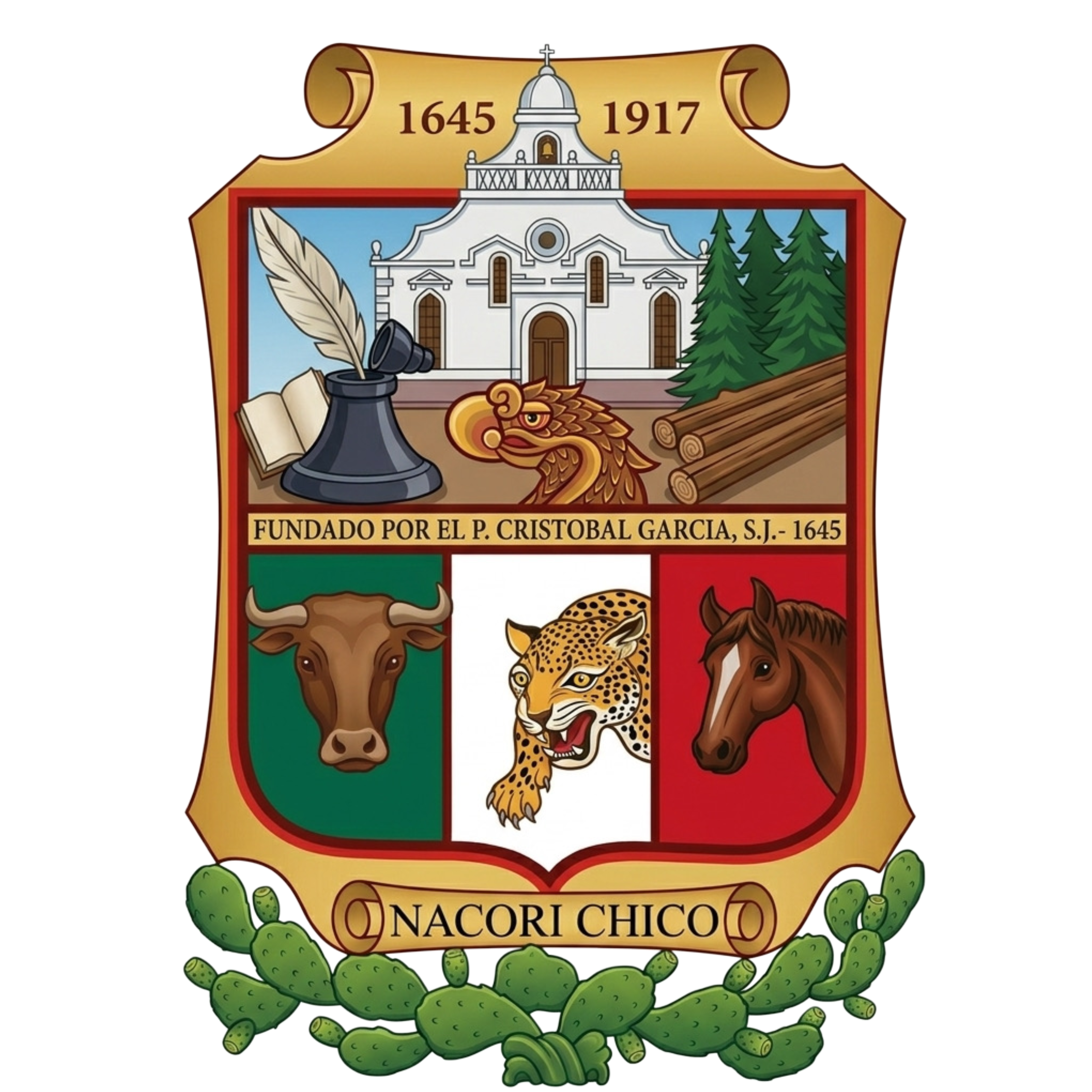
- Coat of arms

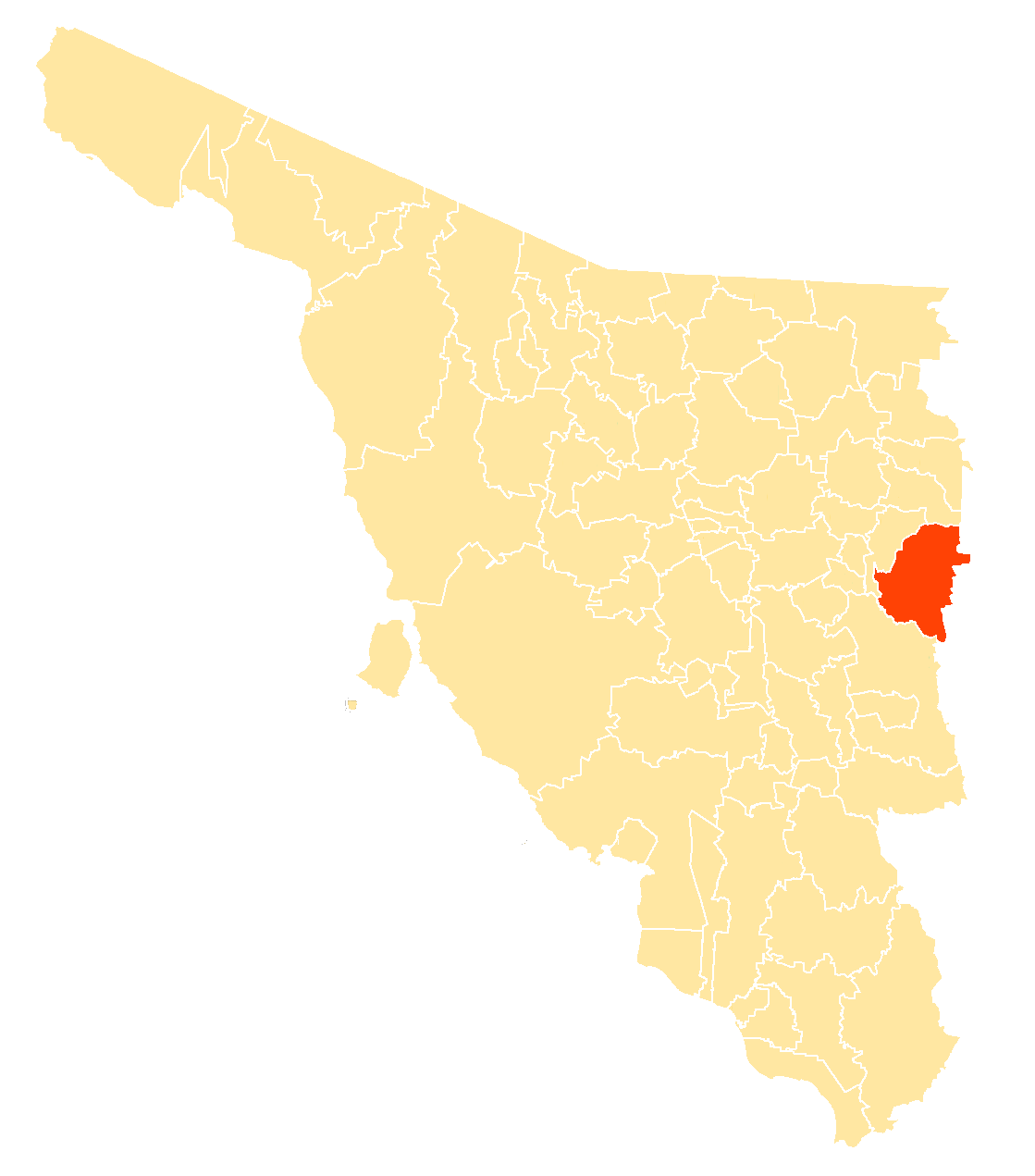
- Location of the municipality in Sonora
- Country: Mexico
- State: Sonora
- Seat: Nácori Chico

Population (2020)
  - Total: 1,531
- Time zone: UTC-7 (Zona Pacífico)
- Website: nacorichico.gob.mx

Nácori Chico is a municipality in the state of Sonora in northwestern Mexico, being the easternmost municipality in Sonora.

The municipal area is 2,748.67 km^{2} (1,061.27 mi^{2}) with a population of 2,236 registered in 2000.

The seat is Nácori Chico.

== Neighboring municipalities ==
Neighboring municipalities are: Huachinera to the north, Sahuaripa to the south, Bacadéhuachi to the west, and the state of Chihuahua to the east. Nácori Chico is connected by a dirt road to Bacadéhuachi

== Towns and villages ==
The largest localities (cities, towns, and villages) are:

Name	2020 Census Population
Nácori Chico	816
La Mesa Tres Ríos	463
El Sauz	114
Buena Vista	76
Tecoriname	46
Tres Ríos	5
El Pilar	4
Total Municipality	1,531
