= San Ignacio Río Muerto Municipality =

Coordinates: 27.3734°N 110.2615°W

San Ignacio Río Muerto
- Municipality
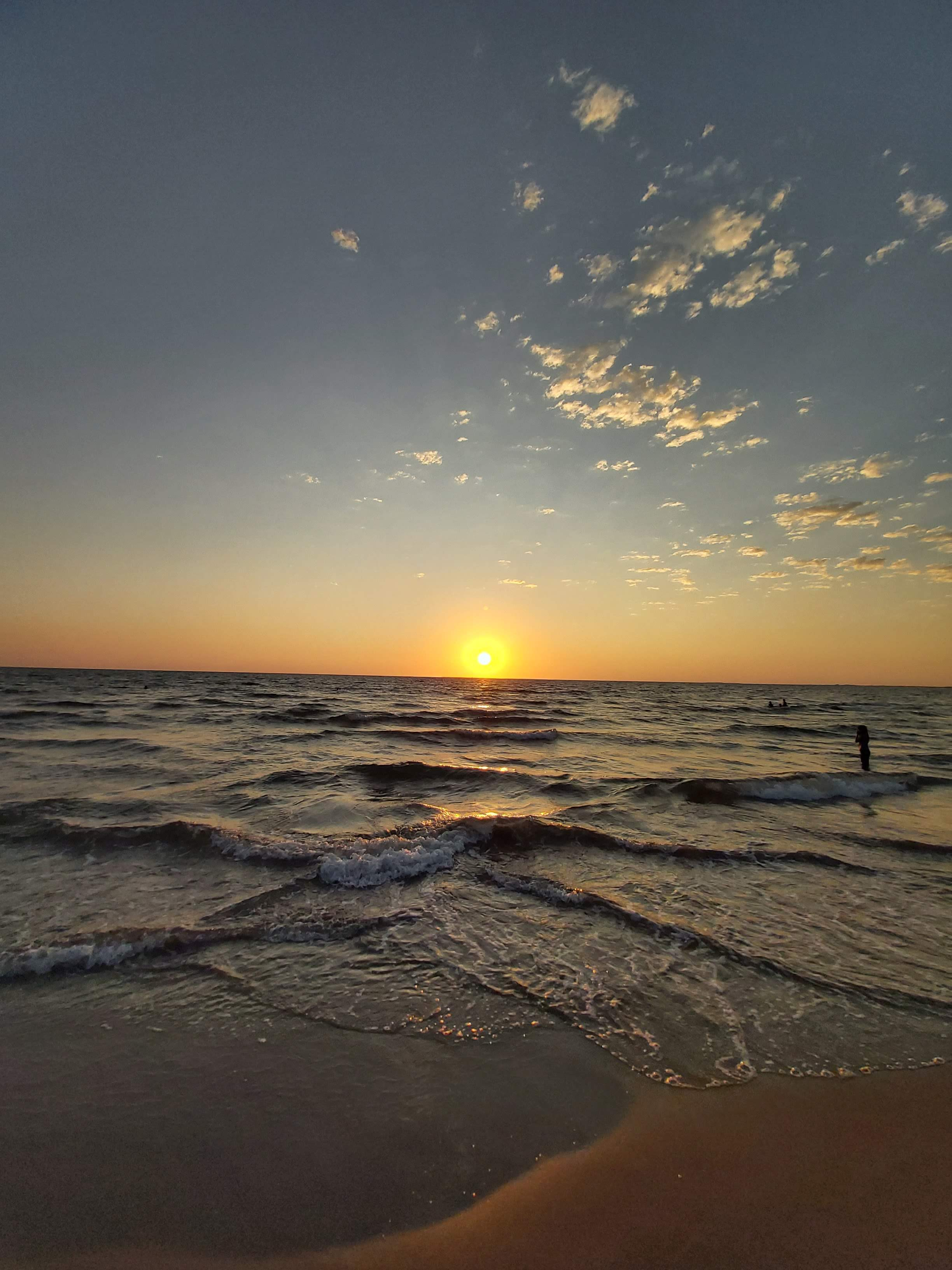
- Bahía de Lobos in San Ignacio Río Muerto

- Coat of arms

- Location of the municipality in Sonora
- Country: Mexico
- State: Sonora
- Seat: San Ignacio Río Muerto
- Time zone: UTC–07:00 (Zona Pacífico)
- Area code: +52 643

San Ignacio Río Muerto is a municipality in the state of Sonora in north-western Mexico. The municipal seat is at San Ignacio Río Muerto.

== Area and population ==
The municipal area is 1,144.00 km^{2} with a population of 13,692 registered in 2000. The population of the municipal seat was 6,937 in 2000. It is located at an elevation that varies between 0 and 50 meters.

== Neighboring municipalities ==
Neighboring municipalities are:

- Guaymas—north
- Bácum—north and east

Its western and southeastern boundaries are with the Gulf of California.

== History ==
The municipality was created in 1996.
