= Huachinera Municipality =

Coordinates: 30.2056°N 108.9577°W

Huachinera
- Municipality
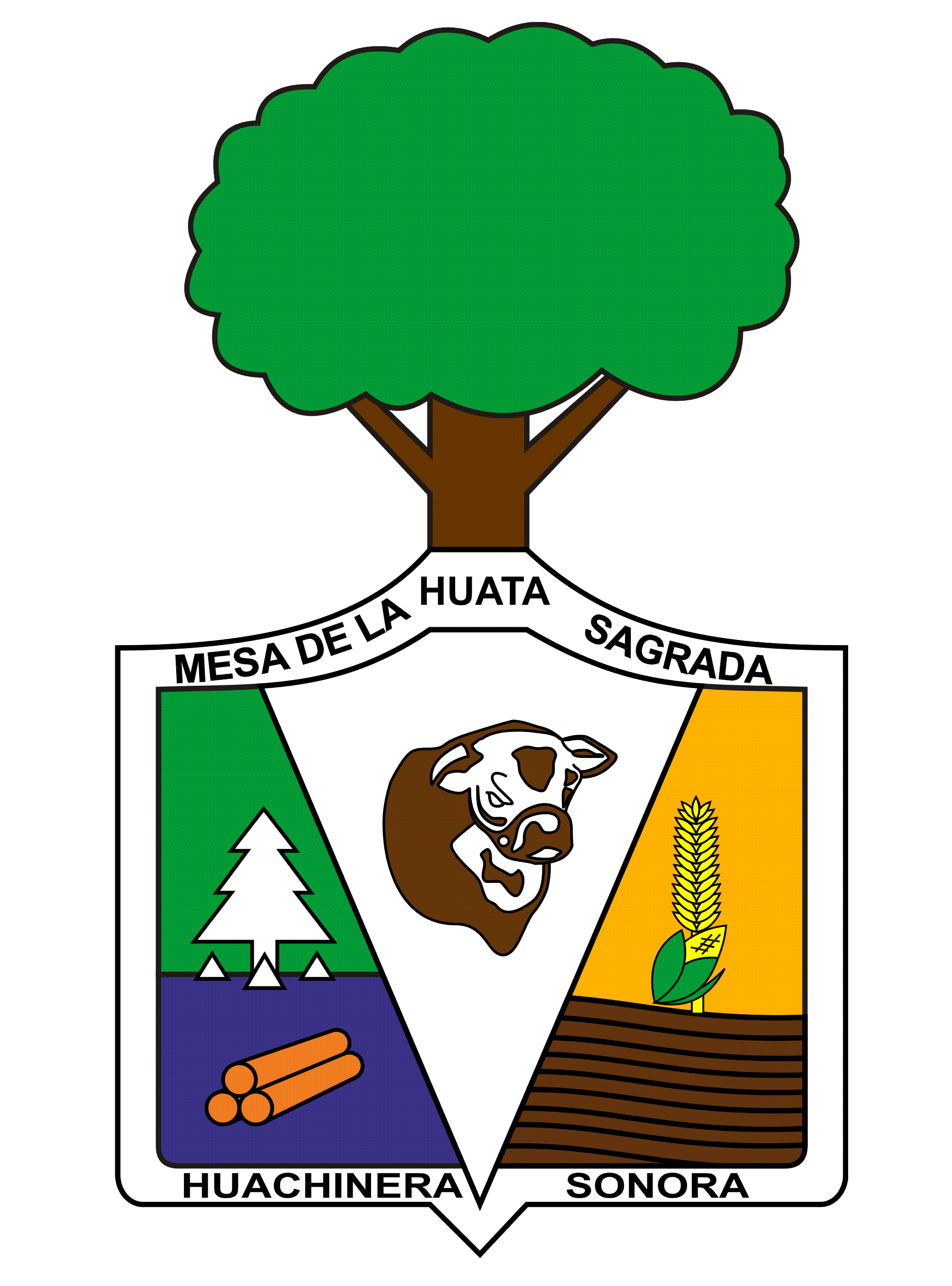
- Coat of arms

- Location of the municipality in Sonora
- Country: Mexico
- State: Sonora
- Seat: Huachinera

Population (2020)
  - Total: 1,186
- Time zone: UTC-7 (Zona Pacífico)

Huachinera is a municipality in the state of Sonora in north-western Mexico.

The population of the municipal seat was 732 in 2000. In the 2020 Census, the municipality reported a total population of 1,186.
