= Bacerac Municipality =

Coordinates: 30.2976°N 108.8168°W

Bacerac
- Municipality
- Coat of arms
- Interactive map of Bacerac
- Country: Mexico
- State: Sonora
- Municipal seat: Bacerac

Area
  - Land: 1,346.03 km^{2} (519.71 sq mi)

Population (2020)
  - Total: 1,221
  - Density: 0.907/km^{2} (2.35/sq mi)
- Time zone: UTC-7 (Zona Pacífico)

Bacerac is a municipality in the state of Sonora in north-western Mexico. The municipal seat is at Bacerac.

== Towns and villages ==
There are 13 localities in the municipality of Bacerac, the largest of which are:

Name	2020 Census Population
Bacerac	1,019
San José de los Pozos	67
Tamichopa	56
Agua Fría	30
Ciénega de Horcones	30
Las Moctezumas	4
Total municipality	1,221
