= Bacanora Municipality =

Coordinates: 28.8491°N 109.3657°W

Bacanora
- Municipality
- Coat of arms

- Location of the municipality in Sonora
- Country: Mexico
- State: Sonora
- Municipal seat: Bacanora, Sonora

Area
  - Total: 1,131.11 km^{2} (436.72 sq mi)

Population (2020)
  - Total: 759
  - Density: 67/km^{2} (170/sq mi)
- Time zone: UTC-7 (Zona Pacífico)

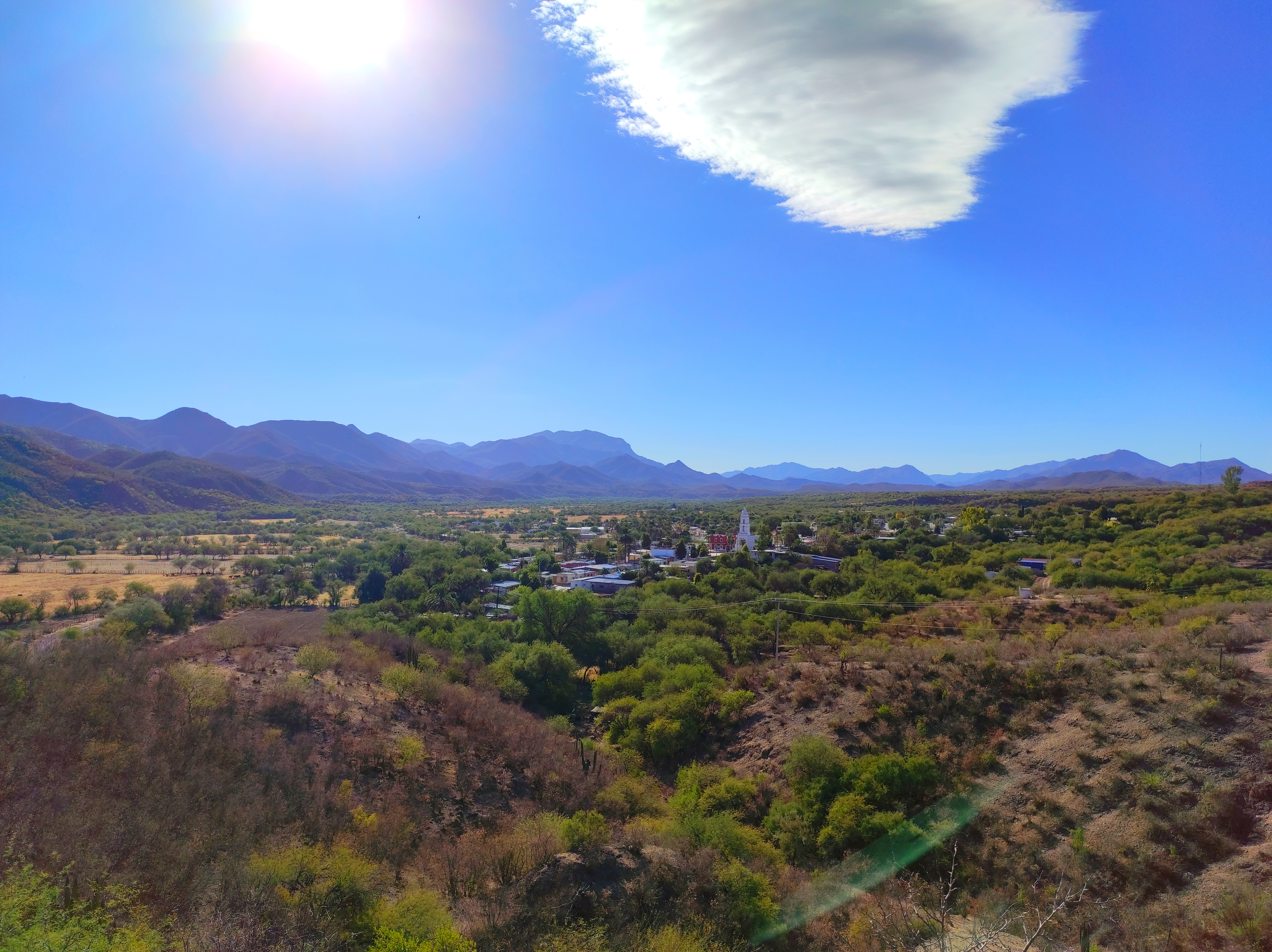
Panoramic view of the hills in Bacanora Cerros

Bacanora is a municipality in the state of Sonora in north-western Mexico. The municipal seat is at Bacanora, Sonora.
