= Moctezuma, Sonora =

Coordinates: 29°47′N 109°40′W

Moctezuma
- Municipality
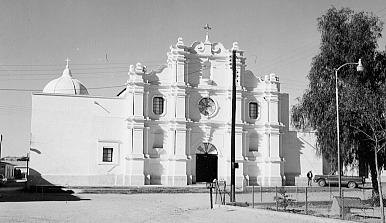
- San Miguel Arcángel de Oposura, 1971

- Coat of arms

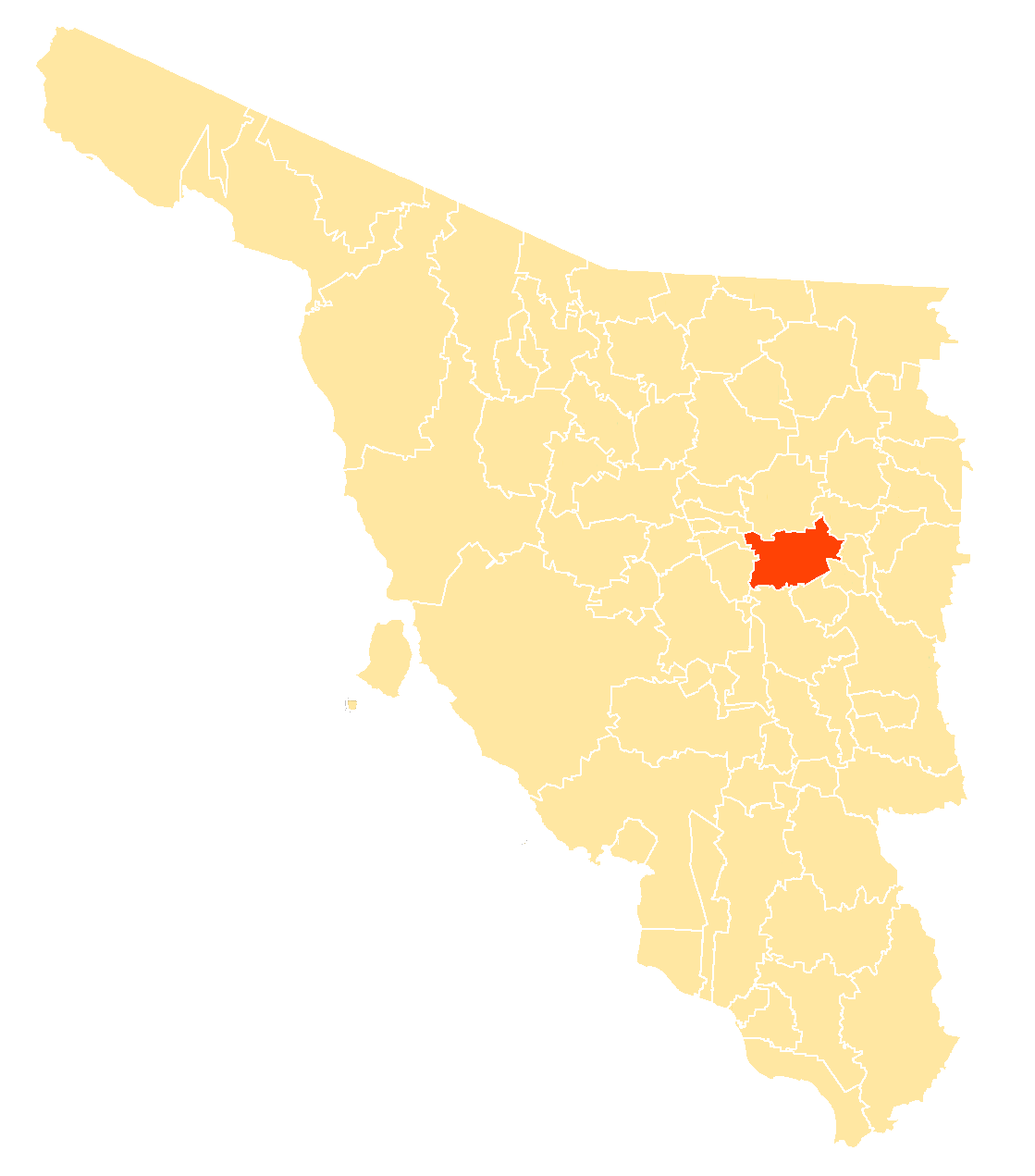
- Location of the municipality in Sonora
- Country: Mexico
- State: Sonora
- Seat: Moctezuma, Sonora

Population (2020)
  - Total: 5,173
- Time zone: UTC-7 (Zona Pacífico)

Moctezuma is a municipio (municipality) of the Mexican state of Sonora, located in the state's central region. It is also the name of its largest settlement and cabecera municipal (municipal seat).

== Area and population ==
The municipal area is 1,763.39 km^{2}, with a population of 4,187 registered in 2000. The municipal seat had a population of 3,798 in 2000. It is located at an elevation of 677 meters.

== Neighboring municipalities ==
Neighboring municipalities are Cumpas in the north, Huásabas, Granados and Divisaderos in the east, Tepache, San Pedro de la Cueva Villa Pesqueira, and Baviácora in the west.

== Road connections ==
Moctezuma is 140 kilometers on Federal Highway 14 from Hermosillo passing through Ures, and Mazocahui. From Agua Prieta on Federal Highway 17 the distance is 204 km passing through Fronteras, Esqueda, and Nacozari.

== History ==
When the Spanish arrived the land was occupied by the Opata Indians. The settlement is believed to have been established by the Jesuit missionary Marcos del Río.

San Miguel Arcángel de Oposura, a large burnt brick church with vaulted ceiling, side bays, and an octagonal chapel with a wooden roof, was built by unidentified maestros brought to the site at great expense by Father Daniel Janusque sometime before his death in 1724. It continued under two of his successors until it was finished in February 1738.

The town was renamed Moctezuma in 1828, while before the name had been San Miguel Arcángel de Oposura, and later "Oposura". Etymologically, Oposura means place of a lot of ironwood.

== Geography ==
The region is located in the river basin of the Río Moctezuma between two extensions of the Sierra Madre Occidental mountains. The climate is dry with an average annual temperature of 12.2°C.

== Economic activity ==
Agriculture and cattle raising are the main economic activities. Corn and beans are raised for subsistence while grasses (sorghum, alfalfa, ryegrass) are grown for cattle fodder. The cattle herd numbered 32,554 head in 2000 making cattle raising the main economic activity in the municipality.

The former gold-mine La Bambolla is located near Moctezuma, one of the most famous geological deposits of elementary tellurium and its minerals.
