= Divisaderos Municipality =

Divisaderos
- Municipality
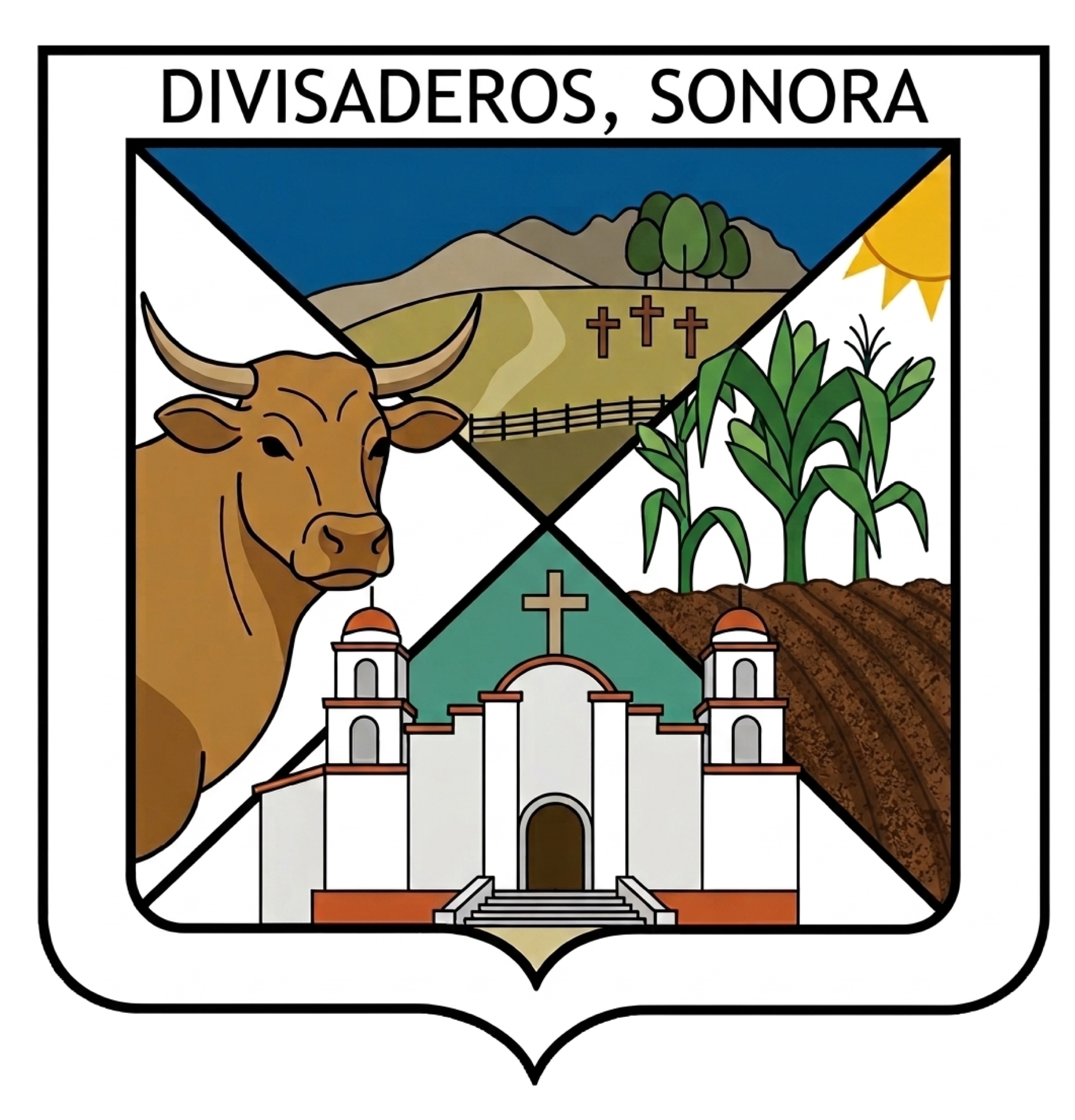
- Coat of arms

- Location of the municipality in Sonora
- Coordinates: 29°36′N 109°28′W
- Country: Mexico
- State: Sonora
- Seat: Divisaderos

Population (2020)
  - Total: 753
- Time zone: UTC-7 (Zona Pacífico)

Divisaderos is a municipality in the state of Sonora in north-western Mexico. The municipal seat is at Divisaderos.

The area of the municipality is 617.69 km^{2}, and the population was 681 inhabitants in 2005, a decrease from the 825 inhabitants counted in the 2000 census. In the 2020 census, it reported a population of 753.
