= Divisaderos =

Town in Sonora, Mexico

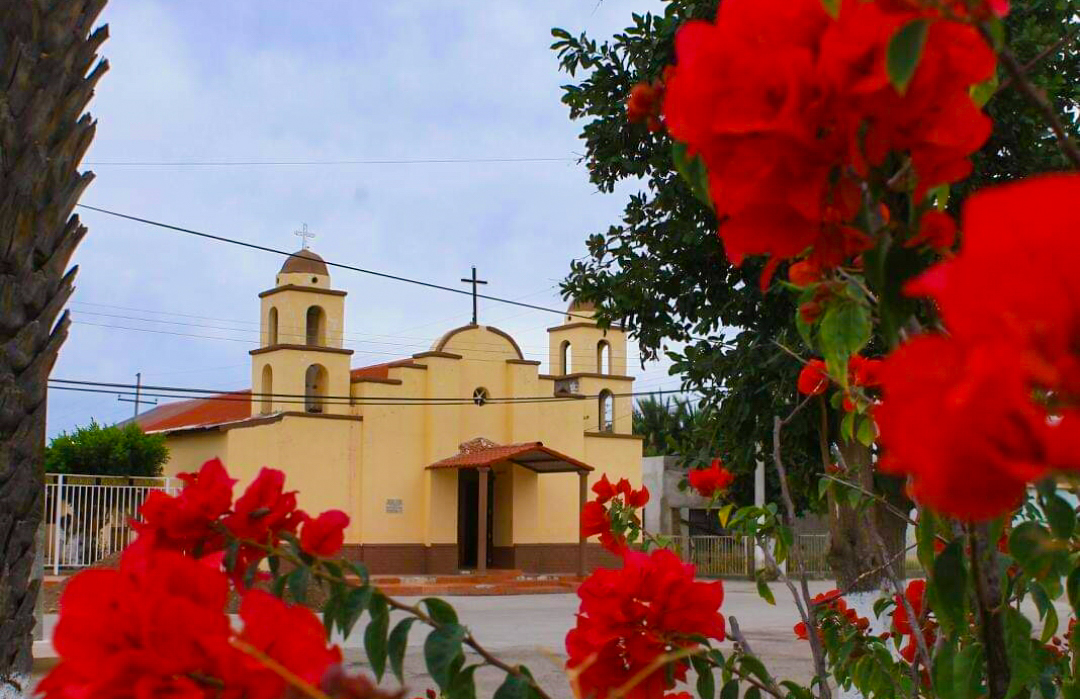
Nuestra Señora del Carmen, Divisaderos

Divisaderos the municipal seat of Divisaderos Municipality of the Mexican state of Sonora. It is located at 29°36′N 109°28′W, about 20 mi/30 km SE of Moctezuma. Access is by paved road to Moctezuma and Tepache. Almost all he inhabitants live in the municipal seat, which lies at an elevation of 850 m.

== Economy ==
The economy is based on subsistence agriculture of corn and beans as well as cattle-raising, especially to export of calves to the United States.

== Sources and external links ==
- Divisaderos, Ayuntamiento Digital (Official Website of Divisaderos, Sonora)
- MUNICIPIO DE DIVISADEROS
- DIVISADEROS: BASIC INFORMATION (in English)
