= Nácori Chico =

Town in Sonora, Mexico

Coordinates: 29°41′N 108°58′W

Nácori Chico is a small town in Nácori Chico Municipality in the east of the Mexican state of Sonora.

== Area and population ==
The municipal seat had a population of 999 in 2000. It is located at an elevation of 900 meters.

== Geography ==
The land is mountainous and is part of the spurs of the Sierra Madre Occidental mountains. There are only small streams which are tributaries of the Rio Yaqui.

== History ==
The region now occupied by the municipality was once the land of the Opata people. The name of Nácori comes from the Opata language and means place of the nopal cactus.

It was founded in 1645 by the Spanish missionary Cristóbal García with the name of Nuestra Señora de Nácori Chico; it became a municipality in its own right in 1934.

In 1886, Mexican Army militia fought Americans and Apaches sixty miles southeast of the town in an incident known as the Crawford Affair. American Captain Emmet Crawford was killed in the battle.

== Economic activity ==
The main economic activities are agriculture, cattle raising, and forestry. The main crops are corn, beans and grasses for cattle fodder. There were 33,000 head of cattle in 2000.

Nácori Chico is also famous in Sonora for its palm hats. See
