= Bacanora, Sonora =

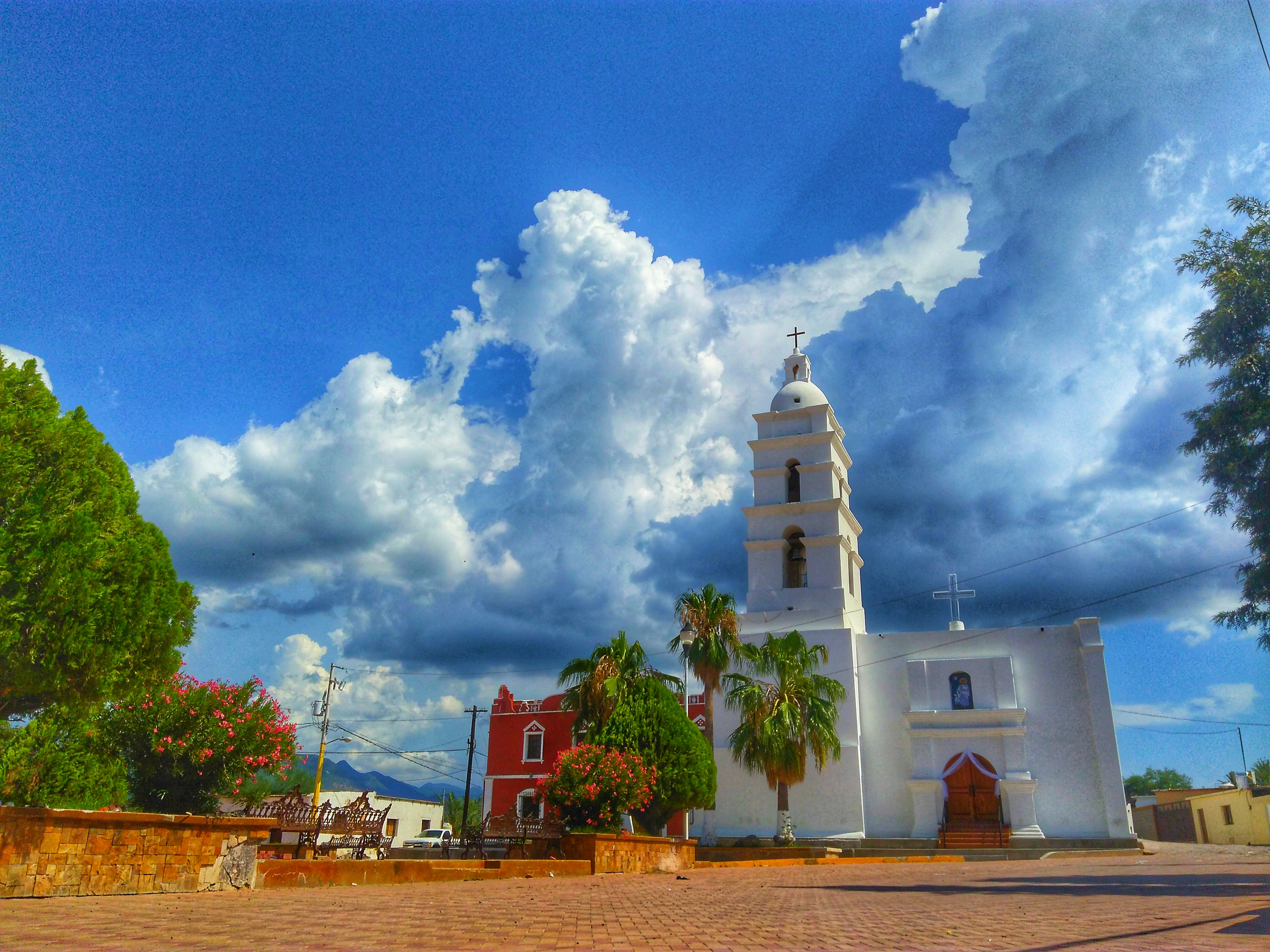
Bacanora church

Bacanora is a small town in Bacanora Municipality in the east of the Mexican state of Sonora. It is located at the geographical coordinates of 28°59′N 109°24′W.

== Area and population ==
The area of the municipality (rural and urban) is 903.17 km^{2}. The population of the municipality was 759 inhabitants in 2020, with 598 residing in the municipal seat (2020 census).

== History and origin of the name ==
Originally this territory was inhabited by the Opata Joba Indians; in 1627 the Jesuit missionary Pedro Méndez established Mission San Ignacio Bacanora. Its name is derived from the Opata language, from the roots "baca", meaning reed, and "nora" meaning slope of reeds. Bacanora became a municipality in 1932.

== Geography ==
Most of the region lies in the foothills of the Sierra Madre Occidental. The Bacanora River crosses the area from south to north and flows into the Yaqui River, which flows across the northern region of the municipality. The town lies at an elevation of 1,030 meters above sea level.

The fauna in the region is still relatively numerous with deer, puma, owls, coyote, jaguar, lynx, raccoons, skunks, eagles, to name a few, present.

The region has been losing population due to immigration to the United States. Since 1995 the population has decreased 3.39%.

== Economy ==
The economy is heavily dependent on cattle raising. There were approximately 17,000 head in 2000. The percentage of the population living in poverty in one of the highest in the state, as a consequence of the land belonging to a few landowners and the majority of the workers working as day workers.

Agriculture is modest with some production of corn, beans, and sorghum.

Agave is planted to produce the regionally famous Aguardiente de Bacanora.

== Communications ==
There is a tarmacked road linking Bacanora with the state capital Hermosillo, which lies at a distance of 181 km.

== Tourist attractions ==
In the village the main tourist attraction is the mission church of San Ignacio de Loyola, built in the seventeenth century.

== Sources consulted ==
- INEGI
- Enciclopedia de los Municipios de Mexico
- Gobierno de Sonora: Bacanora

Specific
