= Santa Ana Municipality, Sonora =

Coordinates: 30.5118°N 111.1234°W

Santa Ana
- Municipality
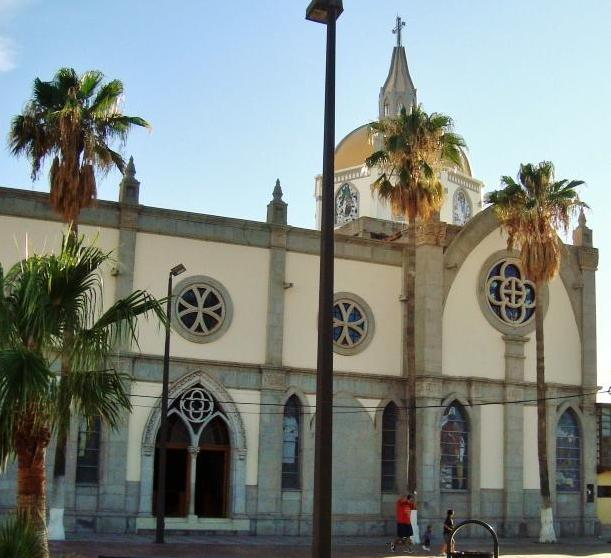
- Saint Mary of Guadalupe Church, Santa Ana

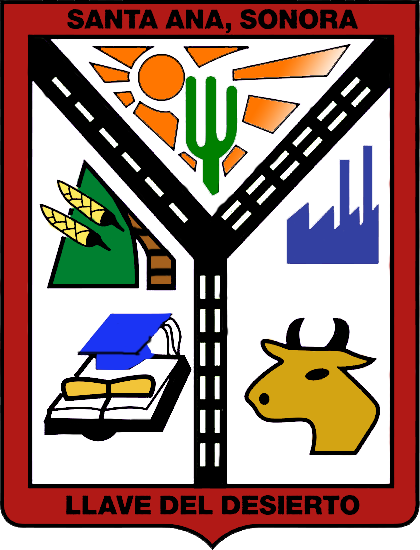
- Coat of arms

- Location of the municipality in Sonora
- Country: Mexico
- State: Sonora
- Seat: Santa Ana, Sonora
- Time zone: UTC–07:00 (Zona Pacífico)

Santa Ana is a municipality in the state of Sonora in north-western Mexico.

The area of the municipality is 1,620.65 km^{2} (625.74 sq mi) and the population was 14,638 in 2005.

The municipal seat is at Santa Ana, Sonora.
