= La Colorada Municipality =

La Colorada Municipio de La Colorada
- Municipality
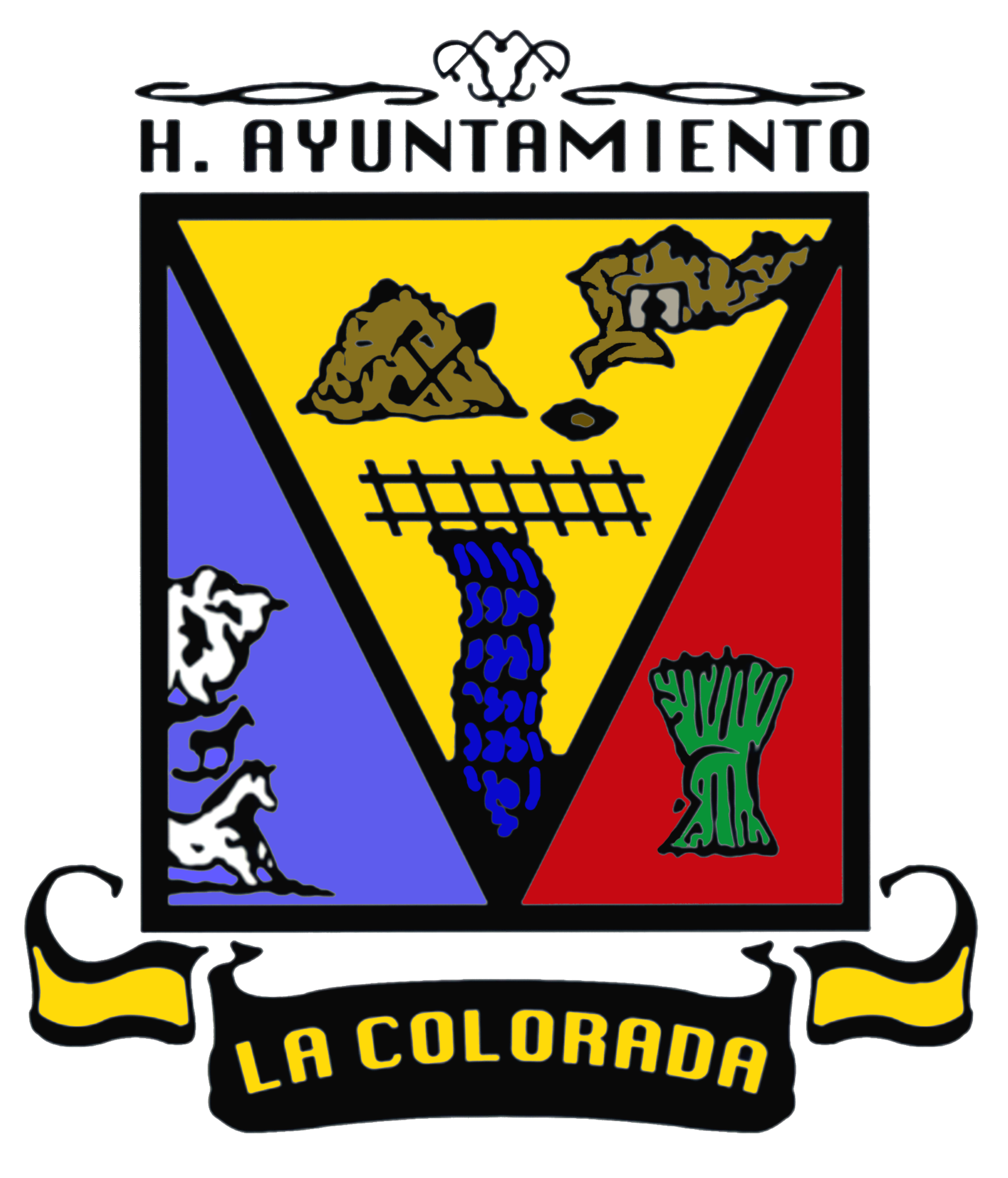
- Coat of arms

- Location of the municipality in Sonora

- Location in Sonora Location in Mexico
- Coordinates: 28°45′13.68″N 110°24′7.56″W
- Country: Mexico
- State: Sonora
- Seat: La Colorada
- Time zone: UTC-7 (Zona Pacífico)

La Colorada is a municipality in the state of Sonora in northwestern Mexico, being the least densely populated municipality in Sonora. The Los Horcones planned community is located within the municipality.
