= Huachinera =

Coordinates: 30°12′N 108°57′W

Huachinera is the municipal seat of Huachinera Municipality in the northeast of the Mexican state of Sonora. The municipal area is 1,184.86 km^{2} (457.48 sq mi), with a population of 1,147 registered in 2000.

It was founded as Juan Evangelista de Huachinera in 1645 by the Spanish missionary Cristóbal García. The land now occupied by the municipality was once the home of the Ópata Indians.

== Geography ==
The land is mainly mountainous, and the main settlement lies at an elevation of 814 meters (2,671 ft). Peaks reach the height of 2,700 meters (8,900 ft). The average annual temperature is 16.9 °C (62.4 °F) and the average annual rainfall is 427.0 mm (16.81 in).

Agriculture and cattle raising are the two main economic activities. Corn and beans are raised for subsistence while grasses are grown for cattle fodder. The cattle herd had 15,457 head in 2000, and calves are exported to the United States. There is one mine, Santa Gertrudis, which has brought employment to the region.
