= San Pedro de la Cueva =

Coordinates: 29.2833°N 109.733°W

- Interactive map of San Pedro de la Cueva
- Country: Mexico
- State: Sonora
- Municipality: San Pedro de la Cueva
- Time zone: UTC-7 (Pacific (US Mountain))

San Pedro de la Cueva is a town in San Pedro de la Cueva Municipality, in the Mexican state of Sonora. It is located in the center of the state at an elevation of 500 meters.

The main economic activities are fishing (in El Novillo lake), cattle raising (20,000 head in 2005), agriculture (wheat, rye, oats, and corn), and incipient industries.
