= Mazatán, Sonora =

Coordinates: 29°01′N 110°08′W

Mazatán is a locality in Mazatán Municipality in the center of the Mexican state of Sonora.

== History ==
The settlement of Mazatán was founded in the seventeenth century by the Jesuit Juan Nentuig. Its name comes from the Opata language and means "place of deer". During the nineteenth century Mazatán belonged to the district of Ures. It became a municipality on 10 December 1907.

== Geography ==
The region is part of the valleys of the center of the state. The average annual temperature is 21.7°C and the average annual rainfall is 508.8 mm.

The region is crossed by the Rio Mazatán, which has an extension of 160 kilometers and flows into the Punta de Agua reservoir near Guaymas.

=== Climate ===
Climate data for Mazatán, Sonora (1991–2020 normals, extremes 1961–present)
Month	Jan	Feb	Mar	Apr	May	Jun	Jul	Aug	Sep	Oct	Nov	Dec	Year
Record high °C (°F)	37 (99)	40 (104)	42 (108)	47 (117)	47 (117)	49 (120)	47 (117)	45 (113)	45 (113)	43.5 (110.3)	42 (108)	37 (99)	49 (120)
Mean daily maximum °C (°F)	25.1 (77.2)	26.1 (79.0)	28.7 (83.7)	32.0 (89.6)	35.6 (96.1)	39.2 (102.6)	36.9 (98.4)	35.8 (96.4)	35.5 (95.9)	33.6 (92.5)	29.2 (84.6)	24.4 (75.9)	31.8 (89.2)
Daily mean °C (°F)	15.5 (59.9)	16.2 (61.2)	18.2 (64.8)	20.7 (69.3)	24.3 (75.7)	29.1 (84.4)	29.2 (84.6)	28.5 (83.3)	27.5 (81.5)	23.8 (74.8)	19.2 (66.6)	15.1 (59.2)	22.3 (72.1)
Mean daily minimum °C (°F)	6.0 (42.8)	6.3 (43.3)	7.6 (45.7)	9.5 (49.1)	13.0 (55.4)	19.0 (66.2)	21.5 (70.7)	21.2 (70.2)	19.5 (67.1)	14.0 (57.2)	9.1 (48.4)	5.8 (42.4)	12.7 (54.9)
Record low °C (°F)	−11 (12)	−8 (18)	−6.6 (20.1)	−4 (25)	0 (32)	6.5 (43.7)	10 (50)	11.4 (52.5)	8.1 (46.6)	0 (32)	−7.2 (19.0)	−8.2 (17.2)	−11 (12)
Average precipitation mm (inches)	20.2 (0.80)	19.7 (0.78)	14.7 (0.58)	2.6 (0.10)	3.4 (0.13)	19.8 (0.78)	144.0 (5.67)	124.5 (4.90)	72.9 (2.87)	17.6 (0.69)	21.0 (0.83)	24.6 (0.97)	485.0 (19.09)
Average rainy days	2.2	2.6	1.4	0.5	0.4	2.6	13.0	10.5	6.4	2.4	2.1	2.6	46.7
Source: Servicio Meteorológico Nacional

== Economy ==
Agriculture and cattle raising are the main economic activities.

Corn and beans are raised for subsistence while grasses (sorghum, alfalfa, rye grass) are grown for cattle fodder.

The cattle herd numbered 17,132 head in 2000 making cattle raising the main economic activity in the municipality. There were 221 producers listed in the last census of 2000.

== Tourist attractions ==
The town church and the dance of the fans in August.
