= Tepache, Sonora =

Town in Mexico

Coordinates: 29°31′N 109°31′W

Tepache is a small town in Tepache Municipality in the east of the Mexican state of Sonora. Its location by GPS coordinates is at: Longitude (dec): -109.528889; Latitude (dec): 29.533333.

On the 20th June 2024, Tepache tied Mexico's all time high temperature record with a reading of 52^C.

== History ==
Tepache, founded in 1678 under the name of Nuestra Señora de San Joaquín y Santa Ana de Depache (Our Lady of Saint Joachim and Saint Anne of Depache). The location was an Opata settlement located in a small valley about one league ( 2.594 miles) long. The word Tepache comes from the Opata language Tepatzi, that later became Tepachi and Tepache, and means, according to some, "Place of Beautiful Women". Deposits of Silver were discovered by the Spanish in the vicinity of Tepache, and worked beginning in 1660. Among the mines worked at Tepache Arroyo were Nacatovori, Lampazos, Las Guijas, Santo Domingo, and Coronilla (none of the mines remained active by 1764). Tepache was visited on January 8, 1686, by mining inspector D. Gabriel de Isturiz, at which time it had 142 families, and 388 residents. The major part of Tepache, along with the side the river bank, was covered by a flood of the River in 1932, and a new settlement was developed above the river bank, with straight and wide streets. Tepache was incorporated as a municipality in 1932. On 22 June 2024, Tepache recorded one of Mexico's hottest ever recorded temperatures, reaching 52.0 °C (125.6 °F).

== Economy ==
Agriculture and livestock raising are the main economic activities.

=== Agriculture ===
Water infrastructure in support of agriculture includes 26 dams and 85 wells. There is an area of 115 hectares of land supported by an irrigation channel, with a length of 10.4 km., with 4.2 km. of the length in lined channel. There are also 882 hectares of temporary cultivation, and 551 hectares of mixed or medium irrigation. Agricultural production is for domestic consumption, and to support livestock. The major crops under cultivation include maize, beans, wheat, potato, sweet potato, chili, and various fruits. Other cultivation is pasture for livestock feed.

=== Livestock raising ===
Livestock raising is defined as providing the backbone of the economy for the municipality. There were 13,016 head of cattle in 2000. Production of pigs and goats is minimal.

== Tourism ==
The municipality is located within the Malpais ("Bad Country") volcanic zone, with huge rocks, canyons, and hills of dark stone, covered by abundant vegetation.

The volcano Volcán Cerro Blanco, is a natural cone 7 kilometers south of Tepache, and is visited by domestic and foreign tourists, as well as by geology students. It is located at Latitude 29.6031200, and Longitude -109.5259500.

Espinazo del Diablo is a natural rock formation nearby, that rises jaggedly into the sky like the backbone of the Devil.

La Gruta Profunda is a Cave located in the Malpais, a few kilometers from town, and is surrounded by canyons, and has within it the Tapón Sifón, a deep pool of blue-green water.

El Pantano (The Swamp) is another area visited by residents and visitors. It is a swampy area located in the mountains about 8 kilometers from the town. Here, a spring of water rises up from deep underground, creating an area of mud and quicksand.

== Culture ==
On October 15 the patron saint festival of Saint Teresa of Ávila is celebrated, with dances, fireworks, music, dances and a popular fair.

== Government ==
=== Characterization of the municipal government ===
The City Council consists of a municipal president, a trustee, three general aldermen, and two aldermen providing proportional representation of the population.

==== Timeline of Municipal Presidents ====
Municipal President	Year began Term	Year Ended Term
Jesús Sánchez Ortiz	1932	1934
Jesús Ortiz	1934	1937
Manuel Galindo	1937	1940
Raymundo Dávila Dávila	1940	1943
José Pedro Cadena Galindo	1943	1946
Juan Moreno García	1946	1949
Rafael Galindo Acuña	1949	1952
José Cadena Acuña	1952	1955
Eusebio Montaño Dávila	1955	1958
Francisco Sánchez Dávila	1958	1961
José Griego Rodríguez	1961	1964
Manuel Cadena Velarde	1964	1967
Jesús Velarde García	1967	1970
Victoriano Dávila Montaño	1970	1973
Filiberto Moreno Blanco	1973	1976
Eduardo Velarde Márquez	1976	1979
Humberto Quintana Vázquez	1979	1982
Cristóbal Moreno Montaño	1982	1985
Francisco Blanco Vázquez	1985	1988
Luis Ernesto Pérez Moreno	1988	1991
Jacinto Galindo Montaño	1991	1994
Raymundo Dávila Moreno	1994	1997
Juan Montaño Velarde	1997	2000
José Martínez Cadena	2000	2003
Profr. Benjamín Durazo Mayboca	2003	2006
Tomas Garcia Andrade	2006	2009
