= Sahuaripa Municipality =

Coordinates: 28.9376°N 108.9706°W

Sahuaripa
- Municipality
- Coat of arms
- Interactive map of Sahuaripa
- Country: Mexico
- State: Sonora
- Seat: Sahuaripa
- Time zone: UTC-7 (Zona Pacífico)

Sahuaripa is a municipality in the state of Sonora in north-western Mexico. The municipal seat is at Sahuaripa.
