= Suaqui Grande =

Coordinates: 28°24′N 109°54′W

- Interactive map of Suaqui Grande
- Country: Mexico
- State: Sonora
- Municipality: Suaqui Grande
- Founded: 1620

Government
  - Mayor: Antonio Salgado
- Time zone: UTC-7 (Pacific (US Mountain))

Suaqui Grande is a town in Suaqui Grande Municipality, in the eastern region of the Mexican state of Sonora. It was founded in 1620 by the Jesuit missionary Martín Burgencio as San Ignacio de Suaqui.

== Economy ==
The main economic activities are cattle raising, growing of grass for cattle feed and subsistence agriculture.
