= Villa Pesqueira =

- Town and Municipality
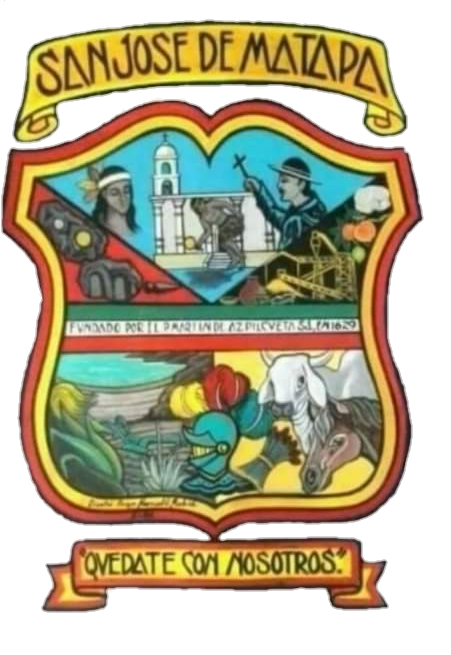
- Coat of arms

- Location within Sonora Location within Mexico
- Coordinates: 29°06′N 109°57′W
- Country: Mexico
- State: Sonora
- Founded: 1629

Government
  - Mayor: Rafael del Castillo Ortiz
- Elevation: 634 m (2,080 ft)
- Time zone: UTC-7 (Zona Pacífico)

Villa Pesqueira is a town, and the surrounding municipality of the same name, in the central region of the Mexican state of Sonora.

== Municipal seat ==
It was founded in 1629 by the missionary Martín de Azpilcueta as (San José de) Mátapa. The State Congress ordered the change to its current name, at the inhabitants' request, on 11 February 1867.

== History ==
The municipality was created on 11 December 1930, with the division of its territory from the adjacent municipality of Ures.

== Area ==
The municipal area is 1,834.13 km^{2}.

== Population ==
The population was 1,590, of whom 96% lived in the urban area.

== Economy ==
The main economic activities are cattle raising (18,000 head in 2005), subsistence farming, and mining.
