= Javier Gándara Magaña =

Mexican politician

Municipal president of Hermosillo
- In office 16 September 2009 – 16 September 2012
- Preceded by: Ernesto Gándara Camou
- Succeeded by: Alejandro López Caballero

Personal details
- Born: 23 November 1944 (age 81) Hermosillo, Sonora, Mexico
- Party: PRI (former); PAN
- Spouse: Marcela Fernández de Gándara (m. 1972; died 2022)
- Children: 6
- Education: ITAM
- Occupation: Businessman

Javier Gándara Magaña (born 23 November 1944) is a Mexican businessman and politician. He is a member of the National Action Party (PAN). He served as the municipal president of Hermosillo from 2009 to 2012 and was the PAN nominee in the 2015 Sonora gubernatorial election, where he was defeated by Claudia Pavlovich.

== Early life and business career ==
Gándara Magaña was born on 23 November 1944 in Hermosillo, Sonora. He graduated from the Instituto Tecnológico Autónomo de México (ITAM) with a degree in business administration.

Gándara Magaña began his business career at Autos Kino S.A. He joined the board of the parent company Gemso. In 1997 he created Grupo Ganfer, a business group composed of agricultural industries, commercial and real estate businesses. Grupo Ganfer became one of the most important business groups in northeast Mexico, encompassing food companies, franchises, greenhouses, agricultural and real estate businesses. He was recognized as Businessman of the Year in 1992, Economic Promoter of Sonora in 2000, and Industria Maquiladora de Sonora.

== Political career ==
Gándara Magaña first ran for public office in 2000 under the Institutional Revolutionary Party (PRI) banner, losing the race for municipal president of Hermosillo to the National Action Party (PAN) candidate Francisco Búrquez Valenzuela. He then switched his party affiliation to the PAN. In the 2003 and 2006 elections, he lost in the PAN primaries for municipal president.

Gándara Magaña served as the municipal president of Hermosillo from 2009 to 2012. In February 2015, he was announced as the PAN nominee for the upcoming Sonora gubernatorial election after defeating Francisco García Gámez in the primary election. Gándara Magaña failed to attend a debate with the PRI nominee, Claudia Pavlovich, the following month. The PRI accused him of corruption during his term as municipal president, including selling 30 hectares of municipal land to the PAN Sonora president, Juan Valencia Durazo, at a price of MXN$2 million when it was valued at MXN$35 million.

In the general election, Gándara Magaña lost to Pavlovich, who received 486,944 votes to his 486,944 votes.

== Philanthropy ==
In 1991 Gándara Magaña and his wife Marcela Fernández de Gándara, created a program called "One Step at a Time", the first program of the Ganfer Foundation, a private organisation that supports young people and the prevention of alcohol and drug addiction, support for women, youngsters and girls for their overall development.

It supports indigenous groups in Sonora, offering special support for young people with grants for study and sports projects as well as people with disabilities and seniors. Programs include "Ganfer Fleamarket" (El Mercadito Ganfer), offer subsidized commodities in places where impoverished families live and "Entrepreneur Challenge" (Desafío Emprendedor), a competitive program to promote Sonoran entrepreneurial talent together with Angel Ventures of México. The latter competition was won by a system to convert conventional television sets to smart televisions.

== Personal life ==
Gándara Magaña married Marcela Fernández de Gándara on 24 September 1972 and they remained together until her death on 2 December 2022. They raised six children: Javier, Luisa Alejandra, Germán, Ana Marcela, Gerardo and Adreana.

== See also ==
- List of municipal presidents of Hermosillo
