= Granados =

Granados may refer to:

== Places ==
- Granados, Baja Verapaz, Guatemala
- Granados, Sonora, Mexico
  - Granados Municipality, Sonora

== People ==
- Enrique Granados (1867–1916), Spanish composer
- Federico Tinoco Granados (1870–1931), president of Costa Rica
- Jorge García Granados (1900–1961), politician and diplomat from Guatemala
- Miguel García Granados (1809–1878), president of Guatemala
- Steven Granados-Portelance (born 1987), Canadian drag queen
