= Francisco Búrquez =

Mexican politician

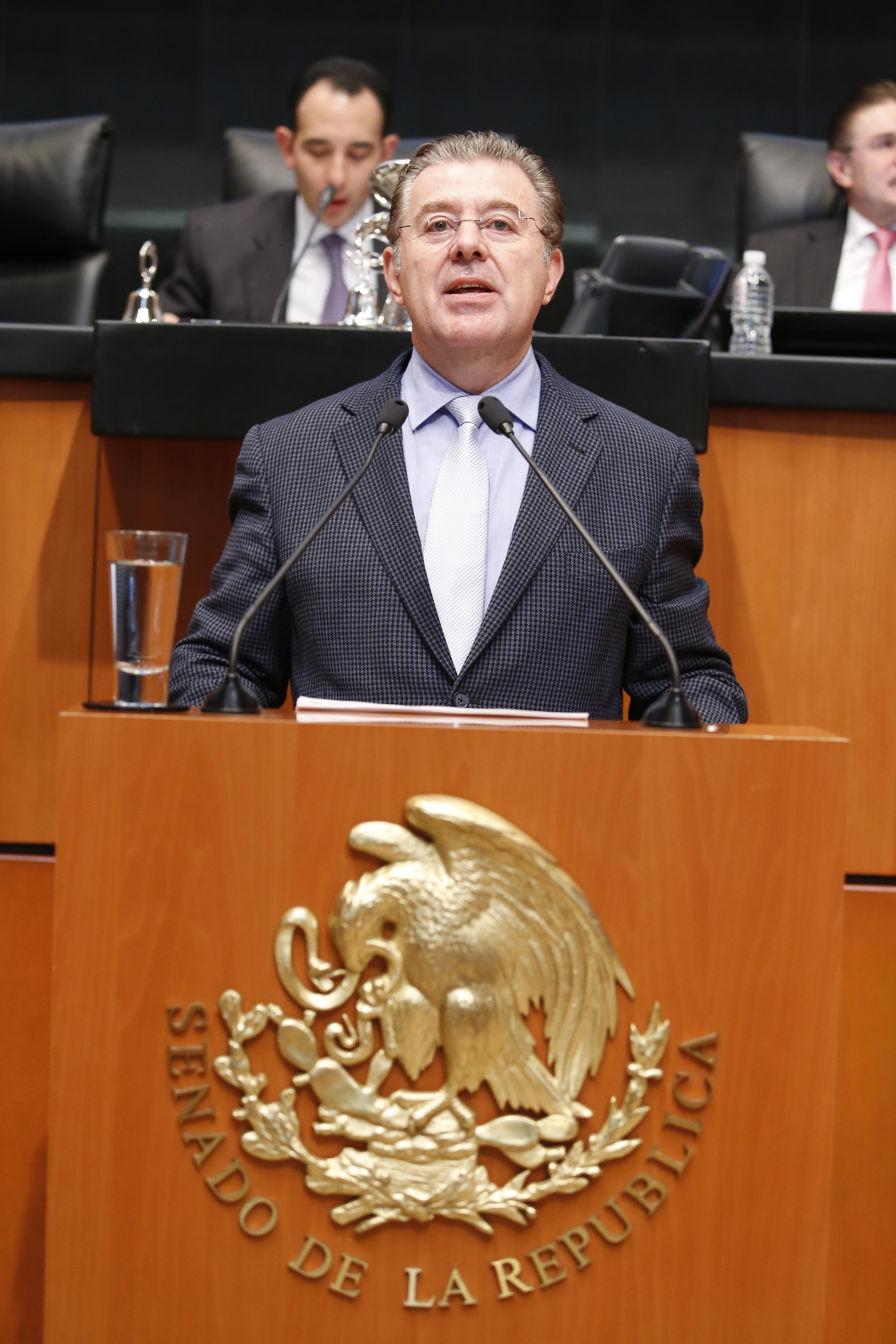

Member of the Senate for Sonora
- In office 1 September 2012 – 31 August 2018
- Preceded by: Alfonso Elías Serrano

President of the Urban Development Commission in the Senate
- In office 1 September 2012 – 31 August 2018
- Preceded by: Yeidckol Polevnsky

Municipal president of Hermosillo
- In office 16 September 2000 – 15 September 2003
- Preceded by: Jorge Eduardo Valencia Juillerat
- Succeeded by: María Dolores del Río

Personal details
- Born: 6 June 1958 (age 68) Hermosillo, Mexico
- Party: PAN
- Education: Instituto Tecnológico de Estudios Superiores de Monterrey; Instituto Panamericano de Alta Dirección de Empresas
- Website: Official website

Francisco "Pancho" Búrquez Valenzuela (born 6 June 1958) is a Mexican politician and was member of the National Action Party (PAN) until his resignation in 2018. He is a senator in the LXIII Legislature of the Mexican Congress representing Sonora.

== Life ==
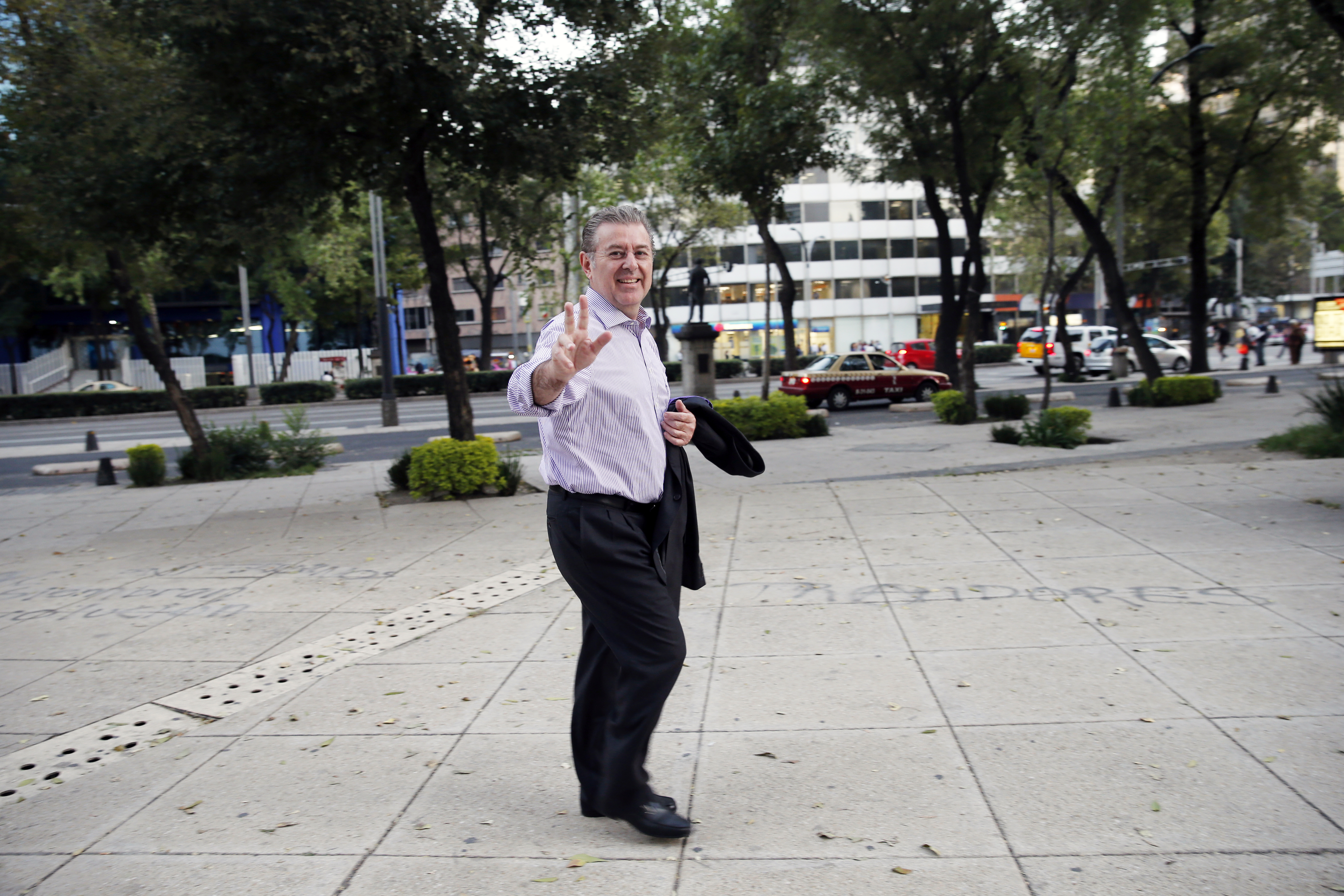
Búrquez in 2015

Búrquez was born in Hermosillo and earned his degree in industrial engineering at Tec de Monterrey, as well as a master's degree in high business administration from the IPADE. In the 1980s and 1990s, he directed various businesses. In 1994, he became president of the Northwest Delegation of COPARMEX.

His political career in the PAN began in 1997. He was elected the municipal president of Hermosillo in 2000. In his three-year term, he was honored with a national anticorruption award from the CIDE. Between 2003 and 2005, he served as president, of the PAN party in the state of Sonora.

He won election to the Senate for the LXII and LXIII Legislatures in 2012. He presides over the Urban Development and Land Use Commission in the Senate and also sits on the Science and Technology, Commerce and Industrial Development, and Energy Commissions.

On 28 August 2018, three days before leaving office, Búrquez renounced the PAN and stated that he no longer identified with any party.

Preceded by Jorge Eduardo Valencia Juillerat	Municipal President of Hermosillo, Sonora; 2000 - 2003	Succeeded by María Dolores del Río
