= Héctor Cáñez Ríos =

Mexican politician

Municipal president of Caborca
- In office 2003–2006
- Preceded by: Jorge Trevor Pino
- Succeeded by: Hernán Méndez Oros

Member of the Congress of Sonora from the 3rd district
- In office 2000–2003
- Preceded by: Júlio Alfonso Martínez Romero
- Succeeded by: Luis Alberto Cañez Lizarraga

Personal details
- Citizenship: Mexican
- Party: PAN
- Education: Universidad de Sonora
- Occupation: accountant

Héctor Cáñez Ríos is a Mexican accountant and politician representing the National Action Party (PAN). He served in the LVI Legislature of the Congress of Sonora from 2000 to 2003.

== Biography ==
Cáñez Ríos is a native of Pitiquito, Sonora. He earned a Licentiate in public accounting from the Universidad de Sonora in 1991, and worked as an accountant. When the Colegio de Contadores Públicos de Sonora (College of Public Accountants of Sonora) established its first auxiliary branch in Caborca in 1992, Cáñez Ríos served as its first president.

In the 2000 state elections, Cáñez Ríos won a seat representing the 3rd district in the LVI Legislature of the Congress of Sonora. He obtained 49 percent of the vote while his closest opponent from the Institutional Revolutionary Party (PRI) received 42 percent.

In the 2003 state elections, Cáñez Ríos was elected as the municipal president of Caborca with 12,380 votes, or 57.5 percent of the valid votes cast. In March 2004, he and María Dolores del Río, the Hermosillo municipal president, were the only two out of 72 municipalities in the state who did not sign a public works agreement under the controversial Participación Social Sonorense (Pasos; Sonoran Social Participation) program, in which citizens would serve as "watchdogs" of public works projects. During his tenure, Cáñez Ríos dealt with a water crisis which severely affected the heavily agriculture-based economy of Caborca, and continued the diversification of the local economy toward commerce and hunting tourism.

In January 2006, Cáñez Ríos was accused of protecting municipal police officers after they assaulted a journalist who had accused the department of involvement in drug trafficking. In an open letter, Robert Ménard, the secretary-general of Reporters Without Borders (RSF), asked Eduardo Bours, the Governor of Sonora, to administer the appropriate sanctions on both the police and Cáñez Ríos, who the RSF hoped would "account publicly for his actions".

His brother, Fernando Cáñez Ríos, was a PAN pre-candidate for municipal president of Caborca in 2009; he lost the internal election for the party's nomination to Darío Murillo Bolaños.
