= Plaza Zaragoza =

Square in Hermosillo, Mexico

Coordinates: 29°04′30″N 110°57′33″W

The Plaza Zaragoza in Hermosillo is the main plaza. It is located in the historic centre and is surrounded by important buildings such as the Catedral de la Asunción (Hermosillo's main church), the Palacio de Gobierno (house of the state's executive), and the Palacio Municipal (house of the city's executive). The gazebo in the center of the plaza is seen as a monument of the Mexican independence movement. Since 1958, there has been a tradition of removing the oranges from the trees in the plaza in preparation for celebrating Mexican independence day, a tradition that emerged after oranges were used as projectiles in a labor dispute the year prior.

Another Plaza Zaragoza is also a popular public square in the heart of Monterrey south of the Macroplaza, and features a lighthouse, fountain, and monuments. The park hosts many concerts and special events.
