= Northeast Hermosillo =

Northeast Hermosillo Noreste de Hermosillo
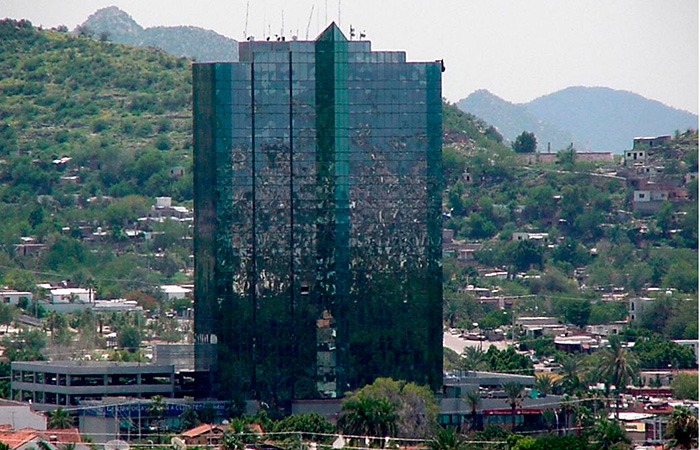
- Hermosillo Tower

- Location in Mexico
- Coordinates: 29°07′36″N 110°57′05″W
- Country: Mexico
- State: Sonora
- Elevation (of seat): 276 m (906 ft)

Population (2005)
  - Total: 160,862
- Time zone: UTC-6 (CST)
- Postal code (of seat): ?
- Area code: 662
- Website: (in Spanish) /Official site

Northeast Hermosillo is an area in the Sonoran capital of Hermosillo. Its borders can be defined where the roads Reforma and Kino join, and so included some recognized neighborhoods such as Balderrama, Modelo, Pitic and La Joya. But also including several residential developments, which had a boom in residential developments in Hermosillo. Commercial centers are mostly found along major important roads like Blvd. Progreso, Blvd. Morelos and Blvd. Kino. Their development is such that many American franchises have invested in these centers.

== City ==
This sector of Hermosillo has minor attractions but has major agglomeration of businesses and stores. This sector of the city has a notable presence of hotels, commercial services and stores; most of which are concentrated in Blvd. Kino and to a lesser extent in Blvd. Morelos.

== Economy ==
This sector’s main economic activity revolves around retail and office based labor.

== Higher education ==
- Tecnológico de Monterrey (ITESM), Campus Sonora Norte
- Universidad del Valle de México (formerly Universidad del Noroeste)
- Universidad TecMilenio, Campus Hermosillo

== Transportation ==
The Mexican Federal Highway 15 crosses the city where it is called Blvd. Kino. Also, a newly built detour at the northern entrance merges into Blvd. Morelos, facilitating access to the city.
