= Célida López Cárdenas =

Mexican politician

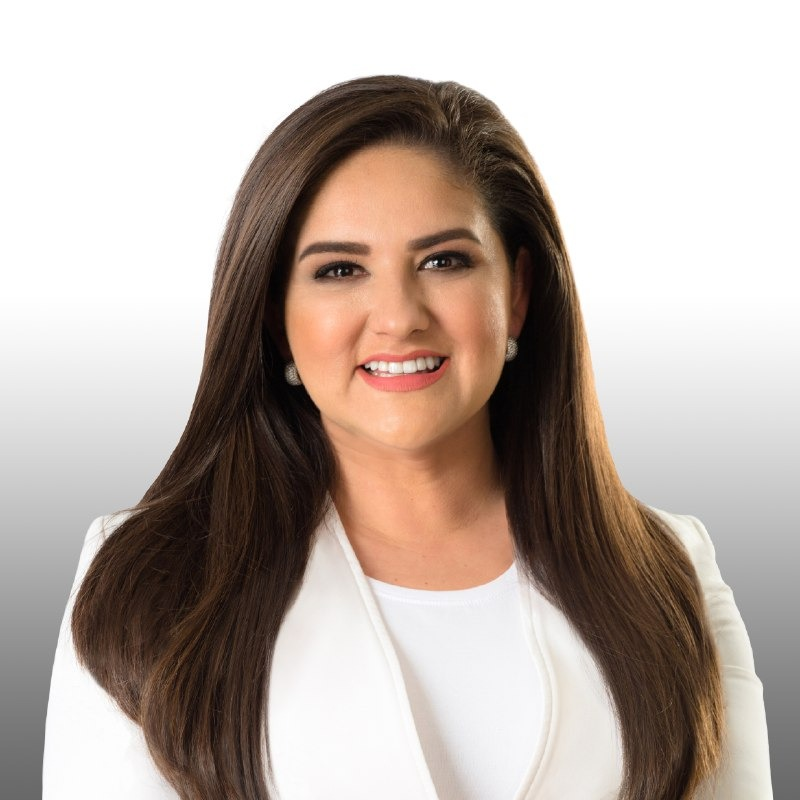
Image of Celida López

Célida Teresa López Cárdenas (born 15 December 1979) is a Mexican politician and law graduate. She was municipal president of Hermosillo for Morena from 2018 to 2021. Former head of the Secretary of Tourism of Sonora, she held the position of Secretary of Agriculture, Livestock, Water Resources, Fisheries, and Aquaculture for the State of Sonora between 2023 and 2026, having previously served as Chief of the Office of the State Executive of Sonora.

She resigned from her public office positions to participate in her party’s internal selection process for the candidacy for governor of Sonora. Lorenia Valles won the process, and López has served as the Coordinator of the Committees for the Defense of the Fourth Transformation in Hermosillo since September 2026.

== Early life and education ==
López Cárdenas was born in Puerto Peñasco, Sonora, on December 15, 1979. She has a master's degree in political science with a specialty in political institutions and processes, as well as an MBA in business management from IPADE.

== Political career ==
=== State politics ===
López Cárdenas chaired the Justice and Human Rights Commission of the LXI Legislature in the State Congress. She was also Undersecretary of Citizen Participation and Institutional Liaison in the Government of the State of Sonora. From 2011 to 2015, she was president of the Sonoran State Participation Board and State Public Relations Coordinator of the Ministry of Health of the Government of Baja California. From 2015 to 2018, she was a local deputy in the LXI Legislature for District II of the State of Sonora representing the National Action Party (PAN).

On 6 September 2021, the Governor of Sonora, Alfonso Durazo, announced that López Cárdenas would serve as Secretary of Tourism in his cabinet.

López Cárdenas sought election as one of Sonora's senators in the 2024 Senate election, occupying the first place on the Labour Party's two-name formula. Their ticket finished in fourth place, with 106,625 votes, representing 9.2%.

=== Municipal president of Hemosillo (2018–2021) ===
In 2018, López Cárdenas ran as Morena's candidate for municipal president of Hermosillo. She was elected, becoming the third woman to serve as municipal president in the city's history. She held the position until 8 April 2021, when she took a leave of absence to run for re-election as mayor of Hermosillo in the 2021 Sonora state elections, marking the first time an incumbent mayor had sought reelection in the capital. On 11 June 2021, after losing her bid for reelection, she returned to conclude her three-year term.

During her term as municipal president, Cárdenas formed a citizen and equal government, the first in the history of the city. She reduced the public debt by 5% for the first time in years in the capital of Sonora. She canceled a multimillion-dollar lighting service concession and held the 2019 Pitic Festival, which broke a record by bringing together more than 60,000 people in an event with artists of quality and international stature.
