= Juan Valencia Durazo =

Mexican politician

Member of the Congress of Sonora Plurinominal
- In office September 2003 – September 2006

Municipal president of Granados
- In office 2000–2003
- Preceded by: Francisco Julio Arvayo Ortíz
- Succeeded by: Edgardo Durazo Durazo

Personal details
- Born: Granados, Sonora, Mexico
- Citizenship: Mexican
- Party: PAN
- Spouse: Silvia María Valenzuela
- Children: 3
- Education: UVM (Lic., MBA)

Juan Bautista Valencia Durazo is a Mexican rancher and politician representing the National Action Party (PAN). He served in the LVII Legislature of the Congress of Sonora from 2003 to 2006.

== Career ==
Valencia was born in the town of Granados, Sonora. A rancher by trade, he served as the municipal president of Granados from 2000 to 2003. In 2002, Valencia was accused of committing fraud with his land and admitted to it. However, the statute of limitations had expired and he avoided any charges. Valencia also claims to have been sued 17 times by Institutional Revolutionary Party (PRI) state legislator Lioncio Durazo Durazo.

Valencia was then designated by the PAN to serve in the LVII Legislature of the Congress of Sonora from 2000 to 2003 via proportional representation. He introduced a bill attempting to regulate felling in the Sierra region he grew up in after noticing its devastating impact on the local vegetation. After his term ended, Valencia served as the state undersecretary of agriculture. He was then elected as the president of the PAN's Sonora branch in 2010, serving in the role until 2015.

Leyva earned a Licentiate in law from the Universidad del Valle de México Hermosillo campus in 2008, followed by a Master of Business Administration from the same institution in 2011.

=== Legal issues ===
In March 2015, the PRI accused the PAN gubernatorial nominee, Javier Gándara Magaña, of having illegally sold 30 hectares of municipal land in Hermosillo to Valencia during Gándara Magaña's term as municipal president. The property was reportedly acquired by Valencia at a price of MXN$2 million when it was valued at approximately MXN$35 million. In April 2018, Sonoran authorities seized properties belonging to Valencia as part of an investigation into corrupt dealings during the administration of former Governor Guillermo Padrés Elías.

Valencia was arrested on 22 June 2018, one week before the Sonora state elections, and jailed for 28 days at the Centro de Readaptación Social 1 de Hermosillo before being released on bail. He had reportedly misappropriated more than MXN$400 million in PAN membership fees that had been deducted from the paychecks of government employees who were party members.

== Personal life ==
Valencia is a Catholic and has three daughters. He cites Carlos Fuentes as his favorite author and Aura as his favorite work.
