= Juan Valencia =

Juan Valencia may refer to:

- Juan Antonio Valencia (born 1929), Salvadoran Olympic sport shooter
- Juan Valencia Durazo, Mexican politician
- Juan David Valencia (born 1986), Colombian footballer
- Juanjo Valencia (born 1971), Spanish footballer
- Juan Pablo Valencia (born 1988), Colombian cyclist
- Juan Manuel Valencia (born 1998), Colombian footballer
