= Manuel Ignacio Acosta Gutiérrez =

Mexican politician

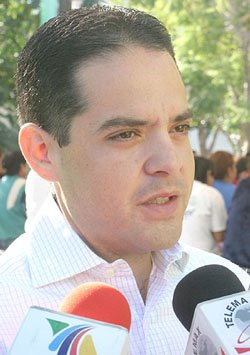
- Born: 4 February 1977 (age 49); Hermosillo, Sonora, Mexico
- Occupation: Politician
- Political party: PRI

Manuel Ignacio Acosta Gutiérrez (born 4 February 1977) is a Mexican politician from the Institutional Revolutionary Party (PRI). From 2009 to 2012, he served as a federal deputy in the 61st Congress, representing Sonora's fifth district.

== See also ==
- List of municipal presidents of Hermosillo
