= Ernesto Gándara Camou =

Mexican politician

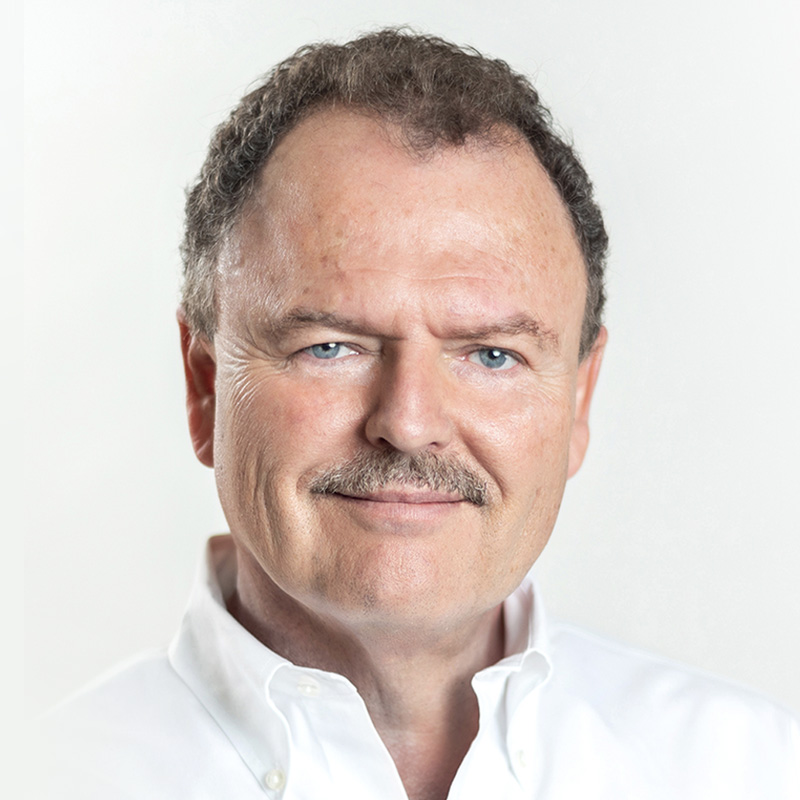
- Born: 22 September 1960 (age 65); Hermosillo, Sonora, Mexico
- Education: UNAM; Panthéon-Assas University
- Occupation: Senator
- Political party: PRI
- Website: http://www.ernestogandara.mx/

Ernesto Gándara Camou (born 22 September 1960) is a Mexican politician affiliated with the PRI. He currently serves as Senator of the LXII Legislature of the Mexican Congress representing Sonora. He also was municipal president of Hermosillo, Sonora from 2006 to 2009.

== See also ==
- List of municipal presidents of Hermosillo
