= Instituto Irlandés Hermosillo =

Coordinates: 29.1074°N 110.9068°W

- Hermosillo, Sonora

Information
- School type: Private School

The Instituto Irlandés Hermosillo is a private school in Hermosillo, Sonora. It serves preschool through bachillerato (senior high school).
