= Hermosillo Municipality =

Hermosillo Municipio de Hermosillo
- Municipality
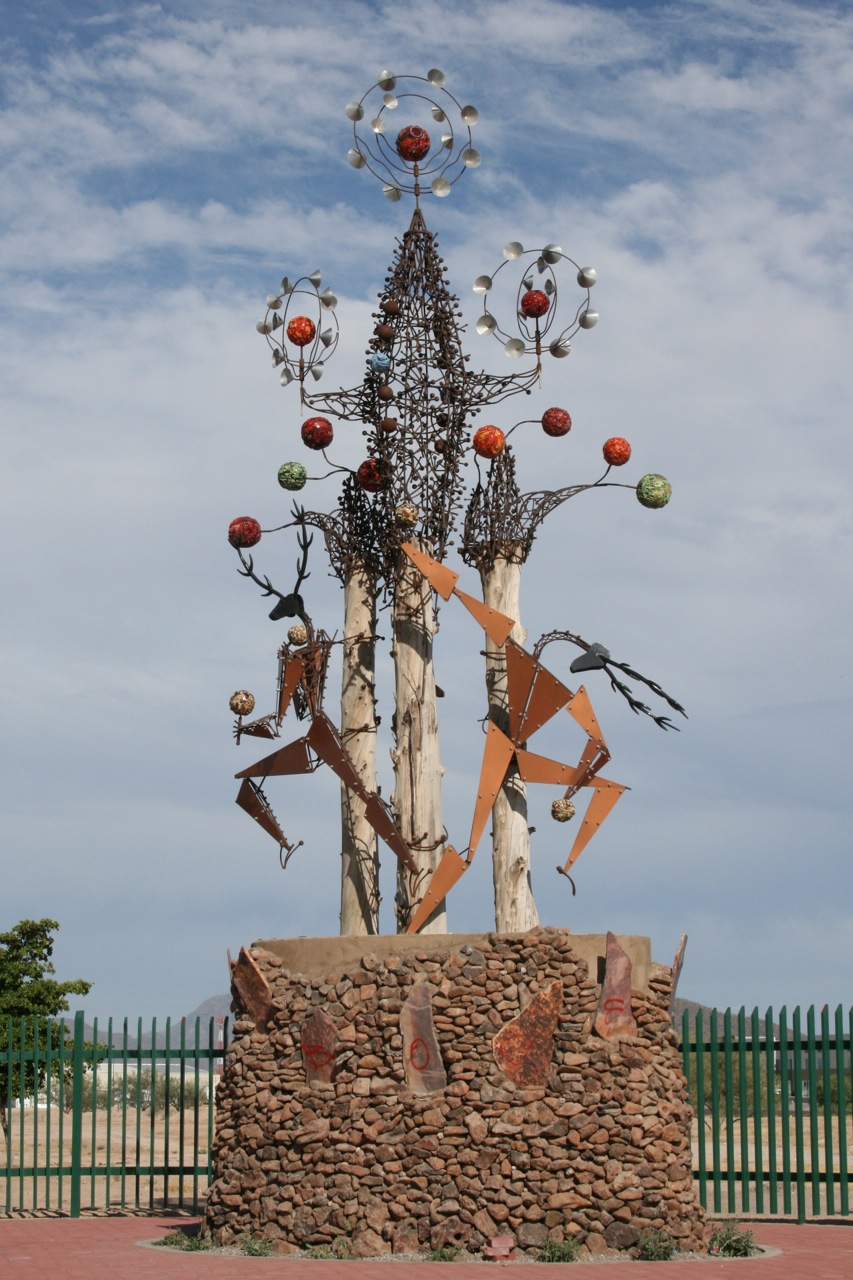
- Desert sculpture at the edge of Hermosillo

- Coat of arms

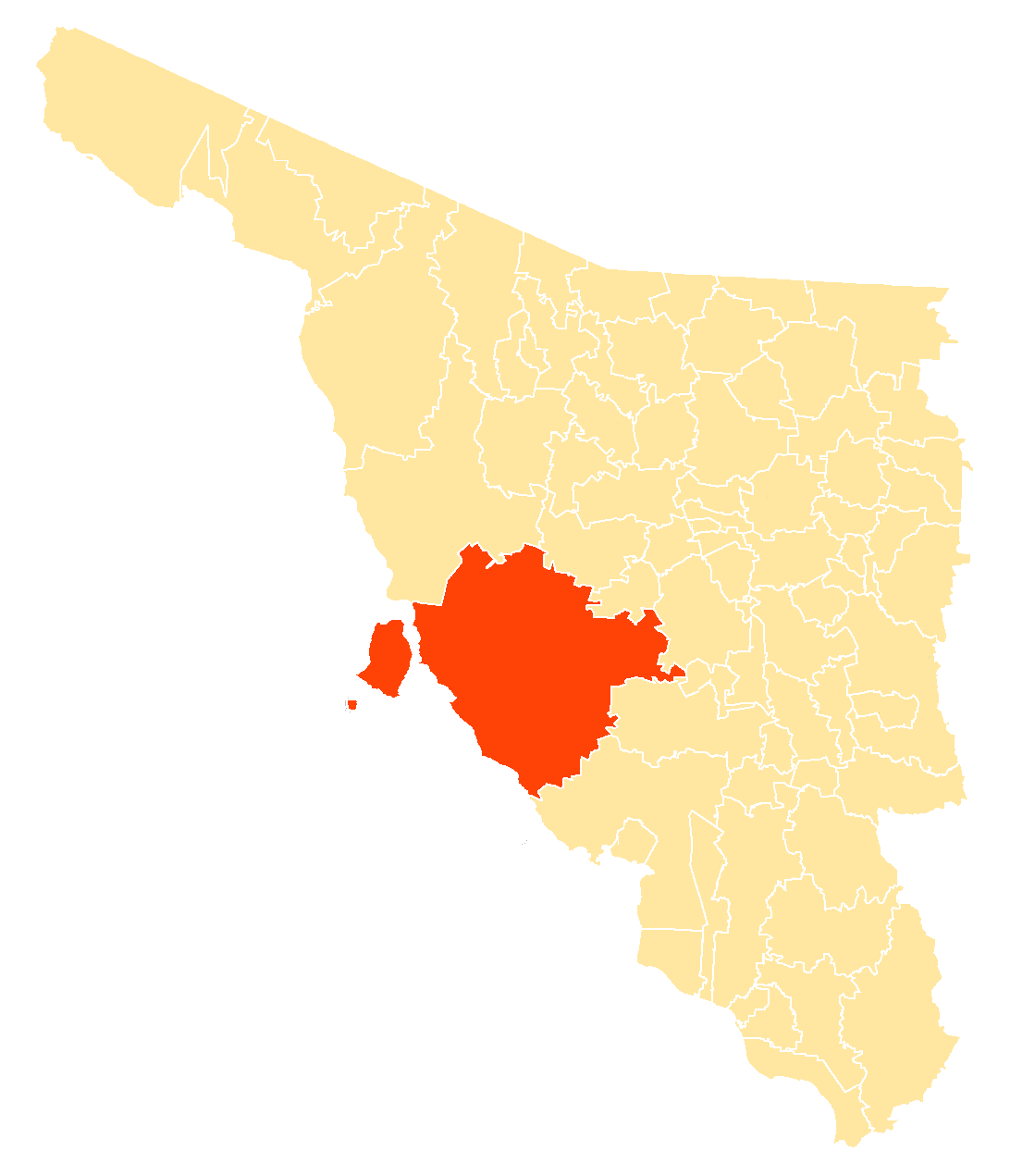
- Location of the municipality in Sonora

- Location in Sonora Location in Mexico
- Coordinates: 28°58′51.24″N 111°12′38.52″W
- Country: Mexico
- State: Sonora
- Seat: Hermosillo

Government
  - Federal electoral district: SON-3 & SON-5

Area
  - Total: 15,720.3 km^{2} (6,069.6 sq mi)

Population (2020 census)
  - Total: 936,263
- Time zone: UTC–07:00 (Zona Pacífico)
- Area code: +52 662

Hermosillo is the largest and most populous municipality in the state of Sonora in northwestern Mexico. The municipal seat is the city of Hermosillo.

As municipal seat, the city of Hermosillo is the local government of over 3,800 other localities, with a combined territory of 14,880.2 km^{2}. Other important communities include Miguel Alemán, San Pedro el Saucito, Bahía Kino, La Victoria and La Manga.

== Geography ==
The municipality borders the municipalities of Carbó, San Miguel de Horcasitas, Ures, Mazatán, La Colorada, Guaymas and Pitiquito, with the Gulf of California to the southwest.

=== Hydrography ===
The municipality is mostly flat with sloping towards the sea. There are isolated mountain peaks that reach to only 300 meters above sea level and include Tepoaca, Bacoachito, Lopez, Tonuco, Seri, Batamote, Goguz, Bronces, SantaTeresa, La Palma, Siete Cerros and La Campana. These are located mostly in the eastern section of the municipality. The two most important rivers are the Rio Sonora and the Rio San Miguel. Both of these are used for irrigation purposes with the Abelardo L. Rodriguez dam located on the San Miguel River. The population increase of the municipality, currently at 2.5% annually puts pressure on the infrastructure of the city, especially its water supply. Decades of overpumping of ground water has led to the aquifer levels being lower than sea levels, and sea water creeping in as an "artificial recharge."

=== Climate ===
The municipality is with two arid climate regions. The first is that next to the sea, which is desert with fairly cold winters and hot summers. The rest of the municipality is very dry desert with larger temperature variations than the coastal area. Temperatures can range from as low as freezing in January and February to 48 °C in July and August. Rains for both climates falls mostly between June and September, with annual precipitation between 75 and 300 millimeters, depending on location.

=== Flora and fauna ===
Most of the vegetation here consists of mesquite trees as well as trees such as the desert ironwood, palo verde and the huisache. Dune vegetation exists at Bahia de Kino. Desert animals such as the desert tortoise, rattlesnakes, bighorn sheep and lynx are the most notable species.

== Government ==
See List of municipal presidents of Hermosillo.
