= Granados Municipality, Sonora =

Granados
- Municipality
- Coat of arms

- Location of Granados in Sonora
- Coordinates: 29°51′43″N 109°18′39″W
- Country: Mexico
- State: Sonora
- Established: 3 December 1862
- Seat: Granados

Government
  - Municipal president: José Vinicio Durazo Durazo

Area
  - Total: 363.9 km^{2} (140.5 sq mi)
- Elevation (of seat): 533 m (1,749 ft)

Population (2020 Census)
  - Total: 1,009
  - Density: 2.773/km^{2} (7.181/sq mi)
  - Seat: 1,009
- Time zone: UTC-7 (Pacífico (no DST))
- Postal code: 84460
- Area code: 634
- Website: Official website

Granados is a municipality in the Mexican state of Sonora, located approximately 180 kilometres (110 mi) northeast of Hermosillo, the state capital. It is named after José Joaquín Granados y Gálvez, the second bishop of Sonora from 1788 to 1794.

== Geography ==
The municipality of Granados lies at an elevation between 400 and 1,900 metres (1,300–6,200 ft) in the Sierra Madre Occidental in eastern Sonora. It borders the municipalities of Huásabas to the north, Bacadéhuachi to the east, Divisaderos to the south, and Moctezuma to the west. The municipality covers an area of 363.9 square kilometres (140.5 sq mi) and comprises 0.2% of the state's area.

Granados lies in the valley of the Bavispe River, which is flanked by the Sierra de Huasabas to the west and the Sierra de Bacadéhuachi to the east. The land cover in Granados mainly comprises subtropical forest (67%), desert grassland (15%) and foothills thornscrub (13%). The northern portion of the Bavispe River valley near the municipal seat of Granados is used for farmland.

=== Climate ===
Granados has a semi-arid climate. Average temperatures in the municipality range between 14 and 22 °C (57–72 °F), and average annual precipitation ranges between 400 and 600 millimetres (16–24 in).

Climate data for Granados weather station at 29°51′23″N 109°18′20″W, 529 m above sea level (1981–2010 averages, 1951–2010 extremes)
Month	Jan	Feb	Mar	Apr	May	Jun	Jul	Aug	Sep	Oct	Nov	Dec	Year
Record high °C (°F)	35.0 (95.0)	36.0 (96.8)	39.0 (102.2)	42.0 (107.6)	46.0 (114.8)	48.0 (118.4)	48.0 (118.4)	46.0 (114.8)	46.0 (114.8)	43.0 (109.4)	39.0 (102.2)	33.0 (91.4)	48.0 (118.4)
Mean daily maximum °C (°F)	22.8 (73.0)	24.7 (76.5)	28.4 (83.1)	33.2 (91.8)	37.6 (99.7)	41.2 (106.2)	38.8 (101.8)	37.4 (99.3)	37.1 (98.8)	33.1 (91.6)	27.4 (81.3)	22.1 (71.8)	32.0 (89.6)
Daily mean °C (°F)	13.6 (56.5)	15.3 (59.5)	18.5 (65.3)	22.6 (72.7)	27.1 (80.8)	31.7 (89.1)	31.0 (87.8)	29.7 (85.5)	28.5 (83.3)	23.5 (74.3)	17.3 (63.1)	13.2 (55.8)	22.7 (72.9)
Mean daily minimum °C (°F)	4.4 (39.9)	5.8 (42.4)	8.5 (47.3)	12.0 (53.6)	16.6 (61.9)	22.1 (71.8)	23.1 (73.6)	22.1 (71.8)	19.9 (67.8)	13.9 (57.0)	7.3 (45.1)	4.3 (39.7)	13.3 (55.9)
Record low °C (°F)	−4.0 (24.8)	−3.0 (26.6)	1.0 (33.8)	1.0 (33.8)	5.0 (41.0)	10.0 (50.0)	12.0 (53.6)	15.0 (59.0)	12.0 (53.6)	−1.0 (30.2)	−1.0 (30.2)	−6.0 (21.2)	−6.0 (21.2)
Average precipitation mm (inches)	26.6 (1.05)	22.0 (0.87)	12.8 (0.50)	8.7 (0.34)	3.1 (0.12)	20.4 (0.80)	114.3 (4.50)	104.2 (4.10)	56.9 (2.24)	29.9 (1.18)	21.1 (0.83)	42.5 (1.67)	462.5 (18.21)
Average rainy days (≥ 1 mm)	3.3	2.7	1.7	1.0	0.7	2.6	10.6	10.0	4.7	2.8	1.9	3.3	45.3
Source: Servicio Meteorológico Nacional

== History ==
The Opata are the indigenous inhabitants of the Granados valley. The settlement of Granados was founded in 1823 by members of the Durazo family from Moctezuma and their friend Ramón Arvizu.

On 3 December 1862, the municipality of Granados was established in the district of Moctezuma. It became an independent municipality in 1916. From 31 December 1930 to 16 April 1932 it was merged with the municipality of Cumpas.

== Administration ==
The municipal government of Granados comprises a president, a councillor (Spanish: síndico), and three trustees (regidores) elected by relative majority. The current president of the municipality is José Vinicio Durazo Durazo.

== Demographics ==
In the 2020 Census, Granados recorded a population of 1009 inhabitants living in 342 households. The 2010 Census recorded a population of 1150 inhabitants in Granados. The municipal seat, also known as Granados, is the only inhabited locality in the municipality.

== Economy and infrastructure ==
In the 2015 Intercensal Survey, 35% of Granados's workforce was employed in the primary sector, 15% in the secondary sector, 13% in commerce, and 34% in services. Cattle farming is the main economic activity.

A paved road runs from Granados north to Huásabas, where it intersects with the highway to Moctezuma and Hermosillo. There is also an airstrip in Granados.
