= Granados, Sonora =

Granados San Isidro de los Granados
- Town
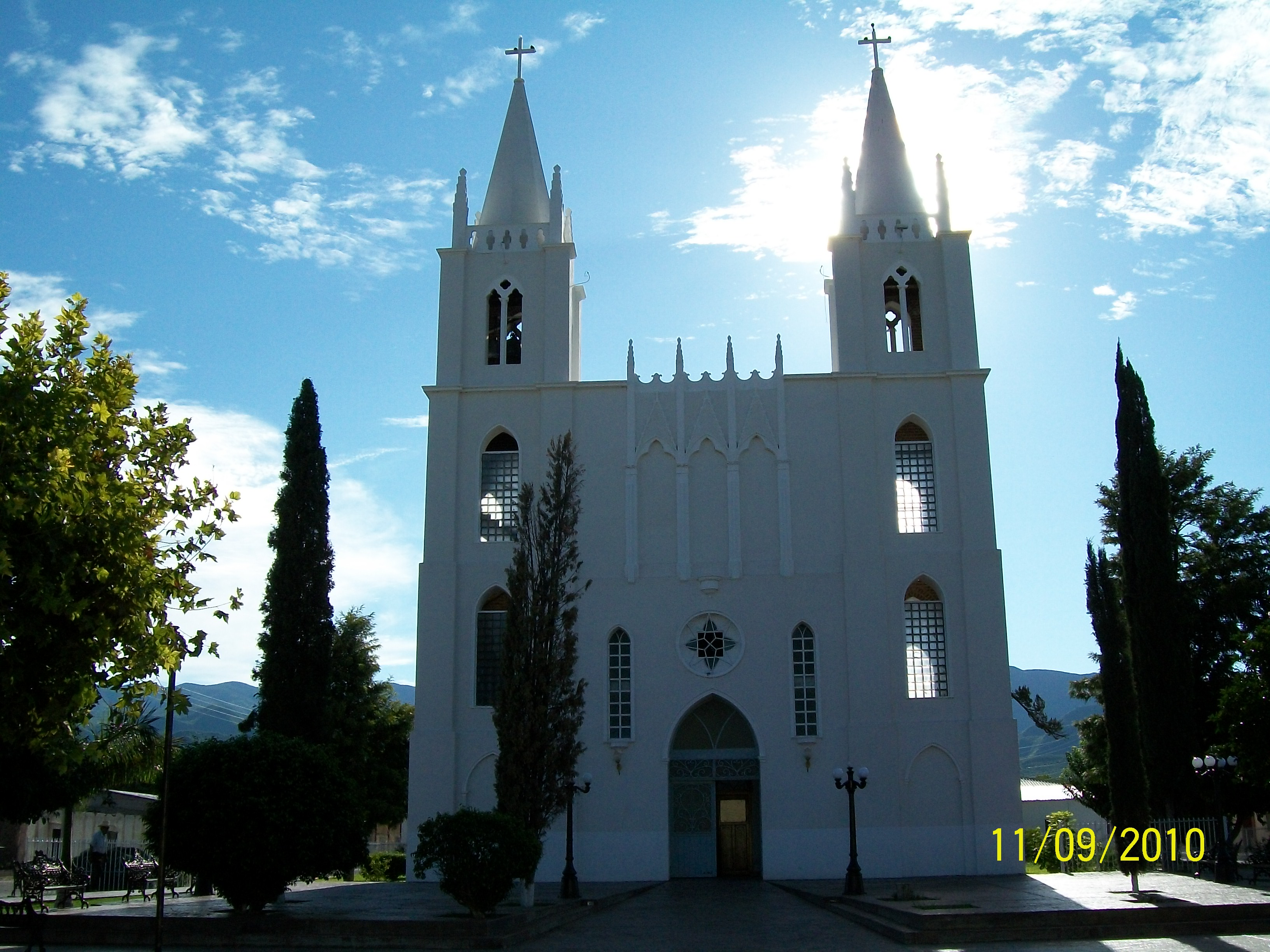
- Saint Isidro Labrador Church

- Location within Mexico
- Coordinates: 29°52′N 109°17′W
- Country: Mexico
- State: Sonora
- Municipality: Granados
- Founded: 1823

Area
  - Total: 361.27 km^{2} (139.49 sq mi)

Population (2010)
  - Total: 1,150
- Time zone: UTC-7 (Pacific MST)
- Postal code: 84460

Granados is the municipal seat of Granados Municipality in the northeast of the Mexican state of Sonora. The municipal area is 361.27 km^{2}, and the population was 1,228 according to the 2000 census. By 2005 the population had decreased to 938 due to emigration due to insufficient educational infrastructure and the lack of job opportunities.

The terrain is mountainous and the average annual temperature is 19 °C. The rainy season is from July to September and the average annual rainfall is 485.9 mm.

Subsistence agriculture and cattle raising are the main economic activities. The main crops are corn and beans and grasses for fodder. Calves are exported to the United States of America.

The town was named after Don José Joaquín Granados y Gálvez, second bishop of Sonora from 1788 to 1794.

== Climate ==
Climate data for Granados, Sonora (1991–2020 normals, extremes 1981–2016)
Month	Jan	Feb	Mar	Apr	May	Jun	Jul	Aug	Sep	Oct	Nov	Dec	Year
Record high °C (°F)	35 (95)	38 (100)	39 (102)	43 (109)	46 (115)	48 (118)	48 (118)	46 (115)	46 (115)	43 (109)	39 (102)	33 (91)	48 (118)
Mean daily maximum °C (°F)	23.2 (73.8)	25.4 (77.7)	29.4 (84.9)	33.7 (92.7)	37.9 (100.2)	42.1 (107.8)	39.1 (102.4)	37.9 (100.2)	37.4 (99.3)	33.6 (92.5)	27.6 (81.7)	22.4 (72.3)	32.5 (90.5)
Daily mean °C (°F)	13.7 (56.7)	15.6 (60.1)	19.2 (66.6)	22.9 (73.2)	27.1 (80.8)	32.3 (90.1)	31.1 (88.0)	30.1 (86.2)	28.8 (83.8)	23.8 (74.8)	17.7 (63.9)	13.5 (56.3)	23.0 (73.4)
Mean daily minimum °C (°F)	4.3 (39.7)	5.8 (42.4)	9.0 (48.2)	12.2 (54.0)	16.4 (61.5)	22.5 (72.5)	23.1 (73.6)	22.4 (72.3)	20.2 (68.4)	14.1 (57.4)	7.8 (46.0)	4.5 (40.1)	13.5 (56.3)
Record low °C (°F)	−4 (25)	−3 (27)	1 (34)	1 (34)	4 (39)	10 (50)	12 (54)	15 (59)	12 (54)	−1 (30)	−1 (30)	−6 (21)	−6 (21)
Average precipitation mm (inches)	21.6 (0.85)	19.6 (0.77)	9.6 (0.38)	3.9 (0.15)	3.0 (0.12)	18.6 (0.73)	112.6 (4.43)	88.5 (3.48)	53.1 (2.09)	22.8 (0.90)	22.1 (0.87)	34.9 (1.37)	410.3 (16.15)
Average rainy days	2.7	2.6	1.5	0.5	0.6	2.5	10.9	9.6	4.8	2.3	2.2	2.7	42.9
Source: Servicio Meteorológico Nacional

== Notable people ==
- Juan Valencia Durazo, politician who served in the Congress of Sonora
