= Hermosillo Cathedral =

Coordinates: 29.0751°N 110.9597°W

- Catedral de la Asunción
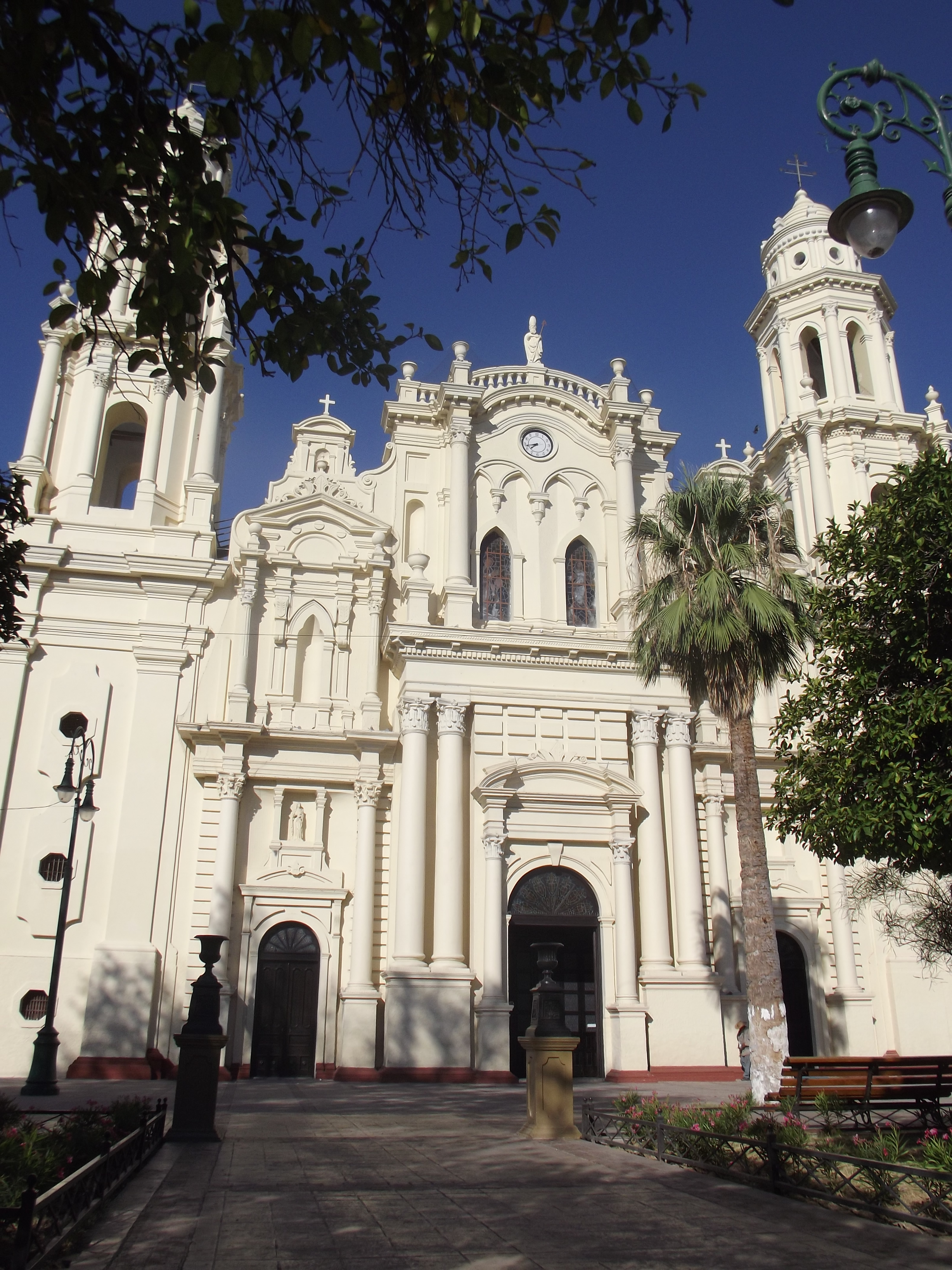
- Hermosillo Cathedral
- Location: Hermosillo, Sonora
- Country: Mexico
- Denomination: Roman Catholic
- Website: catedraldehermosillo.com.mx

History
- Status: Cathedral
- Founded: 1877
- Founder: Bishop Herculano López de la Mora
- Dedication: The Assumption of Mary
- Consecrated: September 24, 1908

Architecture
- Functional status: Active
- Architectural type: Cathedral
- Style: Baroque Revival, Gothic Revival and Neoclassical.
- Groundbreaking: 1887.
- Completed: September 24, 1908.

Specifications
- Height: 30 m (98 ft 5 in)

Administration
- Archdiocese: Roman Catholic Archdiocese of Hermosillo

Clergy
- Archbishop: Ruy Rendón Leal
- Vicar: Lauro Evaristo Alvarado

Hermosillo Cathedral or the Assumption Cathedral (locally called "La Catedral" or "La Catedral de la Asunción") stands 30 meters tall as the principal church of the Roman Catholic Archdiocese of Hermosillo and one of the most emblematic buildings of the Mexican city of Hermosillo.

Before the actual building was built, there was a smaller chapel, built in the 18th century. The current structure had to be built as the previous building was too small for the congregation. The building was supported by the then Bishop Herculano López de la Mora, and was consecrated in 1908 while still unfinished. The dome was completed in 1963.
