= Hermosillo Tower =

Torre Hermosillo
- Torre
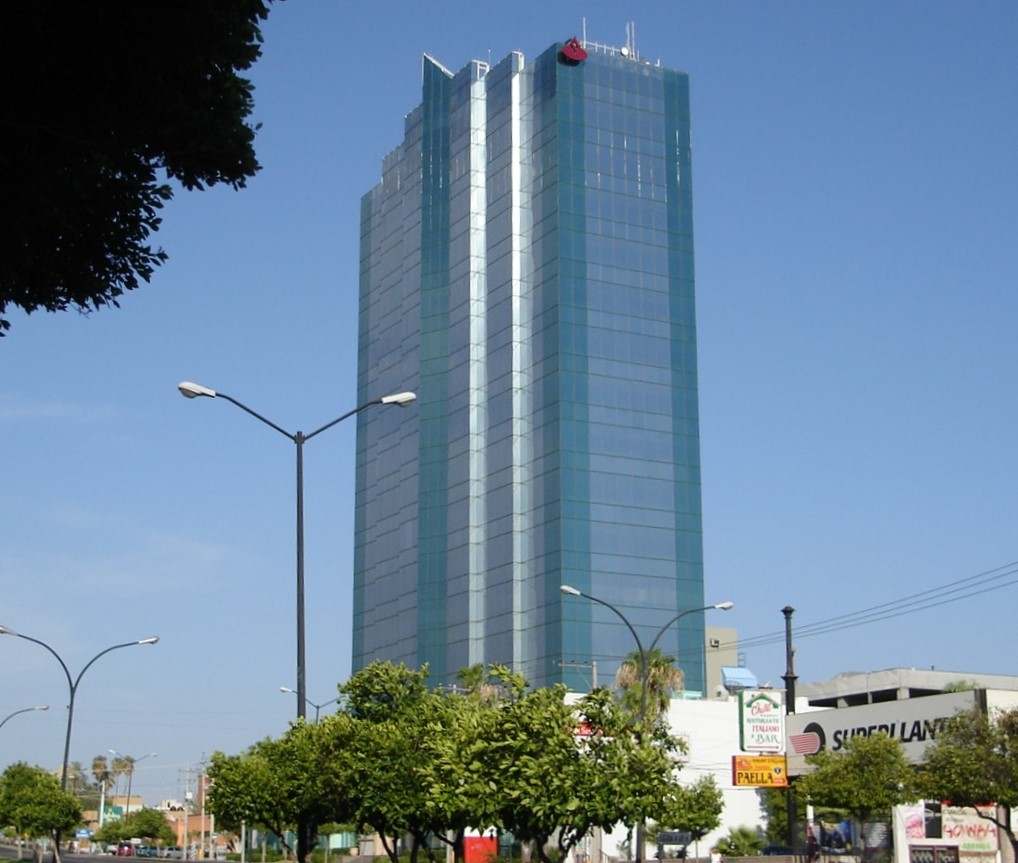
- Interactive map of the Torre Hermosillo area

Record height
- Tallest in Hermosillo since 1995^{[I]}

General information
- Type: Office
- Location: 309 Bouleverd Kino, Hermosillo, Sonora 83260; Mexico
- Coordinates: 29°05′50″N 110°56′25″W
- Construction started: 1994
- Completed: 1995

Height
- Antenna spire: 65 m (213 ft)
- Roof: 61 m (200 ft)
- Top floor: 57 m (187 ft)

Technical details
- Floor count: 17
- Floor area: 9,000 m²

.Torre Hermosillo, also known as Hermosillo Tower, is a high-rise office building in Hermosillo, Sonora, Mexico. Located in the northeastern part of the city, the tower is situated along Boulevard Francisco Eusebio Kino, within the city's Hotel Zone and one of its principal commercial areas. At approximately 65 meters (213 feet) in height and with 19 floors, it is the fourth-tallest tower in Hermosillo and is one of the most recognizable buildings in the city's skyline.

== History ==
Torre Hermosillo was developed during a period of economic and urban growth in Hermosillo during the 1990s. Construction began in 1994 and the building was completed in 1995. At the time of its completion, it was among the tallest modern office buildings in the city and represented a significant addition to the developing skyline along Boulevard Francisco Eusebio Kino.

The tower was designed primarily for commercial and office use. Its construction contributed to the development of the area surrounding the Hotel Zone, which became one of the principal concentrations of hotels, corporate offices and other commercial establishments in northern Hermosillo.

The building was developed by Grupo Delphi, which is also associated with the ownership of the property.

== Architecture ==
The tower rises approximately 65 meters from ground level and contains 19 floors. Its architecture is characterized by a predominantly glass-and-concrete exterior, with a relatively narrow vertical profile that gives the building a prominent appearance when viewed from the surrounding streets.

The building's height and location allow it to be visible from several parts of northern and central Hermosillo. Unlike many of the city's newer residential towers, Torre Hermosillo was conceived primarily as an office building, reflecting the commercial character of the area in which it was constructed.

With approximately 9,000 square meters of floor area, the building provides space for offices and other commercial activities. Different companies and institutions have occupied offices within the tower throughout its history.

== Location ==
Torre Hermosillo is located on Boulevard Francisco Eusebio Kino, an important north–south thoroughfare in Hermosillo. The surrounding area contains numerous hotels, restaurants, commercial buildings and corporate offices, making the tower part of one of the city's principal business districts.

Its position within the Hotel Zone also gives it a prominent place in views of the Hermosillo skyline from the surrounding streets and major roads. The building is particularly noticeable among the lower-rise development that surrounds much of the area.

== Tenants ==
The building has been used by a variety of businesses and institutions since its completion. Government agencies, financial organizations and private companies have occupied office space within the tower. Banobras, for example, has documented office space on the twelfth floor of the building.

The use of the building has changed over time as different organizations have moved into and out of the tower, while its primary function has remained commercial office space.

== In the skyline ==
For many years after its completion, Torre Hermosillo was one of the tallest buildings in both Hermosillo and the state of Sonora. Its 65-meter height made it a prominent landmark during a period when the city's skyline consisted predominantly of low- and mid-rise buildings.

The construction of taller buildings in Hermosillo during the 21st century eventually caused Torre Hermosillo to fall in the city's height rankings. It is currently surpassed by several newer high-rise buildings, including Torre Ámbar, ParkView Pitic and Alatorre 1122.

Despite no longer being the tallest building in the city, Torre Hermosillo remains a notable element of the Hermosillo skyline and one of the city's better-known office towers.

== See also ==
- List of tallest buildings in Hermosillo
- Hermosillo
