= María Dolores del Río =

Mexican politician

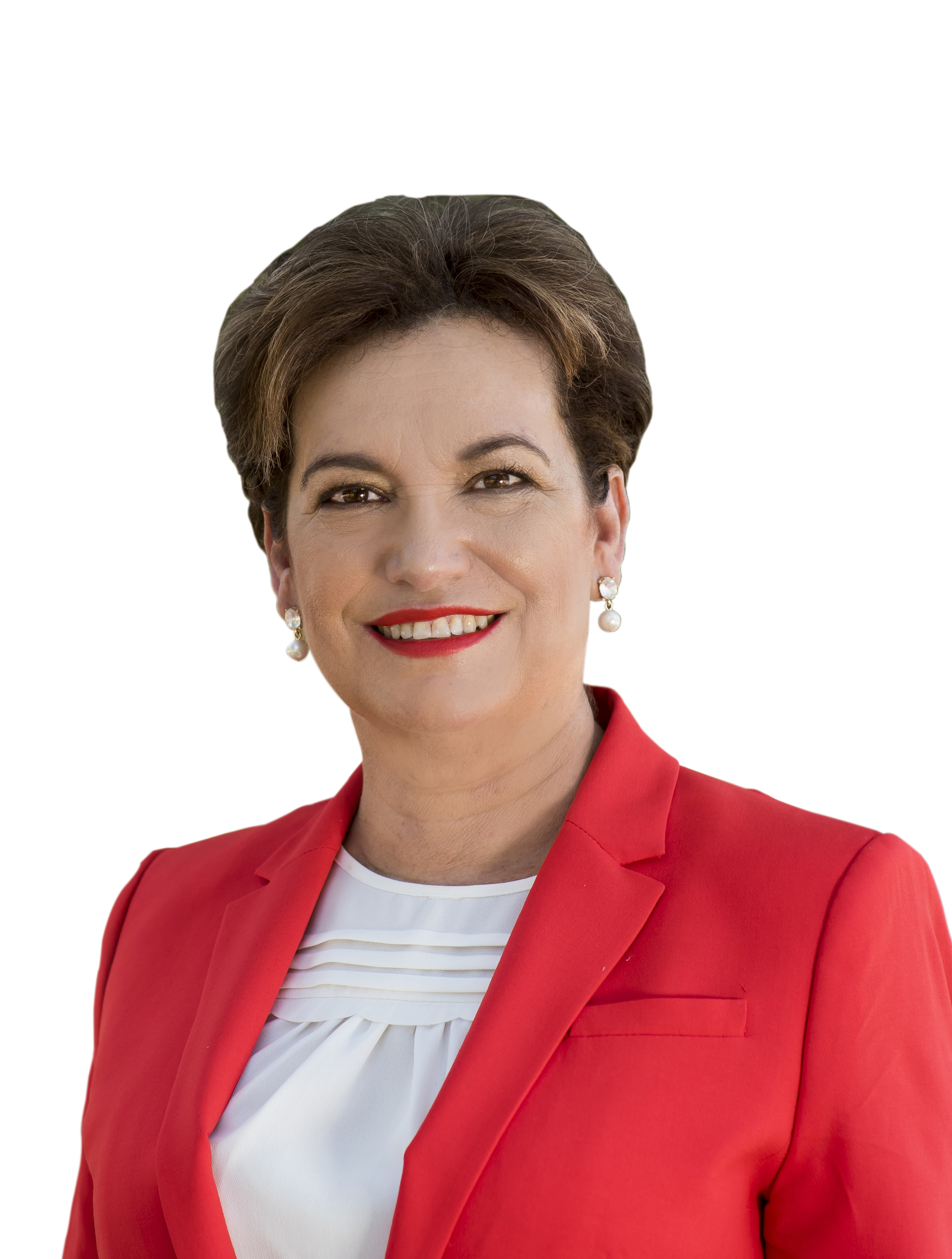
- del Río in 2016
- Born: 10 October 1960 (age 65); Hermosillo, Sonora, Mexico
- Occupation: Politician
- Political party: Movimiento Ciudadano

María Dolores del Río Sánchez (born 10 October 1960) is a Mexican politician. From 2009 to 2012 she served as Deputy of the LXI Legislature of the Mexican Congress representing Sonora. She also served as municipal president of Hermosillo from 2003 to 2006. She is now the State Coordinator of Movimiento Ciudadano in Sonora.

== See also ==
- List of municipal presidents of Hermosillo
