= List of municipal presidents of Hermosillo =

The following is a list of municipal presidents of Hermosillo in Sonora state, Mexico.

Municipal president	Term	Political party	Notes
Pedro de Corbalán	1772		
Francisco Serna Salazar	1869–1870	Liberal Party	
Francisco Buelna León	1870	Liberal Party	
J. Serna	1870	Liberal Party	
Ignacio Buelna	1870	Liberal Party	
Ignacio Félix	1870	Liberal Party	
Ignacio Buelna	1871–1872	Liberal Party	
Ignacio Félix	1872	Liberal Party	
Francisco Buelna León	1873	Liberal Party	
Julián Escalante y Moreno	1873–1874	Liberal Party	
Vicente V. Escalante	1874–1875	Liberal Party	
Francisco M. Aguilar	1875	Liberal Party	
Ignacio Buelna	1876–1877	Liberal Party	
Francisco Buelna León	1877–1878	Liberal Party	
Florencio Monteverde	1878–1879	Liberal Party	
Francisco Gándara	1879–1880	Liberal Party	
Francisco Gándara	1880–1881	Liberal Party	
Francisco Buelna León	1881–1882	Liberal Party	
Manuel I. Gándara	1882	Liberal Party	
Manuel D. Rodríguez	1884–1886	Liberal Party	
Rafael Ruiz	1886	Liberal Party	
Eduardo Castañeda	1887	Liberal Party	
Víctor Aguilar	1887–1888	Liberal Party	
Juan D. Castro	1888–1891	Liberal Party	
Manuel Mascareñas	1892–1895	National Porfirian Circle	
Vicente V. Escalante	1895–1898	National Porfirian Circle	
Vicente V. Escalante	1898–1899	National Porfirian Circle	
Vicente V. Escalante	1899–1900	National Porfirian Circle	
Filomeno Loaiza	1900–1901	National Porfirian Circle	
Simón Bley	1901–1902	National Porfirian Circle	
Simón Bley	1902–1903	National Porfirian Circle	
Manuel I. Loaiza	1903–1904	National Porfirian Circle	
Guillermo Arreola	1904–1908	National Porfirian Circle	
Filomeno Loaiza	1908–1909	National Porfirian Circle	
Taidée López del Castillo	1909–1910	National Porfirian Circle	
Guillermo Arreola	1910–1911	National Porfirian Circle	
José María Paredes	1911	Independent	
José C. Camou	1911–1912	Progressive Constitutionalist Party	
Gustavo F. Muñoz	1912–1913	Progressive Constitutionalist Party	
Rodolfo Garduño	1913	Independent	
Juan B. León	1913–1914	Independent	
Enrique Astiazarán	1914–1916	Independent	
Carlos Caturegly	1916–1917	Constitutionalist Liberal Party	
Leandro P. Gaxiola	1917–1918	Constitutionalist Liberal Party	
Ignacio L. Romero	1918–1919	Constitutionalist Liberal Party Party	
Jesús María Ávila	1919–1920	Independent	
Ramón D. Rodríguez	1920–1921	Constitutionalist Liberal Party Party	
José Obregón	1921–1922	Laborist Party	
Luis Encinas R.	1922–1923	Laborist Party	
Ignacio L. Romero	1923	Constitutionalist Liberal Party	
Ignacio Salazar Q.	1923–1924	Laborist Party	
Clemente H. Ávila	1924–1925	Laborist Party	
Adalberto Truqui	1925	Laborist Party	
Ignacio Salazar Q.	1925–1926	Laborist Party	
Luis Cambustón	1926	Laborist Party	
Francisco L. Carreón	1926–1927	Laborist Party	
Luis A. Peterson	1927	Independent	
Leovigildo Gómez	1927–1928	Independent	
Ramón D. Rodríguez	1928–1929		
Manuel Cubillas	1929–1931	PNR	
Luis Encinas Robles	1931–1932	PNR	
Francisco López	1932–1933	PNR	
Genaro Romero	1933–1935	PNR	
Hilario Olea	1935	PNR	Acting municipal president
Manuel Puebla	1936–1937	PNR	
Antonio López	1937	PNR	
Manuel León	1937–1939	PNR	
Abelardo B. Sobarzo	1939–1941	PRM	
Severiano Talamante	1941–1943	PRM	
Francisco L. Carreón	1943–1946	PRM	
Roberto R. Romero	1946–1949	PRI	
Hilario Olea, Jr.	1949–1952	PRI	
Domingo Olivares R.	1952–1955	PRI	
Carlos G. Balderrama	1955–1958	PRI	
César A. Gándara	1958–1961	PRI	
Eduardo Loustaunau Ruiz	1961–1964	PRI	
Roberto Astiazarán Espinoza	1964–1965	PRI	Died in office
Alberto R. Gutiérrez	1965–1967	PRI	Acting municipal president
Alfonso Durán Vázquez	1967	PRI	Acting municipal president
Jorge Valdez Muñoz	1967–1970	PAN	
Eugenio Hernández Bernal	1970–1973	PRI	
Alfonso Aguayo Porchas	1973–1976	PRI	
Ramón Ángel Amante Echeverría	1976–1979	PRI	
Alicia Arellano Tapia	1979–1982	PRI	
Casimiro Navarro Valenzuela	1982–1985	PAN	
Héctor Guillermo Balderrama Noriega	1985–1988	PRI	
Carlos Robles Loustaunau	1988–1989	PRI	
Edmundo Astiazarán Estrella	1989–1991	PRI	
Guatimoc Francisco Yberri González	1991–1994	PRI	
Gastón González Guerra	1994–1997	PRI	
Jorge Eduardo Valencia Juillerat	1997–2000	PAN	
Francisco de Paula Búrquez Valenzuela	2000–2003	PAN	
María Dolores del Río Sánchez	16-09-2003–15-09-2006	PAN	
Ernesto Gándara Camou	16-09-2006–2008	PRI; Panal	Alliance PRI Sonora-Panal. He applied for a temporary leave
Raymundo García de León Peñúñuri	2008–2009	PRI; Panal	Alliance PRI Sonora-Panal. Acting municipal president
Ernesto Gándara Camou	2009	PRI; Panal	Alliance PRI Sonora-Panal. Resumed
Javier Gándara Magaña	16-09-2009–15-09-2012	PAN	
Alejandro Arturo López Caballero	16-09-2012–15-09-2015	PAN; Panal	
Manuel Ignacio Acosta Gutiérrez	16-09-2015–2018	PRI; PVEM; Panal	Coalition "For an Honest and Effective Government". He applied for a temporary leave
Lourdes Angelina Muñoz Fernández	2018	PRI; PVEM; Panal	Coalition "For an Honest and Effective Government". Acting municipal president
Célida Teresa López Cárdenas	16-09-2018–08-04-2021	PT; Morena; PES	Coalition "Together We Will Make History". She applied for a temporary leave
Fermín González Gaxiola	09-04-2021–10-06-2021	PT; Morena; PES	Coalition "Together We Will Make History". Acting municipal president
Célida Teresa López Cárdenas	11-06-2021–06-07-2021	PT; Morena; PES	Coalition "Together We Will Make History". Resumed. Applied for a temporary leave, again
Fermín González Gaxiola	07-07-2021–15-09-2021	PT; Morena; PES	Coalition "Together We Will Make History". Acting municipal president, for a second time
Antonio Astiazarán Gutiérrez	16-09-2021–15-09-2024	PAN; PRI; PRD	Coalition "It Goes for Sonora"
Antonio Astiazarán Gutiérrez	16-09-2024–	PAN; PRI; PRD	He was reelected

== See also ==
- Sonora State election, 2018
- Hermosillo history
