= Hermosillo =

Hermosillo Pitic
- City
- Ciudad de Hermosillo; City of Hermosillo
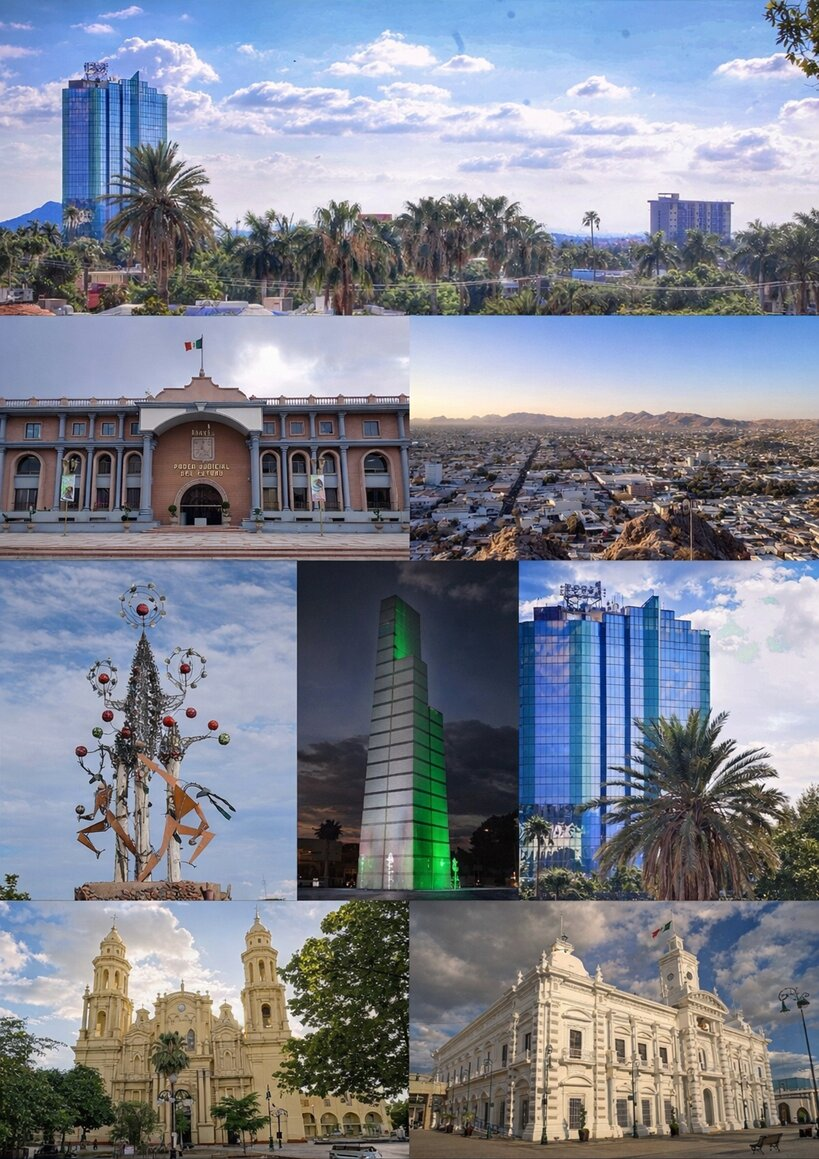
- Panoramic view of Hermosillo, Judicial Power of the State of Sonora, View of the city, Sculpture, Fountain three boulevard, Hermosillo Tower, Catedral de la Asuncion in Hermosillo, Government Palace of Sonora

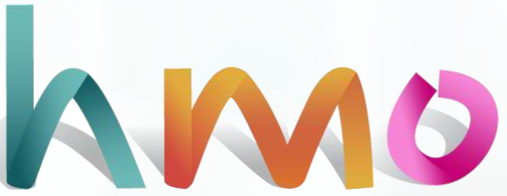
- Seal Logo
- Nickname: "La ciudad del sol" ("The City of the Sun")
- Location within Sonora Location within Mexico
- Coordinates: 29°05′56″N 110°57′15″W
- Country: Mexico
- State: Sonora
- Municipality: Hermosillo
- Founded: 18 May 1700
- Municipal status: 9 February 1825
- Founder: Juan Bautista de Escalante
- Named for: José María González Hermosillo

Government
  - Mayor: Antonio Astiazarán (PAN)
  - Federal electoral district: SON-3 & SON-5

Area
  - City: 168.20 km^{2} (64.94 sq mi)
- Elevation (of seat): 200 m (660 ft)

Population
  - City: 855,563
  - Density: 4,800/km^{2} (12,500/sq mi)
  - Urban: 899,817
  - Metro: 944,000
- Demonym: Hermosillense

GDP (PPP, constant 2015 values)
  - Year: 2023
  - Total: $33.4 billion
  - Per capita: $36,700
- Time zone: UTC−07:00 (Zona Pacífico)
- Postal code: 83000
- Area code: +52 662
- Website: Official site (in Spanish)

Hermosillo (Latin American Spanish: [eɾmoˈsiʝo]), formerly called Pitic (as in Santísima Trinidad del Pitic and Presidio del Pitic), is the capital and largest city of the northwestern Mexican state of Sonora, and the municipal seat of the municipality of Hermosillo. It also is the primary economic center for the state and the region. According to the 2020 census, the city has a population of 936,263, making it the 18th largest city in Mexico. The recent increase in the city's population is due to expanded industrialization, especially within the automotive industry.

In 2013 and 2018, Hermosillo was ranked as one of the top cities in Mexico for quality of life by the Strategic Communications Cabinet of the Mexican Federal Government.

Hermosillo was also ranked in 2016 as the seventh most competitive city in the country according to the Mexican Institute for Competitiveness (IMCO), based on factors such as its economic diversification, geographical location, access to education, government, innovation and international relations. The major manufacturing sector has been the production of automobiles since the 1980s. It is one of the richest cities in Mexico by GDP per capita.

Hermosillo has a subtropical hot desert climate (BWh). Temperatures have been as high as 49.5 °C (121.1 °F) in the summer months, making it one of the hottest cities in the country.

== History ==
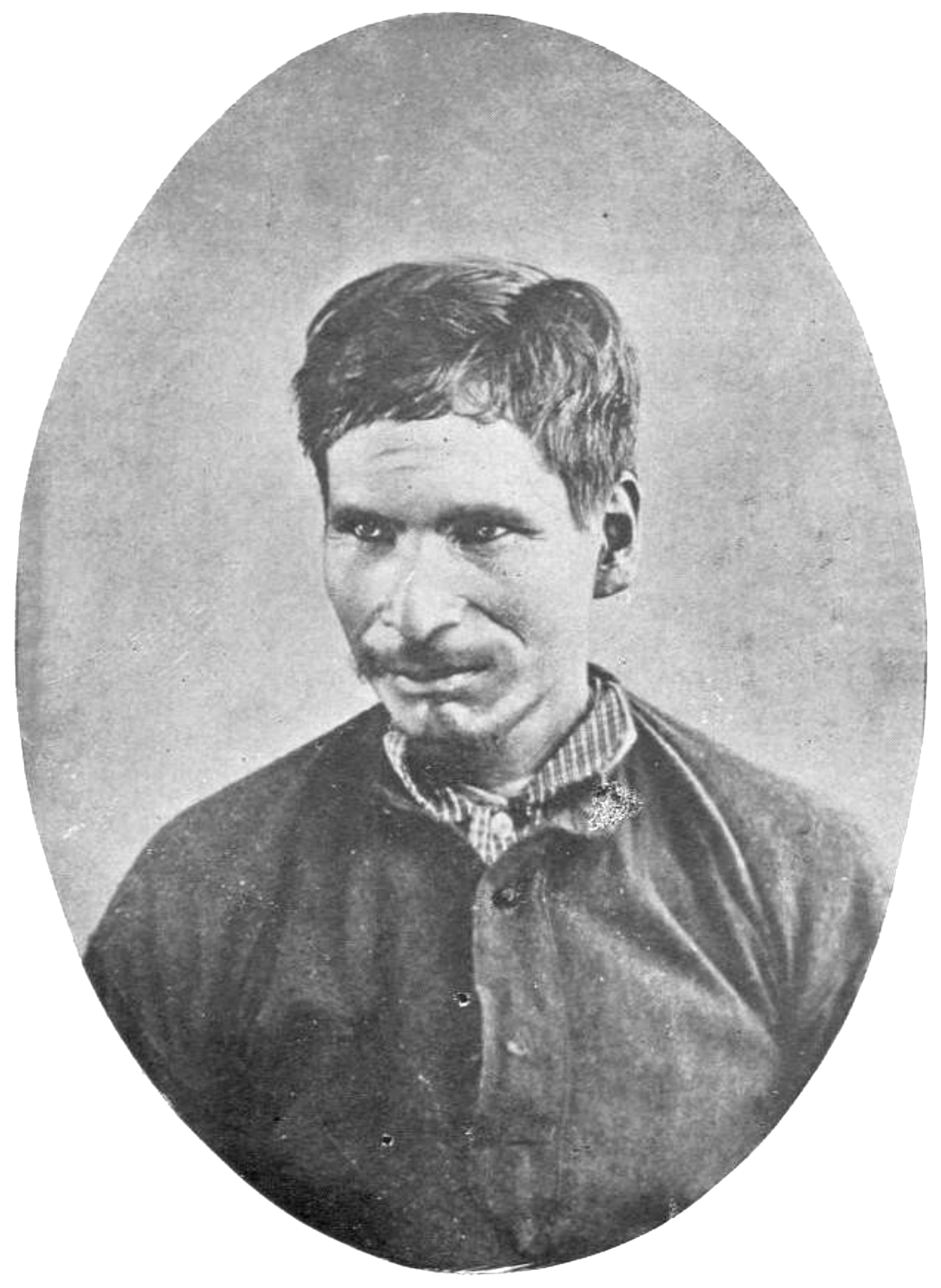
Anastasio Cuca, Yaqui leader, 1887

Evidence from a site called the San Dieguito Complex, located in the El Pinacate Zone, suggests the area has been inhabited by humans for about 3,000 years. Evidence of agriculture dates back 2,500 years. In the pre-Hispanic era, this area was inhabited by the historic Seri, Tepoca, and Pima peoples.

The first encounter between the Spanish and the indigenous peoples of the area occurred in the middle of the 16th century, when European explorers came in search of gold. The Spanish explorers were followed by Jesuit missionaries in the state of Sonora around 1614. Eusebio Francisco Kino arrived in 1687, founding a mission in nearby Cucurpe. The present-day states of Sonora and Sinaloa were loosely organized as the provinces of Sonora, Ostimuri, and Sinaloa.

In 1700, three small Spanish villages were founded in what is now the outskirts of Hermosillo: Nuestra Señora del Pópulo, Nuestra Señora de Los Angeles, and la Santísima Trinidad del Pitic. The native peoples here soon became hostile to the colonists and repeatedly drove them out in the early 18th century. In 1716, the Spanish offered irrigated lands for farmers to the native peoples, who agreed to abide by Spanish law. Around 1726, a fort named the Presidio of Pitic was constructed to stop the domination of this area by the natives, especially the Seri. However, the situation remained contentious. The first church was not built until 1787, and the first formal parish was not established until 1822.

During the Mexican War of Independence, Sonora and the town of Pitic stayed loyal to the Spanish Crown. Local general Alejo García Conde defeated insurgent José María González Hermosillo, who had been sent by Miguel Hidalgo y Costilla. Following independence from Spain, in 1825 the village of Pitic was made the seat of the department of the same name. In 1828, the settlement changed its name to Hermosillo to honor the insurgent leader José María González de Hermosillo.

The first native Spanish speakers to convert to Mormonism were baptized in Hermosillo in 1877. A Latter Day Saints branch was formed there in 1879, and there continues to be a community of Latino Mormons in the area to this day.

A battle between imperial and republican forces occurred in 1866 during the French Intervention in Mexico. In 1879, the capital of the state of Sonora was moved from Arizpe to Hermosillo. In 1881 the railroad linking Hermosillo with Guaymas and Nogales was finished, allowing for economic expansion in the area by bringing in mining equipment and modern agricultural equipment. Since then, the city has been an economic center for northwest Mexico.

During the Mexican Revolution, beginning in 1910, forces loyal to Pancho Villa were expelled from the city by General Manuel M. Diéguez. After the assassination of Francisco I. Madero in 1913, Venustiano Carranza, then governor of Coahuila, sought refuge in Hermosillo. Here, Carranza began the Constitutionalist Movement. As a result, Hermosillo is nicknamed the "revolutionary capital of the country."

From the late 19th century, until around 1920, Chinese immigrants entered the state of Sonora as laborers. A significant number settled in the city of Hermosillo. Some of these immigrants established businesses, especially shoe manufacturing and clothing. Some of the most successful Chinese-owned businesses in Sonora were based in Hermosillo, and sold their merchandise to other parts of the country. But by the 1920s, anti-Chinese sentiment had become strong in Sonora state, and many Chinese left for Mexico City or the United States.

In the 1980s, Ford Motor Company built a plant. This strongly influenced the city and state economy.

Hermosillo was the site of a tragic fire, at the ABC Child Care Center, on June 5, 2009. According to the Procuraduría General de Justicia en el Estado (State Attorney General Office) de Sonora, the fire resulted in 49 deaths at the center; nearly half of them were children. The fire is believed to have started at an adjacent automobile shop, before spreading to the child care center. Most of the children died of asphyxiation. There were about a hundred children inside the building. Firefighters had to smash holes in the walls to rescue the children, who ranged in age from six months to five years.

=== Origins ===
The origin of Hermosillo dates to the 1700s, when the mission villages of Our Lady of The Populace, Our Lady of Angels, and the Holy Trinity of Pitic were founded. They collected members of the Yaqui, Seri, Tepoca, and Pima Bajo peoples.

Years earlier, internal difficulties had occurred between the Tepoca and the Bajo Pima peoples. The Spanish wanted to bring them into the mission villages to have more control over their work.

The villages and city were intended to contain the Seri and Tepoca Indians, to protect the Hispanic expansion. It was called the Real Presidio de San Pedro de la Conquista, named after Viceroy Don Pedro de Castro y Figueroa, Duke of the Conquest and Marquis of Grace. The explorer in charge of the foundation of the peoples was Juan Bautista de Escalante, who pacified tensions.

On May 18, 1700, he gave a speech that was documented, in part:

"Sending them to have no wars from now on, but to live as Christians and to deal with each other with fairs of the clothes of their use and seeds of their plantings, to which they responded from one and the other, which they would do thank ingsands thank ing best for the good that they made peace of way."

In 1718, on the orders of Governor Manuel de San Juan y Santa Cruz, the town of the Holy Trinity of Pitic was repopulated; on September 29, 1725, the Seri settled in the Pópulo rose in the son of war and invaded the people of Opodepe. The Seri were persecuted for the purpose of punishing them until they signed the peace in January 1726, and they were settled in the Porplo and in the points called Alares and Moraga; subsequently given the uncertainty due to the bellicoseness of the indigenous, the Pitic presidio was formed.

==== Presidio de San Pedro de la Conquista del Pitic ====
In June 1741, Don Agustin de Vildósola established the Presidio de San Pedro de la Conquista del Pitic. Nine years later, the troops of the Pupium were transferred to El Pópulo, in the present municipality of San Miguel de Horcasitas. As a result of this action, Pitic was left in a very precarious situation, because numerous residents emigrated for fear of the Seri.

While the Presidio's settlement was about to disappear, senior authorities ordered a group of soldiers to remain on site to ensure the safety of the settlers. In 1772, the mayor Pedro de Corbalán ordered the construction of a canal on the left bank of the Rio Sonora, to irrigate the lands and orchards.

Pitic's Villa .A. Before the end of the eighteenth century the former Presidio of San Pedro de la Conquista del Pitic became Villa del Pitic.

On February 9, 1825, the Villa del Pitic was established as the head of the party, dependent on the Department of Horcasitas. This coincided with the urbanization that the royal surveyors gave it, as it progressed steadily.

In 1827, the city had approximately eight thousand inhabitants, The houses were scattered in all directions due to its unique urbanization. The region was fertile, well-cultivated and provided many luxuries. It is still famous for its high-quality and cheap beef.

==== The Village of Hermosillo ====
On September 5, 1828, by decree no. 77 of the H. Legislature of the State of the West, the name Villa del Pitic was deleted and the name of the City of Hermosillo was imposed, in honor of the general jalisciense José María González de Hermosillo who in the late 1810s had carried the task of the national insurrection to lands Sinaloenses, then part of the Western State as well.

On March 12, 1831, the State of Sonora was founded and Hermosillo was its first capital from 14 May of that year to May 25, 1832, when the capital powers were transferred to the city of Arizpe. In 1837, the city was erected at the head of the district of its name. On the same date, Don Pascual Iñigo began the construction of the Chapel of Our Lady of Carmen.

On October 14, 1852, in the city, a section of filibusters under the command of Gastón de Raousset-Boulbon faced and defeated the national forces, who were under the leadership of General Miguel Blanco de Estrada; this was part of a revolutionary campaign of independence that was intended however to turn Sonora and Lower California into colonial territories of France. However, Raousset remained only a few days in the city, choosing to go to Guaymas to continue his campaign where he would eventually be defeated by General José María Yáñez Carrillo in Battle of Guaymas in 1854.

On May 4, 1866, under the Second Mexican Empire of Maximilian of Habsburg, republican troops commanded by the general Ángel Martínez attacked and seized the city, which was being defended by the Second Mexican Empire under Colonel María Tranquilino Almada. However, a few hours later, it fell back into the hands of the forces of the Second Empire. On November 13, 1866, General Martinez again took the city in blood and fire, causing the imperialists to flee; but they returned and regained it eight days later.

In 1879, Hermosillo was once again the headquarters of state powers, thanks to the management of the acting governor Don Francisco Serna, at least on an interim date. However, when the new Political Constitution of the State of Sonora was issued on September 15, 1917, it was definitively confirmed that the city of Hermosillo is the headquarters of the state powers, as referred to in article 28 thereof.

On November 4 in front of the wooden station of Sonora, dozens of people gathered at the opening of the Guaymas-Hermosillo railway section. On the train came Don Carlos Rodrigo Ortiz Retes, accompanied by the commander of the Military Zone, brigadier Colonel José Guillermo Carbó. Months later, both cargo and passenger service would be established between Guaymas and the Noals.

=== 20th century ===
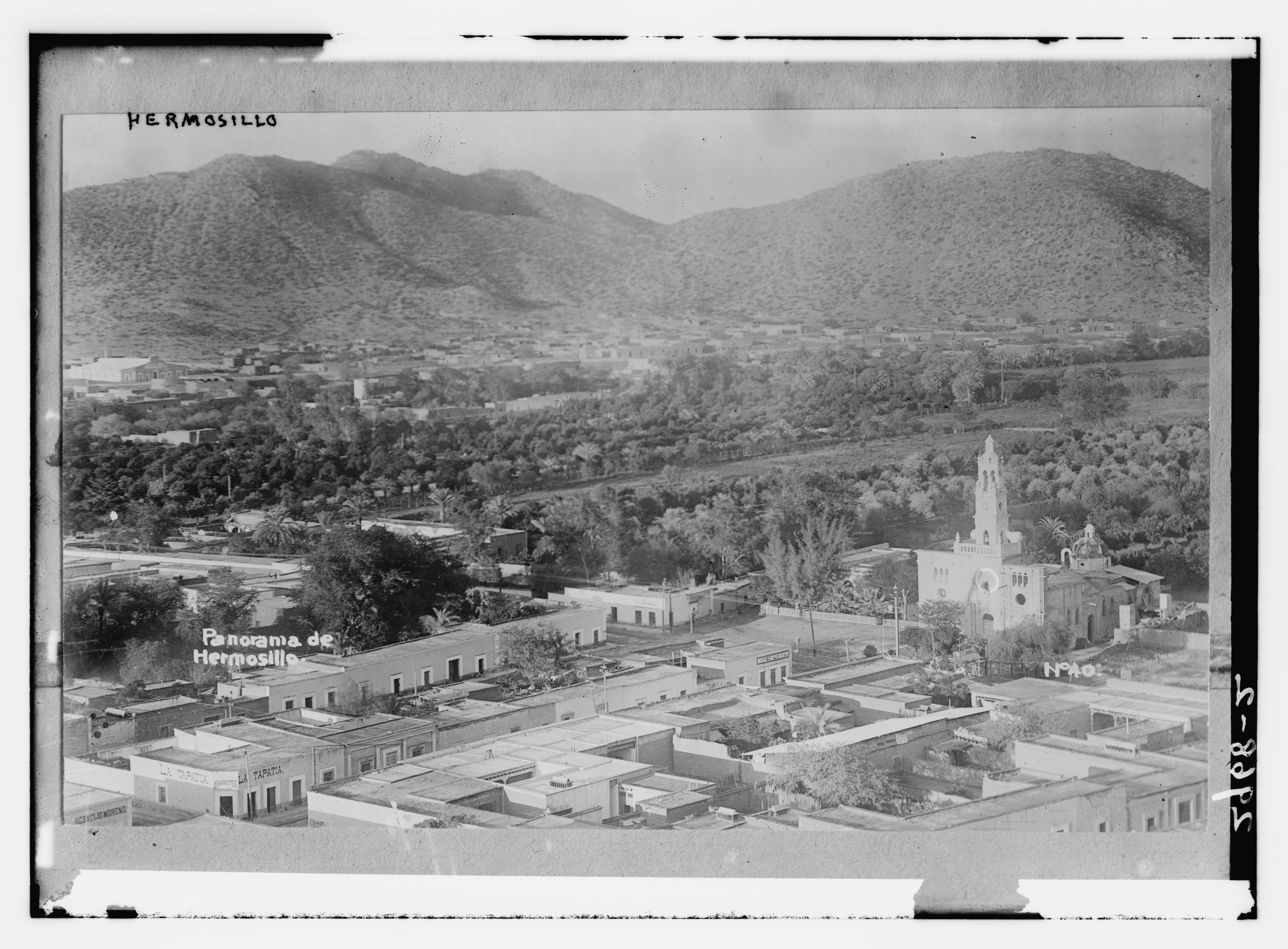
Overview of the city of Hermosillo with Chapel of our Lady of Carmen on the right, in front of Madero Park, c. 1910

At the beginning of the 20th century, Hermosillo had about 14,000 inhabitants. During the Mexican Revolution, forces loyal to Francisco 'Pancho' Villa were expelled from the city by General Manuel M. Diéguez. After the assassination of Francisco I. Madero in 1913, Venustiano Carranza, then governor of Coahuila sought refuge in Hermosillo. Here Carranza began the Constitutionalist Movement; because of this, Hermosillo has the nickname "the revolutionary capital of the country".

In the late 19th century and the first two decades of the 20th century, Chinese immigrants arrived in Sonora. One of the settlements with a significant number was the city of Hermosillo. Some of these immigrants had money and used it to set up businesses, especially shoe and clothing manufacturing. Some of the most successful businesses with Chinese owners in Sonora were in Hermosillo and sold merchandise to other parts of the country. However, in the 1920s, sentiment against the Chinese population in Sonora grew, resulting in many fleeing to Mexico City or the United States.

In the 1980s, Ford built Hermosillo Stamping & Assembly in the city, which had a major impact on the city's economy and that of the state. A whole chain of suppliers was also developed around the assembly plant, which further contributed to economic growth in Hermosillo. Hermosillo was selected partly due to its proximity to the United States.

=== 21st century ===
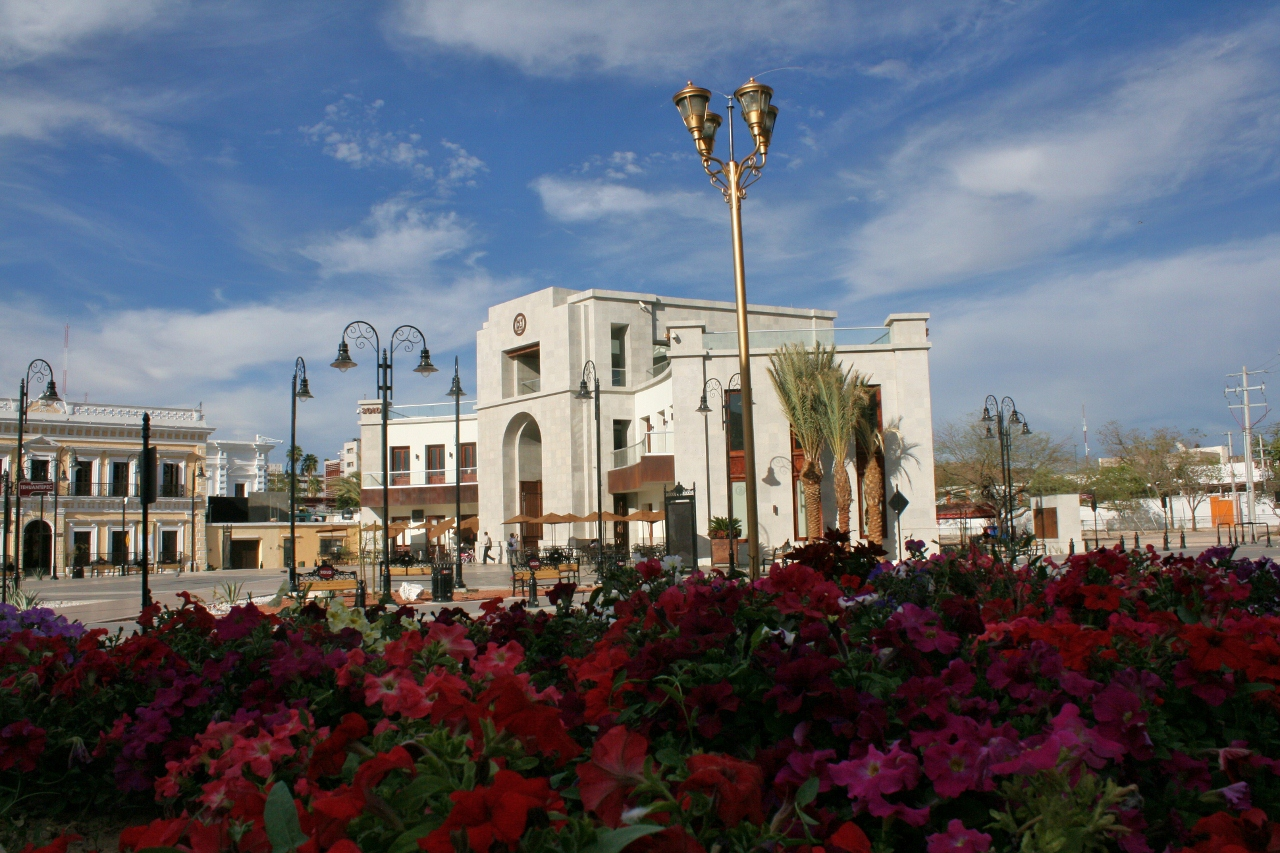
Plaza Bicentenario in Hermosillo, 2011

In 2000, the businessman Pancho Búrquez was elected as municipal president for National Action Party, in that triennium, the municipality won national awards (such as that of the Secretariat of Comptroller ship and Administrative Development of the federal government, as well as of the International City/County Management Association as one of the most transparent cities in the world. Investment grew in the early decade thanks to the ease of doing business.

One of the most important events in Hermosillo was the ABC Nursery Fire on June 5, 2009. According to the Attorney General's Office of the State of Sonora, there were 49 deaths in the fire. The fire apparently began in a warehouse, then expanded to the daycare. Most of the children died of asphyxiation. There were about 100 children inside the building; firefighters and the population had to make holes in the walls to rescue the children, ranging from six months to five years.

The fire caused a stir both nationally and internationally. As a result of these events, on June 3, 2010, a decree was published in the Official Journal of the Federation declaring June 5 a day of national mourning. The National Flag is flown at half-mast on June 5 of each year. Parents of victims and citizen organizations annually remind the nation by releasing pink and blue balloons on behalf of the nursery children who died. Changes were made in the General Law on Provision of Services for Child Care, Care and Integral Child Development, a legal framework that regulates the operation of nurseries at the national level, to ensure the tragedy would not be repeated. The changed standard was published in the [Official Journal of the Federation], on October 27, 2011.

== Geography ==
As the municipal seat, the city of Hermosillo is the local government of over 3,800 other localities, with a combined territory of 14,880.2 square kilometres (5,745.3 sq mi).

The two most important rivers are the Sonora and the San Miguel. Both of these are used for irrigation purposes with the Abelardo L. Rodriguez Dam located on the San Miguel River. The population increase of the municipality, currently at 2.5% annually, puts pressure on the infrastructure of the city, especially its water supply. Decades of overpumping of ground water have led to the aquifer levels being lower than sea levels, and sea water creeping in as an "artificial recharge."

=== Climate and ecology ===
Under the Köppen climate classification, Hermosillo features a borderline hot arid (BWh)/hot semi-arid (BSh) climate. Temperatures can range from as low as freezing in December and January to 48 °C (118.4 °F) in June and July. Rain falls mostly between July and September, with annual precipitation between 75 and 400 millimetres (3.0 and 15.7 in). Hermosillo's all-time weather record for high temperature is 49.5 °C (121.1 °F), which was achieved in June 2014. In recent years, the lowest temperature was −4 °C (24.8 °F), in December.

Most of the regional flora consists of mesquite trees, with an added mixture of blue agave, desert ironwood, palo verde and the huisache. Native fauna includes the desert tortoise, several species of rattlesnake and kingsnake, mule deer (locally called 'coues' deer), collared peccary, ringtail, ocelot, puma, desert bighorn sheep, opossum, raccoon, coyote, and bobcat. Black bear may be observed on occasion, on the fringes of settled areas. In August 2022, the once-common jaguar was finally witnessed in the Hermosillo area. Locals nicknamed the lone male "El Jefe", meaning "boss". The critically endangered Sonoran pronghorn antelope was once common in the area; less than 200 are thought to exist today, with an additional -200 (declining) surviving in the U.S. state of Arizona. Populations of feral red-masked parakeets and monk parakeets are a local sightseeing attraction here.

Climate data for Hermosillo (Observatorio) 1991–2020 normals, extremes 1961–present
Month	Jan	Feb	Mar	Apr	May	Jun	Jul	Aug	Sep	Oct	Nov	Dec	Year
Record high °C (°F)	35.0 (95.0)	41.0 (105.8)	42.5 (108.5)	44.0 (111.2)	46.0 (114.8)	49.5 (121.1)	48.5 (119.3)	45.6 (114.1)	45.5 (113.9)	43.5 (110.3)	44.3 (111.7)	36.0 (96.8)	49.5 (121.1)
Mean daily maximum °C (°F)	24.6 (76.3)	26.6 (79.9)	29.5 (85.1)	33.2 (91.8)	37.8 (100.0)	41.9 (107.4)	40.2 (104.4)	39.3 (102.7)	38.8 (101.8)	35.2 (95.4)	29.5 (85.1)	24.4 (75.9)	33.4 (92.1)
Daily mean °C (°F)	17.2 (63.0)	18.8 (65.8)	21.2 (70.2)	24.5 (76.1)	28.8 (83.8)	33.1 (91.6)	33.2 (91.8)	32.8 (91.0)	31.8 (89.2)	27.6 (81.7)	21.7 (71.1)	17.1 (62.8)	25.7 (78.3)
Mean daily minimum °C (°F)	9.8 (49.6)	10.9 (51.6)	12.8 (55.0)	15.7 (60.3)	19.8 (67.6)	24.3 (75.7)	26.1 (79.0)	26.2 (79.2)	24.8 (76.6)	19.9 (67.8)	13.9 (57.0)	9.8 (49.6)	17.8 (64.0)
Record low °C (°F)	−3.0 (26.6)	−0.6 (30.9)	3.0 (37.4)	6.0 (42.8)	6.0 (42.8)	8.5 (47.3)	17.0 (62.6)	13.0 (55.4)	14.6 (58.3)	2.8 (37.0)	1.4 (34.5)	−4.0 (24.8)	−4.0 (24.8)
Average precipitation mm (inches)	15.8 (0.62)	15.4 (0.61)	6.2 (0.24)	1.9 (0.07)	1.6 (0.06)	5.1 (0.20)	91.1 (3.59)	92.2 (3.63)	63.4 (2.50)	15.5 (0.61)	13.1 (0.52)	23.4 (0.92)	344.7 (13.57)
Average precipitation days (≥ 0.1 mm)	2.0	1.7	0.9	0.3	0.2	0.5	8.4	8.9	5.1	1.3	1.2	2.2	34.7
Average relative humidity (%)	53	48.5	44	38.5	36	37.5	51	56.5	53.5	47	49	54.5	47.4
Mean monthly sunshine hours	210.8	223.2	269.7	294.0	328.6	321.0	266.6	254.2	261.0	272.8	222.0	198.4	3,142.3
Source: Servicio Meteorológico Nacional (temperature, 1981–2010) (humidity, 1981–2000)

== Demographics ==
Historical population
Year	Pop.	±%
1930	28,869	—
1940	30,065	+4.1%
1950	54,503	+81.3%
1960	118,051	+116.6%
1970	208,164	+76.3%
1980	340,779	+63.7%
1990	448,966	+31.7%
1995	559,154	+24.5%
2000	609,829	+9.1%
2005	701,838	+15.1%
2010	784,342	+11.8%
2015	884,273	+12.7%
Source: INEGI

According to the results of INEGI, Hermosillo is Mexico's 16th largest city, with 812,229 people. Other important communities in the municipality include Miguel Alemán (30,869), Bahía Kino (6,050), San Pedro el Saucito (2,938), El Tazajal (2,062), La Victoria (1,966), Zamora (1,049), and Mesa Del Seri (908). The recent city population spur is due to its recent strong industrialization, especially in the automotive industry and its providers.

== Economy ==
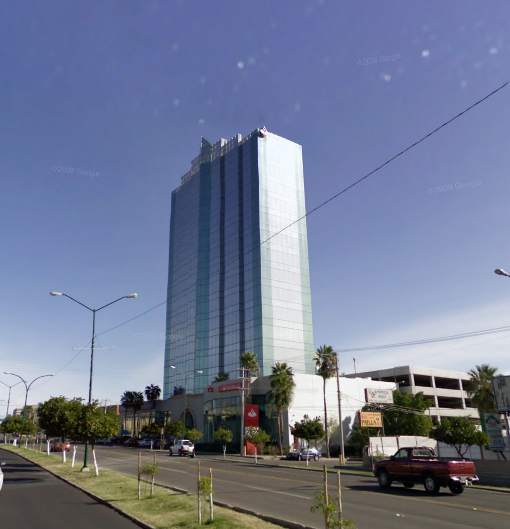
Torre Hermosillo, built in 1995 in Northeast Hermosillo

Most of the municipality's population lives in the city proper, with most jobs located in the manufacturing and commerce sectors here. About 250,000 hectares are under cultivation in the city's outskirts, most of which is near the coast. Crops include wheat, grapes, flowers, chickpeas, alfalfa and walnuts. Livestock has been traditionally important here, especially beef cattle. Pigs, sheep, goats, horses, domestic fowl and bees are also raised here as well. Fishing is practiced along the coast with shrimp being the most important catch.

Industry and manufacturing has been the most dynamic sector of the economy. Much of this began in the 1980s with the establishment of the automobile industry, specifically the Hermosillo Stamping & Assembly plant owned and operated by Ford Motor Company. Electronics and IT are the largest employers by both revenue and number of employees. Today, there are twenty-six major manufacturers, which generate about 68,300 jobs, employing about thirty percent of the population.

Other than cars, products manufactured here include televisions, computers, food processing, textiles, wood products, printing, cellular phones, chemicals, petroleum products and plastics. Lanix electronics has a major research and design facility and its main manufacturing plant in Hermosillo. The city and its municipality have twelve industrial parks, which house over one hundred smaller manufacturing enterprises. There has been slowing of this sector especially the automobile industry because of the global economic downturn that began in 2008.

Commerce employs more than half of the population; besides small local businesses, chains are well represented; these are locally, regionally (Northwest Mexico), nationally, and U.S.-based. Tourism is mostly limited to the coastal communities of Bahia de Kino, Kino Nuevo and Punta Chueca, where there are cave paintings and a recreational park named La Sauceda. In 2009, Standard & Poor's rated the municipality of Hermosillo as (mxA/Estable/-) based on its administrative practices, financial flexibility and limited financial risks. Financial management of the municipality has been prudent, with adequate documentation of practices. Debt levels have also been prudent at about 33% of gross income, which might decline in 2010. However, the municipality has limited liquid capital.

== Sports ==
=== Baseball ===
The city has a professional baseball team called Naranjeros de Hermosillo (Orange Growers) that plays in the Estadio Sonora. Baseball has been popular in Hermosillo since the late 19th century. The club had its beginnings in the 1950s, when the Liga Invernal de Sonora (Sonora Winter League) was founded as a complement to the already existing Liga de la Costa del Pacífico (Pacific Coast League). The Naranjeros were officially organized in 1958. Since then, the team has won 16 championships in the Pacific Coast League and two championships in the Caribbean Series. Hermosillo hosted the 2013 Caribbean Series in February.

In 2021, Hermosillo and Ciudad Obregón co-hosted the 3rd U-23 Baseball World Cup, organized by the World Baseball Softball Confederation. In 2022, Hermosillo hosted the 5th U-15 Baseball World Cup.

=== Basketball ===
Founded in 2009, the Rayos de Hermosillo has been Hermosillo's professional basketball club. The Rayos play in the Circuito de Baloncesto de la Costa del Pacífico (CIBACOPA) and play their home games at the Gimnasio del Estado.

They have won 4 league titles (2012, 2013, 2019, 2024).

=== Football ===
Since 2013, the city has been home to Cimarrones de Sonora FC, an association football club who currently play in the Liga de Expansión MX, the second-tier of the Mexican football league system. Home matches are played at Estadio Héroe de Nacozari. The city is also home to the Soles de Sonora of Major Arena Soccer League.

=== Field hockey ===
In 2010, Hermosillo hosted the first Pan American Youth Championship boys' field hockey tournament.

== Education and health ==
According to the 2010 population and housing census, in Hermosillo the literacy rate of people between 15 and 24 years old is 98.6% and that of people aged 25 or over is 97%.

School attendance for people aged 3 to 5 is 46.3%; from 6 to 11 years old it is 97.2%; from 12 to 14 years is 94.6% and from 15 to 24 years is 49.8%.

=== Higher education institutions ===
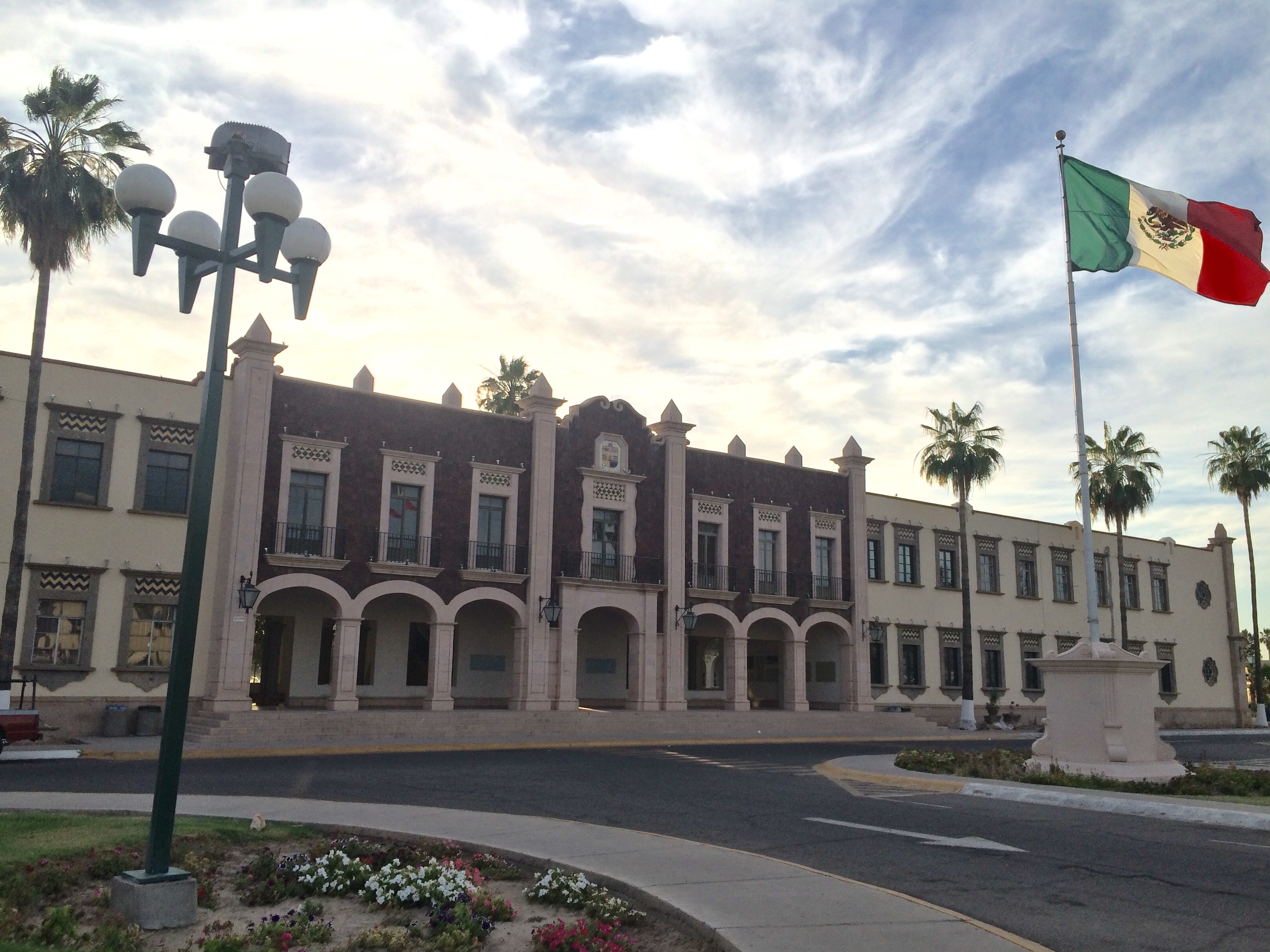
UNISON Regional Unit Center

Hermosillo has several institutions of higher education including the Universidad de Sonora Hermosillo campus, which has more than thirty thousand students in forty-six degrees and more than three thousand teachers.

There are also the Technological Institute of Hermosillo, the Monterrey Institute of Technology and Higher Education Sonora Norte campus, the Universidad del Valle de México, the University of Sonora, the Technological University of Hermosillo, Universidad Durango Santander, Centro de Vuelo Computarizado, among others.

=== Health ===
Hermosillo is home to the most important public hospital in Sonora, the General Hospital of the State of Sonora. Also the Children's Hospital of the State of Sonora (HIES) and the Women's Integral Hospital of the State of Sonora (HIMES) where hundreds of children are received and treated and women as well as the Oncology Hospital in which patients referred from the previous three and from the rest of the state are treated for this type of care as well as multiple family medical units and general hospitals in the IMSS area, ISSSTE and ISSSTESON (the equivalent of ISSSTE but for workers in the Sonoran State service), Regional Military Hospital and not to mention that health in Hermosillo is going to the forefront with certified private hospitals such as CIMA Hospital and San José Hospital and private clinics such as: Noroeste Medical Center, San Benito Clinic, Licona Hospital and San Francisco Clinic among others. INEGI data report that in 2011 there were 482 medical units.

In Hermosillo, 76% of the population has access to some type of right of habitation. Of the entire population of the municipality, 47.5% have access to IMSS, 11% to Popular Insurance, 14.4% to ISSSTE, and 6.3% have another type of medical security.

== Parks and recreation ==
Hermosillo is located on a plain in the Sonoran Desert, surrounded by grassy flat areas, beyond which are greener hills with serrated peaks in the distance. The city is a common stopover for North Americans traveling by car toward the coast, and is the only city in Mexico that purifies all drinking water before it goes to homes. The city is the major economic center for the state, with about thirty percent of the state's population living in the city.

The center of the city is Plaza Zaragoza, which was built in 1865 and has a Moorish-style gazebo which was brought from Florence, Italy in the early 20th century. It also has a flower garden and statues of General Ignacio Pesqueira and General García Morales.

The plaza is framed by the State Government Palace and the cathedral. The Palacio de Gobierno (Spanish for "Government Palace") was constructed in 1881 using stone from the nearby Cerro de la Campana mountain. It has a white Neoclassical facade, with the central portion extended slightly out from the rest of the building. This central part is flanked by Ionic columns and is topped by a semicircular pediment and a clock tower. To either side are windows on the first level and balconies on the second, with the corners having thick pilasters. The interior has a courtyard with a main staircase, decorated with murals depicting scenes from Sonora's history, painted in 1982–1984 by Teresa Moran, Enrique Estrada, and Héctor Martínez Arteche. The building was officially inaugurated in 1906 and reflects elements of French style, which was popular at the time.

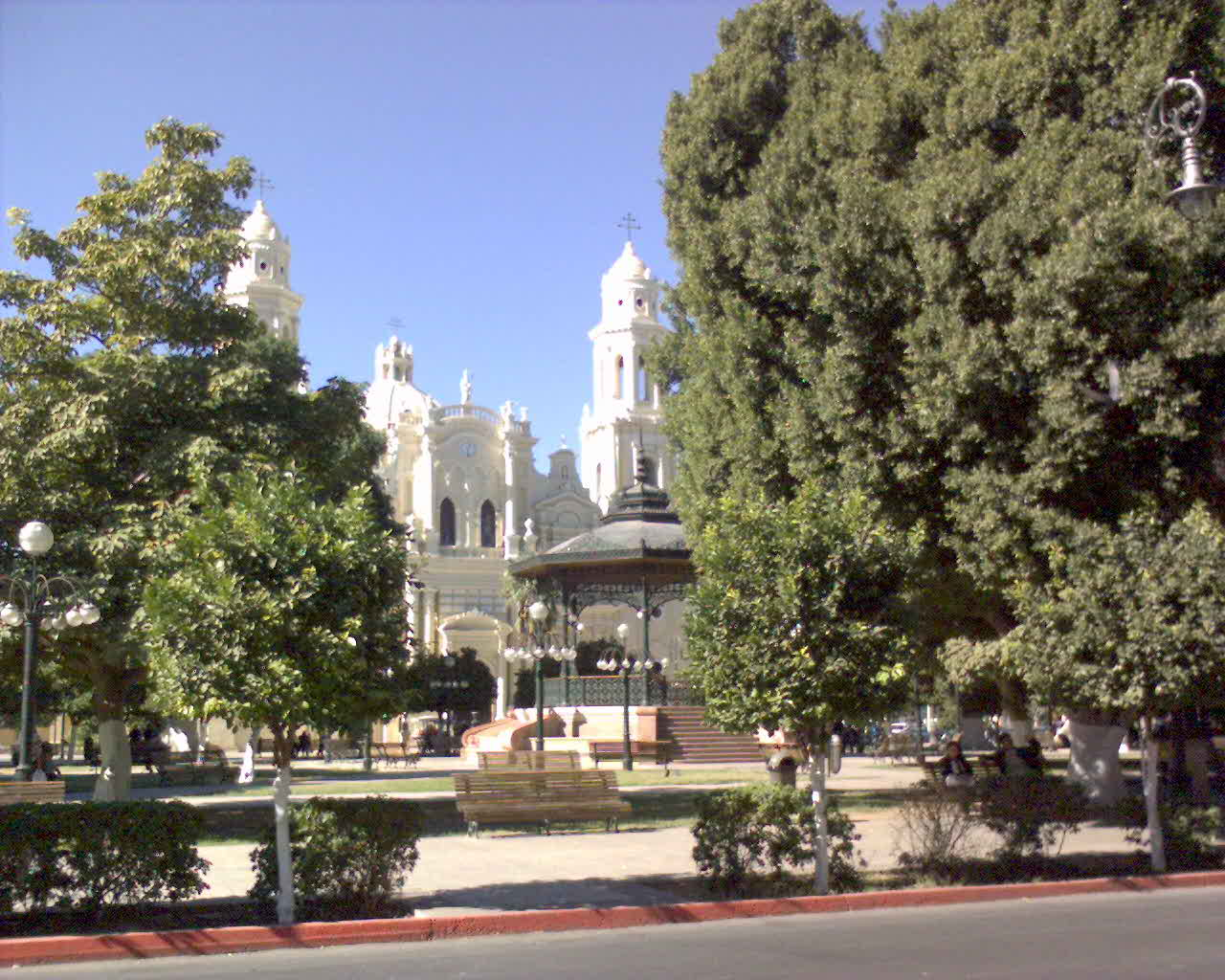
Catedral de la Asunción, Hermosillo

The cathedral, named the Catedral de la Asunción, is located next to Plaza Zaragoza. It was begun in the 18th century but was not finished until the beginning of the 20th. However, the first chapels associated with the cathedral were begun in the 18th century. Construction of the cathedral began in 1861 and is a mix of predominantly Neoclassical architecture with Neogothic decorative elements. The main entrance is flanked by paired columns on pedestals and the smaller side doors are topped with semicircular pediments. Above the main doors are two ogival or pointed windows, over which is a crest with a balustrade. The church's towers have three levels with a dome-like top and are decorated with crosses from Caravaca de la Cruz. The interior of the church is of very austere Neoclassical design.

The Regional Museum was opened in 1960 with only one small hall, which exhibited archeological finds from the region. Today, there are two large halls, one dedicated to anthropology and the other to history. The anthropology hall displays archeological finds such as tools, utensils, textiles, stone objects and more from both the pre-Hispanic and colonial periods. The second focuses on the colonial period and contains items such as documents, maps, tools, coins and more.

The Museo de Sonora (Museum of Sonora) is housed in a building that originally functioned as a prison. It was completed in 1907 and built by the mostly indigenous prisoners themselves. The prison closed in 1979. In the 1980s, the building was reconditioned, reopening as the current museum in 1985. This museum has eighteen rooms covering various aspects of the state including its paleontology, history, archeology and ethnography. It has also conserved some of the cells of the original prison. Some of the most important items in the collection include a serpent's head from the Teotihuacan period, a collection of coins from the 16th century and various antique weapons.

The Museo de Culturas Populares e Indígenas de Sonora (Museum of Popular and Indigenous Cultures of Sonora) was the former residence of Dr. Alberto Hoeffer. It was constructed in 1904 and restored in 1997, conserving its original French-inspired style. Today, it houses a museum mostly dedicated to the indigenous cultures of the state, including crafts, clothing, customs and ways of life.

The Plaza Hidalgo area of the city was a very fashionable area during the first half of the 20th century when a number of the wealthy and influential of the city built homes there. Today, many of these constructions now house institutions such as the Instituto Sonorense de Cultura, the Colegio de Sonora, Radio Sonora, the Colegio Library and the Colegio de Notarios. Each weekend, the plaza becomes a cultural center, hosting various activities and events such as concerts, exhibitions, theatrical works and more.

The Cerro de la Campana mountain is one of the symbols of Hermosillo. Its summit is 350 metres (1,150 ft) above the valley floor and contains a lookout called El Caracol, which was inaugurated in 1909. There are two theories as to the origin of the mountain's name. One states that it is from a peculiar metallic sound that is made when the mountain's rocks fall against each other. The other is based on the bell-like shape of the elevation.

Just outside the city proper on the highway to Guaymas is the Centro Ecológico de Sonora (Ecological Center of Sonora). The center has more than 300 species of plants and 200 species of animals from both Sonora and other parts of the world. All of the animals live in recreated natural habitats. The Sonoran collection is part of one of CES's main functions, which is to preserve the flora and fauna of the state. The collection contains representations of animals and plants from the four main habitats of the state: mountains, grassland, desert and sea. Some of the species are in danger of extinction such as the bighorn sheep, the white-tailed deer as well as a number of bird and reptile species.

In the Coloso neighborhood of Hermosillo, and other locations in Sonora, the Yaqui people are known for their celebrations of Holy Week, which mix Catholic and indigenous religious practices. In Hermosillo, the main brotherhood that sponsors this event is called the Fariseos. Rites performed during this week are intended to combat evil and sickness, calling upon both saints and "temastians" or medicine men to use magic to expel evil spirits. During this time participants dress in traditional Yaqui clothing and perform native dances such as El Coyote (The Coyote), Matachines, Los Pascolas and especially the Danza del Venado (Deer Dance), animal sacred to the Yaqui as a symbol of good.

Two other major festivals there include the Fiesta de la Vendimia (Grape Harvest Festival) in July and the Feria Exposición Ganadera e Industrial (Livestock and Industry Exposition and Fair) in May.

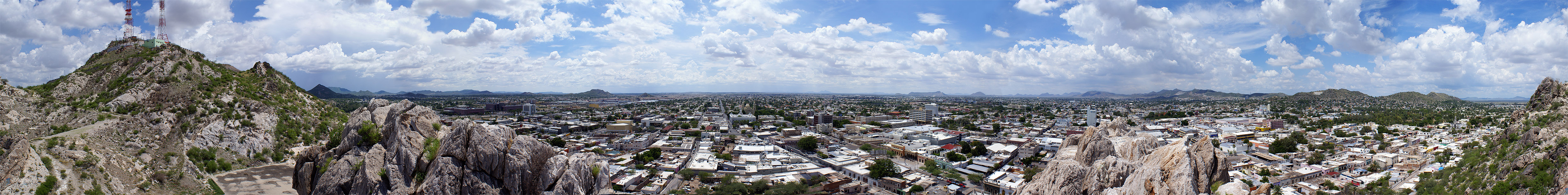
Hermosillo's panoramic view from Cerro de la Campana ('Bell Hill' in Spanish)

== Education ==
Hermosillo has several public and private higher education institutions, among them:

- Universidad de Sonora
- Tecnológico de Monterrey (ITESM), Campus Sonora Norte
- Universidad de Hermosillo
- Instituto Tecnológico de Hermosillo
- Universidad Tecnológica de Hermosillo (UTH)
- Instituto de Ciencias y Educación Superior
- Universidad del Valle de México (formerly Universidad del Noroeste)
- Universidad Durango Santander
- Universidad Kino
- Centro de Estudios Superiores del Estado de Sonora (CESUES)
- El Colegio de Sonora
- Universidad TecMilenio, Campus Hermosillo
- Centro de Investigación en Alimentos y Desarrollo (CIAD)
- Instituto de Capacitación para el Trabajo de Sonora (ICATSON)
- Colegio Nacional de Capacitación Intensiva (CNCI)
- Universidad del Desarrollo Profesional (UNIDEP)
- Escuela Normal del Estado "Profr. Jesús Manuel Bustamante Mungarro"
- Colegio Nacional de Educación Profesional Técnica (CONALEP)
- Colegio de Bachilleres del Estado de Sonora (COBACH)

Primary and secondary schools include:

- Instituto Irlandés Hermosillo
- Colegio Bicultural Génesis
- Nuevos Horizontes
- CBTIS 11

== Tourism ==
=== City center ===
==== Zaragoza Square ====
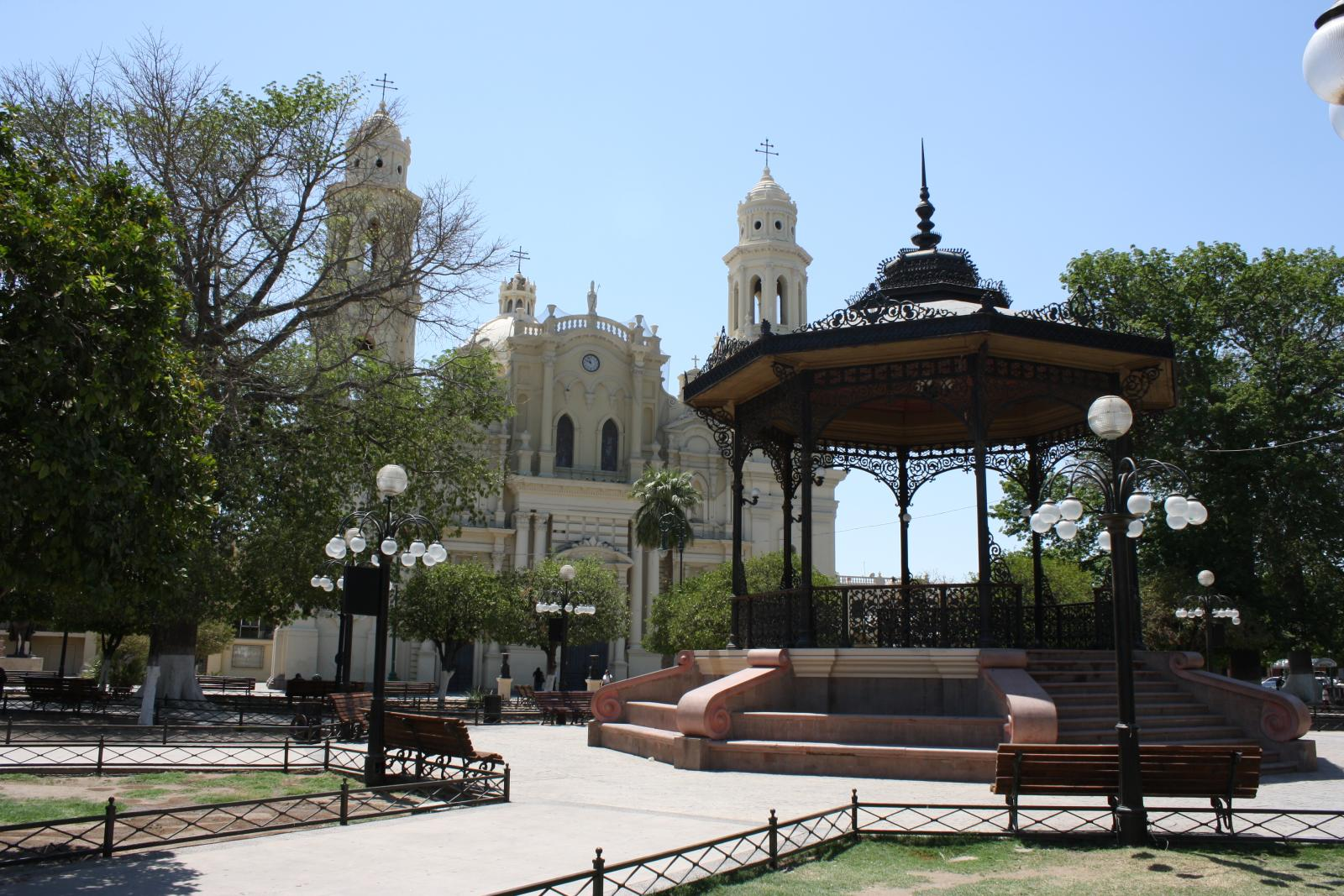
Plaza Zaragoza in Hermosillo

Plaza Zaragoza was built in 1780, and was previously known as Plaza principal. The street that is located on the east side was named after General Ignacio Comonfort, moderate liberal and former president of the Republic. The four streets located around the plaza are among the oldest structures in the city.

==== Cathedral ====
The Hermosillo Cathedral, also called La Catedral de la Asunción, is one of the most visited places in the city. Its architectural style could be classified as baroque, neoclassical and neo-Gothic. It is 30 meters tall.

==== Sonora Museum of Art (MUSAS) ====
The Sonora Museum of Art, MUSAS, is a space dedicated to the dissemination and promotion of art and culture. The museum building encompasses five thousand square meters divided into four levels. It has large areas of circulation, internal courtyards, space for services, warehouses, workshops, offices, and various areas.

Some of the exhibitions that have been presented are:

- Art and body. Museum collection, Rufino Tamayo.
- Moments. Gustavo Ozuna
- The strange journey of time. Miguel Angel Ojeda.
- Holy Chaos. Andrés Gamiochipi.

=== North zone ===
==== Bachoco Hill ====
El Bachoco is at an elevation of 610 meters and is located north of the city. It is considered by some as the best place within the city proper to partake in mountain biking and hiking. This hill features various hike paths and mountain biking trails, including a short but demanding ascent to the hill's peak. The area is also known for native wildlife spotting and birdwatching.

==== Fernando Valenzuela Stadium ====
The Fernando Valenzuela Stadium (inaugurated as Sonora Stadium) is located in the city of Hermosillo, Sonora, Mexico. It is the new home of the Naranjeros de Hermosillo, team of the Mexican Pacific League that has 16 LMP Championships (most league winner), 3 Leagues of the Coast, 1 Northern League of Sonora, 1 National Winter Series, 1 Costa Rican Winter Championship and 2 Caribbean Series.

==== Héctor Espino Stadium ====
The Héctor Espino Stadium is located in the city of Hermosillo, Sonora, Mexico. It was the home of the Naranjeros de Hermosillo, team of the Mexican Pacific League until the 2012–13 season, which was supplied by the Sonora Stadium from the 2013–14 campaign. It also hosted the Cimarrones de Sonora football team, team of the Mexican Ascent League.

=== City outskirts ===
==== San Pedro el Saucito ====
The area of San Pedro el Saucito is situated in the Municipality of Hermosillo (in the state of Sonora). There are 2,938 inhabitants. San Pedro el Saucito has an altitude of 250m.

==== Kino Bay ====
The beach is named in honor of Eusebio Francisco Kino, who visited the site during his mission work in the 17th century. An indigenous people called the Seri had lived here long before that. A group of fishermen landed on the beach in 1930 and founded what is now known as Kino Viejo.

==== Ethnic Museum of the Seris ====
The ethnic group known as the Seri call themselves "Comcaac," meaning "the People". They are now the least numerous indigenous group in Sonora.

This museum dedicated to the Seri was created with the objective of understanding and disseminating knowledge of their history, political and social organization, language, demography, clothing, architecture, crafts, festivities, etc.

==== Tiburón Island ====
Listed as an ecological reserve, this island comprises an area of 120,100 hectares (297,000 acres), within which are the small islands of San Esteban, Turner and Patos.

Tiburón Island, the largest in the Republic, was inhabited by the Seris, who attributed to the place a high religious significance.

A large number of terrestrial plant species and some 63 marine plant species have been identified on the island.

As for the native fauna, about 205 sea and land birds, 31 reptile and amphibian species and a huge number of fish that inhabit the coast of the island have been registered.

=== Expogán ===
Expogán is a family event and has activities and attractions for the whole family, from popular games to popular dances. It takes place in the city of Hermosillo during the months of April and May on the Blvd. de los Ganaderos S / N. Col. Parque Industrial, CP 83297. Each year, the exhibition presents a large billboard of artists in its palenque, one the most anticipated musical expositions in Sonora.

Some artists who have performed are:

- Juan Gabriel
- Vicente Fernández
- Joan Sebastian
- Pepe Aguilar
- Marco Antonio Solis
- Napoleón

== Transportation ==
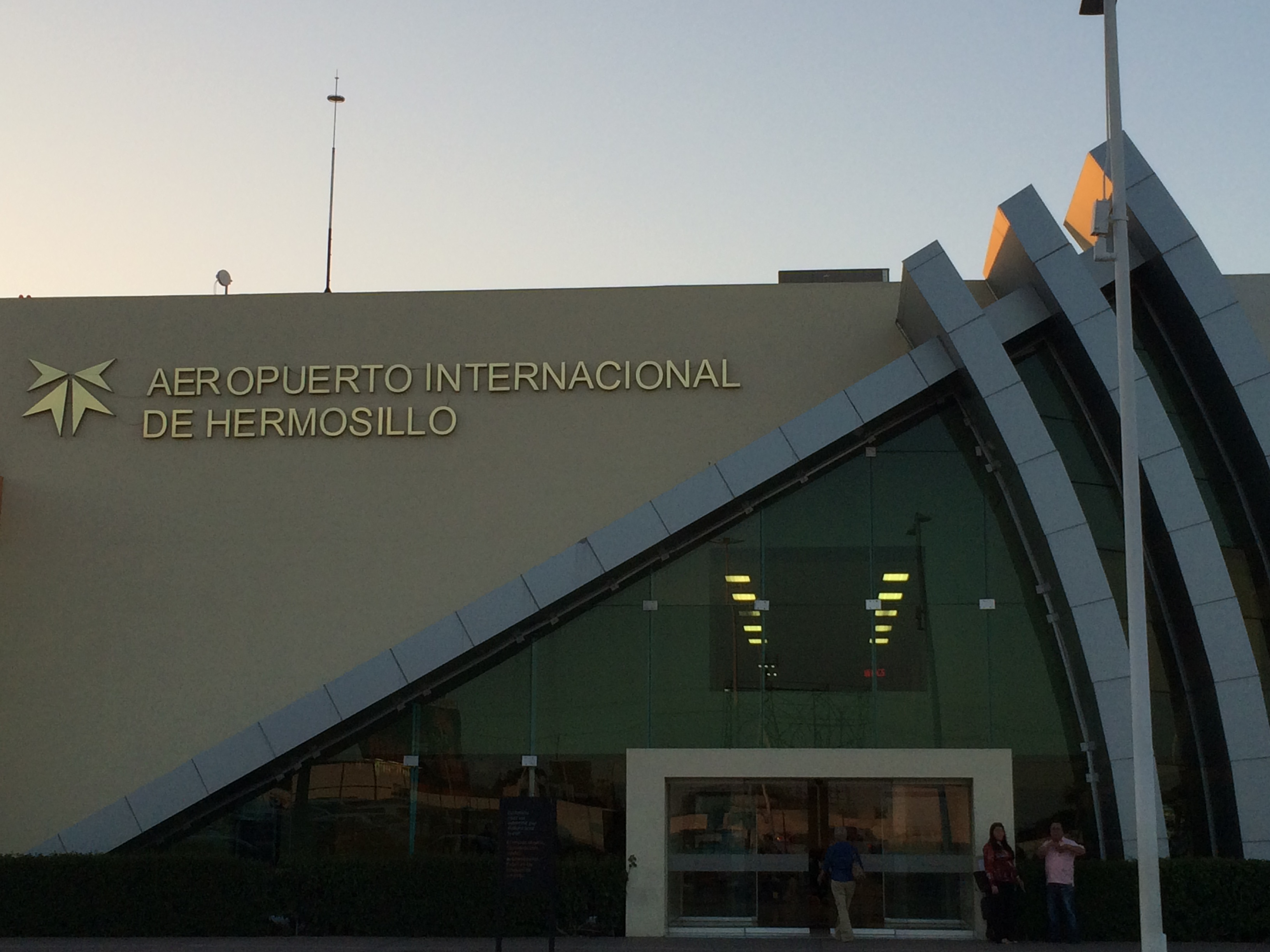
General Ignacio Pesqueira García International Airport

General Ignacio Pesqueira García International Airport is located in the western area of the city. It serves mostly domestic flights to Mexico City, Guadalajara, Tijuana and Monterrey, and has direct international flights to Phoenix. This airport serves approximately 1.2 million passengers annually.

The city has a public transport system concessioned to private hands by the Government of the State of Sonora, which make up the trading company called SICTUHSA, which has a fleet of approximately 350 buses on 19 lines that cover much of the city. The Federal Highway 15 connects Hermosillo with Nogales on a three-hour journey and Culiacán on an eight-hour journey.

== Twin towns and Sister cities ==
- Phoenix, Arizona, United States
- Irvine, California, United States
- Norwalk, California, United States
- Torreón, Coahuila, Mexico
- Riyadh, Saudi Arabia

== Notable people ==
- Juan Ciscomani (b. 1982) – U.S. representative from Arizona
- Cesar Rosas, Mexican-American singer, songwriter and guitarist of the band Los Lobos, was born in Hermosillo.
- Isaac Paredes, Third Baseman for the Houston Astros Major League Baseball team.
- Brandon Valenzuela, Catcher for the Toronto Blue Jays Major League Baseball team.
- Carín León, Regional Mexican singer-songwriter
- Natanael Cano, Regional Mexican singer-songwriter
- Bill Meléndez (1916 - 2008), Mexican-American animator best known for working on the Peanuts animated specials and voicing Snoopy.

== See also ==
- Sonoran hot dog
- Northeast Hermosillo
- List of radio stations in Hermosillo
