= Bacanora =

Liquor

- Origin: Mexico, Sonora
- Ingredients: Agave
- Related products: Pulque, tequila, mezcal

Bacanora is an agave-derived liquor made in the Mexican state of Sonora.

The distillation of Bacanora was illegal until 1992 despite being bootlegged by vinateros for many generations. Since 2000 Bacanora has been a denominación de origen, and thus mezcal can legally be called Bacanora only if produced by the agave variety grown in the Sonora municipalities of Bacanora, Sahuaripa, Arivechi, Soyopa, San Javier, Cumpas, Moctezuma, San Pedro de la Cueva, Tepache, Divisaderos, Granados, Huásabas, Villa Hidalgo, Bacadéhuachi, Nácori Chico, Huachinera, Villa Pesqueira, Aconchi, San Felipe de Jesús, Huépac, Banámichi, Rayón, Baviácora, Opodepe, Arizpe, Rosario de Tesopaco, Quiriego, Suaqui Grande, Onavas, Yécora, Álamos, San Miguel de Horcasitas, Ures, and La Colorada.

== See also ==
- Aguardiente
- Pulque
- Tequila
- Mexican wine
- Mexican beer
- Mexican cuisine
