= Carbó Municipality =

Coordinates: 29.6833°N 110.9500°W

Carbó
- Municipality
- Coat of arms

- Location of the municipality in Sonora
- Country: Mexico
- State: Sonora
- Seat: Carbó
- Time zone: UTC–07:00 (Zona Pacífico)
- Website: carbo.gob.mx

Carbó is a municipality in the state of Sonora in north-western Mexico. The municipal seat is at Carbó.

== Geography ==
The municipality has an area of 1962.66 square kilometers, which is 0.91 percent of the area of the state, and 0.09 percent of the national area of Mexico.

It is located in the west central part of the state of Sonora, at 29° 41' north latitude, and 110° 57' longitude west, at an altitude of 304 meters (997 feet). It borders the following municipalities: Opodepe on the north, Rayón on the east, San Miguel de Horcasitas on the south, Hermosillo on the southeast, and Pitiquito on the northwest. See detailed map at

=== Hydrography ===
Two washes cross the municipality: one named San José del Zanjón, and the other El Pinto. Both run into the San Miguel River, which empties its waters into the Abelardo L. Rodríguez Reservoir in the municipality of Hermosillo.

=== Orography ===
Its territory is mostly a plain inclined upward from west to east. Of note are some hills, and the Cobriza Mountains from north to south.

=== Climate ===
The municipality of Carbó has a hot, very dry climate. The maximum average monthly temperature is 30.5 °C (86.9 °F). in the month of July, and the minimum average monthly temperature is 17.4 °C (61.3 °F) in the month of January. Most rain comes in the months from July to September, and the average annual precipitation is 294 millimeters (11.6 inches.

== Population ==
The municipality's population was 4,966 residents in the year 2000. It had an annual growth rate of 0.8 percent from 1990 to 2000, and the density of population in 2000 was 2.95 residents per square kilometer (7.64 residents per square mile). In the census count of 2005 the population had dropped to 4,644. . The census of 2000 showed that 4,189 people were living in the municipal seat.

== Economy ==
Agriculture occupies first place in the economy, since it generates the greatest number of jobs. The municipality has 32 agricultural fields that are highly developed technically, on which table and juice grapes, peaches, walnuts, and various vegetables and gourds (squash and pumpkins) grow. Most crops are exported to the United States of America.

The principal problem in the public (ejido) sector is that it does not have adequate infrastructure. Also, it does not have access to banking credit.

Ranching is an activity that has become more and more high-tech with good genetic material. The number of cattle has grown to 34,886 head, on 65 properties.

The main problem is the bad roads which access these properties. In the last few years, the amount of buffel grass used to seed pastures has increased by a factor of four. This has considerably increased financial production, and increased ranching activity.

Industrial activity in the municipality is almost nonexistent. There are only packers of table grapes and squash.

A high priority is the creation of a maquiladora (twin plant) which could generate employment mainly for the women of the municipality.
