= Aconchi Municipality =

Coordinates: 29.8247°N 110.2244°W

Aconchi
- Municipality
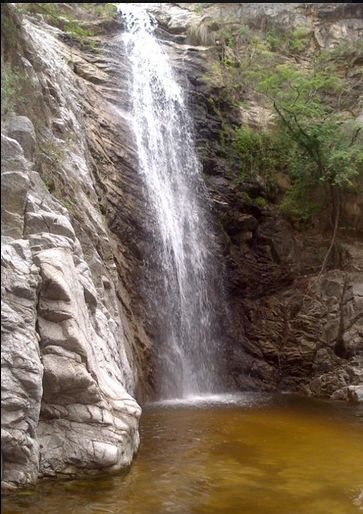
- Thermal waterfall in Aconchi

- Coat of arms

- Location of the municipality in Sonora
- Country: Mexico
- State: Sonora
- Seat: Aconchi

Government
  - Mayor: José Jesús Souffle Enríquez (PRI)

Area
  - Total: 35,874 km^{2} (13,851 sq mi)
- Elevation: 500–2,200 m (1,600–7,200 ft)

Population (2020)
  - Total: 2,563
  - Density: 7.14/km^{2} (18.5/sq mi)
- Time zone: UTC-7 (Zona Pacífico)
- Area code: 623
- INEGI Code: 26001
- Website: aconchisonora.gob.mx

Aconchi is a municipality in the state of Sonora in north-western Mexico.

The municipal seat is at Aconchi.

Neighboring municipalities are Huépac, Cumpas, Ures, Baviácora, Rayón, Banámichi and San Felipe de Jesús.

== Localities ==
The municipality currently is divided into nine inhabited localities:

Locality	Population
Aconchi	1,741
La Estancia	713
San Pablo de Aconchi	145
El Rodeo	26
Maicobabi	5
La Misión	3
La Loma	2
El Ninguno	2
Chavoverachi	1
Total in 2015	2,756
