= Cumpas Municipality =

Cumpas
- Municipality
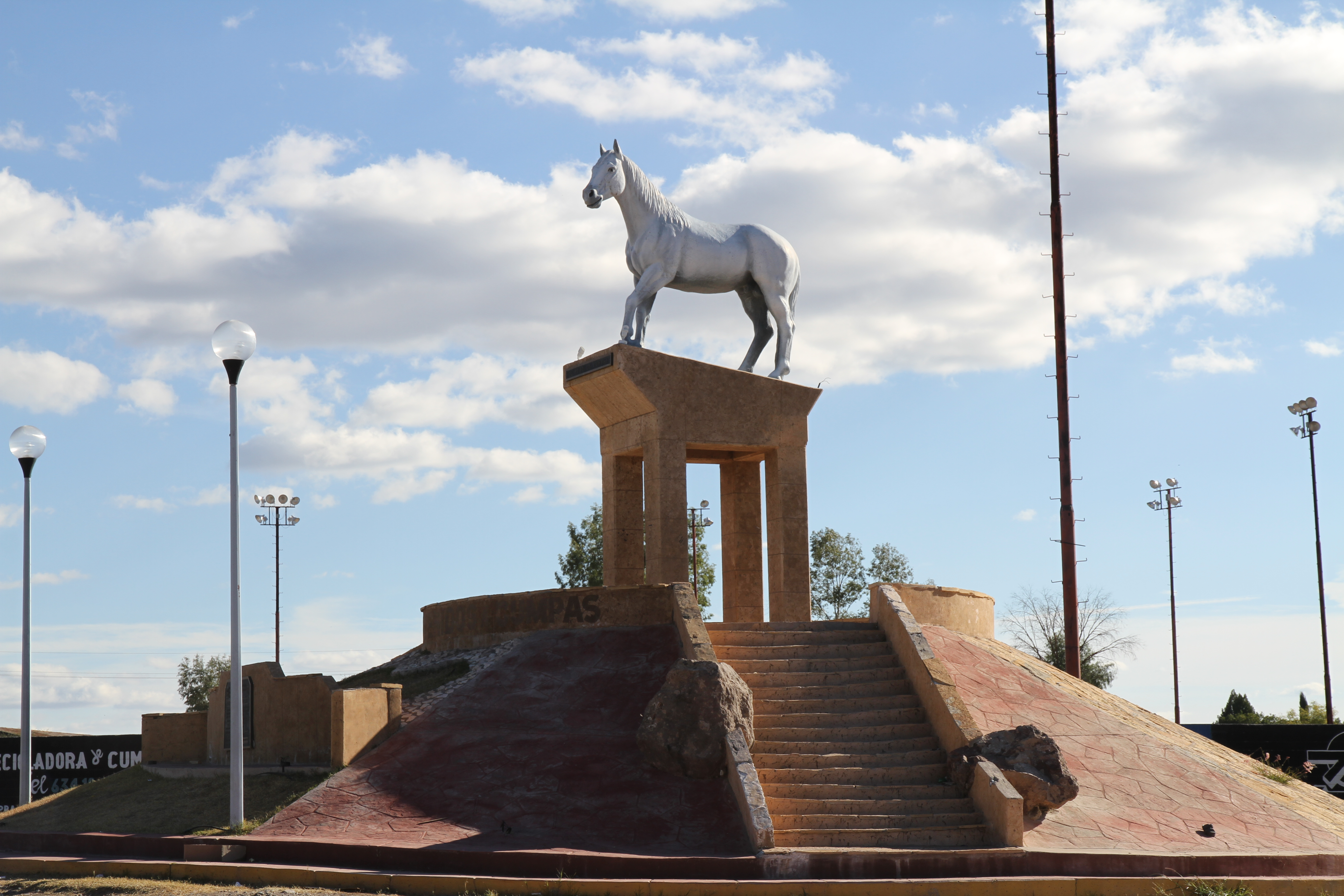

- Coat of arms

- Location of the municipality in Sonora
- Country: Mexico
- State: Sonora
- Seat: Cumpas
- Time zone: UTC-7 (Zona Pacífico)

Cumpas is a municipality in the state of Sonora in north-western Mexico. The municipal seat is at Cumpas.

== Geography ==
The area of the municipality is 2,013.50 km^{2}, which represents 1.09% of the state total and 0.10% of the national total. The most important settlements, besides the municipal seat, are Los Hoyos, Jecori, Ojo de Agua, Kilometro 5 and Teonadepa.

It is located at 30.00°N 109.74°W; at an elevation of 914 meters. Boundaries are with Nacozari de García in the north, Huásabas in the east, Moctezuma in the south, Aconchi in the southwest, Huépac and Banámichi in the west, and Arizpe in the northeast. It is connected to the state capital of Hermosillo by Mex 17.

== Towns and villages ==
The largest localities (cities, towns, and villages) are:

Name	2020 Census population
Cumpas	2,934
Los Hoyos	1,072
Ojo de Agua	597
Jécori	477
Teonadepa	331
La Colonia	201
Total Municipality	5,829

== Population ==
The municipal population was 5,776 in the 2005 count, which shows a decrease from 2000 when the census counted 6,202 inhabitants. The municipal seat had a population of 2809 in 2000.

== Economic activity ==
Agriculture is modest with corn and beans grown for subsistence and grasses grown for cattle fodder. The cattle industry is more important with over 25,000 head counted in the 2000 census. Calves are exported to the United States. Mining is carried out with over 100 workers involved in this activity.

== History ==
Originally the territory was occupied by the Opata teguimes Indians. In 1643 the area was visited by the Italian priest Tomás Basilio, and in 1643 the Jesuit missionary Egidio Monteffio founded the settlement with the name of Nuestra Señora de la Asunción de Cumpas.
