= Huépac Municipality =

Coordinates: 29.9000°N 110.2000°W

Huépac
- Municipality
- Coat of arms

- Location of the municipality in Sonora
- Country: Mexico
- State: Sonora
- Seat: Huépac
- Time zone: UTC-7 (Zona Pacífico)

Huépac is a municipality in the state of Sonora in north-western Mexico.

The municipal seat is at Huépac.

Neighboring municipalities are Banámichi, Cumpas, Aconchi and San Felipe de Jesús. Huépac is connected to Banámichi and Aconchi by a paved highway.
