= 7th federal electoral district of Sonora =

Federal electoral district of Mexico

Sonora's 7th
- Electoral district of the Chamber of Deputies of Mexico

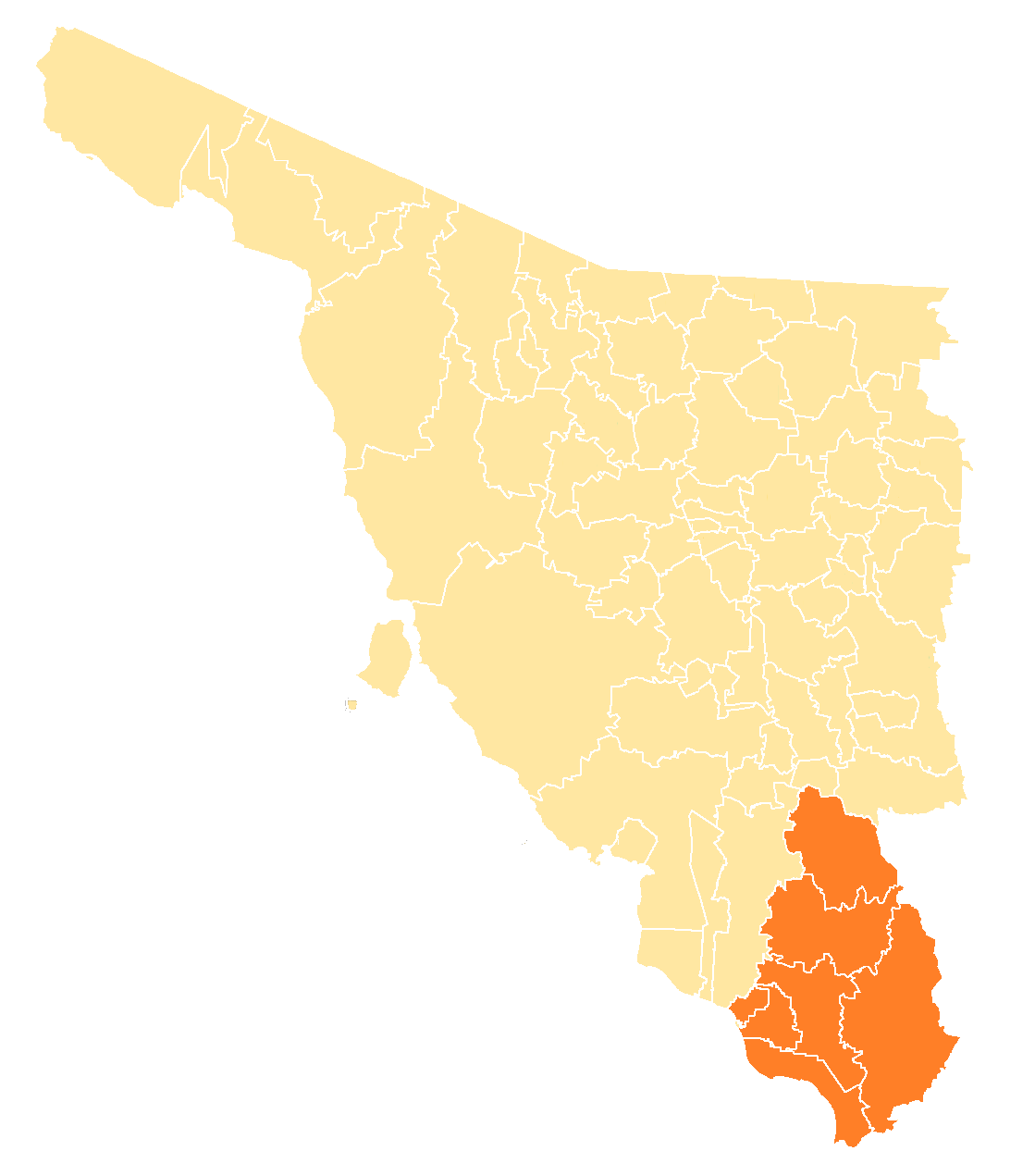
- 7th district since 2005

Incumbent
- Member: Alma Manuela Higuera
- Party: ▌Morena
- Congress: 66th (2024–2027)

District
- State: Sonora
- Head town: Navojoa
- Coordinates: 27°04′N 109°26′W
- Covers: Álamos, Benito Juárez, Etchojoa, Huatabampo, Navojoa, Quiriego, Rosario
- PR region: First
- Precincts: 205
- Population: 358,031 (2020 census)
- Indigenous: Yes (55%)

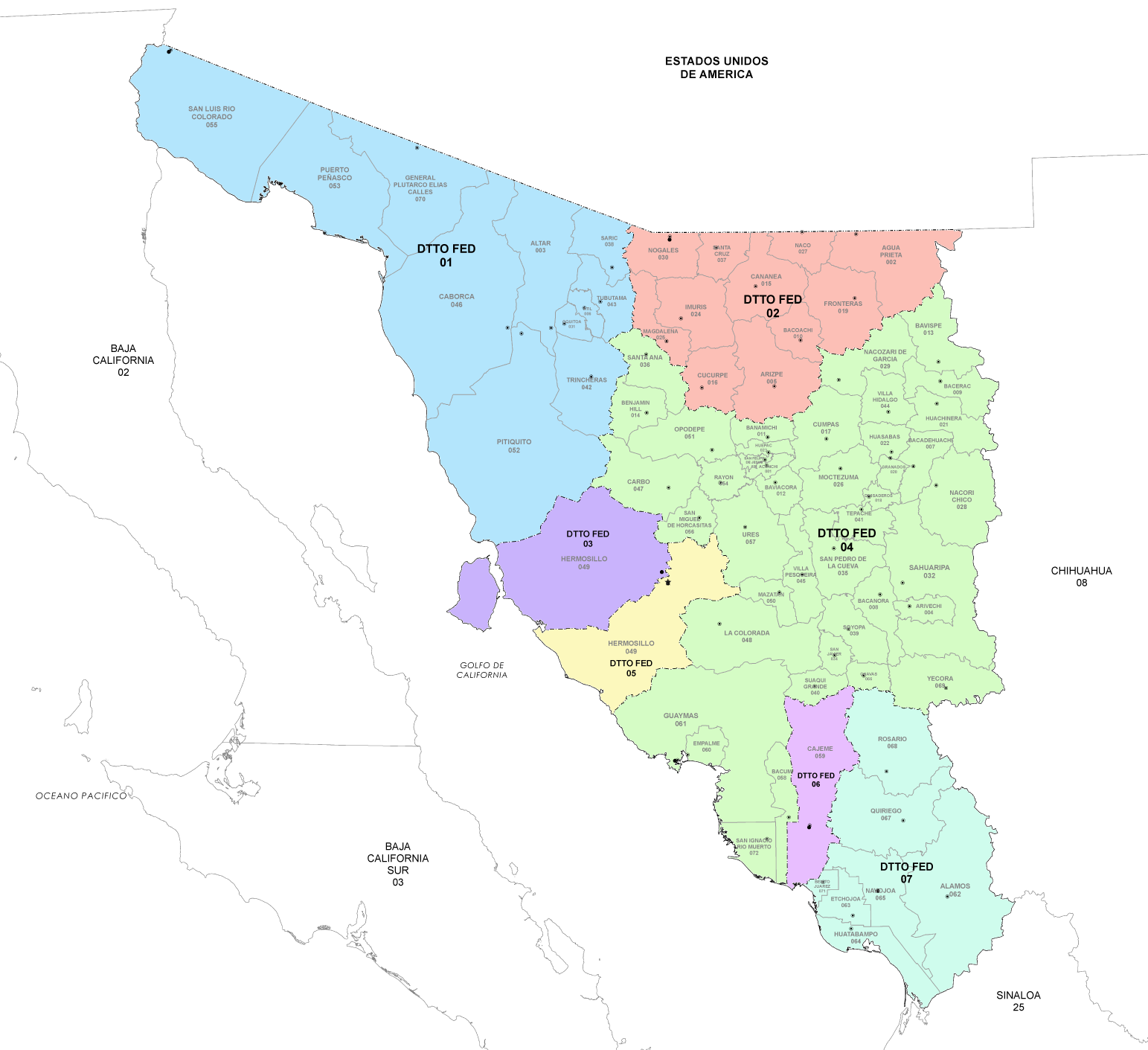
Federal electoral districts of Sonora since 2023

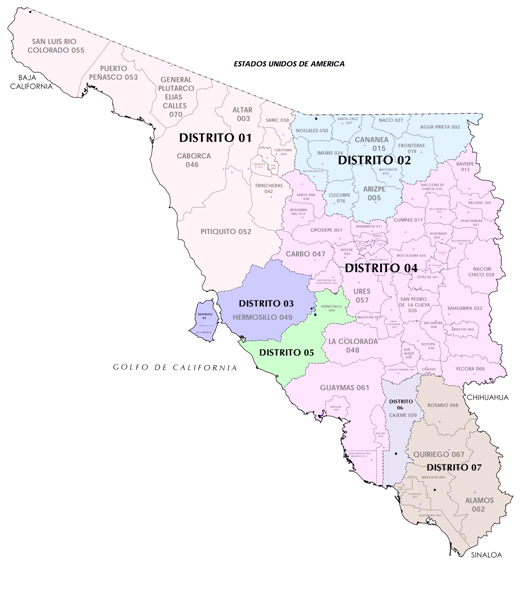
Sonora under the 2017–2022 districting plan

The 7th federal electoral district of Sonora (Spanish: Distrito electoral federal 07 de Sonora) is one of the 300 electoral districts into which Mexico is divided for elections to the federal Chamber of Deputies and one of seven such districts in the state of Sonora.

It elects one deputy to the lower house of Congress for each three-year legislative session by means of the first-past-the-post system. Votes cast in the district also count towards the calculation of proportional representation ("plurinominal") deputies elected from the first region.

The 7th district was created in 1978 and was first contested in the 1979 legislative election.

The current member for the district, elected in the 2024 general election, is Alma Manuela Higuera Esquer of the National Regeneration Movement (Morena).

== District territory ==
Under the 2023 districting plan adopted by the National Electoral Institute (INE), which is to be used for the 2024, 2027 and 2030 federal elections, Sonora's 7th district covers 205 electoral precincts (secciones electorales) across the seven municipalities in the state's south-east:

- Álamos, Benito Juárez, Etchojoa, Huatabampo, Navojoa, Quiriego and Rosario.

The head town (cabecera distrital), where results from individual polling stations are gathered together and tallied, is the city of Navojoa. The district reported a population of 358,031 in the 2020 census and, with Indigenous and Afrodescendent inhabitants accounting for over 55% of that total, it is classified by the National Electoral Institute (INE) as an indigenous district – the only indigenous federal electoral district in the state. (Note: The INE deems any local or federal electoral district where Indigenous or Afrodescendent inhabitants number 40% or more of the population to be an indigenous district.)

== Previous districting schemes ==
Evolution of electoral district numbers
	1974	1978	1996	2005	2017	2023
Sonora	4	7	7	7	7	7
Chamber of Deputies	196	300				

2005–2022

In the 2017 and 2005 districting plans, the 7th district had the same configuration as at present.

1996–2005

Under the 1996 plan, it covered only the five southernmost municipalities: Rosario was assigned to the 4th district, and Benito Juárez was at the time part of Etchojoa.

1978–1996

The districting scheme in force from 1978 to 1996 was the result of the 1977 electoral reforms, which increased the number of single-member seats in the Chamber of Deputies from 196 to 300. Under that plan, Sonora's seat allocation rose from four to seven. The newly created 7th district comprised the municipality of Cajeme.

== Deputies returned to Congress ==
(Mexico) National parties
- Current
- PAN
- PRI
- PT
- PVEM
- MC
- Morena
- PAZ
- Somos
- Defunct or local only
- PLM
- PNR
- PRM
- PNM
- PP
- PPS
- PARM
- PFCRN
- CON
- PANAL
- PSD
- PES
- PES
- PRD

Sonora's 7th district
Election	Deputy	Party	Term	Legislature
1979	Carlos Amaya Rivera	National Action Party (Mexico)	1979–1982	51st Congress
1982	Ramiro Valdez Fontes	Institutional Revolutionary Party	1982–1985	52nd Congress
1985	Francisco Villanueva Casteló	Institutional Revolutionary Party	1985–1988	53nd Congress
1988	Ramiro Valdez Fontes	Institutional Revolutionary Party	1988–1991	54th Congress
1991	Miguel Ángel Murillo Aispuro	Institutional Revolutionary Party	1991–1994	55th Congress
1994	Juan Leyva Mendívil	Institutional Revolutionary Party	1994–1997	56th Congress
1997	Luis Meneses Murillo	Party of the Democratic Revolution	1997–2000	57th Congress
2000	Arturo León Lerma	Institutional Revolutionary Party	2000–2003	58th Congress
2003	Guadalupe Mendívil Morales	Institutional Revolutionary Party	2003–2006	59th Congress
2006	Gustavo Mendívil Amparán	Institutional Revolutionary Party	2006–2009	60th Congress
2009	Onésimo Mariscales Delgadillo	Institutional Revolutionary Party	2009–2012	61st Congress
2012	Máximo Othón Zayas	National Action Party (Mexico)	2012–2015	62nd Congress
2015	Próspero Manuel Ibarra Otero	Institutional Revolutionary Party	2015–2018	63rd Congress
2018	Hildelisa González Morales	Labour Party (Mexico)	2018–2021	64th Congress
2021	Shirley Guadalupe Vázquez Romero	Labour Party (Mexico)	2021–2024	65th Congress
2024	Alma Manuela Higuera Esquer	National Regeneration Movement	2024–2027	66th Congress

== Presidential elections ==
Sonora's 7th district
Election	District won by	Party or coalition	%
2018	Andrés Manuel López Obrador	Juntos Haremos Historia	63.2820
2024	Claudia Sheinbaum Pardo	Sigamos Haciendo Historia	73.1770
