= Carbó =

Village in Sonora, Mexico

Coordinates: 29.6833°N 110.95°W

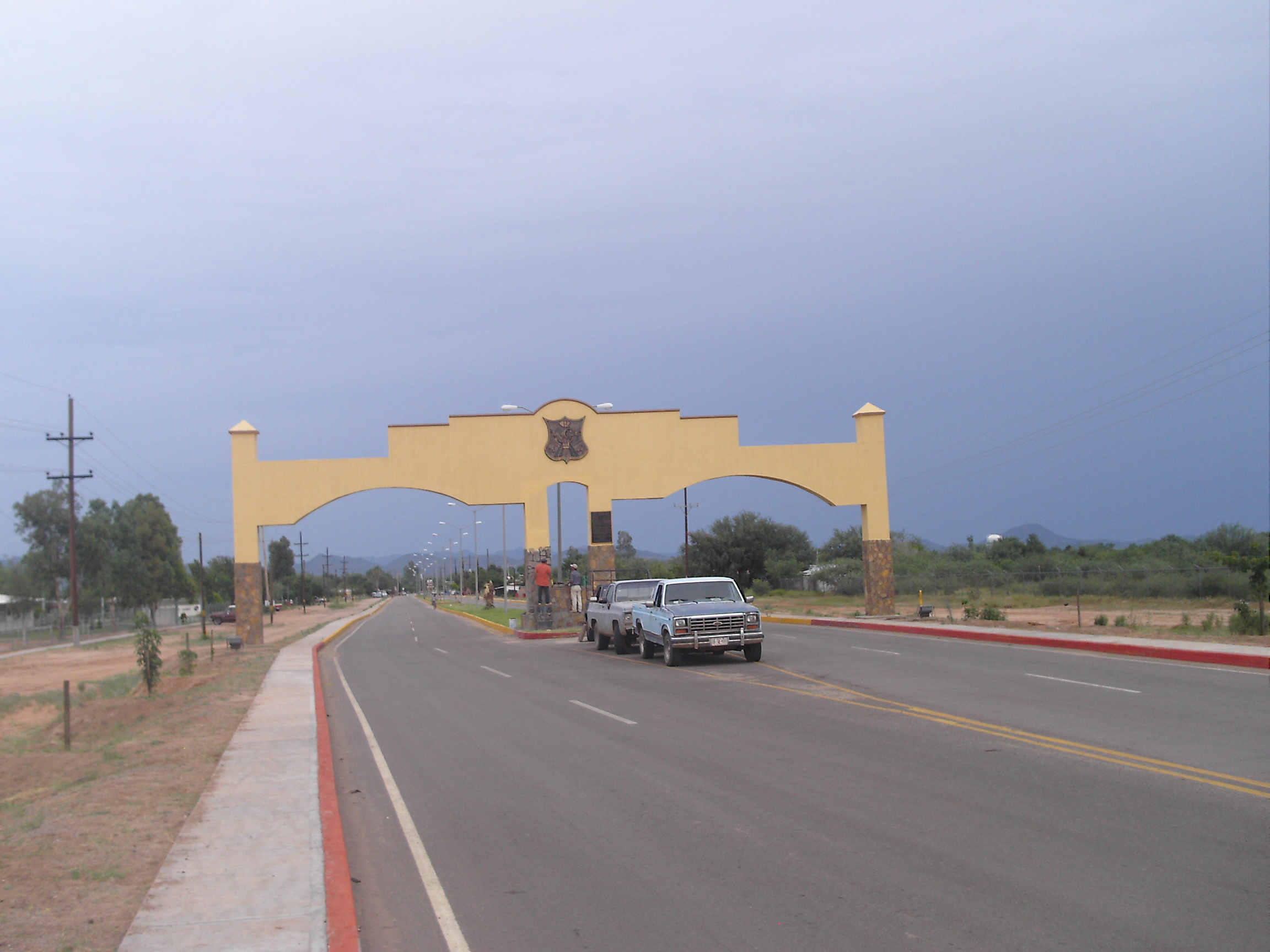
Main Entrance of Carbó

Carbó is the municipal seat of Carbó Municipality of the state of Sonora, Mexico.

== History ==
The founding dates from 1888, when the main railroad in Sonora began to be constructed. Carbó was one of the stations built between the port of Guaymas and the border town of Nogales. The settlement of Carbó started its life as an important supply station, supplying the merchants who came to the mines in the neighboring region of Rayón, Opodepe, and Valle de San Miguel.

The settlement first became a municipal seat in 1943, when the state legislature separated it and other localities from the municipality of San Miguel de Horcasitas. It was reincorporated into San Miguel de Horcasitas in the same year, and was permanently made a municipality of its own by Law No. 9 on December 15, 1952. Its name honors the Oaxacan José Guillermo Carbó, who became the military commander of Sonora in 1878, and helped the legislature remove governor Mariscal from power in Sonora in 1879.

== Climate ==
Climate data for Carbó (1991–2020 normals, extremes 1960–present)
Month	Jan	Feb	Mar	Apr	May	Jun	Jul	Aug	Sep	Oct	Nov	Dec	Year
Record high °C (°F)	35 (95)	39 (102)	39.5 (103.1)	42 (108)	47 (117)	47.5 (117.5)	47 (117)	45 (113)	46 (115)	42 (108)	39 (102)	42 (108)	47.5 (117.5)
Mean daily maximum °C (°F)	23.6 (74.5)	24.7 (76.5)	27.7 (81.9)	31.0 (87.8)	34.4 (93.9)	38.8 (101.8)	37.8 (100.0)	37.0 (98.6)	36.0 (96.8)	32.8 (91.0)	27.7 (81.9)	23.2 (73.8)	31.2 (88.2)
Daily mean °C (°F)	14.6 (58.3)	15.6 (60.1)	18.1 (64.6)	20.8 (69.4)	24.1 (75.4)	29.0 (84.2)	30.4 (86.7)	29.8 (85.6)	28.1 (82.6)	23.5 (74.3)	18.4 (65.1)	14.4 (57.9)	22.2 (72.0)
Mean daily minimum °C (°F)	5.5 (41.9)	6.5 (43.7)	8.5 (47.3)	10.6 (51.1)	13.8 (56.8)	19.2 (66.6)	23.0 (73.4)	22.6 (72.7)	20.2 (68.4)	14.2 (57.6)	9.0 (48.2)	5.6 (42.1)	13.2 (55.8)
Record low °C (°F)	−5 (23)	−7 (19)	−1 (30)	1 (34)	4.5 (40.1)	10 (50)	8 (46)	14 (57)	9 (48)	2 (36)	−1 (30)	−6 (21)	−7 (19)
Average precipitation mm (inches)	18.6 (0.73)	15.4 (0.61)	9.2 (0.36)	2.0 (0.08)	1.7 (0.07)	8.9 (0.35)	91.0 (3.58)	102.8 (4.05)	62.1 (2.44)	19.7 (0.78)	17.4 (0.69)	23.3 (0.92)	372.1 (14.65)
Average rainy days	2.0	1.9	1.2	0.3	0.2	1.2	7.4	7.6	4.2	1.4	1.4	2.2	31.0
Source: Servicio Meteorológico Nacional
