= San Felipe de Jesús =

San Felipe de Jesús, Philip of Jesus in Spanish, may refer to

- San Felipe de Jesús Municipality, Sonora, Mexico
  - San Felipe de Jesús, Sonora, its municipal seat
- San Felipe de Jesús Tianguis, a public market in Mexico City
