= La Estancia =

La Estancia may refer to:

- La Estancia, Sonora, Mexico
- La Estancia, El Salvador
- La Estancia de gaucho Cruz, a 1938 Argentine comedy film

== See also ==
- Estancia (disambiguation)
