= San Felipe de Jesús Municipality =

Coordinates: 29.8643°N 110.3270°W

San Felipe de Jesús
- Municipality
- Coat of arms
- Interactive map of San Felipe de Jesús
- Country: Mexico
- State: Sonora
- Seat: San Felipe de Jesús
- Time zone: UTC-7 (Zona Pacífico)

San Felipe de Jesús is a municipality in the state of Sonora in northwestern Mexico, being the smallest municipality in Sonora. The municipal seat is at San Felipe de Jesús.

The municipal area is 152.8 km^{2}, with a population of 416 registered in 2000.

Neighboring municipalities are Banámichi, Aconchi, Opodepe, and Huépac.
