= Las Delicias =

Las Delicias may refer to:

- Las Delicias, Baja California, Mexico
- Las Delicias, Sonora, Mexico
- Las Delicias, Bocas del Toro, Panama
- Las Delicias, Trujillo, La Libertad Region, Peru
- Las Delicias (Madrid), a ward (barrio) of Madrid, Spain
- Estadio Las Delicias, stadium in El Salvador
- Plaza Las Delicias, plaza in Ponce, Puerto Rico

== See also ==
- El jardín de las delicias, 1970 Spanish film
- Delicias (disambiguation)
