= Doctors for Global Health =

Nonprofit organization

- Abbreviation: DGH
- Founded: 1995
- Type: NGO
- Purpose: Community healthcare, education, human rights
- Website: dghonline.org

Doctors for Global Health (DGH) is a private, not-for-profit, non-governmental organization promoting health, education, art and other human rights throughout the world.

DGH's stated mission is "To improve health and foster other human rights with those most in need by accompanying communities, while educating and inspiring others to action." The work of this organization is guided by a series of core values outlined in the DGH Principles of Action document.

== History ==
=== The El Salvador Civil War ===
From 1979 to 1992, widespread violence swept over El Salvador, immersed at the time in a brutal civil war. The decade-long war produced devastating effects throughout the country, during which countless violations of human rights were perpetuated, with more than 75,000 people killed, and many others disappeared or forced into exile.

The civilian population of many guerrilla-controlled areas were assumed the enemy and suffered brutal war crimes, murders, killings and disappearances. One of these war-torn areas was the department of Morazán in northeastern El Salvador. It was in this isolated region that, in the aftermath of the war, several medical volunteers with Medecins du Monde were accompanying local communities, working on a "Health as Reconciliation project", rebuilding lives and working with health promoters.

The community work inspired a new discipline called Liberation Medicine, and resulted in the creation of the Salvadoran association Campesinos para el Desarrollo Humano (Peasants for Human Development). Dr. Lanny Smith was among the group of volunteers accompanying these communities who concluded that a new organization was needed to attend to the needs of these people in their struggle to implement primary health care and public health services. In July 1995, DGH was founded and incorporated in Georgia as a 501(C)3 tax-exempt charitable organization. The foundation of DGH was underpinned by a philosophy that stressed the promotion of health and human rights around the globe.

== Overview ==
Hundreds of people of varied backgrounds and areas of expertise have assisted with the work of DGH both at home and abroad, including health workers, teachers, artists, students, and many others. Today, with a global membership of over 5000 people, DGH offers many opportunities for people to participate in its mission to improve health and social justice around the world, both locally and internationally.

=== Organizational structure ===
DGH is an all-volunteer 501(c)3 NGO founded in 1995 and based in Atlanta, Georgia. There is no office or paid staff in the US; phone, fax, and travel expenses to volunteer overseas, attend board meetings and the Annual DGH General Assembly are all donated. Board members and members from around the world carry out the work of the organization, both domestically (e.g. through committee work) and internationally. The board of directors, international volunteers, and general membership include health providers (doctors, nurses, physical and occupational therapists, paramedics, and students in these disciplines), teachers, psychologists, engineers, artists, lawyers, and dedicated people from all walks of life.

Anyone who agrees with and affirms DGH's mission and principles can become a member. There is no membership fee. A DGH member who has been actively involved in the organization for at least a year, upon approval by the board, can become a voting member.

DGH has a very active 18-member board and up to three board alternates who are elected by the DGH voting membership to serve 3-year terms. Six board members are elected each year to provide continuity while allowing new board members to be elected. Board members convene biannual board meetings in addition to monthly conference calls.

=== Funding ===
As a registered charity, DGH mainly receives funds from individual donors who support its mission and goals. DGH is also supported by private foundations. DGH follows specific guidelines regarding foundation and corporate support that reflect the DGH principles of action, which state that 'DGH is vigilant to ensure that its projects, programs, affiliations, and fund raising efforts don't involve even subtle compromise of its values.' DGH does not seek any government funds and does not allow more than thirty percent of funding to come from any one source. Board members and international volunteers pay all of their own expenses, including airfare, room and board. This allows 92 percent of DGH funds to go directly to its program activities.

== Organizational philosophy ==
=== Principles of Action ===
DGH has its own principles of action, which outline the basics of the organization's values, among these 10 principles are references to the use of artistic expression within the organization's work and commitments towards advocacy and social justice. Guided by these principles, DGH works locally and internationally at the synergy of health, human rights, education and art

What's unique about our work and philosophy is the combined emphasis on health and human rights and our commitment to long-term accompaniment of the communities we support. We only work where we are invited and we try our best to 'accompany' communities and support them in pursuing the goal of better health without imposing our own views of how to achieve the goals.

=== Liberation Medicine ===
DGH defends an inextricable link between health and human rights through the practice of "liberation medicine", defined as "The conscious, conscientious use of health to promote human dignity and social justice."

DGH uses liberation medicine as a means to seek ways for making a concrete, positive difference in people's lives by accompanying them in the process of attaining their own freedom and life-improvement, not 'liberating' them.

The distinction between liberation and development is important to the work of DGH. Development has acquired a negative connotation in recent years because it usually implies a connection to groups that are closely tied to organizations and governments that control the world economy. DGH employs liberation medicine so that the poor can decide what they need and are empowered to explore different ways of achieving their goals. Once the poor are empowered, true development and liberation for health and healing can occur. By using studied action, DGH seeks ways for making a concrete, positive difference in people's lives by accompanying them in the process of attaining their own freedom and life-improvement, not 'liberating' them. Central to the concept of Liberation Medicine is the act of community accompaniment and treating people with respect.

Members of the DGH community have been instrumental in presenting the ideals of Liberation Medicine at many venues. For example, DGH members conducted the first comprehensive Liberation Medicine Workshop at the American Public Health Association (APHA) Annual Conference in 1999. DGH has organized workshops and presentations on Liberation Medicine at subsequent APHA conferences, as well as at many other meetings and universities around the world.

=== Community Accompaniment ===
DGH works with marginalized populations through community accompaniment. According to DGH, this term implies "being invited rather than arriving without prior community knowledge or approval, as well as a participatory process with the community rather than imposing our way of thinking or doing things." DGH only works in areas where it has received a written invitation by the local population, who determine their own priorities.

The combination of capacity-building and friendship-building of volunteers is an essential component of the organization, which can be differentiated by the work of other organizations in that it seeks to build long-term solutions with communities where DGH is invited to work.

=== Advocacy ===
DGH works with its global partners and other organizations to bear witness for human rights and against human rights violations. Advocacy work is carried out through various means including educational articles, position statements, and activism. As stated on the official organization webpage, DGH prioritizes its work to focus on the following:

- Human rights violations and local policies that negatively influence or affect the communities that we accompany;
- Universal health care access. We join in solidarity with groups with which we are affiliated and support and encourage the advocacy work of the People's Health Movement to promote the right to health care for all in our own country and abroad;
- Highlight the human and other costs of wars, and gross human rights violations by the United States;
- Immigration issues nationally and internationally.

The DGH Human Rights and Advocacy Committee leads an ongoing series of campaigns on these and other topics. Recently, DGH has joined in letters of solidarity and action items for death threats and assassinations of community activists in El Salvador. DGH supports the DREAM Act and other immigrants' rights issues, supports the work of SOA Watch, Office of the Americas and others in the peace movement, and believes healthcare is a human right for all. DGH strongly supports the Occupy Wall Street Movement, and its members are involved in Occupy Public Health.

== Projects and worldwide activities ==
=== Morazan, El Salvador ===
DGH was born out of work that began in the communities of La Estancia, El Salvador in the mid-1990s. This remote mountainous area was heavily affected by loss and destruction during the country's twelve-year civil war. In 2001, members of the community joined to form La Asociación de Campesinos para el Desarrollo Humano (Peasants for Human Development, C.D.H.), which was officially recognized as a Salvadoran nonprofit organization in August 2004. Today, DGH supports C.D.H. as it runs the local community health center and six early childhood development centers as well as broader community health and development projects.

=== Santa Marta, El Salvador ===
Santa Marta is a rural community in the Department of Cabañas. DGH supports the work of the Community Rehabilitation Center, currently managed by two community health promoters. The center has evolved since the 1990s to provide a wide array of services including physical therapy and other body work techniques, specifically developed to address the needs of war wounded, injured, and people suffering from chronic musculoskeletal conditions. DGH has consistently provided volunteer medical students and other health care providers to work alongside Salvadoran physicians, health promoters, and other staff at the Ministry of Health Clinic. Additionally, DGH also raises funds for COCOSI (COmite COntra SIda), a youth led organization which uses theater and role playing to educate their peers and adults on the risk of HIV and sexually transmitted disease, together with gender related issues. Recently, COCOSI received international recognition for their work when they were awarded the 2010 Red Ribbon Award as a group demonstrating outstanding community leadership and action in reducing the spread and impact of AIDS.

=== Chiapas, Mexico ===
DGH has been present in Chiapas since receiving an invitation by the local community in 1996. Here, DGH works with 6 of the Zapatista autonomous municipalities. The work consists of teaching health promoters and conducting public health work, together with an in-country coordinator: Dr. Juan Manuel Canales. The 2006 Jonathan Mann Award for Health and Human Rights was recently awarded to Dr Canales for his lifelong dedication to building community health services and speaking out against the violations of human rights among marginalized and excluded communities.

=== Uganda ===
DGH has been involved in Southwest Uganda since 1999, when it partnered with the Mbarara University of Science and Technology (MUST), one of only 2 Ugandan medical schools at that time. Today, the DGH collaboration currently sponsors a range of initiatives, including nursing and village health worker programs as well as cervical cancer screening, psychiatry and disability initiatives.

=== Oaxaca ===
In Tehuantepec, Oaxaca, Doctors for Global Health works in partnership with El Centro Popular de Apoyo y Formación para La Salud (CEPAFOS- The Community Center for Health Training and Support). For over two decades, CEPAFOS has provided greatly needed health services to the marginalized populations of the Isthmus of Tehuantepec, recovering ancestral knowledge of medicinal plants and natural therapies, and organizing and training groups of health promoters throughout the diverse regions of the Isthmus. Ongoing health promoter training takes place in 6 geographic regions, with over 150 health promoters. There is also a medical clinic in the city of Tehuantepec which offers allopathic medical care integrated with indigenous medicines and therapies such as massage and acupuncture. The promotion of traditional healing practices as natural and inexpensive alternatives to conventional medicine is the cornerstone of the vision of CEPAFOS to empower communities to strengthen their own wellbeing, and embodies the mission to put "la salud en manos del pueblo"

=== United States – education and advocacy ===
In the United States, DGH offers many opportunities to volunteer for the organization on a local level. Domestic volunteers can dedicate their time to the work of different committees such as the Development and Finance Committee, the Human Rights and Advocacy Committee, the Communications Committee or the International Volunteer Committee. Additionally, DGH promotes the work of local groups in the US. The Tulane University School of Medicine student branch takes part in volunteer activities throughout the community and hosts educational events at the Medical and Public Health Schools. DGH-Los Angeles continues to work with other advocacy groups locally on immigrants' rights issues, the peace movement, and campaigns to advance healthcare for all.

=== Europe ===
In 2007, DGH members in Europe convened to form 'DGH-Europe'. The primary goal of the group is to support the work of DGH by taking action at a local level and to promote the organization in Europe, building networks with other like-minded groups. DGH-Europe is committed to raising funds to support existing projects and to assist in the recruitment of volunteers. DGH-Europe has hosted a number of events in France, Italy and Spain.

== Affiliations ==
People's Health Movement: In December 2000, five representatives from DGH traveled to Bangladesh to join over 1,500 activists from more than 94 countries in the first People's Health Assembly. The gathering culminated in the writing of the People's Charter for Health, of which DGH was a co-signer.

DGH continues to work closely with People's Health Movement to promote human rights internationally.

DGH works jointly with members of the Italian NGO Psicologi per I Popoli on several projects focused on improving the mental health of the communities in which DGH has a presence.
