= Rosario de Tesopaco Municipality =

Coordinates: 28.0176°N 109.3074°W

Rosario de Tesopaco
- Municipality
- Interactive map of Rosario de Tesopaco
- Country: Mexico
- State: Sonora
- Seat: Rosario de Tesopaco

Population (2020)
  - Total: 4,830
- Time zone: UTC-7 (Zona Pacífico)

Rosario de Tesopaco is a municipality in Sonora in north-western Mexico. The municipal seat is at Rosario de Tesopaco.

== Area and population ==
The municipal area is 3,301.90 km^{2} with a population of 5,432 registered in 2000. The population of the municipal seat was 2,649 in 2000. It is located at an elevation of 450 meters.

== Neighboring municipalities ==
Neighboring municipalities are:

- State of Chihuahua and Yécora—northeast
- Aconchi—east
- Álamos—southeast
- Quiriego—south
- Cajeme—west
