= DGH (disambiguation) =

dGH is a unit of water quality.

DGH may refer to:

- Denver General Hospital, Colorado, US (1923–1997)
- Dghwede language, spoken in Borno, Nigeria
- Directorate General of Highways, Taiwan (1943–1999)
- District general hospital, a medical facility type
- Doctors for Global Health, a non-profit (formed 1995)
