= Quiriego =

Coordinates: 27°31′N 109°16′W

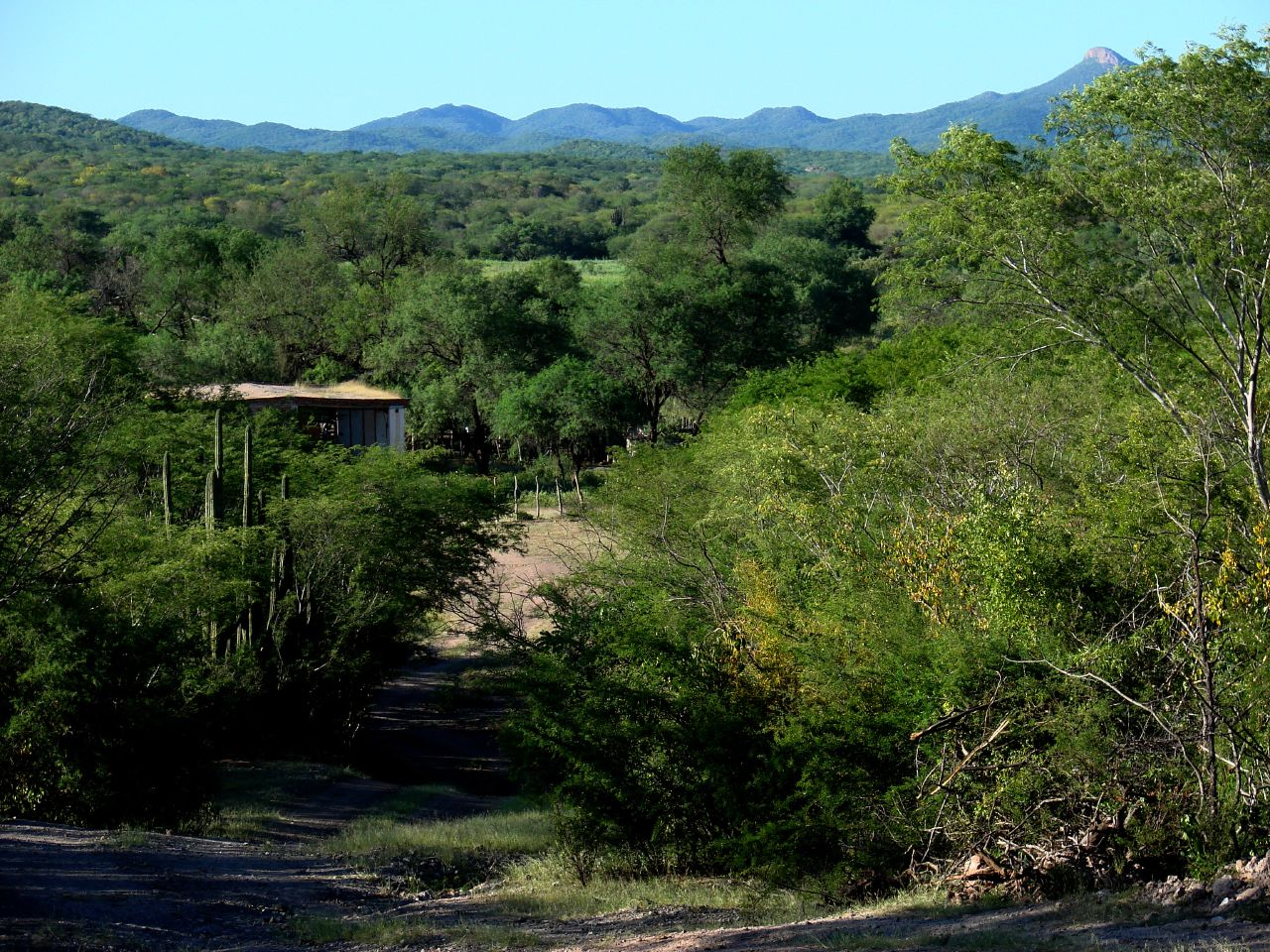
Quiriego, Sonora

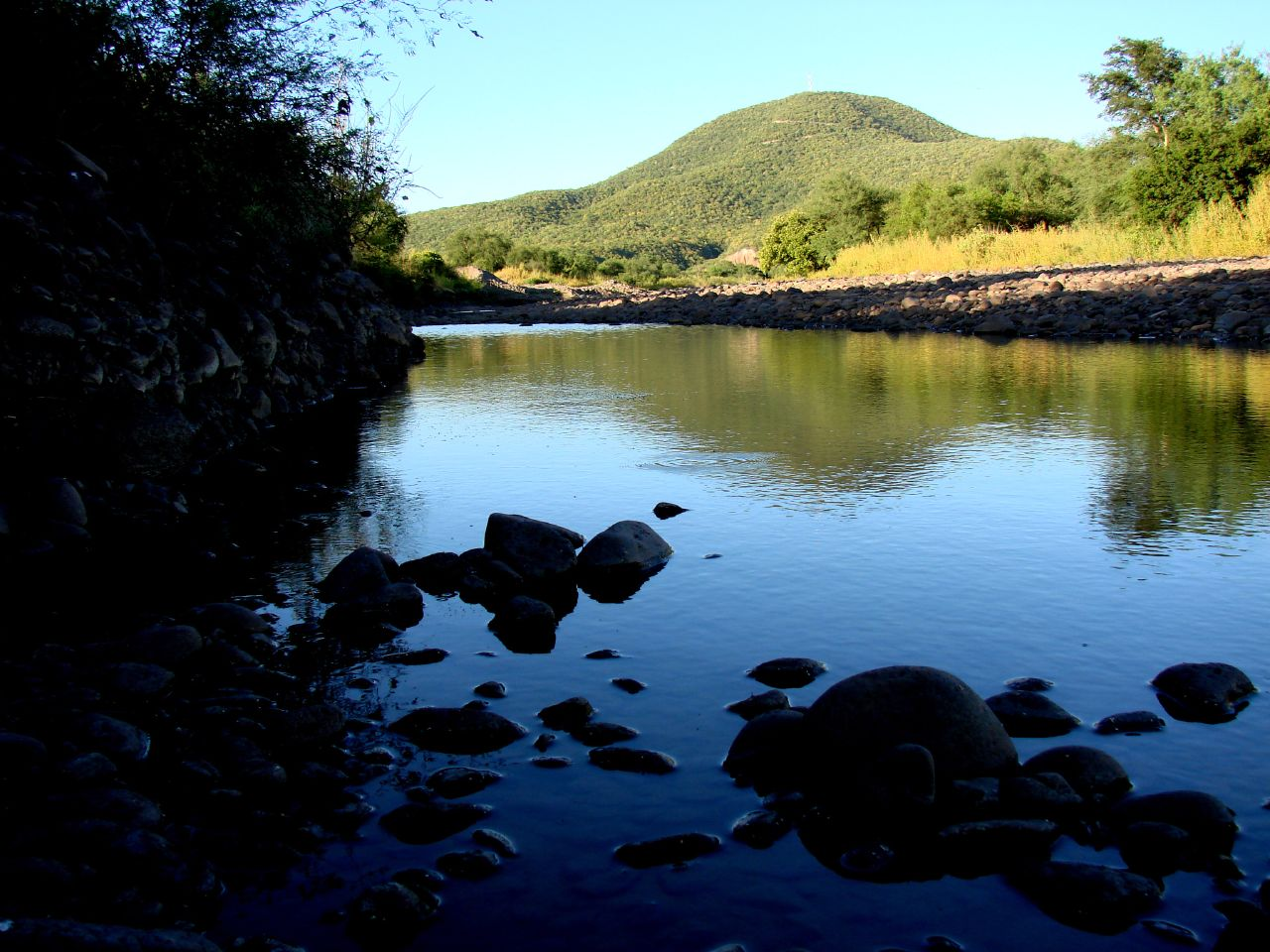
Quiriego municipio

Quiriego is a small town and the county seat of the Municipality of Quiriego, located in the southeast of the Mexican state of Sonora.

== Geography ==
The Quiriego Municipality area is 2,705.72 km^{2} (1,044.68 sq mi). The town is located at an elevation of 822 m (2,697 ft).

Quiriego is located east of Ciudad Obregón and is connected by dirt road with the main Federal Highway 15 at the village of Fundición.

=== Neighboring municipalities ===
Neighboring municipalities are Rosario to the north, Álamos to the east, Navojoa and the state of Chihuahua to the south and Cajeme to the west.

=== Climate ===
Climate data for Quiriego (1991–2020 normals, extremes 1927–present)
Month	Jan	Feb	Mar	Apr	May	Jun	Jul	Aug	Sep	Oct	Nov	Dec	Year
Record high °C (°F)	39 (102)	41 (106)	49.5 (121.1)	47 (117)	49 (120)	49.5 (121.1)	50 (122)	49.5 (121.1)	49.5 (121.1)	45 (113)	42 (108)	40 (104)	50 (122)
Mean daily maximum °C (°F)	26.8 (80.2)	28.0 (82.4)	31.3 (88.3)	34.6 (94.3)	38.0 (100.4)	41.0 (105.8)	38.3 (100.9)	36.1 (97.0)	35.5 (95.9)	34.4 (93.9)	29.9 (85.8)	25.6 (78.1)	33.3 (91.9)
Daily mean °C (°F)	16.3 (61.3)	17.6 (63.7)	19.9 (67.8)	22.6 (72.7)	26.1 (79.0)	31.1 (88.0)	30.8 (87.4)	29.3 (84.7)	28.5 (83.3)	25.5 (77.9)	20.0 (68.0)	15.9 (60.6)	23.6 (74.5)
Mean daily minimum °C (°F)	5.8 (42.4)	7.2 (45.0)	8.5 (47.3)	10.7 (51.3)	14.3 (57.7)	21.2 (70.2)	23.3 (73.9)	22.6 (72.7)	21.5 (70.7)	16.6 (61.9)	10.1 (50.2)	6.1 (43.0)	14.0 (57.2)
Record low °C (°F)	−6.5 (20.3)	−5 (23)	−7 (19)	1 (34)	1.2 (34.2)	9 (48)	13 (55)	14 (57)	7 (45)	4 (39)	−3.5 (25.7)	−9 (16)	−9 (16)
Average precipitation mm (inches)	23.6 (0.93)	18.5 (0.73)	8.1 (0.32)	2.1 (0.08)	4.2 (0.17)	27.7 (1.09)	165.8 (6.53)	200.4 (7.89)	124.1 (4.89)	39.3 (1.55)	17.5 (0.69)	23.9 (0.94)	655.2 (25.80)
Average rainy days	1.9	2.1	1.6	0.7	0.6	3.2	13.4	12.2	7.9	3.0	2.4	2.9	51.9
Source: Servicio Meteorológico Nacional

== Population ==
The Quiriego Municipality population count was 3,335 in 2005. The population of the town of Quiriego, its main settlement and municipal seat, was 994 in 2000. The municipal population has been decreasing steadily since 1980 when it was 4,474.

== History ==
The name Quiriego comes from the Latin words in the liturgy of the mass "Kyrie" lord and "ego" I.

Located in this region are the ruins of the ancient Real de Minas y Villa de Baroyeca, which was one of the most important settlements in Sonora during the colonial period and beginning of the post-independence era.

Ruins of the former missions of Batacosa and Tepahui, founded in the eighteenth century, can also be seen.

The municipal seat, Quiriego, was originally a ranch belonging to Francisco Javier Valenzuela in the last years of the eighteenth century. Quiriego became a municipality in 1932.

== Economy ==
Agriculture and cattle raising are the main economic activities. Main crops are watermelon, sorghum, corn, beans, and grasses for cattle raising. There were 34,096 head of cattle in 2000.
