= Estancia (disambiguation) =

Estancia is a Spanish term referencing a large rural estate. It may also refer to:

== Places ==
- Estancia, New Mexico
- Estancia, Iloilo
- Estância, Sergipe
- Estância Velha
- Microregion of Estância (pt)
- Estacia, a municipality of Santa Bárbara Department, Honduras

== Other uses ==
- Estancia, a ballet by Alberto Ginastera

== See also ==
- La Estancia (disambiguation)
- Roman Catholic Diocese of Estância
- Estancia High School
