= Las Delicias, Sonora =

Las Delicias
- Ejido
- Location within Sonora Location within Mexico
- Coordinates: 29°58′46″N 110°13′23″W
- Country: Mexico
- State: Sonora
- Municipality: Banámichi
- Established: 30 April 1934
- Time zone: UTC-7 (Zona Pacífico)
- Postal code: 84895
- LADA: 623

Las Delicias is an ejido located in the municipality of Banámichi in the centre of the Mexican state of Sonora. It stands on the Pacific slope of the Sierra Madre Occidental and close to the course of the River Sonora. The ejido is the municipality's second largest settlement after the municipal seat at Banámichi, reporting a population of 167 in the 2020 INEGI census. It was founded as an ejido by a presidential decree of 30 April 1934 that covered 136 ha to benefit 35 campesinos who had received training in agricultural techniques.
