= Onésimo Mariscales =

Mexican politician

- Born: 16 February 1953 (age 73); Sinaloa, Mexico
- Occupation: Politician
- Political party: PRI

Onésimo Mariscales Delgadillo (born 16 February 1953) is a Mexican politician from the Institutional Revolutionary Party (PRI). From 2009 to 2012 he served in the Chamber of Deputies representing Sonora's 7th district during the 61st Congress.
