= Gustavo Mendívil Amparán =

Mexican politician (born 1960)

- Born: 18 March 1960 (age 66); Sonora, Mexico
- Occupation: Politician
- Political party: Institutional Revolutionary Party

Gustavo Ildefonso Mendívil Amparán (born 18 March 1960) is a Mexican politician from the Institutional Revolutionary Party. From 2006 to 2009, he served as Deputy of the LX Legislature of the Mexican Congress representing Sonora's 7th district.
