= La Estancia, Sonora =

La Estancia
- Location in Mexico
- Coordinates: 29°47′36″N 110°12′40″W
- Country: Mexico
- State: Sonora
- Municipality: Aconchi
- In Aconchi Municipality: since April 13, 1932

Government
  - Mayor: José Jesús Souffle Enríquez (PRI)

Area
  - Total: 0.57 km^{2} (0.22 sq mi)
- Elevation: 603 m (1,978 ft)

Population (2010)
  - Total: 713
  - Density: 1,250.8/km^{2} (3,240/sq mi)
- Time zone: UTC-7 (MST)
- Postal code: 84929
- Area code: +52 623
- INEGI Code: 260010003

La Estancia is a village in Aconchi Municipality located in the center of the Mexican state of Sonora. near the area of the Sierra Madre Occidental, It is the second most populated locality of the municipality counting in 2010 with 713 inhabitants, according to data from INEGI. It is located 2.5 miles from the small city of Aconchi, head of the municipality, and 89 miles from Hermosillo, the state capital. The village was included in the Aconchi Municipality on April 13, 1932, when it was established under Law number 74, and is one of 9 localities that comprise it.
