= Delicias =

Delicias may refer to:

- Delicias Municipality, Mexico
- Delicias, Chihuahua, a city in Mexico
- Delicias, Táchira, a town in Venezuela
- Delicias (Madrid Metro), in Madrid's downtown
- Delicias railway station, in Arganzuela, Madrid, Spain.
- Madrid-Delicias station, now a railway museum.
- Zaragoza–Delicias railway station, in Zaragoza, Aragon, Spain
- Delicias, a district of Upala canton, Alajuela province, Costa Rica.

== See also ==
- Las Delicias (disambiguation)
