= Quiriego Municipality =

Quiriego
- Municipality
- Coat of arms

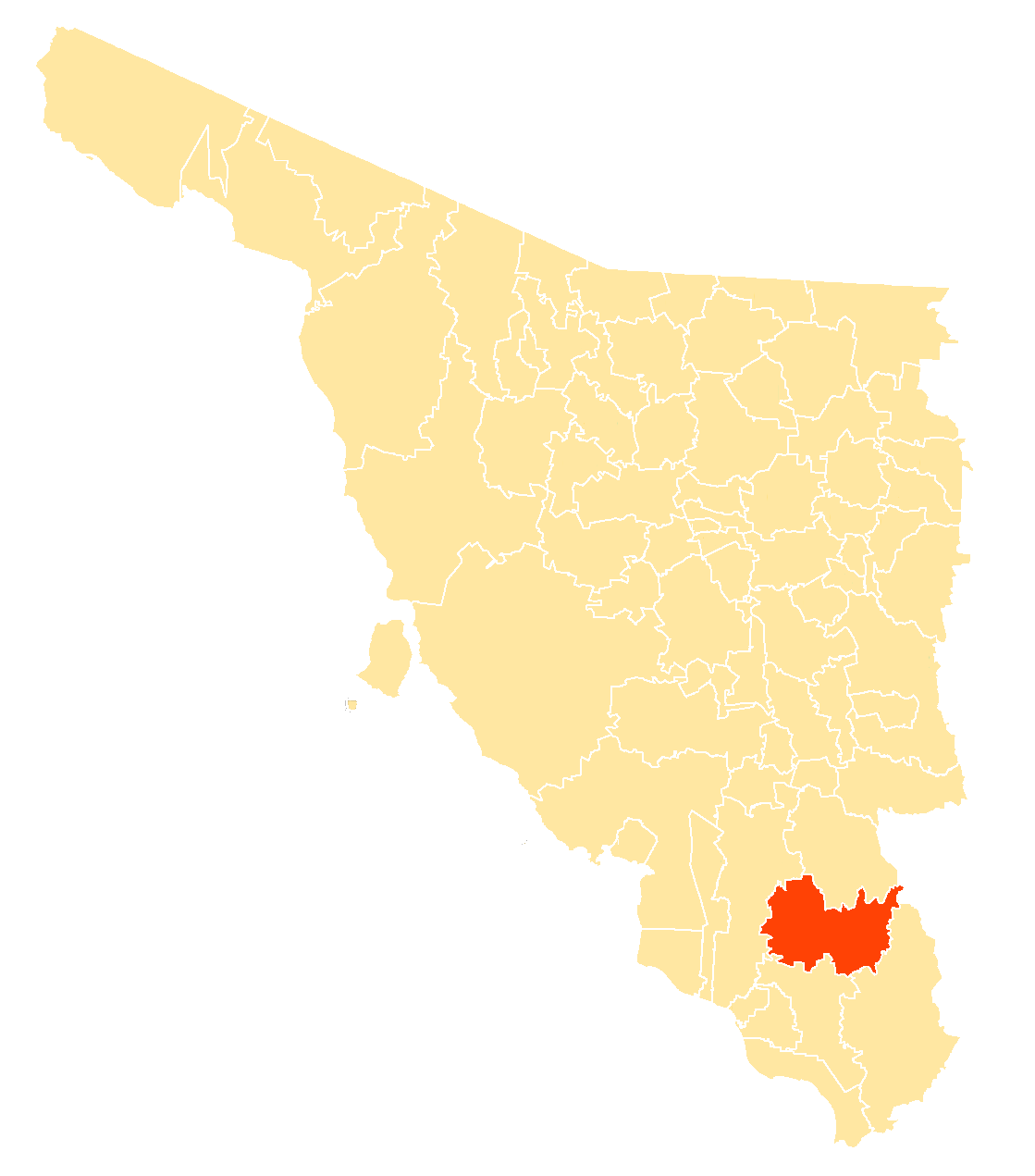
- Location of the municipality in Sonora
- Coordinates: 27°31′N 109°16′W
- Country: Mexico
- State: Sonora
- Municipal seat: Quiriego

Area
  - Total: 2,705.72 km^{2} (1,044.68 sq mi)

Population (2005)
  - Total: 3,335
- Time zone: UTC-7 (Zona Pacífico)

Quiriego is a municipality in the southern part of the Mexican state of Sonora.

== Municipal seat ==
The town of Quiriego is the municipal seat of the municipality. Quiriego is located east of Ciudad Obregón and is connected by dirt road with the main Federal Highway 15 at the village of Fundición.

== Population ==
The municipality's population count was 3,335 in 2005. The municipal population has been decreasing steadily since 1980 when it was 4,474.

There are 121 localities in the municipality of Quiriego, the largest of which are:

| Name | 2020 Census Population |
|---|---|
| Quiriego | 1,299 |
| Batacosa | 423 |
| Cábora | 289 |
| Tepahui | 274 |
| Goijaquía | 125 |
| Bacusa | 115 |
| Los Bajíos (Ejido los Conejos) | 91 |
| El Tanque | 87 |
| El Puerto | 51 |
| El Frijolar | 23 |
| Total Municipality | 3,090 |

== History ==
The name Quiriego comes from the Latin words in the liturgy of the mass "kirie" lord and "ego" I.

Located in this region are the ruins of the ancient Real de Minas y Villa de Baroyeca, which was one of the most important settlements in Sonora during the colonial period and beginning of the post-independence era.

Ruins of the former missions of Batacosa and Tepahui, founded in the eighteenth century, can also be seen.

The municipal seat, Quiriego, was originally a ranch belonging to Francisco Javier Valenzuela in the last years of the eighteenth century. Quiriego became a municipality in 1932.

== Geography ==
The municipality's area is 2,705.72 km². It is within the Sonoran Desert.

Neighboring municipalities

Neighboring municipalities are Rosario to the north, Álamos to the east, Navojoa and the state of Chihuahua to the south, and Cajeme to the west.

=== Climate ===
Climate data for Quiriego
| Month | Jan | Feb | Mar | Apr | May | Jun | Jul | Aug | Sep | Oct | Nov | Dec | Year |
|---|---|---|---|---|---|---|---|---|---|---|---|---|---|
| Mean daily maximum °C (°F) | 25.6 (78.1) | 28 (82) | 29.7 (85.5) | 33.1 (91.6) | 35.3 (95.5) | 39.0 (102.2) | 36.8 (98.2) | 35.3 (95.5) | 35.4 (95.7) | 33.7 (92.7) | 30.2 (86.4) | 26.6 (79.9) | 32.4 (90.3) |
| Mean daily minimum °C (°F) | 7.3 (45.1) | 7.5 (45.5) | 9 (48) | 11.4 (52.5) | 15.1 (59.2) | 20.9 (69.6) | 23.4 (74.1) | 23 (73) | 21.8 (71.2) | 16 (61) | 10.4 (50.7) | 7.0 (44.6) | 14.4 (57.9) |
| Average precipitation mm (inches) | 30 (1.2) | 13 (0.5) | 10 (0.4) | 5.1 (0.2) | 2.5 (0.1) | 20 (0.8) | 190 (7.3) | 180 (7.2) | 99 (3.9) | 43 (1.7) | 15 (0.6) | 33 (1.3) | 640 (25) |
Source: Weatherbase

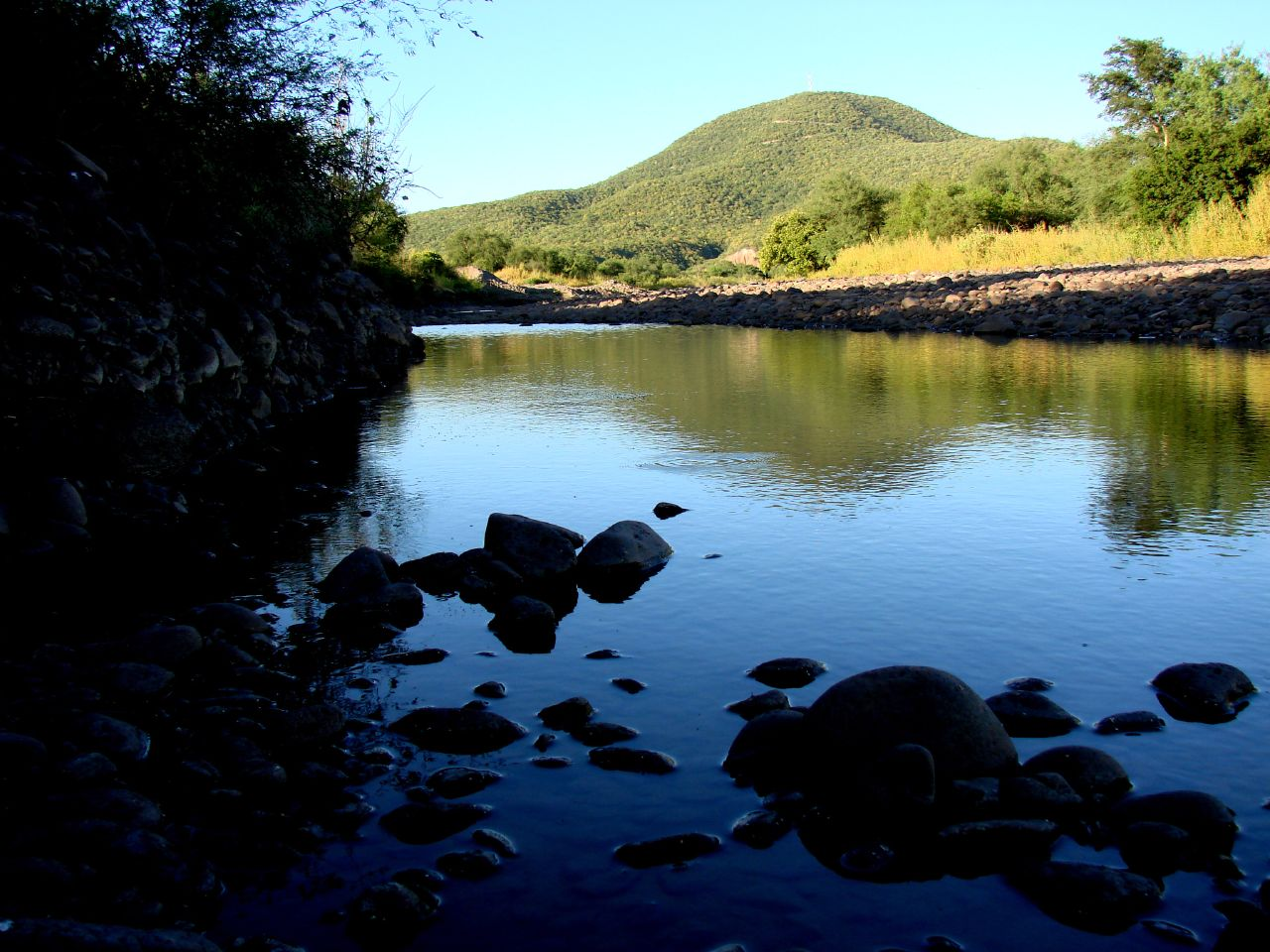
Landscape of the Municipality of Quiriego.

== Economy ==
Agriculture and cattle raising are the main economic activities. Main crops are watermelon, sorghum, corn, beans, and grasses for cattle raising. There were 34,096 head of cattle in 2000. Gobierno de Sonora

== See also ==
- Spanish missions in the Sonoran Desert
- Municipalities of Sonora
