= San Felipe de Jesús, Sonora =

Settlement of Sonora, Mexico

Coordinates: 29°51′35″N 110°14′23″W

San Felipe de Jesús is the municipal seat of San Felipe de Jesús Municipality in the center of the Mexican state of Sonora. It is named after Mexico's first saint and Franciscan martyr, Saint Philip of Jesus.

Most of the inhabitants live in the municipal seat. The population has been decreasing steadily since 1980. At the 2010 census there were 392 inhabitants in the town (locality) out of a 396 total for the municipality. It is the least populous municipality in Mexico outside the State of Oaxaca (where there are 22 less populous).

San Felipe was founded in 1657, when Captain Juan Munguía Villela claimed the lands to establish a ranch for the extraction of minerals.

San Felipe is connected to Huépac and Aconchi by a two lane paved road, which links Mazocahui and Cananea.

The land is hilly with valleys and the main settlement lies at an elevation of 853 meters. The average annual rainfall is 468.8 mm.

The region is crossed by the Sonora River.

Agriculture and cattle raising are the two main economic activities. There were only 154 economically active inhabitants in 2000. Corn and beans are raised for subsistence while grasses are grown for cattle fodder. The cattle herd numbered 3,000 head in 2000.
