= Villa Hidalgo, Sonora =

Villa Hidalgo
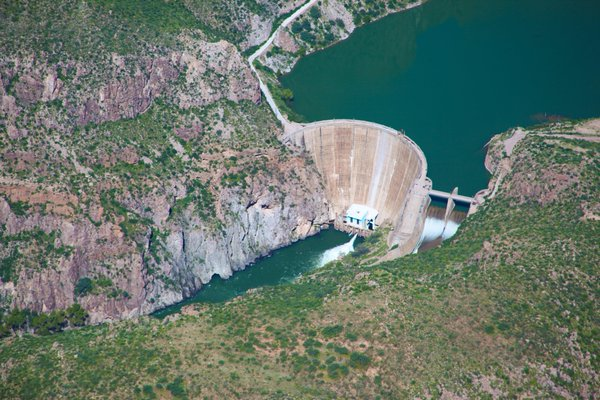
- La Angostura Dam in Villa Hidalgo

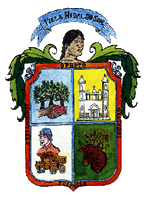
- Coat of arms

- Location within Sonora Location within Mexico
- Coordinates: 30°10′N 109°19′W
- Country: Mexico
- State: Sonora
- Founded: 1644

Government
  - Mayor: Martin Alberto Durazo Durazo
- Time zone: UTC-7 (Zona Pacífico)

Villa Hidalgo is a city, and the surrounding municipality of the same name, in the north-east of the Mexican state of Sonora.

== Municipal seat ==
It was founded by the Jesuit missionary Marcos del Río in 1644 as (San Ignacio de) Oputo. On 1 April 1967 the State Congress ordered that it change its name from Oputo to its current name in honor of Father of the Nation Miguel Hidalgo.

== Area ==
The municipal area is 951.17 km^{2}.

== Population ==
The population was 1,986 inhabitants (2.05 inhab./km^{2}) in 2000.

== Economy ==
The main economic activities are agriculture and cattle raising.
