= People's Health Movement =

International health organizaton

- Founded: 2000; 26 years ago Savar, Bangladesh
- Type: Network/Social movement
- Purpose: Health, Equity, human rights
- Location: Cape Town, South Africa (international)
- Region served: Worldwide
- Method: Direct action, lobbying, research, activism
- Website: www.phmovement.org/cms/

People's Health Movement (PHM) is a global network of grassroots health activists, civil society organizations and academic institutions particularly from developing countries. PHM currently has bases in more than 70 countries that include both individuals and well-established circles with their own governance structures. It has chapters in South Asia (India, Bangladesh, Sri Lanka), Africa (South Africa), Pacific (Australia), South America (Brazil, Ecuador), Central America (El Salvador, Nicaragua, Guatemala), North America (USA, Canada), Europe (Italy, Switzerland, UK, Greece) and several other countries. PHM works towards the revitalisation of Primary Health Care (PHC), as described in the Alma-Ata Declaration of 1978.

Vision of PHM:

"Equity, ecologically-sustainable development and peace are at the heart of our vision of a better world - a world in which a healthy life for all is a reality; a world that respects, appreciates and celebrates all life and diversity; a world that enables the flowering of people's talents and abilities to enrich each other; a world in which people's voices guide the decisions that shape our lives...."

== History ==
At the Alma-Ata Conference in 1978, health ministers from 134 countries, in association with the World Health Organization (WHO) and UNICEF, set a goal of achieving "Health for All by the Year 2000" and identified primary health care as the mean to achieve it. However, in response to continued and deepened health inequalities, on 8 December 2000, 1453 delegates from 92 countries met at Savar, Bangladesh for the First People's Health Assembly which led to the founding of the People's Health Movement and the drafting of the People's Charter for Health

== People's Charter for Health ==
The People's Charter for Health echos many of the principles of the Alma Ata Declaration by recognizing health as "..a social, economic and political issue and above all a fundamental human right". It names "inequality, poverty, exploitation, violence and injustice" as the main drivers of ill-health and calls for "Health for ALL NOW" through the involvement of people's organizations in health decision making. PHM attributes the inequity in health care to the laissez faire economic practices globally and seeks to counter these practices and challenge health policy makers around the world with a Peoples Health Campaign for Health for All-Now!

== Social Determinants of Health ==
See Also: Social determinants of health and Social determinants of health in poverty

PHM also works to address the Social determinants of health, including in particular, the growing inequity within and between nations attributed by them to unfair economic structures which lock people into poverty and poor health. PHM helped to put the Social Determinants of Health on the global agenda through continued engagement with the World Health Organization. In response Prof. Fran Baum (Australia), at that time Chair of the PHM Steering Council, was appointed as a commissioner on the WHO Commission on Social Determinants of Health (CSDH). Working with other civil society organizations, PHM helped gather evidence for the WHO final report on the Social Determinants of health released in August 2008. PHM's engagement with the commission's work also resulted in the publication of a Civil Society Report on Social Determinants of Health. In 2011 PHM was involved in the civil society side meeting during the Conference on Social Determinants of Health, taking place in Rio de Janeiro.

== Campaign on Right to Health ==
The PHM is engaged in a major global campaign to promote the Right to Health which involves coordinated national and international level action. PHM uses a consultative process in countries to involve thousands of people in making a demand for Health for All as described in the Alma Ata Declaration of 1978.

The first phase of the campaign involves the production of rights-based evaluations of national health policies in countries with PHM circles. The global coordinating group has developed The Assessment of the Right to Health at the Country Level: A People's Health Movement Guide for national PHM circles to use to produce consistent reports using human rights law. The second phase of the campaign focuses on movement building and mobilisation.

== Global Health Watch ==
The Peoples Health Movement plays a lead role in co-ordinating the production of the Global Health Watch.

The Global Health Watch is an endeavour to propose to the global community an alternate vision of health that is located in a vision of equity, rights and empowerment. It is a collaborative exercise, initiated by the Peoples Health Movement (PHM), Global Equity Gauge Alliance (GEGA) and Medact in 2004. An important outcome of the process is the periodic publication of a document termed the Global Health Watch – a document that is contributed to by researchers, academics and activists from across the globe. Two editions of the document have been published, the first in 2005 as Global Health Watch I and the second in 2008 as Global Health Watch II. The third edition of the GHW is to be published in 2011. The Global Health Watch aims to:

- Promote human rights as the basis for health policy
- Counterbalance liberal and market-driven perspectives
- Shift the health policy agenda to recognise the political, social and economic barriers to better health
- Improve civil society's capacity to hold national and international governments, global international financial institutions and corporations to account (including WHO and the World Bank)
- Strengthen the links between civil society organisations around the world
- Provide a forum for magnifying the voice of the poor and vulnerable

The document is divided into the following broad sections:

1. An analysis of the global political and economic architecture, within which are located the decisions and choices that impact on health.

2. A view of current issues and debates on health systems across the world, from which it is possible to draw appropriate lessons and propose concrete actions for promoting health.

3. Beyond Health Care – a discussion of different determinants of health

4. The Watching Section – dedicated to the scrutiny of global processes and institutions that are crucially important for health and health care in the globe.

5. A section proposing alternatives and highlighting stories of success and resistance that are exemplars of actual actions that have contributed to better health and health care.

Thus, unlike other reports on global health, the Global Health Watch also draws attention to the politics of global health and the policies and actions of key actors. The document is also a call to all health workers to broaden and strengthen the global community of health advocates who are taking action on global ill-health and inequalities, and their underlying political and economic determinants. Not only is it an educational resource for health professionals and activists, it makes clear the need for global health advocates to engage in lobbying many key actors to do better and to do more, whilst resisting those that do harm. It also seeks to act as a catalyst for the development and strengthening of existing campaigns around the world to improve health and equity. The document published as the Global Health Watch is, thus, a culmination of a global process. Typically, each Watch is contributed to directly by over 200 people from across the globe. While the published document is an important product, it is by no means the only outcome to be desired from the entire process. The process of producing the Watch involves the animation of a large number of different processes, in different regions and countries. The process promotes the scrutiny of national and regional policies related to health. It also promotes debate among health academics and activists on key issues that are critical for the promotion of global health.

The Watch itself has different uses and target audiences. It is a lobbying tool for health movements to work on policy makers in countries and global institutions. It is also a resource book for academics and health activists. It is a tool to mobilise civil society on issues of major concern. Thus the Global Health Watch goes much beyond the production of one document. Further, the launch of the GHW in different parts of the world is an opportunity to mobilise around issues that impact on access to health and health care.

While the PHM is responsible for the Secretariat of the Global Health Watch, its co-ordinating group also includes Medact (based in the UK), Health Action International, Medicos (Germany) and Third World Network.

== International People’s Health University – IPHU ==
The International People's Health University is a short training course for young health activists focussing on the politics of health. The IPHU has organized 20 short courses entitled ‘The Struggle for Health’ of 2-week duration each. The courses have been organized in over 15 countries so far, in 9 languages and attended by about 1000 health activists from more than 60 countries.

== thematic campaigns ==
PHM activists organise following thematic groups in addition to their local or regional activities based on local needs and issues:

Extractive Industries

Access to Affordable quality health care and medicines

Food sovereignty

Anti privatisation of Health care

Gender and reproductive justice

Trade and health

PHM advocates that Health should not be viewed as a commodity that is traded in the market. The PHM supports the call for taking health related subjects out of the global trade negotiations and from the World Trade Organisation (WTO) and other regional and bilateral trade agreements. The PHM views the agreement on Trade Related Intellectual Property Rights(TRIPS) as iniquitous and against the interest of developing countries and poor patients. It supports legislation in India and other countries which allows generic drug companies to manufacture medications still covered by patents in other countries.
