= La Estancia, El Salvador =

Town in El Salvador

Coordinates: 13.710°N 89.209°W

La Estancia is a small caserío (hamlet) in El Salvador. It is located in the Texistepeque district of the municipality of Santa Ana Norte, in the departamento of Santa Ana.

It is located 85.7 km (53.3 mi) from El Salvador's capital San Salvador.
