= Banámichi Municipality =

Coordinates: 30.0094°N 110.2134°W

Banámichi
- Municipality
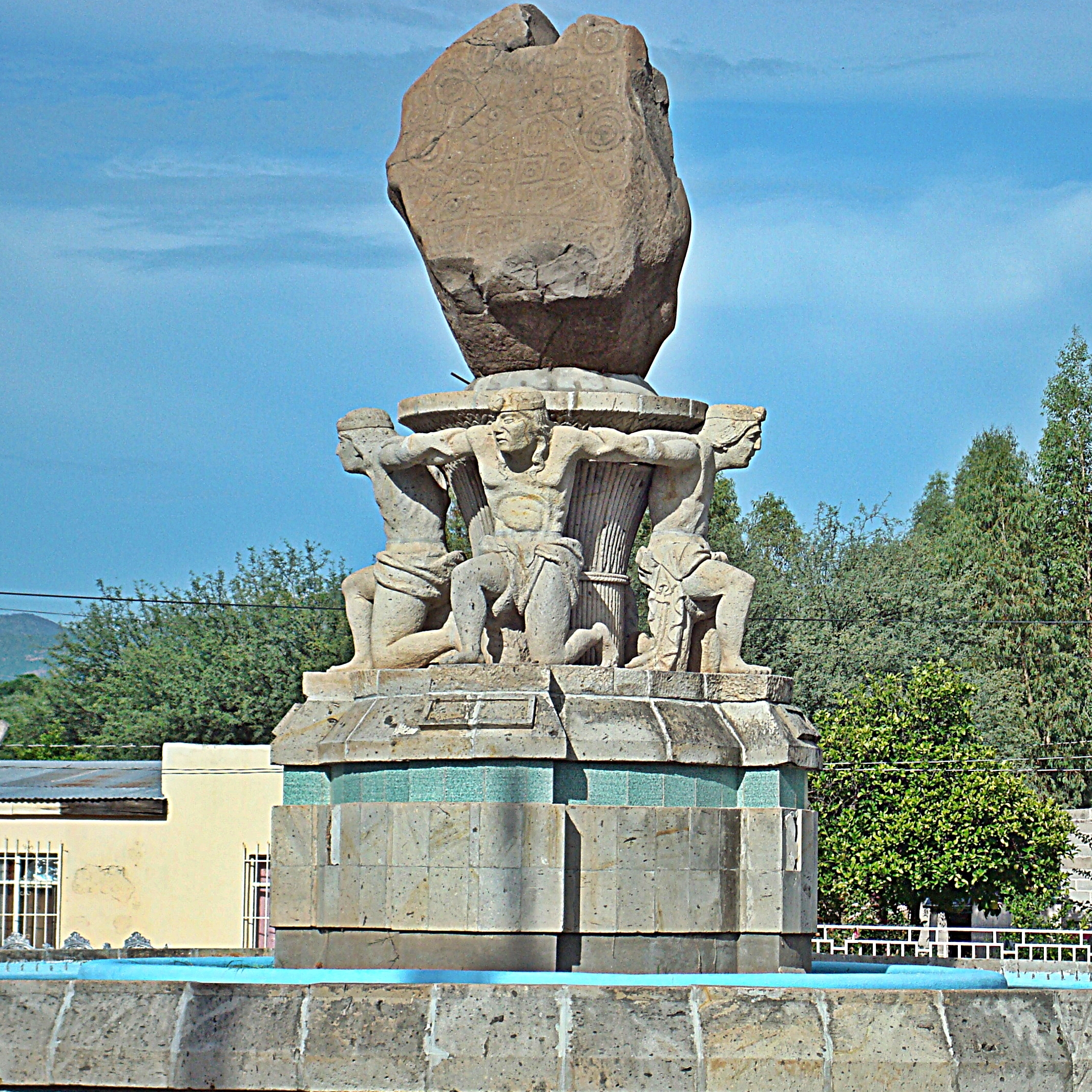
- Piedra Histórica Monument in 2019

- Coat of arms
- Interactive map of Banámichi
- Country: Mexico
- State: Sonora
- Municipal seat: Banámichi

Population (2020)
  - Total: 1,825
- Time zone: UTC-7 (Zona Pacífico)
- Website: banamichi.gob.mx

Banámichi is a municipality in the state of Sonora in northwestern Mexico. The municipal seat is at Banámichi.
