= Rayón, Sonora =

Coordinates: 29.717°N 110.583°W

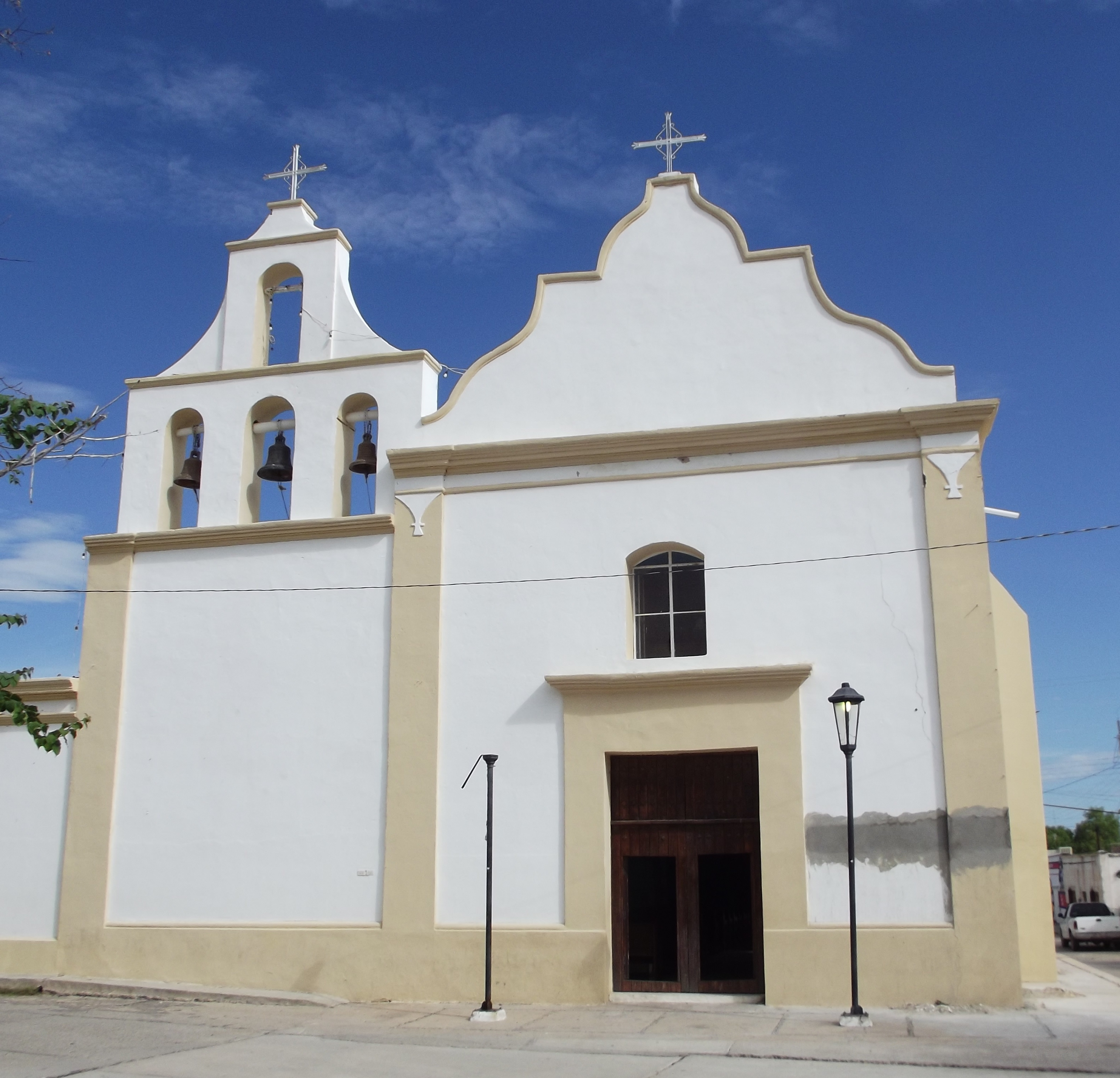

Rayón is a small town surrounded by its municipal area in the center of the Mexican state of Sonora at a distance of 110 kilometers from the state capital Hermosillo.

== Area and population ==
The population of the municipal seat was 1,273 in 2000. It is located at an elevation of 618 meters.

== Climate ==
Climate data for Rayón, Sonora (1991–2020 normals, extremes 1974–present)
Month	Jan	Feb	Mar	Apr	May	Jun	Jul	Aug	Sep	Oct	Nov	Dec	Year
Record high °C (°F)	35 (95)	37 (99)	39 (102)	42 (108)	44 (111)	47 (117)	47 (117)	46 (115)	48 (118)	41.5 (106.7)	42 (108)	39 (102)	48 (118)
Mean daily maximum °C (°F)	23.7 (74.7)	24.6 (76.3)	27.8 (82.0)	30.7 (87.3)	34.6 (94.3)	38.8 (101.8)	37.3 (99.1)	36.3 (97.3)	35.1 (95.2)	32.5 (90.5)	27.7 (81.9)	23.0 (73.4)	31.0 (87.8)
Daily mean °C (°F)	13.9 (57.0)	14.8 (58.6)	17.2 (63.0)	19.5 (67.1)	23.3 (73.9)	28.4 (83.1)	29.7 (85.5)	29.0 (84.2)	27.3 (81.1)	22.8 (73.0)	17.7 (63.9)	13.5 (56.3)	21.4 (70.5)
Mean daily minimum °C (°F)	4.1 (39.4)	4.9 (40.8)	6.7 (44.1)	8.3 (46.9)	11.9 (53.4)	17.9 (64.2)	22.2 (72.0)	21.7 (71.1)	19.5 (67.1)	13.1 (55.6)	7.7 (45.9)	4.0 (39.2)	11.8 (53.2)
Record low °C (°F)	−5 (23)	−6 (21)	−1 (30)	1 (34)	3 (37)	5 (41)	12.5 (54.5)	12.5 (54.5)	7 (45)	1 (34)	−4 (25)	−4 (25)	−6 (21)
Average precipitation mm (inches)	21.9 (0.86)	23.2 (0.91)	13.5 (0.53)	4.2 (0.17)	0.7 (0.03)	23.5 (0.93)	144.1 (5.67)	135.7 (5.34)	82.5 (3.25)	27.1 (1.07)	27.7 (1.09)	25.2 (0.99)	529.3 (20.84)
Average rainy days	2.1	2.4	1.7	0.5	0.2	1.8	10.3	10.1	5.2	1.9	1.6	2.7	40.5
Source: Servicio Meteorológico Nacional

== Transport ==
There are highway connections with Ures (41 kilometers), Carbó (48 kilometers), and Opodepe (26 kilometers).

== History ==
Rayón was founded in 1638, by the Jesuit missionary Pedro Pantoja, who gave it the name of Nuestra Señora del Rosario de Nacameri; the area had been inhabited by the Pima Bajos. In 1825 the name was changed to Rayón to honor General Ignacio López Rayón. In 1850 it was given the category of villa and in the middle of the nineteenth century it was a municipality belonging to the district of Ures. An important date is the beginning of the construction of the church which still is in use today.

== Health and education ==
There were 7 schools and one doctor in 2000. Gobierno de Sonora

== Economy ==
The main economic activity is cattle raising. In 2000 the census counted over 18,000 head of cattle.
