= Cumpas =

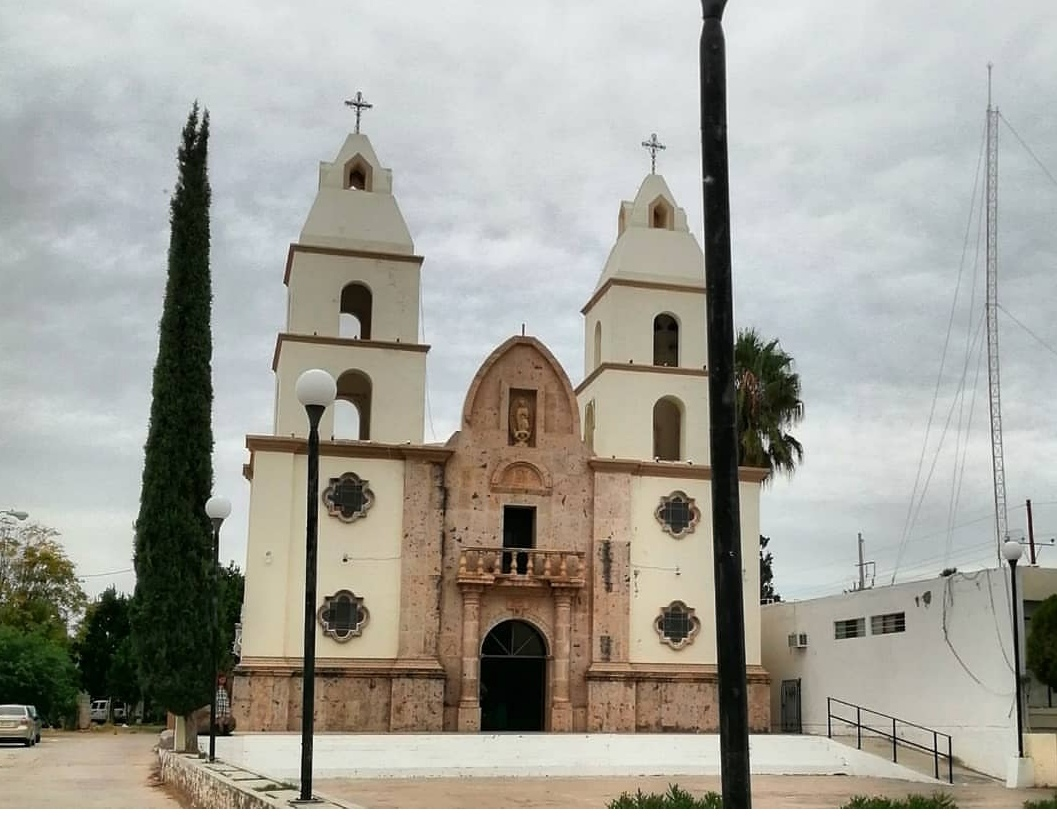
Parroquia de Nuestra Señora de Guadalupe, local church

Cumpas is the municipal seat of Cumpas Municipality of the Mexican state of Sonora.

== Notable people ==
- Gabito Ballesteros (born 1999), singer-songwriter
- Arturo Durazo Moreno (1924–2000), former Chief of Police of Mexico City convicted of corruption and extortion
