= San Miguel de Horcasitas =

Coordinates: 29°29′N 110°45′W

- Interactive map of San Miguel de Horcasitas
- Country: Mexico
- State: Sonora
- Municipality: San Miguel de Horcasitas
- Founded: 1749
- Time zone: UTC-7 (Pacific (US Mountain))

San Miguel de Horcasitas is a town in San Miguel de Horcasitas Municipality, in the Mexican state of Sonora. San Miguel is located in the center of the state at an elevation of 518 meters.

The town was founded as a Spanish presidio, and named for the viceroy of New Spain, Juan Francisco de Güemes. From 1749 to 1777, it was the provincial capital of Sonora.

In 1814 it became a town (ayuntamiento), one of the first in the state.

The economy is based on cattle raising and subsistence agriculture.
