= Rosario de Tesopaco =

- City and municipality
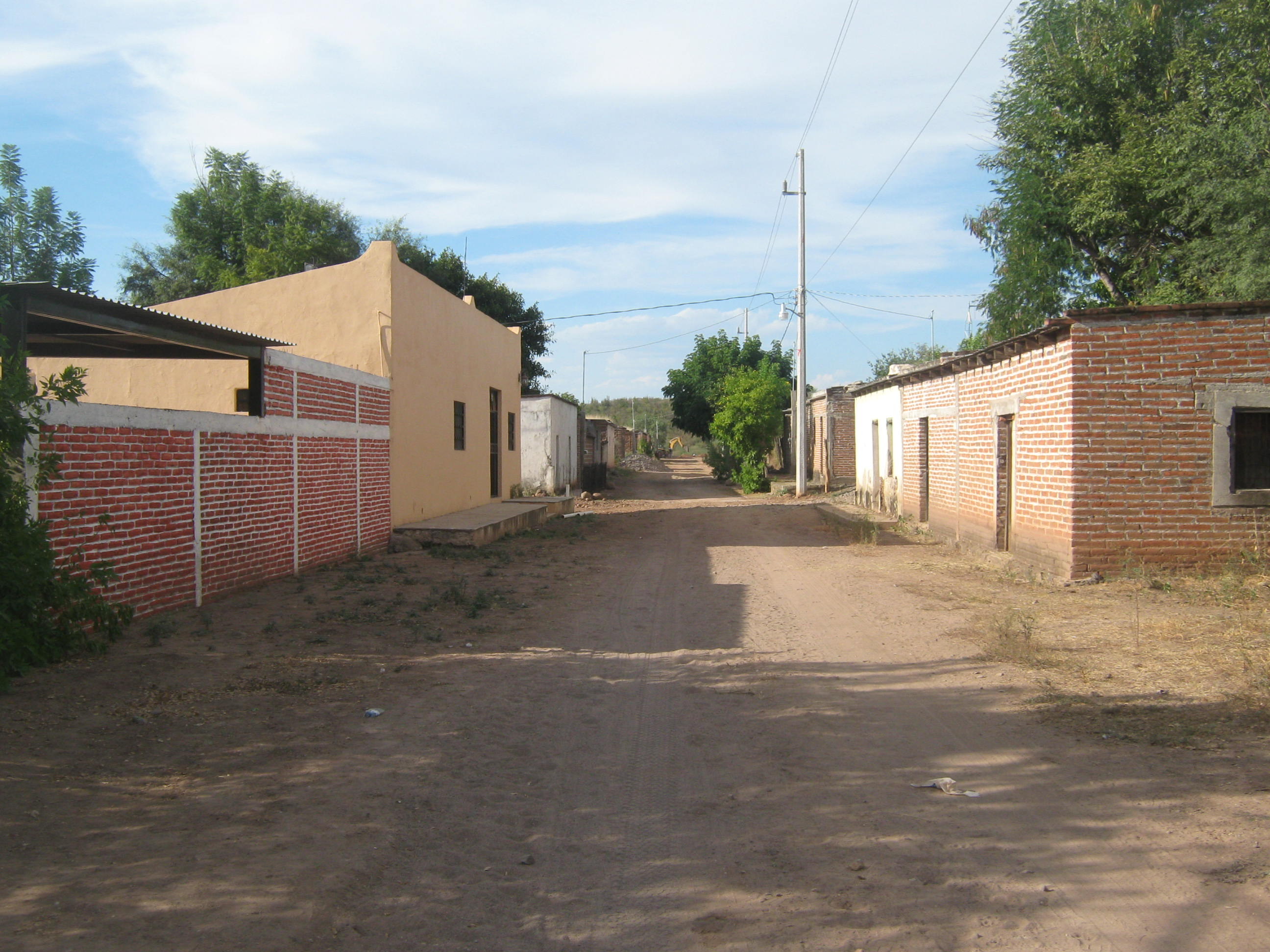
- Interactive map of Rosario de Tesopaco
- Coordinates: 27.841°N 109.368°W
- Country: Mexico
- State: Sonora
- Municipality: Rosario de Tesopaco

Population (2020)
  - Total: 2,927
- Time zone: UTC-7 (Pacific (US Mountain))

Rosario de Tesopaco (often abbreviated to Rosario) is a small town, the seat of Rosario de Tesopaco Municipality in the southeast of the Mexican state of Sonora.

== History ==
The municipal seat was originally a cattle ranch called San Salvador Tesopaco. In 1622 the Jesuit missionary Diego Vandersipe founded the settlements of Santa Ana de Movas and San Joaquín de Nuri, which were seats of their respective municipalities belonging to the larger municipality of Rosario. In 1866 in the village of Movas there was a skirmish between the liberal troops of Coronel Asunción Correa and an Imperialist group commanded by Joaquín Monge; the liberals won. In 1879 it acquired the category of municipality and annexed the former municipalities of Movas and Nuri.

The population of Rosario de Tesocapo is 5,432 as of 2000.

== Health and education ==
There were 23 schools and a small health clinic in 2000. A central gathering place for the community is the town square, a beautifully built area with stone floors and tall pillars. This space is used for community gatherings where music flows through the space and individuals bring their own cooking and baking.

== Economy ==
The main economic activity is cattle raising. In 2000 the census counted over 35,000 head of cattle. A second major economic driver is mining which has brought financial improvements to the community. The community boasts small local businesses including shoemaker, clothing maker as well as small local markets.
