= Opodepe =

Town in Opodepe Municipality, Sonora, Mexico

- Town and Municipality
- Seal

- Location in Sonora
- Coordinates: 29°55′N 110°37′W
- Country: Mexico
- State: Sonora
- Municipality: Opodepe
- Time zone: UTC–07:00 (Zona Pacífico)

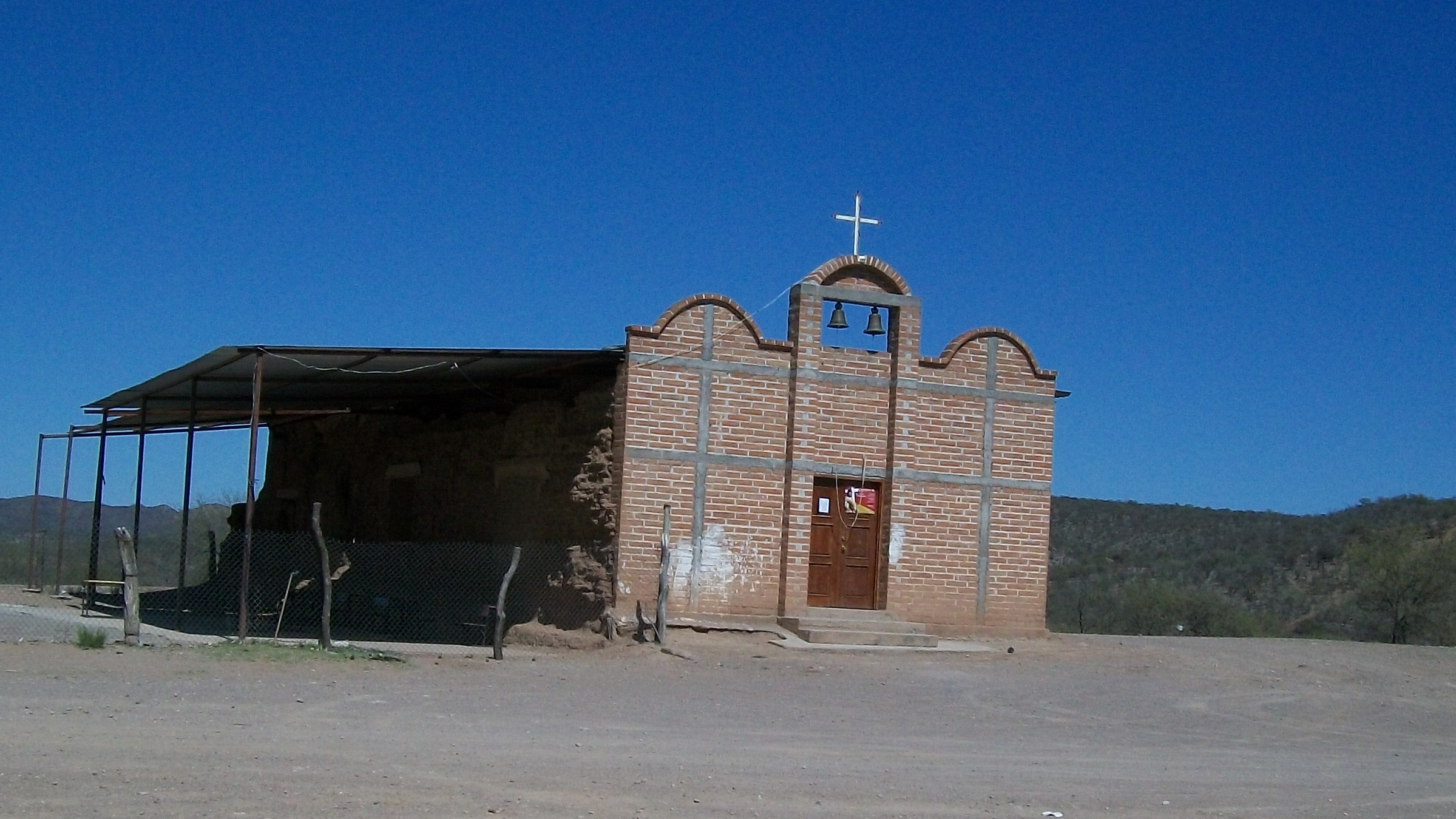
Iglesia de Tuape

Opodepe is the municipal seat of Opodepe Municipality in the north of the Mexican state of Sonora.

The main settlement and the municipal seat had a population of 346 in 2000.

The municipal seat of Opodepe is connected to Mex 15 by a road that was gravel in 2005.

The settlement of Querobabi, located near Federal Highway 15 (four-lane toll), has seen an increase in population from 900 in 1980 to 3,900 in 2005 while the municipal seat, located in the hill lands has seen a decrease from over 1,000 to its present population of less than 500. The land now occupied by Opodepe was once the land of the Opata Indians. The name of Opodepe comes from the Opata language, from the roots "opo", which means iron wood, "det" flat, and "pa" place, "in the plain of the ironwood".

In 1704, Father Kino founded the mission settlement of Nuestra Señora de la Asunción de Opodepe in this town.

The settlement of Tuape is another location of 75 inhabitants from this municipality, with Misión San Miguel Tuape.

== Geography and climate ==
The land is divided between hills and flatland and the main settlement lies at an elevation of 596 meters. The average annual rainfall is 424.0 mm.

== Economy ==
The economically active population was 978 inhabitants in 2000. Agriculture and cattle raising are the two main economic activities. Agriculture is used as a support for the cattle industry, with the cultivation of rye grass, barley, sorghum, and alfalfa.

Industrial activity is limited to the production of the nationally famous Querobabi bricks, roof tiles, and floor tiles, which are mostly exported to the United States of America.

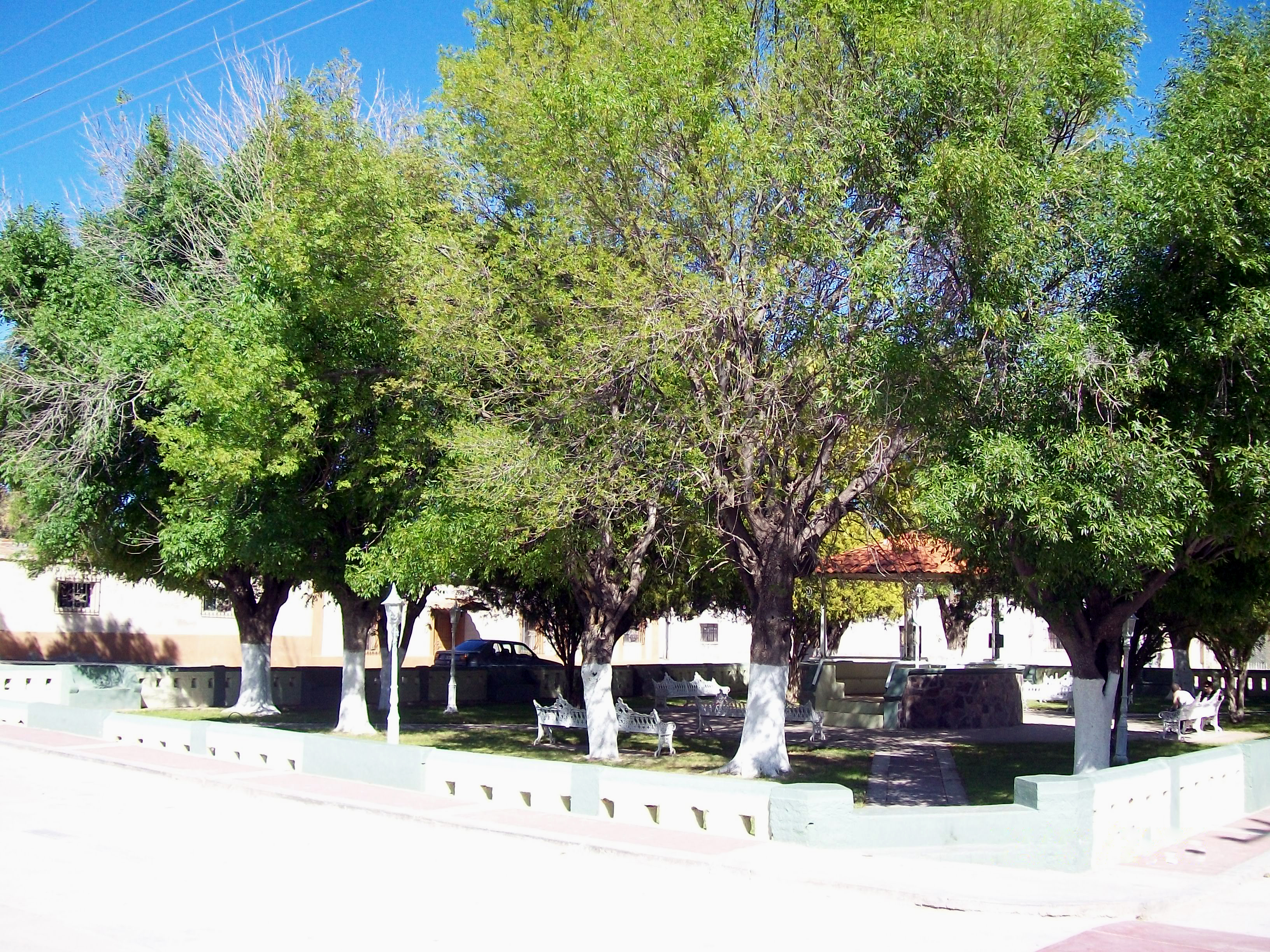
Plaza de Opodepe
