= Huépac =

Coordinates: 29°54′N 110°12′W

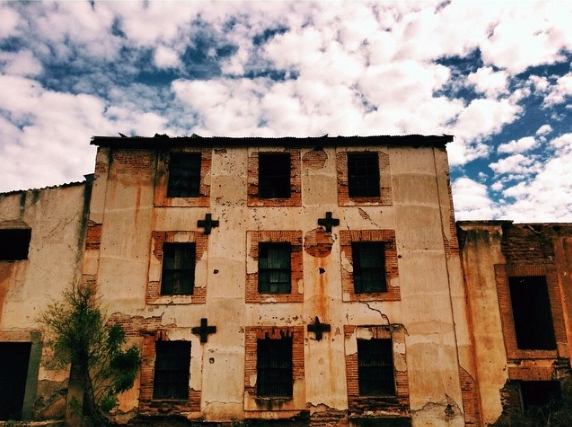
Ruins in Huépac

Huepac is the seat of a Huépac Municipality in the center of the Mexican state of Sonora. The municipal area is 317.37 km^{2} with a population of 1,142 registered in 2000.

Most of the inhabitants live in the municipal seat.

Huépac was founded in 1644 by the Jesuit missionary Gerónimo de la Canal with the name of San Lorenzo de Güepaca. Its name comes from the Ópata Indian word, Güepaca, which means big valley; from Güe big and paca, valley in Ópata.

The land is hilly with valleys and the main settlement lies at an elevation of 304 meters. The average annual temperature is 21.4 °C and the average annual rainfall is 424.0 mm.

The region is crossed by the Rio Sonora, which receives the waters of the El Gavilán, Güevarachi and Triunfo.

Agriculture and cattle raising are the two main economic activities. Corn and beans are raised for subsistence while grasses are grown for cattle fodder. The cattle herd numbered 15,000 head in 2000. The economically active population in 2000 was only 340 workers.
