= Banámichi =

Banámichi Bacoachi or vanamitzi
- Town
- Location within Sonora Location within Mexico
- Coordinates: 30°00′34″N 110°12′48″W
- Country: Mexico
- State: Sonora
- Municipality: Banámichi

Population (2020)
  - Total: 1,417
- Time zone: UTC-7 (Zona Pacífico)

Banámichi (Opata: Banamitzi) is a small town in north-central Sonora, Mexico. It serves as the seat for the surrounding municipality of the same name. Geographical coordinates are 30°01′N 110°13′W.

== Area and population ==
The municipal area is 773.06 km² and the population was 1,417 in 2020, comprising 77% of the municipality's population. Two other smaller pueblos are part of the municipality: La Mora and Las Delicias.) There were 1.96 inhabitants per square kilometer in the municipality, which has been losing population since the census of 1995. The lack of economic opportunity has caused many people to emigrate, especially to the United States. There is anecdotal evidence that this emigration was reversed with many former residents returning to the area due to the 2008 financial crisis.

== Geography ==
Banámichi is approximately 135 miles (217 km) south of Bisbee, Arizona, U.S., by road. The town lies on the east side of the Sonora River which defines the region. Much of the land above the river is mountainous and soils are poor. Land along the river bottom is generally more productive, producing alfalfa, fruit trees and small cash crops. There are still pine and oak trees in higher elevations, and some logging is carried out. The area still has wildlife such as mule deer, big horn sheep, white tailed deer, bobcats, opossums, mourning dove, wild turkey, and quail. Mountain lion and Jaguar sightings have been reported in the higher elevations.

== Education and health care ==
Banámichi has the only middle-level school in the region, serving an area from the localities of Mazocahui to Arizpe. There is no hospital and the population is served by a public health clinic.

== Communications ==
A state highway (Son 089) links the municipality with the state capital, Hermosillo to the south and the cities of Arizpe and Cananea to the north. There is an undeveloped air strip for small planes. Telecommunication services available are Telmex voice services, high speed ADSL internet and Telcel cellular services.

== Economic activity ==
The main economic activities are agriculture and cattle raising with limited tourist activity. More than half the population works in these areas. Subsistence farming is carried out to produce corn and beans while most of the farming is of grasses for cattle feed. The cattle herd had over 10,000 head in 2000.

Industry is limited to a handful of micro industries and a modest plant assembling fish hooks for the North American market. The long abandoned Santa Elena gold and silver mine has been reopened, and employs upwards of 300 employees and contractors.

A small cottage industry making furniture of mesquite wood has developed with two carpentry shops producing rustic chairs, tables, beds, and other pieces.

== Tourist attractions ==
The recently rebuilt Plaza Hidalgo is very attractive with a gazebo/bandstand in the center. Facing the plaza is the main church, Iglesia de Nuestra Señora de Loreto, which was begun in the 17th century and retains its original structure with additions from the 1940s. The Palacio Municipal, or city hall, also faces the plaza. The city park on the main highway contains the Piedra Histórica, an ancient petroglyph, being held aloft by statues of four imposing Opata warriors. Scholars believe the petroglyph represents an irrigation map. Just south of the town is the Bacachi warm springs pools. The town has a baseball stadium where the home team, the Halcones, play in the municipal league and games are often televised. Quarter horse racing takes place at a track near the airport.

La Posada del Río Sonora is an historic inn with a full restaurant, cafe, and cantina, located on Plaza Hidalgo. The main part of the hotel is remodeled from a 17th-century colonial adobe house. La Posada has a large rooftop terrace that is considered the best sunset view in town. Other hotels in Banámichi are Hotel Los Arcos de Sonora, opened in 2009, a combination of a hundred-year-old restored adobe and modern construction. Los Arcos features a restaurant and is unique in that it is the only hotel in the area with a swimming pool, Los Dos Potrillos, and two smaller guest houses, Guest House Guely and Casa Rural León. Also, several of the cattle ranches in the area also serve as hunting lodges for organized hunting trips, typically run by professional hunting outfitters.

== Origin of the name and history ==
The name is derived from the Opata word Banamitzi, which means, "Where the water turns" or "lowered by water". The region was once inhabited by the Opata people; in 1639 the Spanish missionary Bartolomé Castaños S.J. founded the settlement of Nuestra Señora de los Remedios de Banámichi. In 1930 it became part of the municipality of Arizpe and got its autonomy in 1931, with Banámichi as its municipal seat.
