= Aconchi =

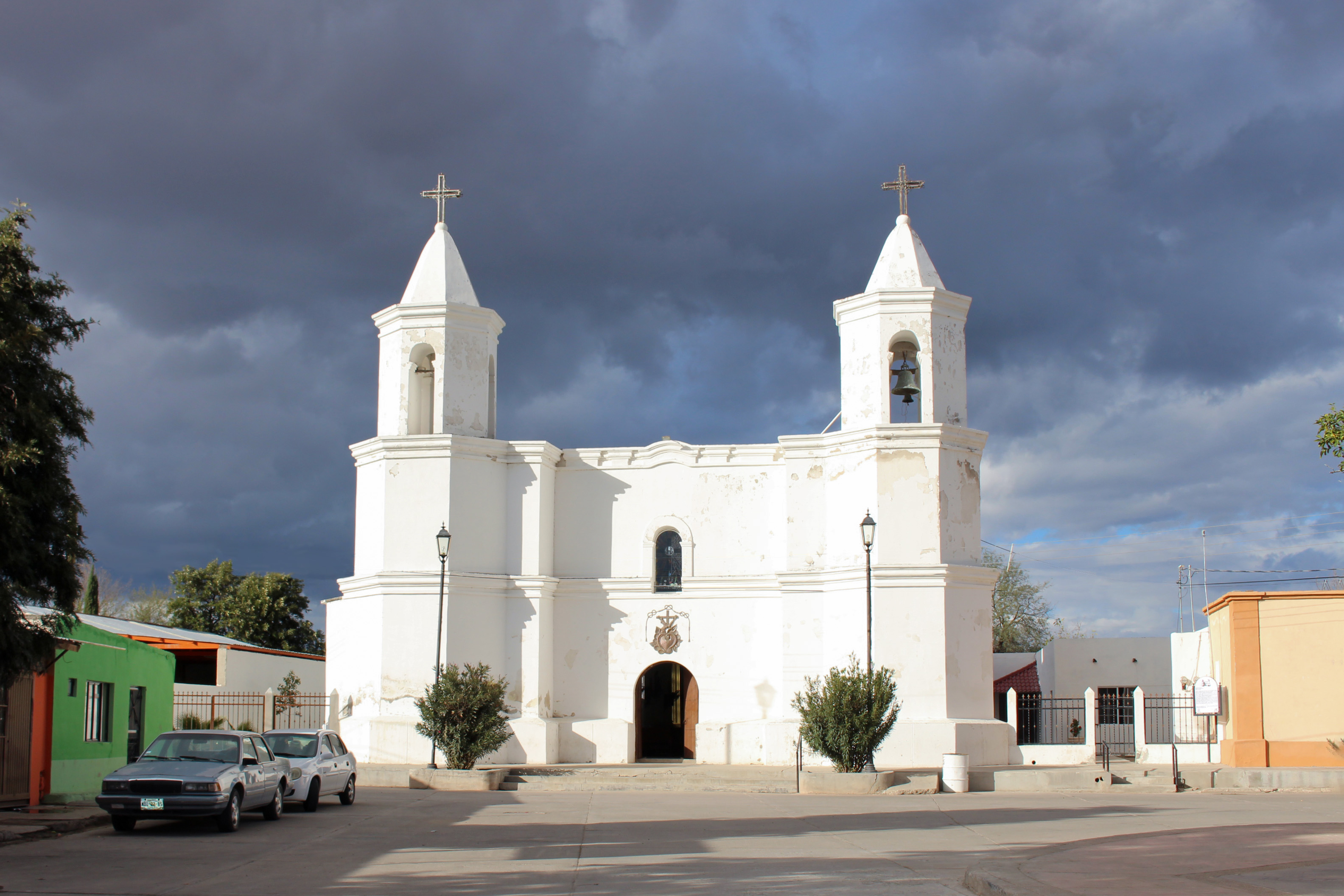
- San Pedro Temple

- Seal

- Location in Mexico
- Coordinates: 29°49′N 110°13′W
- Country: Mexico
- State: Sonora
- Municipality: Aconchi
- Founded: 1639 (by Barmotolmé Castaño)
- Municipality: 1932

Government
  - Mayor: José Jesús Souffle Enríquez (PRI)

Area
  - Total: 1.05 km^{2} (0.41 sq mi)
- Elevation: 612 m (2,008 ft)

Population (2020)
  - Total: 1,650
  - Density: 1,187.05/km^{2} (3,074.4/sq mi)
- Time zone: UTC-7 (Pacific (US Mountain))
- Postal code: 84920
- Area code: +52 623

Aconchi is a small city in Aconchi Municipality that surrounds it, located in the center of the Mexican state of Sonora. The population of the municipality (urban and rural) was 2,452 in 2005 in an area of 358.74 square kilometers. It became a municipality in 1932.

The mission San Pedro Aconchi was founded in 1639 by the Jesuit missionaries Bartolomé Castaños and Pedro Pantoja.

The municipal seat lies at an elevation of 609 meters above sea level.

The land is mainly mountainous making agriculture difficult; therefore the economy is dependent on cattle raising. The Sonora River crosses the municipality from north to south, but its water flow is irregular.

Aconchi lies on the main highway linking state capital Hermosillo with Cananea.

There is a modest spa called Aguas Termales de Aconchi, located a few kilometers to the north, which has tourist potential. The main tourist attraction is “El Agua Caliente de Aconchi”, which consists of a spring of medicinal waters reaching a temperature of 59 °C (138.2 °F). It is located 4 km from the town on the highway that goes from Hermosillo to Arizpe.

This recreational spot has no hotel infrastructure but there is an area for camping. Besides the swimming pool there is a restaurant and an area for barbecues.

== Resources ==
- Map
- Gobierno de Sonora
