= List of gold mines =

The following are lists of gold mines and are subsidiary to the list of mines article and lists working, defunct and planned mines that have substantial gold output, organized by country.

== North America ==
- List of gold mines in Canada
- List of gold mines in the United States

=== Mexico ===
- El Chanate
- Mulatos gold mine

=== Caribbean ===
- Haiti
  - Mont Organisé gold mine
- Dominican Republic
  - Pueblo Viejo mine, Pueblo Viejo, Azua

== Africa ==
- Democratic Republic of Congo
  - Kibali Gold Mine
  - Namoya Gold Mine
  - Twangiza Gold Mine
- Egypt
  - Alsukari
- List of gold mines in Tanzania
- Ghana
  - Goldfields Tarkwa mine
  - Goldfields Damang mine
  - Anglogold Ashanti Iduaprem mine
  - Kinross Chirano Gold mine
  - Gold Star Wassa Mine
  - Mensin Gold Bibiani Mine
  - Perseus Edikan Gold Mine
  - Anglogold Ashanti Obuasi Gold Mine
  - Newmont Ahafo Gold Mine
  - Newmont Akyem Gold Mine
  - Asanko Gold Mine
  - Rabotec Ghana
- South Africa
  - Beatrix
  - Erfdeel-Dankbaarheid
  - Free State Geduld
  - Jeanette
  - Loraine
  - Oryx
  - President Brand
  - President Steyn
  - St. Helena
  - Welkom
  - Western Holdings

== Oceania ==
- List of gold mines in Australia

Papua New Guinea

- Panguna

== South America ==
=== Argentina ===
- Cerro Negro mine
- Cerro Vanguardia mine
- Filo del Sol mine (planned)
- Gualcamayo mine
- Veladero mine

=== Chile ===
Location of the five mines that produces most gold in Chile. Only El Peñón and La Coipa have gold as its main product, other the three other mines produce gold as by-product of copper mining.
- Cerro Casale mine
- El Alto mine (planned)
- El Peñón mine
- El Toqui mine
- Filo del Sol mine (planned)
- La Coipa mine
- Lobo-Marte mine (planned)
- Tambo de Oro mine

=== Peru ===
- Rio Huaypetue mine

== Europe ==
=== Finland ===
- Lapland
  - Ahmavaara mine
  - Kittilä mine

=== United Kingdom ===
==== Scotland ====
- Beinn Chùirn
- Lowther Hills

=== Switzerland ===
- Gondo Gold Mine

== Asia ==
=== India ===
- List of gold mines in India

=== Iran ===
- Bijvard
- Ghaleh Zari
- Mazrae Shadi
- Taftan
- Zareh Shuran
- Zarkuh

=== Japan ===
- List of gold mines in Japan

=== Mongolia ===
- List of gold mines in Mongolia

== See also ==
- List of countries by gold production
- List of largest gold mines by production
