= Young-Davidson mine =

Gold mine in Ontario, Canada

Coordinates: 47.948°N 80.685°W

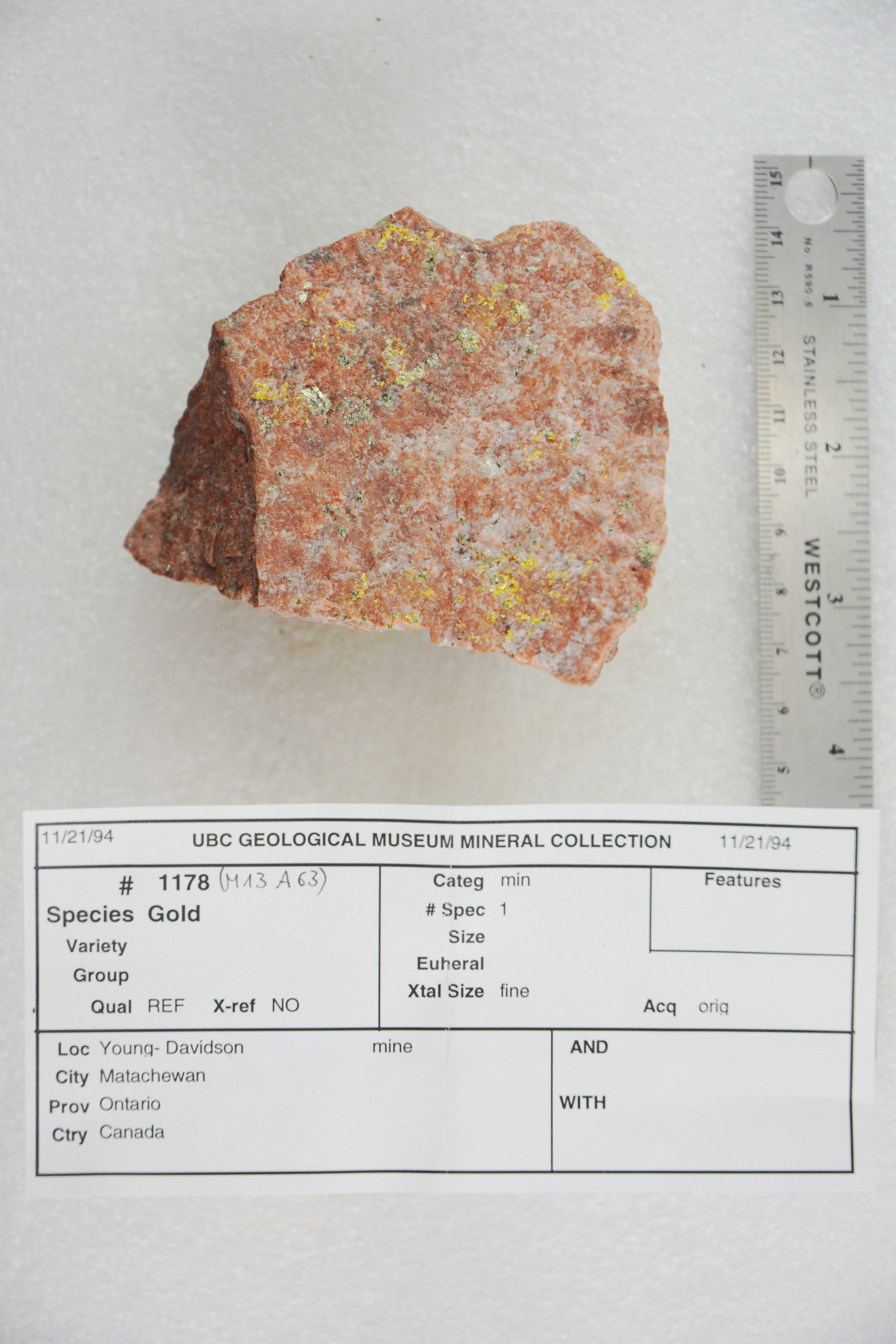
Gold ore from the mine, 1994

The Young-Davidson mine is a gold mine near Matachewan, Ontario in the Kirkland Lake area. It is one of the largest underground gold mines in Canada.

It exists in close proximity to the Matachewan Consolidated mine and is owned by Alamos Gold.

== Location and description ==
The site of the mine borders the Matachewan Consolidated mine on the west. It is located near the settlements of Dubreuilville, three kilometres west of Matachewan, sixty kilometres west of Kirkland Lake, Ontario, and approximately 100 kilometres southeast of Timmins.

The mine is within the district of Timiskaming.

The mine is one of the largest underground gold mines in Canada.

== History and ownership ==
Gold prospecting started near Matachewan since silver was discovered near Elk Lake in 1906. Jake Davidson found gold in Davidson Creek in 1916 in what would later become the Young-Davidson mine. In 1917, trenches and shallow cuts were created in the surface rock where more gold was discovered. Soon afterwards, Sam Otisse discovered gold while prospecting claims on land what later came under the ownership of Matachewan Consolidated Mine Ltd.

In 1920, the Davidson Gold Mining Company Limited managed the site and employed 55 men. The purchase of several adjoining properties in 1920 increase the site to 600 acres. The mine was primarily explored by Porcupine Goldfields Development and Finance Company and managed by N. J. Evered.

Nothing significant occurred at the mines from 1924 until January 1934 when the price of gold started to rise. In 1934, Hollinger Consolidated Gold Mines Ltd, after sampling the Young-Davidson site, built an ore processing mill; it started processing ore on September 8 and was able to process 500 tons per day.

Weldy Young was a part owner of the mine until his death in 1944.

Along with the neighbouring Matchewan Consolidated Mines a total of 956,117 ounces of gold and 165,598 ounces of silver was produced between 1934 and 1957 - worth $34,688,256 at the time. The mine closed in 1957.

Vancouver based company Northgate Minerals bough the Young-Davidson in 2005, and mining was restarted on September 10, 2010 In 2011, AuRico Gold bought Northgate and therefore the mine. AuRico Gold merged with Alamos Gold in 2015. In 2021, the mine produced 140,900 ounces of gold, generating $53.1 million of revenue for its owners.

A contracted worker fell four metres at the mine on January 27, 2021, resulting in Cementation Canada receiving a fine of $110,000. Mine worker Shane Allison (52) was struck by a vehicle and killed on November 29, 2022 Alamos Gold were issued with one requirement and three orders by the Ontario Ministry of Labour after the fatality. Miners are not unionised.

== See also ==
- Abitibi gold belt
