= Mulatos gold mine =

Gold mine in Mexico

- Location within Mexico Location within Sonora
- Location: Sahuaripa, Sonora; 28°39′02″N 108°44′33″W
- Products: Gold
- Type: Open-pit
- Active: 2005-present
- Company: Alamos Gold
- Website: www.alamosgold.com/operations/producing-mines/mulatos-mexico/default.aspx
- Acquired: 2003

Mulatos is a gold mine located in the town of Sahuaripa in Sonora, Mexico.

Alamos Gold bought the mine in 2003 and commercial production started in 2006.

A fatal landslide occurred at the mine in 2018, following a 2014 warning about the potential risk. An armed robbery of gold and silver alloy bars took place on the mine's runway in 2020.

== Description ==
The Mulatos mine is an open-pit gold mine, located in Sahuaripa, Sonora, Mexico. The state of Sonora produced 33% Mexico's total gold production in 2019. It is one of two mines owned by Alamos Gold in the state of Sonora, the other being El Chanate.

The mine is operated by the company's local subsidiary Minas de Oro Nacional.

== History ==
Alamos Gold bought the mine in 2003 for US$10 million and poured the first bar of gold on 2005. Commercial production started in April 2006.

A landslide at the mine in 2018 killed mine workers. The landslide was predicted in 2014 and the subject of a complaint to the Mexican National Commission on Human Rights.

Production increased during 2019. The mine was the target of five armed robbers who took security staff hostage and seized bars of doré (gold-silver alloy) bars from the mine's runway on April 8, 2020, before making off in their own small airplane. The National Bank of Canada reported that 2,600 ounces of the alloy were stolen.

In 2022, the mine's owners extended extraction to a satellite mine in the municipality of Puerto del Aire, where 428,000 ounces of gold are estimated to exist within 2.9 million tonnes of ore.

== See also ==
- List of gold mines
