= Aurico =

Aurico may refer to:

- AuRico Gold, a Canadian gold mining company
- Aurico, a fictional character from the Power Rangers mini-series Mighty Morphin Alien Rangers
