= Kirazli gold mine =

Turkish gold mine project

The Kirazli gold project (Kirazlı Projesi in Turkish) is a controversial proposed gold mine near the village of Kirazlı close to the town of Çanakkale in western Turkey.

== Background ==
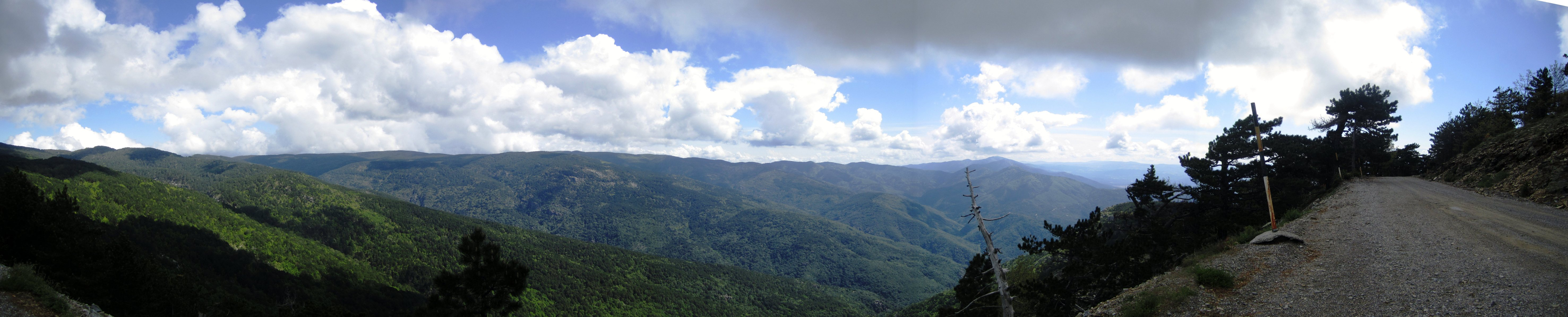
Ida mountains

The region of Mount Ida got partially declared as a national park in 1993. It is rich with minerals (particularly gold and silver). According to media reports, the Turkish state is giving the Canadian mining company Alamos Gold Inc. land and mining rights for US$90 million. The state is therefore contractually involved with 4.5 percent of the gold yield of the mine.

The project area is 20 km from Troja and 30 km from Çanakkale, at the foot of Kaz Dagi. The Ida Mountains are home to one of the largest contiguous forest areas in Turkey.

The ruling party AKP, MHP and state authorities refuse any information about the planned work and its effects.

== Project ==
In 2010, the Canadian company acquired the site for the planned Kirazli gold mine. Doğu Biga is the Turkish project partner of Alamos Gold. In 2017, Doğu Biga started on behalf of Alamos Gold to fell several thousand trees and remove the entire soil down to the bare rock. Around 200,000 trees have been cut so far, at least four times as much as permitted under the permit decision on the basis of the environmental impact assessment.

According to observers, 20,000 tonnes of cyanides (hydrocyanic acid and other salts) are used for gold extraction and the drinking water supply of up to 24 communities is at risk.

== Protest ==
In the mostly government-related Turkish media, it was not reported until the summer of 2019 on the extent of tree clearing and the destruction of vast unused natural areas. Only remote sensing images (satellite and drone pictures), commissioned by the environmental organization Tema, and further information were disseminated on social media in the summer of 2019. This led to broad protests in Turkey.

Citizens and conservationists set up a protest camp near the cleared areas.
