= Fort Matachewan =

Coordinates: 47.9941°N 80.6501°W

Fort Matachewan was a trading post set up by the Hudson's Bay Company in 1867, and is located 8 km north of the town of Matachewan, Ontario. This fort was primarily used for the fur trade, and as such the natives of the area often travelled to it to sell off their furs and pick up the staples of their diet. The fort was not a town site, but rather a large depot of stores. Eventually, a church was built on the grounds. Today the Fort is a crumbled relic of a time long past.

== Affiliations ==
The museum is affiliated with: CMA, CHIN, and Virtual Museum of Canada.

== See also ==
- Chronology of the War of 1812
- War of 1812 Campaigns
- List of forts
- War of 1812
- Upper Canada
