= AuRico Gold =

AuRico Gold Inc.
- Company type: Public
- Traded as: TSX: AUQ; NYSE: AUQ
- Industry: Mining Exploration
- Founded: 1986
- Defunct: 2015
- Fate: Merged with Alamos Gold
- Headquarters: Halifax, NS, Canada
- Key people: Scott Perry (President & CEO)
- Products: Gold Silver
- Website: www.auricogold.com

AuRico Gold was an intermediate gold mining and exploration company that, until August 2011, operated only in Mexico. It reached intermediate gold producer status in August 2011 when Northgate Minerals agreed to be taken over for C$1.46 billion. Gammon Gold was an exploration company until 2004 when it started producing for the first time. Assets also include silver and copper.

Aurico Gold merged with Alamos Gold in 2015.

== History ==
The company began as Golden Rock Explorations, Inc. on February 23, 1986 (date of incorporation). In 1998, it was renamed Gammon Lake Resources, Inc. Over the next 13 years, it changed names twice more, first to Gammon Gold Inc on June 18, 2007, and to AuRico Gold in May 2011.

On August 9, 2006, AuRico finalized the $451 million takeover of Mexgold Resources Inc., which owned the Guadalupe y Calvo gold and silver project in Mexico.

In April 2011, the company acquired Capital Gold for $408 million after 67% of Capital Gold's shareholders voted in favor of the deal. Assets included El Chanate and the Orion gold project in Mexico.

On May 16, 2011, it changed its name to AuRico Gold, a combination of Au ('gold') and Rico (meaning "rich" in Spanish).

On August 29, 2011, it acquired the Vancouver-based Northgate Minerals in a C$1.46 billion deal (US$1.49 billion). The new company (62% owned by AuRico shareholders with the other 38% residing with Northgate's shareholders) has 83% more gold resources than AuRico had beforehand. Including the takeover of Capital Gold, AuRico increased its gold reserves by about 70% in less than five months.

In 2015, AuRico Gold merged with Alamos Gold in a C$1.5 billion deal. Shareholders of AuRico Gold owned about 50% of the new company, which was still called Alamos Gold. As part of the deal, AuRico's Kemess project was spun off into a new company, AuRico Metals, which was acquired by Centerra Gold in 2017 for $310 million.

== Properties ==
There were two operations in Mexico and one operation in Canada in addition to several advanced development properties in Mexico and British Columbia.

- Young-Davidson — Located in Matachewan, Ontario. Gold reserves were near 3 million ounces giving it a mine life of about 15 years.
- Ocampo — Located in Mexico, produced since 2007. Consists of three mines - one open pit mine and two underground mines (Santa Eduviges and North-East; most of the gold resource is in the underground mines). The property is located in the Mexican state of Chihuahua. There is also a mill on the property that processes over 3,000 tonnes of ore per day. The mineralization formed from epithermal systems (warm water at shallow depth) with volcanic groups. Between the two main volcanic groups, the lower one (made up mostly of andesitic flows) is from where most of the gold and silver is being extracted. From January to June 2011, Ocampo produced 54,725 ounces of gold (up 16.9%) and 2.2456 million ounces of silver (up 10.7%). Ocampo is 100% owned by AuRico. Initially, it consisted of an open pit mine which was purchased from another company, Bolnisi, in December 2003.
- El Chanate — Owned by Santa Rita, S de RL de CV, a Mexican subsidiary of AuRico Gold Inc operating in the Mexican state of Sonora since 1997, it is the northernmost property and works for the exploration, extraction, benefit and commercialization of gold and silver minerals. It began production in May 2007 (40,000 ounces in the first year).

== Operations ==
In 2002, the company announced a strategic alliance with Bolnisi Gold NL, to take its Ocampo Project in Mexico into production.

== Exploration projects ==
- Kemess Underground — Located near Kemess Mine and served by the Kemess Creek Airport.
- Goldmining project at Mount Ida region
