= La Coipa =

Mine in Atacama Region, Chile

- Location within Atacama Region Location within Chile
- Location: Diego de Almagro, Atacama Region, Chile; 26°48′52.56″S 69°16′5.77″W
- Products: Gold, silver
- Production: 167,870 ounces gold
- Financial year: 2023
- Opened: 1993
- Company: Kinross Gold

La Coipa is a gold mine in the Andes and Atacama Desert of northern Chile. It lies 140 km northeast of the city of Copiapó at an altitude of 3,800 to 4,200 meters above sea level. The area of mine is cold, very arid, windy and experiences slight snowfall in winter. In 2023 it produced 4,759 kg of gold making it rank fourth in gold production in Chile, ahead of Collahuasi and after Escondida, Centinela and El Peñón. Exploration leading to the establishment of La Coipa mine begun in the late 1970s following the realization of the size of the El Indio deposit farther south. The deposit itself was discovered in the 1980–1982 period. It opened in 1993 and its mine closure is planned for 2032. It is fully owned by Kinross Gold since 2007 when the company bought out Goldcorp Inc. that owned 50% of the mining operation.

The rocks hosting the gold mineralization are varied. They include shale and sandstone of Triassic age and tuff and tuffaceous breccia that date to times slightly before or after the Oligocene–Miocene boundary. The mining operation at La Coipa has two main mineralization areas: Ladera-Farel1ón and Coipa Norte. The orebodies tend to follow some faults, most of which are north-south and northeast-southwest and locally associate with some rock types. The shapes of the orebodies have been described as belonging to two types; "semitabular" and "mushroom-like". Some of the richest mineralizations are associated with argillic alteration.

By 1991 the cutoff grade was 1 gram gold (or gold-value equivalent) per metric ton.
