= Yécora, Sonora =

Yécora
- Town and Municipality
- Location within Sonora Location within Mexico
- Coordinates: 28°22′N 108°55′W
- Country: Mexico
- State: Sonora
- Elevation: 1,576 m (5,171 ft)

Population (2020)
  - Total: 4,793
- Time zone: UTC-7 (Zona Pacífico)

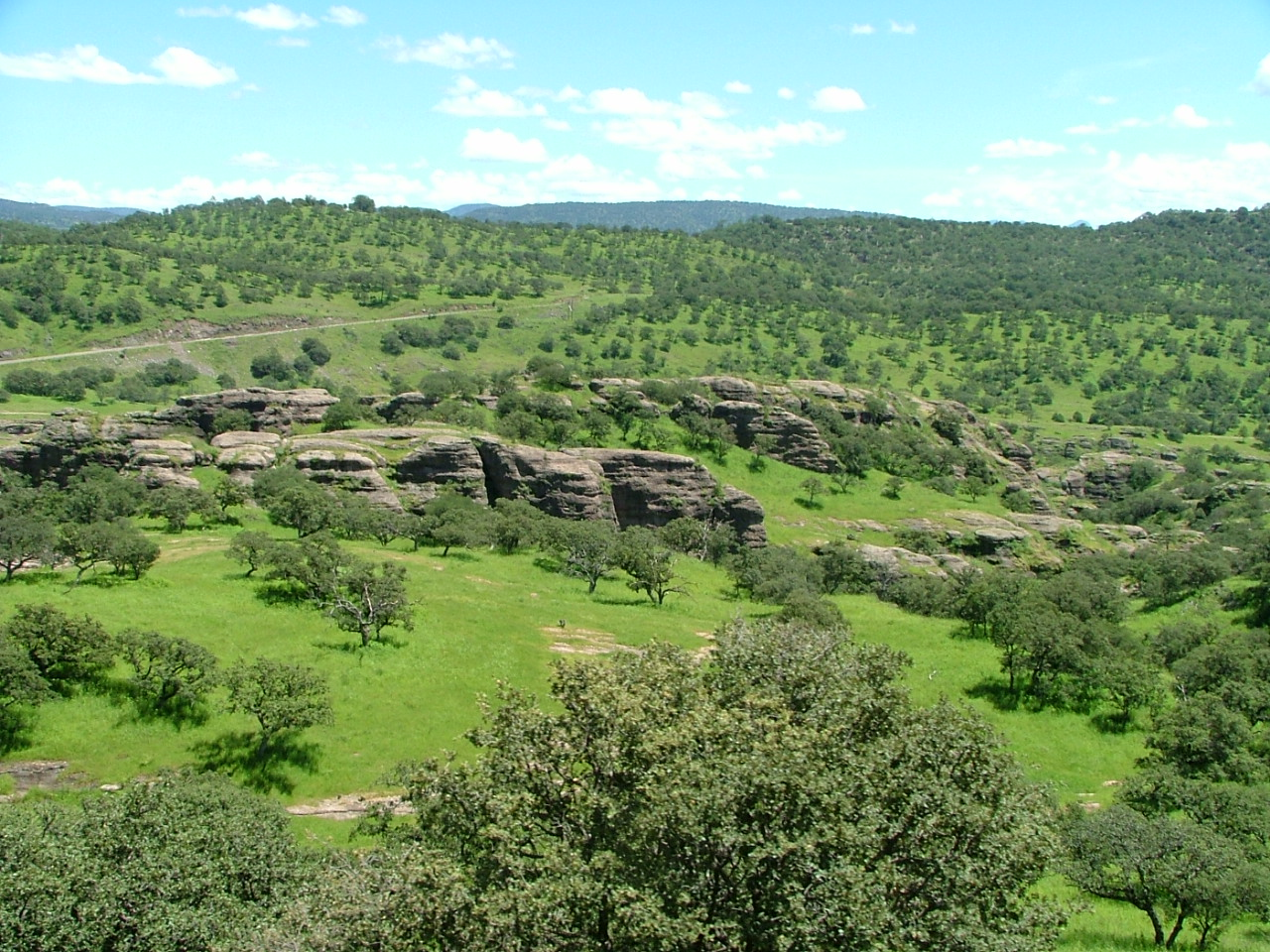
Yecora, Sonora

Yécora is a small town, and its surrounding municipality of the same name, in the Mexican state of Sonora. An approximate population for Yécora is 3171.

== History ==
In 1673, the Jesuit missionary Alonso Victoria founded the town of San Idelfonso of Yécora. San Idelfonso of Yécora was later named La Trinidad, a Judicial District in the municipality of Sahuaripa. The municipality held this name until August 28, 1916, when Governor of Sonora Adolfo de la Huerta changed the town's name to Yécora.

The name Yécora is derived from an identically named town and municipality located in the province of Álava, in the Basque Country (autonomous community), northern Spain. In the Basque language, the name translates to Iekora.

== Geography ==
Yécora is located at Latitude = 28.3710, Longitude = -108.9269 with an elevation of 5,173 feet (1,576 m). The town is bordered on the east by the state of Chihuahua, to the north by the municipalities of Sahuaripa and Southeast Rosario, to the west by the municipality Suaqui Grande, and the northwest by the municipality of Ónavas. Yécora has an area of 1,279 square miles (3,312 square kilometers), accounting for 1.79 percent of total state.

=== Climate ===
Yécora has a subtropical highland climate (Köppen climate classification: Cwb), featuring the same climate type as Mexico City, although the town has much more and more severe temperature extremes and with more erratic rainfall patterns than Mexico City. with warm summers and mild winters, often presenting freezing temperatures. With 944 millimeters (37.2 in) of rain, Yécora is one of the rainiest places in the mostly dry and arid state of Sonora. Also, Yécora presents lower temperatures than the rest of the state due to its high altitude (1,576 meters (5171 ft) above sea level).

Climate data for Yécora, Sonora (1981–2010), extremes (1967–present)
Month	Jan	Feb	Mar	Apr	May	Jun	Jul	Aug	Sep	Oct	Nov	Dec	Year
Record high °C (°F)	28.0 (82.4)	33.5 (92.3)	34.5 (94.1)	40.5 (104.9)	39.0 (102.2)	42.5 (108.5)	38.0 (100.4)	36.5 (97.7)	38.5 (101.3)	34.0 (93.2)	31.0 (87.8)	30.5 (86.9)	42.5 (108.5)
Mean daily maximum °C (°F)	17.6 (63.7)	18.3 (64.9)	20.7 (69.3)	24.4 (75.9)	28.3 (82.9)	31.0 (87.8)	28.6 (83.5)	28.0 (82.4)	27.6 (81.7)	24.7 (76.5)	20.4 (68.7)	17.8 (64.0)	24.0 (75.2)
Daily mean °C (°F)	7.0 (44.6)	7.9 (46.2)	9.8 (49.6)	13.2 (55.8)	17.1 (62.8)	21.4 (70.5)	21.7 (71.1)	21.3 (70.3)	19.9 (67.8)	15.2 (59.4)	9.9 (49.8)	7.1 (44.8)	14.3 (57.7)
Mean daily minimum °C (°F)	−3.6 (25.5)	−2.6 (27.3)	−1.1 (30.0)	2.1 (35.8)	5.9 (42.6)	11.9 (53.4)	14.9 (58.8)	14.5 (58.1)	12.3 (54.1)	5.7 (42.3)	−0.7 (30.7)	−3.5 (25.7)	4.7 (40.5)
Record low °C (°F)	−13.0 (8.6)	−13.5 (7.7)	−10.0 (14.0)	−6.0 (21.2)	−5.0 (23.0)	3.5 (38.3)	2.0 (35.6)	2.0 (35.6)	1.0 (33.8)	−5.0 (23.0)	−9.5 (14.9)	−14.5 (5.9)	−14.5 (5.9)
Average precipitation mm (inches)	41.1 (1.62)	41.3 (1.63)	20.1 (0.79)	11.5 (0.45)	12.9 (0.51)	68.9 (2.71)	250.0 (9.84)	251.0 (9.88)	115.8 (4.56)	51.1 (2.01)	26.0 (1.02)	54.3 (2.14)	944.0 (37.17)
Average precipitation days (≥ 0.1 mm)	3.8	3.2	2.0	1.4	1.8	6.8	20.1	18.6	9.9	3.9	2.4	3.4	77.3
Average snowy days	0.16	0.03	0.03	0	0	0	0	0	0	0	0	0.07	0.29
Source 1: Servicio Meteorológico National
Source 2: Colegio de Postgraduados
