= Sahuaripa =

Town in Sonora, Mexico

Coat of arms of Sonora

Sahuaripa is a town in the Mexican state of Sonora, municipality of Sahuaripa. The area is 5,694.4 km^{2}. The town had a population of 5,792 in 2005. The town and municipal seat had a population of 3,807 in 2000.

== Geography ==
The municipal seat is located in the east of the state at 29°03′N 109°14′W at an elevation of 1,165 meters above sea level. Municipal boundaries are with Nácori Chico in the north, Yécora and Onavas in the south, Soyopa in the southwest, Bacanora in the west, San Pedro de la Cueva in the northwest, and the state of Chihuahua in the east. See detailed map at Maps of Sonora

=== Climate ===
Climate data for Sahuaripa (1991–2020 normals, extremes 1942–present)
Month	Jan	Feb	Mar	Apr	May	Jun	Jul	Aug	Sep	Oct	Nov	Dec	Year
Record high °C (°F)	38.5 (101.3)	41 (106)	48 (118)	44 (111)	48 (118)	50 (122)	48.5 (119.3)	48 (118)	49.5 (121.1)	49.5 (121.1)	47.5 (117.5)	40 (104)	50 (122)
Mean daily maximum °C (°F)	23.2 (73.8)	25.5 (77.9)	29.5 (85.1)	33.9 (93.0)	38.4 (101.1)	42.9 (109.2)	40.1 (104.2)	38.9 (102.0)	37.8 (100.0)	34.9 (94.8)	28.8 (83.8)	22.9 (73.2)	33.1 (91.6)
Daily mean °C (°F)	13.1 (55.6)	15.4 (59.7)	18.7 (65.7)	22.4 (72.3)	27.0 (80.6)	32.9 (91.2)	32.1 (89.8)	31.1 (88.0)	29.4 (84.9)	24.8 (76.6)	18.3 (64.9)	13.1 (55.6)	23.2 (73.8)
Mean daily minimum °C (°F)	3.0 (37.4)	5.3 (41.5)	7.8 (46.0)	11.0 (51.8)	15.6 (60.1)	22.9 (73.2)	24.1 (75.4)	23.4 (74.1)	21.0 (69.8)	14.7 (58.5)	7.9 (46.2)	3.2 (37.8)	13.3 (55.9)
Record low °C (°F)	−8 (18)	−8 (18)	−3 (27)	0 (32)	4 (39)	8.5 (47.3)	12 (54)	17 (63)	10 (50)	−2 (28)	−4 (25)	−8 (18)	−8 (18)
Average precipitation mm (inches)	30.3 (1.19)	28.9 (1.14)	15.6 (0.61)	6.8 (0.27)	6.6 (0.26)	58.8 (2.31)	235.1 (9.26)	168.4 (6.63)	78.0 (3.07)	34.3 (1.35)	30.8 (1.21)	39.5 (1.56)	733.1 (28.86)
Average rainy days	2.5	2.3	1.4	0.5	0.6	3.9	14.0	12.7	6.2	2.7	2.3	2.8	51.9
Source: Servicio Meteorológico Nacional

== Etymology ==
In the Opata language, Sahuaripa means "Yellow Ant". It is first referenced by name during one of the initial Spanish incursions in June 1567 by Francisco de Ibarra as "Zaguaripa". Based on descriptions, there is historical speculation that Alvar Nuñez Cabeza de Vaca may have passed through the Sahuaripa Valley in 1536. Andres Perez de Ribas, SJ entered the valley in 1617 and recorded the encounter with the Opata chief Sisibotari in his work, "Historia de los Triunfos de Nuestra Santa Fe". The first inhabitants were the Opata, among whom was the great chief Sisibotárit, who was lord of 70 villages. The Spanish founded a settlement in 1641 with the name of Nuestra Señora de los Angeles de Sahuaripa.

== History ==
Records show the following missionary priests were stationed at Sahuaripa:

- Pedro Mendes, SJ (1627–1636) {age 72−81}
- Bartolome Castano, SJ (1634−1640)
- Cristobal Garcia, SJ (1644–1646)
- Agustin Vargas, SJ (1648−1658)
- Cristobal Rojas, SJ (1657–1659)
- Tomas de Hidalgo, SJ (1660–1662)
- Pedro Quiles de Cuellar, SJ (1659−1674)
- Domingo Miguel, SJ (1676–1690),
- Natal Lombardo, SJ (1690–1696){author of "Arte de la Lengua Teguima vulgarmente llamada Opata" published 1702}
- Juan Ventura Ferrer, SJ (1696–1720)
- Fco. Javier Fernandes, SJ (1723−?)
- Prudencio Romero, SJ (1726)
- Jose Escalona, SJ (?–1743)
- Cristobal de Lauria, SJ (1744–1750)
- Tomas Miranda, SJ (1750?)
- Tomás Pérez de la Busta, SJ (1761−1766)
- Bartolomé Sáenz, SJ (1767)

1767 marked the end of the Jesuit Period in Sonora. Initiating the Franciscan Period was a report titled as follows: Relación de este pueblo y misión de San Miguel de Sahuaripa y sus anexos, pedida por su majestad, que Dios guarde, como expresa por orden de 20 de octubre de 1776, según se advierte en el superior despacho, arreglada a la instrucción expedida por el excelentísimo señor virrey de este reino de Nueva España, also known as the "Relacion de Sahuaripa".

- Pedro de la Cueva, OFM (1769–1785){went on to San Luis Rey/Soledad/San Jose, Alta California. He was a concelebrant of the dedication mass of the then newly constructed San Juan Capistrano Church}
- Ramon Mendieta, OFM (1803–1807)
- Jose Cuevas, OFM (1807–1813)
- Dionisio Onederra, OFM (1814–1824)

In 1803, the prominent son of the Spanish Navy Capt. Don Jose Cañizares who was the first to enter the San Francisco Bay by sea aboard the San Carlos on July 27, 1775; Pedro Pablo Cañizares and his wife Ana Gertrudis Rudecinda Arguello Moraga, (daughter of Alta and Baja California Governor, Don Jose Dario Arguello), arrived in Sahuaripa to administer the Spanish Royal Mine of La Trinidad in Ostimuri. After several years at Sahuaripa, he went on to take charge of the Port and Custom house at San Blas in the territory of Tepic, present-day Nayarit.

During the penultimate campaign to capture Geronimo and the Chiricahua Apache, on January 11, 1886, US Army Capt. Emmet Crawford, was shot by Capt. Mauricio Corredor of the Mexican Federales despite the former waving a white flag. Crawford died on January 18 in Teopari within the municipality of Sahuaripa. Corredor was in pursuit of the Apaches from the mining town of Dolores, Chihuahua, east of Natora. Crawford is buried at Arlington National Cemetery. In July 1886 during the last campaign to subdue the Chiricahua Apache led by Geronimo, Captains Henry Lawton and Leonard Wood, (who would later become decorated generals in the US Army), and a group of soldiers and scouts traveled as far south as Sahuaripa via Nacori Chico in search of Geronimo. In Sahuaripa they met with the priest, district prefect and physician Dr. Teodoro Wendlandt. (Note: Dr. Theodor Wendlandt was born 1841 at Loenburg, Wuertemberg, Germany. He was a Union veteran who served in Company M, 1st California Cavalry. He left the U.S. after the Civil War and settled in Sahuaripa, his wife Antonia's birthplace. Dr. Wendlandt was admitted to the Sawtelle Soldiers' Home at Los Angeles, California, where he was a resident from March 10 until December 22, 1915. He received Civil War veteran's pension No. 1126840.) In the memoirs of Geronimo written late in his life, in 1905, at Fort Sill, Oklahoma, Geronimo cited 7 different occasions having camped in the mountains of Sahuaripa. Also prominent in Geronimo's memoir is the village of Casa Grande which is in the municipality of Tepache north of Sahuaripa. His descriptions of the area are fitting with the terrain and demonstrate the Chiricahua Apache were very active in the area between Tepache, Los Taraices and Badesi.

A diplomatic row between the United States and Mexico was initiated on September 13, 1887, by the Ambassador of the United States in Mexico, Thomas Courtland Manning, when the prefect of Sahuaripa, Don Loreto Trujillo, imprisoned U.S. Citizen and California native, Jose Q. Garcia, for failing to vote in an election. Sonora governor Luis E. Torres opened an inquest into the affair to which the following persons testified: Ruperto Galvan, Narciso Torrecillas, Geronimo Cordova, Manuel Maria Esparza, Severiano Guerrero, Jesus Cordova, Maxamiliano Sagariboy, Rafael Macen, Jesus Hurtado, Manuel Hurtado, Miguel Garcia, A.T. Willem, Eleazar Torres, Juan Francisco Torres, Theodore Wendlandt, (Note: see footnote 1.) Macedonio Sanes, Ignacio Romero, Jhon Willem, Henry W. Walter, Leonardo Monje and Jacobo T. Biebrich. (Note: see reference 8.) The US Ambassador and the US Consul at Guaymas, A. Willard, sought the removal and punishment of the Sahuaripa prefect.

As a prelude to the Mexican Revolution, Sahuaripa was a destination point of exile for persons involved in the Upheaval of Tomochic, Chihuahua that involved the Saint of Cabora Movement. The Maderista Revolution in Sonora was initiated by Colonel Severiano Talamante of Navojoa in 1910 and took flight to be among sympathizers in Sahuaripa. At the plaza of Sahuaripa, Talamante and his sons recruited a force that planned to march to Chihuahua and join the forces of Francisco I Madero. A militia of National troops was gathered under the command of neighboring Moctezuma's Prefect, Francisco Chapa to march on Sahuaripa and capture the rebels. On January 28, 1911, rifle fire echoed throughout the town. The rebels retreated to the old Church to hold off the overwhelming force. Talamante ultimately surrendered his force and the following morning, before dawn, Talamante and his two sons went before the firing squad and were summarily executed on the northern outskirts of the town. This epic battle is considered the first of the Mexican Revolution in Sonora.

On September 1, 1922, Sahuaripa local elections made headlines as far away as Tucson when Jesus Quiroz Macen shot and killed the Municipal president elect, Miguel R. Paz and a witness Chalo Montaño who was to be a secretary in his administration. They were to take office on September 15, 1922.

In October 1935 during the governorship of Rodolfo Elias Calles, a military force of "Cardenistas," officially the 20 Regimiento under the command of General Agustin Mustieles and Captains Sandoval, Camacho, and Basurto and Lt. Ojeda, flying red and black flags stormed into the town in search of Bishop Juan Navarrete y Guerrero and made the church their barracks. The bishop had fled Hermosillo in November 1934 to the Sierra and the soldiers were seeking his hiding place. (The Bishop was actually in hiding in the high Sierra near Nacozari and Huasabas.) The presbyter at Sahuaripa, Msgr. Porfirio Cornidez, was in exile in Pomona, CA and later Los Angeles due to the 3rd persecution of the Catholic Church in Mexico of 1932–1937 that was underway. All the sacred art and articles of the church were gathered in a pile and burned. While the fire burned there was an explosion and in the plume flew the upper portion of the image of Our Lady of Guadalupe which was gathered by a child named Alejandro Aguayo who secretly took it to the ladies of the Altar Society. The rescued image is presently in the sacristy of the church with the burn marks visible. There exists an oral tradition in Sahuaripa that has not been corroborated from the Cristero time period, that a priest hiding in the Zetasora Sierra was turned into the authorities by a rancher.

By 1973, the rise of the Institutional Revolutionary Party (PRI) in Mexico had reached its apogee of power corresponding with the power of the imperial presidency of Luis Echeverria. Sahuaripa became a case study in this unchecked power of government. Native son, Carlos Armando Biébrich Torres, barely 33 years old and an undersecretary of the Federal Interior Secretariat (Gobernacion), was appointed gubernatorial candidate. The state constitution was changed to allow his candidacy due to his age. His youth and vitality were popular and made for a successful campaign. His initials and an arrow tilted upward, CAB↑, were painted on the southern end of the Cordon of the Tasajera mountain range above the Campeña creek facing west so that it was visible upon entrance into the valley through El Puerto Pass and throughout the town. The image lasted into the early 1980s. Two years into his governorship, in 1975, the imperial presidency forced his resignation as scapegoat measure when troops fired on a Yaqui Valley demonstration over land rights that resulted in ten deaths. Biébrich was later exonerated of any culpability. This episode created a widespread feeling in Sahuaripa of opportunities lost.

== Neighborhoods ==
The neighborhoods that comprise the present Municipal Seat are the following: Northern end between the cemetery and the Del Oro Creek is Colonia Ricardo Duran. Between the Del Oro Creek toward the south to the town's central Plaza is referred to as "Abajo" or "Pa' 'Bajo". The Streets closest to the east side of the town, nearest the Sahuaripa River are called "La Orilla Del Rio." The West side of the town near a prominent hill of the same name is called "Turacachi." In the Turacachi neighborhood there is a rodeo ground. Toward the South from the main Plaza is called "Arriba" or "Pa' 'Rriba". Abajo means lower and Arriba is upper which is in reference to the flow of the adjacent Sahuaripa River. The extreme south end of the town is called "Buchuari". There is an unusually wide street on the Western part of town that despite being officially named Mariscal street, it is referred to as "La Calle Ancha" translated, "the wide street." There is a park in the central-south part of town called "La Alameda" translated "the grove."

== Local festival ==
Every year the town holds its annual "Fiestas", beginning December 12 through December 20, in honor of the patron saint, Our Lady of Guadalupe that are reminiscent of Mardi Gras in New Orleans in that the whole community is transformed in a festive atmosphere. In October 2007 Sahuaripa was the starting point of a large cavalcade.

== Roads and communications ==
The town is served by a paved highway 104 linking with the capital, Hermosillo, which lies at a distance of 206 km. There is also a paved highway 117 running north and south communicating it with Yecora and Ciudad Obregón in the south and Moctezuma, Nacozari and Douglas, Arizona, to the north. There are daily buses to Hermosillo. In November 2009, bus service began 4 days a week between Sahuaripa and Moctezuma. From Moctezuma there are links to Agua Prieta and Douglas, AZ. Sahuaripa counts with land line telephone provided by telmex, Cell Phone service with 3G network, gsm, tdma, pcs, cdma with telcel gsm.

== Education and health care ==
There are three preschools, three elementary schools, a junior high school, and a high school in the city. However, there is no hospital. 12 doctors and 9 nurses attend the population in small clinics.

== Economy ==
Agriculture and cattle raising are the most important economic activities of Sahuaripa. Grasses are grown as fodder for the cattle and there is modest cultivation of beans and corn for self-consumption. The cattle herd was substantial with 64,000 head counted in 2000. Organic garlic is grown in small plots near the village of Santo Tomas for Wild Oats Markets natural food stores in the U.S. Additional small-scale, sustainable production of local products like naturally dehydrated grass-fed beef called "machaca" is gaining momentum along with heirloom red chili pepper products, handmade panela cheese, and ground cornmeal called "pinol". Local indigenous red pepper production could provide a better alternative than cattle feed for the limited arable land in the narrow valleys along creeks and rivers. These types of agricultural plots are referred to as Maguechis or Mahwechis. Chili production could not rival New Mexico's Hatch Valley but could be comparable to that in northern New Mexico counties. Ristras of red pepper chilies are as common here as in northern New Mexico as well as dehydrated sweetcorn known as "chicos". The most prominent employer in the district is the Mulatos gold mine owned by Alamos Gold, Inc., of Toronto, ON, Canada. The Mexican national Secretariat of Economy first granted the concession to Placer Dome of Vancouver, BC, CA, but the project was transferred. It is an open-pit operation with the leach pad on the Mulatos River watershed. The Mulatos river flows into the Aros river near the village of Guadalupe El Grande. As of late 2009, mine drilling exploration is taking place in the headwaters area of the San Felipe Arroyo which becomes the Cañada Larga flowing into the Los Otates Arroyo at Tesoberachi and subsequently emptying into the Sahuaripa River at Baderi. The Mawechis that could be affected by any residual flows in this watershed would be San Felipe, La Tinaja, Tierra de Chalio, Tierra de Chatuz, Lower Tasajera, El Sobaco, Los Moloncos, La Redonda, Baderi, Naquehui and Batacomachi.

== Other Communities ==
In addition to the municipal seat, other small settlements include:

- Valle de Tacupeto
- Guisamopa
- Mulatos
- Matarachi
- Cajon de Onapa
- Santo Tomas
- Sehuadehuachi
- La Mesita del Cuajari
- Natora
- Guadalupe el Grande

Ranches within the municipality include:

- San Felipe
- El Tuli
- El Chiltepin
- Chinoverachi
- La Calera
- La Buniga
- La Carreta
- La Campena
- Los Temaquis
- El Ranchito
- La Mesa Grande
- Mocori
- La Mesa de Batochi
- Chunivari
- La Tinaja
- Los Cochis
- La Tasajera
- Los Hoyancos
- El Carrizalito
- Los Chupaderos
- Tesoberachi
- Baderi
- El Arreadero
- Chipajora
- El Babiso
- Naquehui
- Agua Caliente
- La Mula
- El Alamo
- El Toro
- El Saucito
- Babaco
- Gohocopa
- Basopa
- Los Guerigos
- Los Ocotes
- El Tabacote
- Cureda
- El Sapo
- Los Chinos
- Los Pavos
- Badesi
- La Cebadilla
- Chamada
- La Cieneguita
- La Chipiona
- Morobabi
- La Alazana
- Los Bajios
- Tiopari
- El Mudo
- La Matancita
- La Mina del Mo
- El Zamotal
- El Hecho
- Zetasora

== Sources consulted ==
- Enciclopedia de los Municipios de México
- INEGI
- Papers relating to the Foreign Relations of the United States transmitted to the 49th Congress, December 6, 1886
- Gardner, Charles Kitchell (1860). A Dictionary of All Officers.
