= Matachewan Consolidated mine =

Gold mine in Ontario, Canada

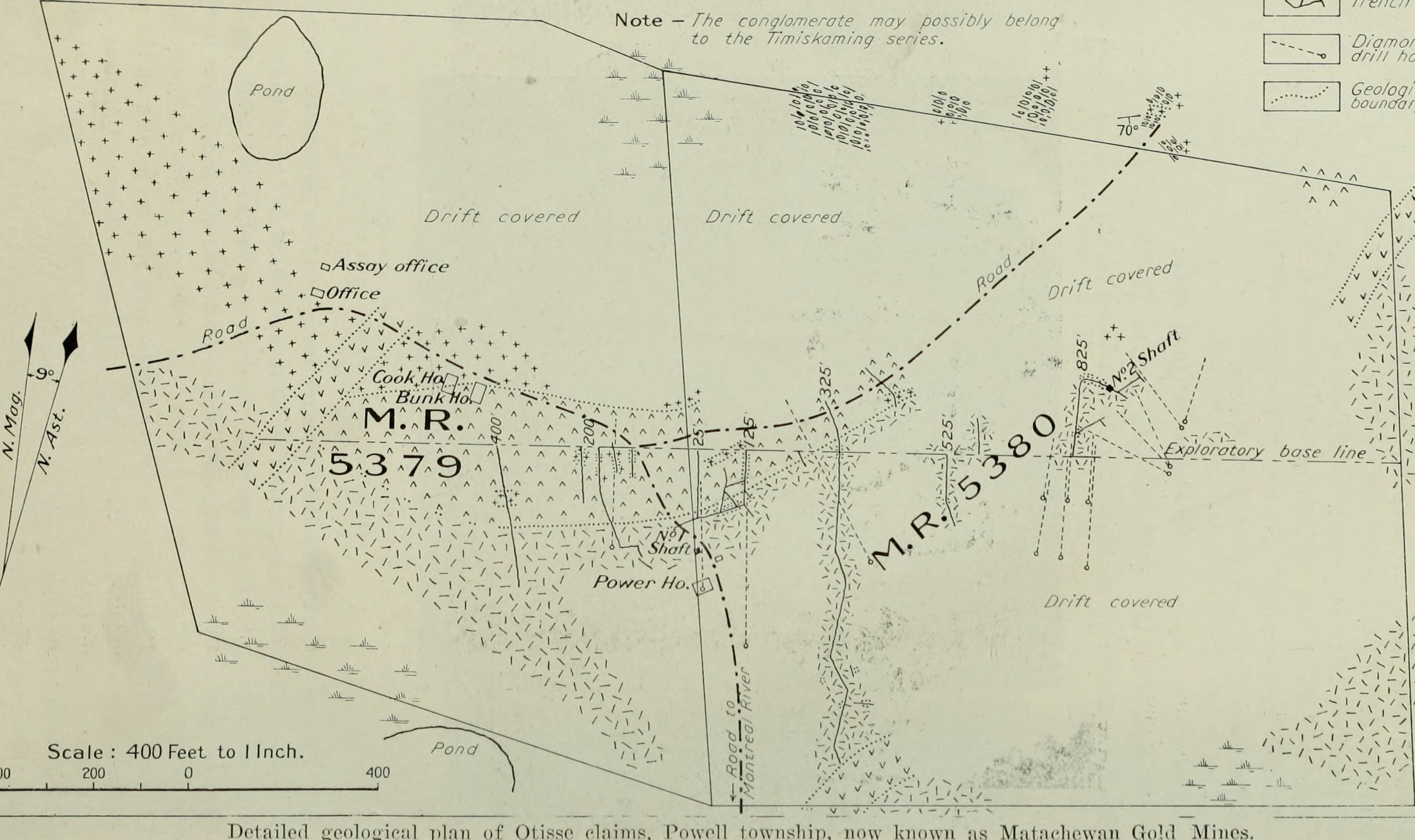
- 1920 geological plan of Sam Otisse's claim

- Location within Ontario
- Location: near Matachewan, Kirkland Lake area, Ontario, Canada; 47°56′42″N 80°40′26″W
- Products: Gold
- Discovered: Early 20th century
- Closed: 1954

The Matachewan Consolidated mine is a former gold mine near Matachewan, Ontario, Canada, in the Kirkland Lake area.

The site is adjacent to the Young-Davidson mine and was owned by Matachewan Consolidated Mine Ltd.

== Location and description ==
The site of the mine is borders the Young-Davidson mine on the east. It is located three kilometres west of Matachewan, sixty kilometres west of Kirkland Lake, Ontario, and approximately 100 kilometres southeast of Timmins. The mine is within the district of Timiskaming and is close to the Montreal River and 23 miles northeast of Elk Lake.

It is located at longitude -80.67377 and latitude 47.94493.

== History and ownership ==
Gold prospecting started near Matachewan since silver was discovered near Elk Lake in 1906. Jake Davidson found gold in Davidson Creek in 1916 in what would later become the Young-Davidson mine. Soon afterwards, Sam Otisse discovered gold while prospecting claims on land what later became the Matachewan Consolidated Mine, and owned by Matachewan Consolidated Mine Ltd.

The mine was initially explored by Colorado-Ontario Development Company Limited. Matachewan Canadian Gold Limited became Matachewan Canadian Mines Limited in 1919. By 1920, 40 men were working at the mine under the management of T. J. Flynn. Equipment on site included two boilers, a 3-drill compressor and a hoist, servicing a 168 and a 37 feet deep shaft.

Nothing significant occurred at the mines from 1924 until January 1934 when the price of gold started to rise. Also in 1934, the mine was connected to the Hydro Electric Power Commission of Ontario's electrical grid.

The Matchewan Consolidated Mines Ltd and Young-Davidson Mines Ltd produced a total of 956,117 ounces of gold and 165,598 ounces of silver between 1934 and 1957 worth $34,688,256 at the time. The Matachewan Consolidated mine closed in 1954.

On October 17, 1990 after water levels in the Otisse Lake rose, the mine's tailings dam failed. 150,000 cubic metres of tailings flowed into the Montreal River, increasing lead levels to unsafe levels. Drinking water between Elk Lake and Lachford was declared unfit for human consumption.

== See also ==
- Abitibi gold belt
