= El Chanate =

Defunct gold mine in Mexico

- Location within Mexico Location within Sonora
- Location: Altar Municipality, Sonora, Mexico; 30°47′47″N 111°55′15″W
- Products: Gold
- Type: Open-pit
- Discovered: Early 19th-century
- Company: Alamos Gold

Local impacts
- Pollution: Cyanide
- Impacted: Local soil contamination

El Chanate is a former gold mine in Sonora, Mexico owned by Alamos Gold.

Artisanal mining started in the early 19th-century and continued until 2018, at which point operations reduced to leaching.

== Description ==
El Chanate is an open-pit gold mine located in the Altar Municipality of Sonora, close to the Mexico–United States border, in the northwest of Sonora, Mexico that is owned by Canadian corporation Alamos Gold. The mine covers 4,618 hectares and is located around a fault, above sedimentary and volcanic rocks. Twenty-seven million tonnes of gold ore was estimated to be on site in 2014, grading 0.74g/t of gold.

== History ==
The mine was worked by artisan miners since the early 19th-century. Denver-based Chanate Gold Mines Co. was registered in 1898.

In the 2007, Capital Gold Corp's subsidiary Minera Santa Rita, started working the mine.

In 2015, a merger between AuRico Gold and Alamos Gold, transferred the mine's ownership to the later company.

In 2016, the mine's operators spilled 10,000 litres of cyanide solution, some was captured in ponds and some contained local soil, before being relocated into a lined leach pad.

Mining stopped in late 2018, when operations switched to residual leaching. As of 2023, the mine's owners had stopped listed it as a producing mine.

== See also ==
- List of gold mines
