= Alamos Gold =

Canadian gold mining company

Alamos Gold Inc.
- Type: Public
- Traded as: TSX: AGI; S&P/TSX Composite Index NYSE: AGI
- Industry: Metals & Mining
- Founded: February 21, 2003; 23 years ago
- Headquarters: Toronto, Canada
- Key people: Paul J. Murphy (chairman); John A. McCluskey (CEO); Luc Guimond (COO); Greg Fisher (CFO)
- Products: Gold
- Revenue: ▲US$1.81 billion (2025)
- Net income: ▲US$886 million (2025)
- Subsidiaries: AuRico Gold; Alamos Gold Holdings (Netherlands)
- Website: alamosgold.com

Alamos Gold Inc. ("Alamos") is a Canadian multinational gold producer, headquartered in Toronto, Canada. Alamos operates three mines across North America, and has six further projects in development.

Alamos Gold is engaged in the mining and extraction of, and exploration for, precious metals, primarily gold. Alamos owns and operates three mines, including the Young-Davidson Mine and the Island Gold Mine in Ontario, Canada and the Mulatos Mine in Sonora, Mexico. In 2022, the Young-Davidson mine produced 195,000 ounces of gold, the Island Gold mine produced 140,900 ounces of gold, and Mulatos mine produced 121,300 ounces of gold. Alamos' total gold production in 2022 was 457,200 ounces. Alamos also owns several development-stage projects: the Lynn Lake Project in Lynn Lake, Manitoba, the Kirazlı, the Ağı Dağı, and Çamyurt Projects in the Biga district of northwestern Turkey, and the Quartz Mountain Property in Oregon, United States.

The company has been recognized for achieving best-in-class environmental, social and corporate governance (ESG) ratings.

Alamos is listed on the Toronto Stock Exchange and the New York Stock Exchange, both under the ticker "AGI", and is a component of the S&P/TSX Composite Index.

== History ==
=== Founding and early years ===
Alamos Gold was formed in 2003 through the merger of Alamos Minerals and National Gold, resulting in the acquisition of the Mulatos deposit for US$10 million, at a time when the gold price was US$300 per ounce.

As the founding asset for the company, the Mulatos mine was built at a cost of approximately US$74 million. Construction of the open-pit mine, 220 km east of the city of Hermosillo in the Sierra Madre Occidental mountain range of Sonora state, began in the summer of 2004, and the company poured first gold in July 2005. A feasibility study at US$370 per oz. gold predicted a seven-year mine life that would take the heap-leach operation out to 2012.

In 2010, Alamos acquired the Ağı Dağı and Kirazlı advanced-stage development projects from Teck Resources and Fronteer Development Group for total consideration of US$90 million.

In 2012, Alamos CEO John McCluskey was named 2012 Ontario Entrepreneur Of The Year by Ernst & Young and received recognition for growing the company to more than 500 people and showing a commitment to excellence in environmental management, social responsibility and health and safety. That year, the company produced its one millionth ounce of gold and generated the billionth dollar of revenue from the Mulatos operation.

In 2018, he received the Murray Pezim Award for Perseverance and Success in Financing Mineral Exploration by the British Columbia Association for Mineral Exploration, in recognition of his role in the acquisition, financing, and encouragement of successive discoveries at Mulatos, as well as his ongoing success as CEO of Alamos.

In 2023, Alamos CEO John McCluskey was named recipient of the Viola R. MacMillan Award, from the Prospectors & Developers Association of Canada for showing leadership and a willingness to take risks in the acquisition and development of the Island Gold mine in Northern Ontario.

=== 2013 – present ===
In 2013, the company completed two acquisitions: Esperanza Resources for US$69 million, with assets in Morelos, Mexico, and Orsa Ventures, an exploration stage company with assets in Oregon, United States.

That same year, Alamos published its first annual Sustainability Report, began reporting against the Global Reporting Initiative, and was recognized for the fifth year in a row by Mexican Center for Philanthropy and the Alliance for Corporate Responsibility (CEMEFI) as a “Socially Responsible Mining Company”.

In 2015, Alamos merged with AuRico Gold in a transaction structured as a merger of equals with a transaction equity value of approximately US$1.5 billion. The agreement combined two top-quality, highly-complementary asset portfolios, including two long-life, cash flow-generating gold mines: AuRico's Young-Davidson mine in Ontario, Canada, and Alamos' Mulatos mine in Sonora, Mexico. The two mines, producing over 160,000 ounces and over 79,000 ounces of gold respectively in 2015, were designed and constructed to the highest environmental and safety standards and were operated with a strong commitment to social responsibility.

In 2015, Alamos announced the acquisition of Carlisle Goldfields Limited for US$22.1 million and its primary asset – the Lynn Lake project – located in Lynn Lake, Manitoba. In 2017, Alamos announced its feasibility study at Lynn Lake project showing proven and probable reserves of 26.8 million tonnes graded 1.89 grams per tonne, with contained gold of 1.6 million ounces. On January 7, 2016, Alamos completed the acquisition of Carlisle Goldfields Limited and its 100% ownership of the Lynn Lake Project located in Lynn Lake, Manitoba.

In 2015, the El Chanate mine won the “Best Practices in Social Responsibility” Award by CEMEFI, the Mexican Center for Philanthropy, the Ethics and Values Award by the Confederation of Industrial Commerce, and reported its medical clinic served over 7,000 medical visits and provided health care and medicine to 80% of the population of Mulatos and Matarachi. The company also established a Stakeholder Advisory Committee in Turkey with the elected village heads (muhtars) of Kirazlı, Karacalar, Karaibrahimler, Alanköy, Yukarışapçı and Aşağışağçı villages. The company began its design of a fresh Altınzeybek-2 water reservoir with a water holding capacity of 3.17 million cubic meters – of which 92% of the water will be used by local communities as clean, healthy drinking and utility water. The company’s scholarship program provided educational scholarships for 59 economically disadvantaged students, kindergarten through university, from the Talan and Etili villages.

In 2017, Alamos acquired Richmont Mines Inc. in a deal valued at US$770 million acquiring its asset, the Island Gold mine. Located in northern Ontario approximately a six-hour drive from its Young-Davidson mine, the Island Gold mine boosted Alamos to up over 500,000 ounces of annualized production. With a target to increase capacity up to 1,200 tonnes per day, Alamos expanded the mill and upgraded its mining fleet in 2018. In the third quarter of 2018, Alamos successfully commissioned the Phase I expansion at the Island Gold mine, increasing mill capacity to 1,100 tonnes per day.

In 2017, the company reported it has received the Forestry Permits required for the development of its Kirazli gold project from the Forestry General Directorate in Turkey, and on February 22, 2017, announced updated positive studies on each of its Turkish Projects, including feasibility studies on both its Kirazlı and Ağı Dağı Projects; as well, a preliminary economic assessment on its Çamyurt Project. The following year, the company announced it was granted the GSM (Business Opening and Operation) permit required for the development of its Kirazli project, by the Çanakkale Governorship in Turkey. Two years later in 2019, the company announced that it had been granted the Operating Permit from the Turkish Department of Energy and Natural Resources allowing for the start of earthworks on the Kirazl project.

In late 2018, the company successfully obtained the Cerro Pelon MIA (Environmental Impact Assessment) and Cerro Pelon CUS (Change of Land Use) permits for the high return Cerro Pelon project in Mexico and commenced full scale construction.

In 2019, Alamos announced a doubling of its dividend to $0.01 per common share quarterly, from US $0.01 semi-annually. The company also announced the Mulatos mine produced its two millionth ounce of gold. That same year, the company announced receipt of an expansion permit for the Island Gold Mine, allowing for the Phase II expansion to 1,200 tonnes per day.

Alamos had become among roughly 10% of the mining companies on the S&P/TSX Composite Index to have at least 30% of its board represented by women in 2019. Additionally that year, the company announced it was the recipient of the "Best Corporate Social Responsibility Practice 2019" award from the Mexican Center for Philanthropy (Cemefi) and the Alliance for Corporate Social Responsibility in Mexico (AliaRSE) for the company's voluntary relocation program of residents from Mulatos to Matarachi in Mexico.

In August 2019, protests were held outside Alamos' Kirazli Project despite being criticized by the local villagers claiming protesters came to the region with misinformation. The protestors alleged that Alamos cut down four times the number of trees than it declared in an environmental impact report and that the use of cyanide to extract gold could contaminate the soil and waters of a nearby dam. The Turkish government rejected claims that the mine will damage the environment and denied cyanide will be used. In an interview Alamos CEO John McCluskey denied that cyanide would leak into the surrounding area and pointed out that Alamos had pre-paid for future reforestation at the site once the project is completed. McCluskey also suggested that the project had been the subject of deliberate misinformation aimed at advancing a political agenda.

Alamos reported it suspended all construction activities on its Kirazli project pending the renewal of its Turkish mining operating license which expired on October 13, 2019, citing misinformation about the project which gave rise to protests and social media inaccuracies.

In 2020, the company reported its updated Mineral Reserves and Resources as of December 31, 2019, including an increase of Mineral Reserves and Resources at the Island Gold mine of 921,000 ounces, net of mining depletion.

That same year, Alamos announced a 50% increase to the quarterly dividend to US$0.015 per common share and introduced a Dividend Reinvestment and Share Purchase Plan (“DRIP”).

Alamos announced a temporary suspension of operations at the Mulatos mine due to COVID-19 which was subsequent to announcing a temporary suspension of operations at the Island Gold mine in late March to help prevent the spread of the virus. Operations resumed by May.

In April 2020, a group of five armed robbers intercepted a shipment of gold and silver alloy bars that were being loaded onto a plane for transport at Alamos' Mulatos mine, then fled in a light aircraft. The company did not disclose the amount or the value of the bars taken, but said that the loss was covered by insurance.

In July 2020, the company made several announcements. Alamos announced the completion of the lower mine expansion at Young-Davidson with the successful commissioning of the Northgate shaft, unlocking a 13 year mineral reserve life, large resource base, significant exploration potential, and positioning the mine to deliver solid free cash flow over the long term.

The company also announced the completion of its Phase III expansion study for the Island Gold mine, which resulted in an announcement to expand its operations at the mine with the construction of a shaft, to increase production from 1,200 to 2,000 tonnes per day, and double the mine-life to 16 years.

That same month, Alamos announced the construction of La Yaqui Grande, a decision the company said was based on results of a positive internal economic study and the project being seven kilometres from its existing Mulatos operation, and representing the company’s next low-cost, high-return project in Sonora’s Mulatos district.

In December 2020, the company acquired Trillium Mining Corporation for cash consideration of US$19.5 million, increasing its land package adjacent to, and along strike from the Island Gold deposit, by approximately 60%.

In 2021, the company reported its Mineral Reserves and Resources as of December 31, 2020, highlighting Island Gold’s Mineral Reserves and Resources increased by a million ounces, net of mining depletion, at a discovery cost of US$8 per ounce.

Also in 2021, through its Dutch subsidiaries, the company sought $1 billion compensation payment from the government of Turkey for its role in not renewing the mining licenses related to its Kirazli Project.

In February 2022, Alamos announced the sale of the Esperanza Gold Project in Morelos State, Mexico for total consideration of up to $60 million.

In 2022, the Company announced Phase 3+ Expansion of Island Gold to 2,400 tonnes per day, which will more than double the mine life, transform the mine into one of Canada’s largest and most profitable gold mines upon completion in 2026, and result in a 35% reduction in life of mine greenhouse gas (GHG) emissions relative to the current operation.

The same month, Alamos Gold completed construction ahead of schedule of La Yaqui Grande, part of its Mulatos mining complex in Sonora, Mexico, and was the recipient of the 2022 Silver Helmet Award by the Mexico Mining Chamber (CAMIMEX) which rewards companies with the best safety indicators in mining processes.

In 2022, Alamos announced a company-wide target of a 30% reduction in GHG emissions by 2030, and in 2023 the Company released its first Climate Change report.

In 2023, Alamos Gold expanded its exploration footprint in the Algoma region of Northern Ontario by acquiring Manitou Gold, a junior miner with 40,000 hectares of prospective ground adjacent to the Alamos Island Gold mine property.

Between 2022-2023, Alamos Gold signed agreements with Indigenous communities located in Canada. This included Michipicoten First Nation in Ontario, Batchewana First Nation in Ontario, as well as with Marcel Colomb First Nation in Manitoba. In 2022, Alamos Gold was the recipient of the inaugural Reconciliation Award from the Manitoba Prospector & Developers Association in recognition of its engagement with Marcel Colomb First Nation.

In 2023, Alamos Gold received regulatory approval from the Canadian and Manitoba governments for the Lynn Lake project. In August 2023, the Company updated its feasibility study for the Lynn Lake project, reporting mineral reserves as 44% larger than previously thought, totalling 47.6 million tonnes grading 1.52 g/t gold and containing 2.3 million oz, and supporting mining for 17 years, up from 10 years as reported in the previous study.

Initiated in 2021, Alamos Gold sponsors scholarships annually for students enrolled in mining-related programs at Canadian post-secondary educational institutions, as part of the Young Mining Professionals Scholarship Fund – the largest mining scholarship fund in the world.

== Operations ==
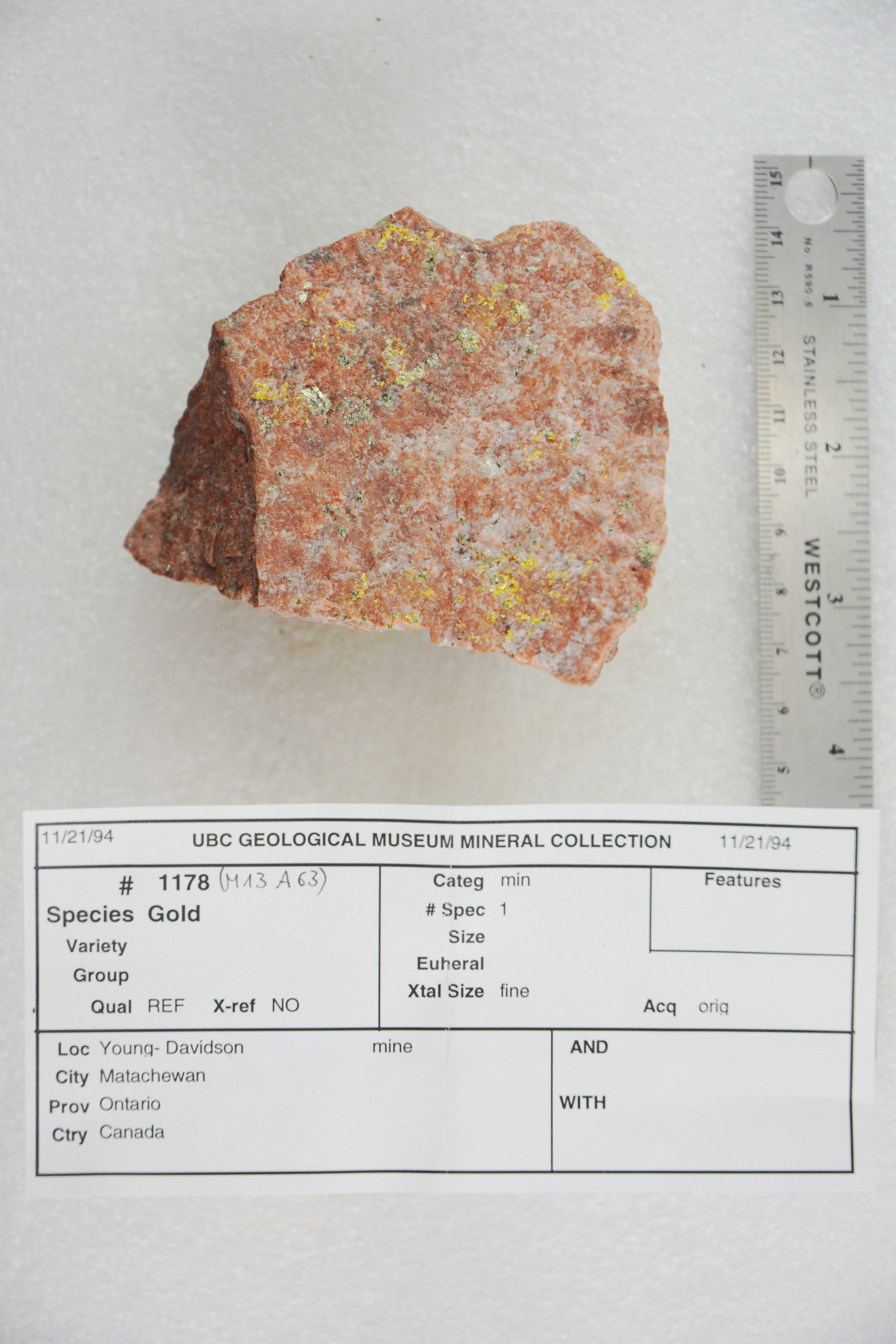
A mineral sample from the Young-Davidson Mine.

=== Producing Mines ===
==== Young-Davidson Mine ====
The Young-Davidson mine is located near the town of Matachewan, approximately 60 kilometres west of Kirkland Lake in northern Ontario. The property consists of contiguous mineral leases and claims totaling approximately 11,698 acres and is situated on the site of two past producing mines that produced almost one million ounces of gold between 1934 and 1957. The Young-Davidson mine consists of an underground mine, currently mining at a rate of approximately 6,700 tonnes per day and increasing to 7,500 tonnes per day by the end of 2020, a conventional flotation and carbon-in-leach (“CIL”) mill and associated infrastructure. The mine has been in continuous operation since 2012.

==== Island Gold Mine ====
The Island Gold mine is located approximately 83 kilometres northeast of Wawa, in northern Ontario. Island Gold consists of an underground mine, currently mining at a rate of approximately 1,200 tonnes per day, a conventional carbon-in-pulp (“CIP”) mill and associated infrastructure. The company acquired Island Gold through its 2017 acquisition of Richmont. The mine has been in continuous operation since 2007.

==== Mulatos Mine ====
The Mulatos mine is located 220 kilometres east of Hermosillo in the state of Sonora in northwest Mexico. The company owns 100% of the Mulatos mine and several other prospective exploration targets throughout the district. The mine includes a number of open pit mines, two crushing facilities, a heap leaching facility, a high-grade mill, gold processing facilities and related infrastructure. The mine has been in continuous operation since 2005, producing over two million ounces in that period.

Name	Country
Young-Davidson Mine	Canada
Island Gold Mine	Canada
Mulatos Mine	Mexico

=== Developments ===
Name	Country
Kirazli Project	Turkey
Ağı Dağı Project	Turkey
Çamyurt Project	Turkey
Lynn Lake Project	Canada
Quartz Mountain Project	United States

== Finances ==
Year End	Total assets (mil. USD)
2022	$3,674.2
2021	$3,621.5
2020	$3,636.5
2019	$3,396.5
2018	$3,265.2
2017	$3,313.8
2016	$2,492.2
2015	$2,462.2

== Carbon footprint ==
Alamos Gold reported Total CO2e emissions (Direct + Indirect) for 31 December 2020 at 159 Kt (-4.3 /-2.6% y-o-y).

Alamos Gold's Total CO2e emissions (Direct + Indirect) (in kilotonnes)
Dec 2018	Dec 2019	Dec 2020	Dec 2021
169	163	159	189

== See also ==
- Gold mining
