= Matachewan =

- Township (single-tier)
- Township of Matachewan
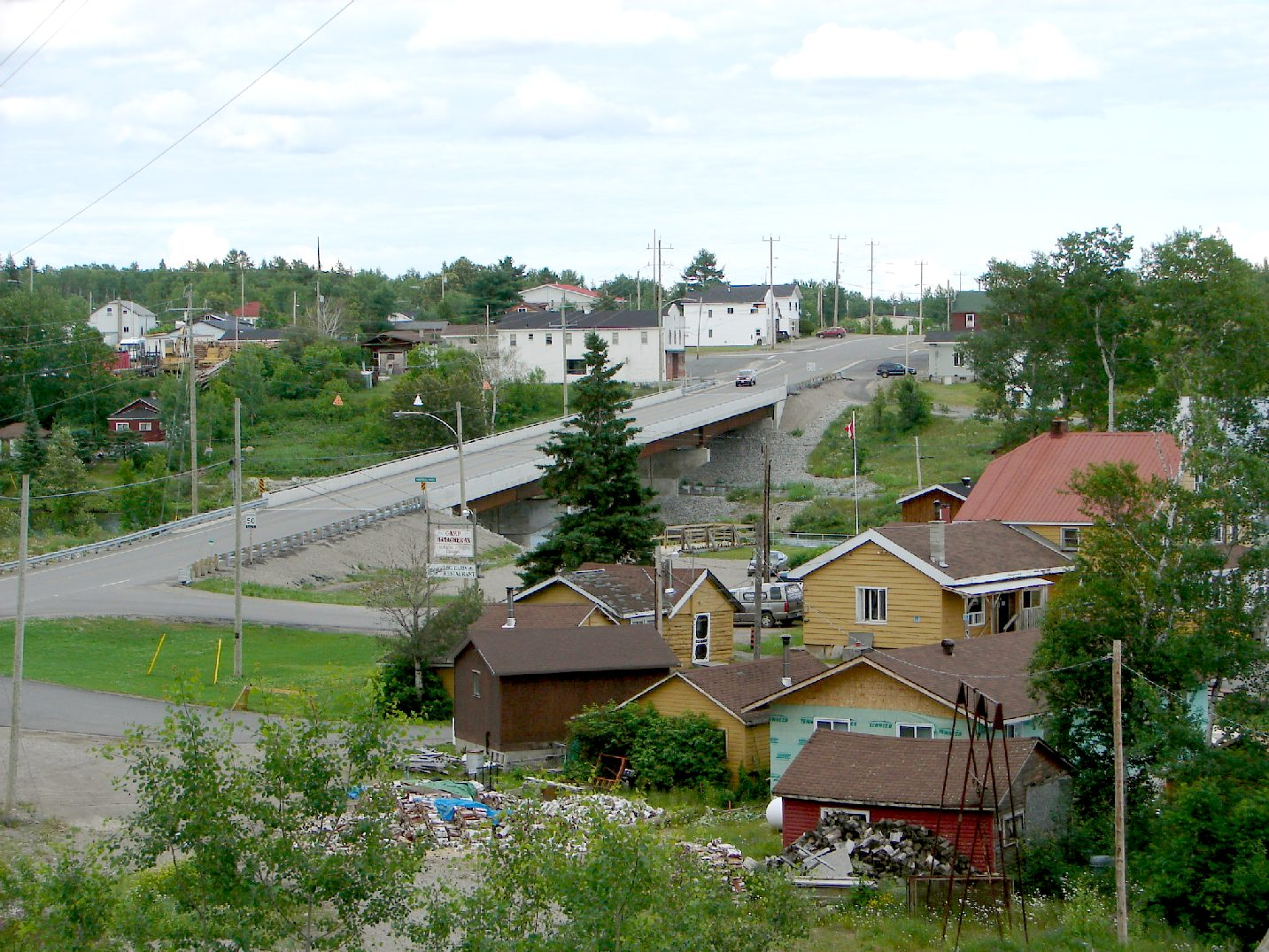
- Motto: Where the highway ends... the adventure begins!
- Location within Ontario
- Coordinates: 48°00′N 80°39′W
- Country: Canada
- Province: Ontario
- District: Timiskaming
- Settled: 1920s
- Incorporated: 1976 (Improvement District)
- Incorporated: 1995 (Township)

Government
  - Type: Township
  - Mayor: Mike Young
  - Fed. riding: Kapuskasing—Timmins—Mushkegowuk
  - Prov. riding: Timiskaming—Cochrane

Area
  - Land: 539.56 km^{2} (208.33 sq mi)

Population (2021)
  - Total: 268
  - Density: 0.5/km^{2} (1.3/sq mi)
- Time zone: UTC-5 (EST)
  - Summer (DST): UTC-4 (EDT)
- Postal Code: P0K 1M0
- Area codes: 705, 249
- Website: www.matachewan.com

Matachewan is a township in Timiskaming District, Northeastern Ontario, Canada, located at the end of Highway 66 along the Montreal River. The name is derived from the Cree word for "meeting of the currents".

The town's main economy is based on mineral mining, mainly gold mining, with some tourism.

== History ==
Matachewan began as a trading post of the Hudson's Bay Company, called Fort Matachewan, located about 8 kilometres (5.0 mi) north of the present town site. It consisted only of a large depot and stores, with a church added later on. The local First Nations, who traded their furs here, would camp along the Montreal River but not settle permanently.

Jake Davidson discovered gold in 1916 and teamed up with Weldy Young in 1930 to start the Young-Davidson mine. Sam Otisse staked a claim next to Davidson in 1917, which became the Matachewan Consolidated Mines. Alex Mosher staked claims which became the Ashley Gold Mine (1932-1936).

The impetus to the town's growth came in the 1920s when mineral deposits, such as gold, copper, and molybdenite, were found in the area. From then on it experienced boom and bust cycles of typical mining towns, depending on the swings in commodity prices, but its economy has gradually shifted to forestry and tourism.

Matachewan was first incorporated in 1947 out of unorganized areas, but in 1962, it reverted to unorganized. In January 1976, the Improvement District of Matachewan was formed, and in 1995, it was incorporated as a township.

The Otisse Lake overflowed into mine tailings on 17 Oct. 1990, and 170,000 cubic metres of mine slimes entered the Matachewan River.

In 2006, a medivac helipad was built to help accommodate the possibility of injuries that may occur at the Young-Davidson mine site. In 2008, an old and worn out wooden bridge over the Montreal River which was built in 1937 was replaced with a new steel-concrete reinforced structure for safety reasons regarding the heavy traffic to/from the mine.

== Geology ==
Matachewan is on the southwest portion of the Abitibi greenstone belt and within the Abitibi gold belt. Between 1933 and 1957, the Young-Davidson Mine and the Matachewan Consolidated Mine produced 9.6 million tonnes of ore containing 3.1 grams of gold per ton and 0.93 grams per ton of silver. Between 1979 and 1980, Pamour Porcupine Mines Limited open-pit mining produced 18,000 tonnes of ore containing more than 3.4 grams per ton of gold.

== Demographics ==
In the 2021 Census of Population conducted by Statistics Canada, Matachewan had a population of 268 living in 134 of its 202 total private dwellings, a change of 19.1% from its 2016 population of 225. With a land area of 539.56 km^{2} (208.33 sq mi), it had a population density of 0.5/km^{2} (1.3/sq mi) in 2021.

Canada census – Matachewan community profile

	2021	2016	2011
Population	268 (+19.1% from 2016)	225 (-45.0% from 2011)	409 (9.1% from 2006)
Land area	539.56 km^{2} (208.33 sq mi)	543.58 km^{2} (209.88 sq mi)	543.63 km^{2} (209.90 sq mi)
Population density	0.5/km^{2} (1.3/sq mi)	0.4/km^{2} (1.0/sq mi)	0.75/km^{2} (1.9/sq mi)
Median age	53.2 (M: 52.8, F: 53.2)	52.7 (M: 52.2, F: 52.9)	50.8 (M: 48.0, F: 52.5)
Private dwellings	202 (total) 134 (occupied)	166 (total)	260 (total)
Median household income	$67,500	$57,216

Notes: 2011 population and housing figures corrected.
References: 2021 2016 2011

Historical census populations – Matachewan

Year	Pop.	±%
1951	1,437	—
1956	1,063	−26.0%
1961	1,031	−3.0%
1976	619	−40.0%
1981	452	−27.0%
1986	491	+8.6%
1991	453	−7.7%

Year	Pop.	±%
1996	402	−11.3%
2001	308	−23.4%
2006	375	+21.8%
2011	409	+9.1%
2016	225	−45.0%
2021	268	+19.1%

Population counts are not adjusted for boundary changes.
Source: Statistics Canada

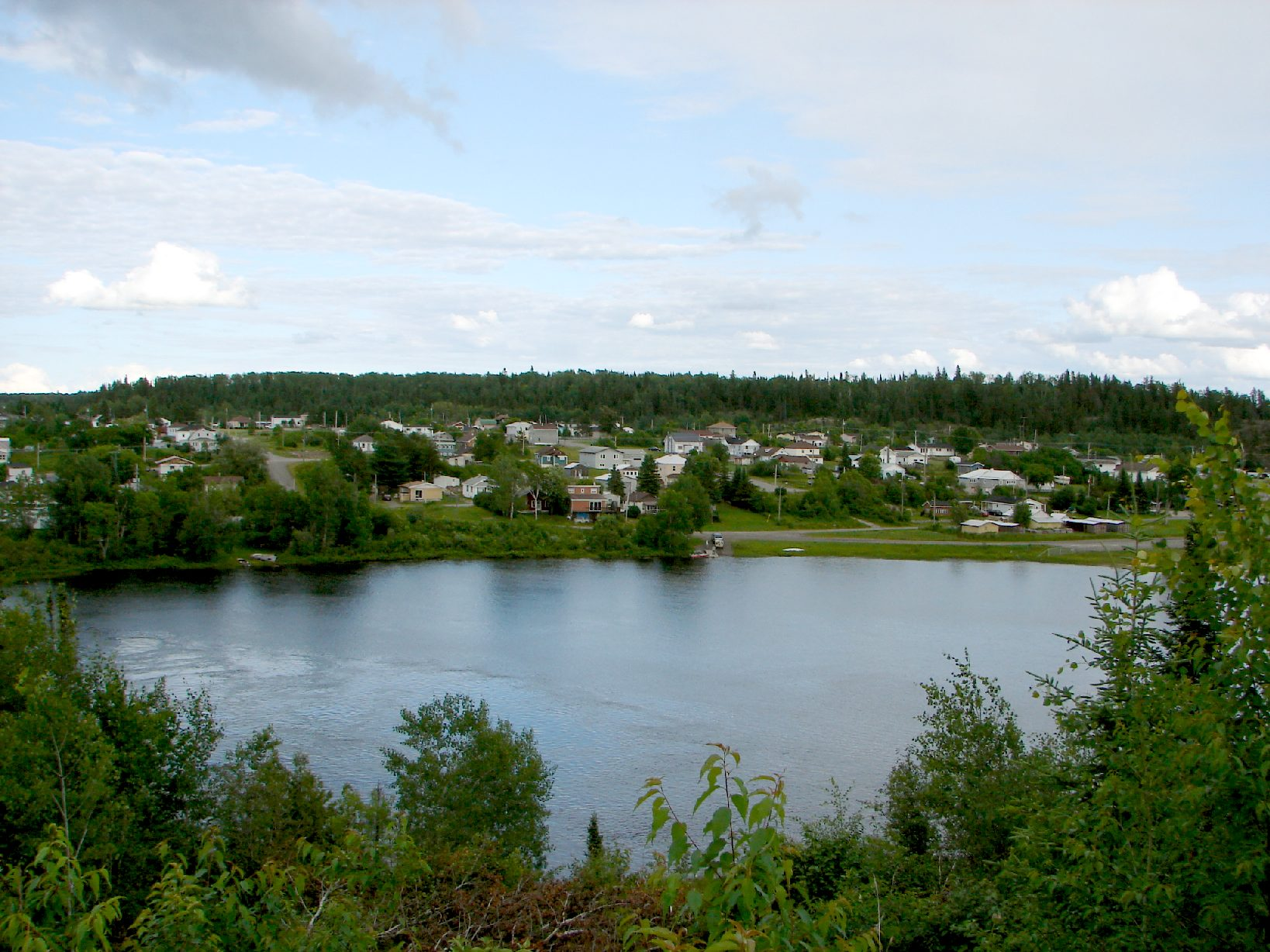
Matachewan as seen across the Montreal River.

== Culture ==
Matachewan is known for celebrating local cultures every July during the Matachewan Villages Festival event.

== Transportation ==
Provincial highways:

- Highway 65
- Highway 66

== See also ==
- List of townships in Ontario
- List of francophone communities in Ontario
- Kirkland Lake
- Porcupine Gold Rush
- Cobalt silver rush
- Red Lake, Ontario
- Greenstone, Ontario
- Hemlo, Ontario
