= El Peñón mine =

Gold mine in Chile

- Interactive map of El Peñón mine
- Location: Antofagasta Region, Chile
- Products: Gold, silver
- Opened: 1999
- Company: Pan American Silver
- Acquired: 2023

The El Peñón mine is an underground mine that is of one of the most productive gold mines in Chile and in the world. It also produces silver.

In 2023 it had a production of 180,230 ounces gold and ranked second or third in gold production among mines in Chile, behind Escondida and on par with Centinela.

It was formerly owned by Yamana Gold but is since April 2023 owned by Pan American Silver.

The mine is located in the northern part of Chile in Antofagasta Region. The mine had by 2013 estimated reserves of 2.72 million oz of gold and 84.6 million oz of silver. It has a planned closure year in 2031.
