= Spanish missions in the Sonoran Desert =

17th to 19th-century Catholic religious outposts

The Spanish missions in the Sonoran Desert (Spanish: Misiones jesuíticas en el desierto de Sonora) are a series of Jesuit Catholic religious outposts established by the Spanish Catholic Jesuits and other orders for religious conversions of the Pima and Tohono O'odham indigenous peoples residing in the Sonoran Desert. An added goal was giving Spain a colonial presence in their frontier territory of the Sonora y Sinaloa Province in the Viceroyalty of New Spain, and relocating by Indian Reductions (Reducciones de Indios) settlements and encomiendas for agricultural, ranching, and mining labor.

== Geography and history ==
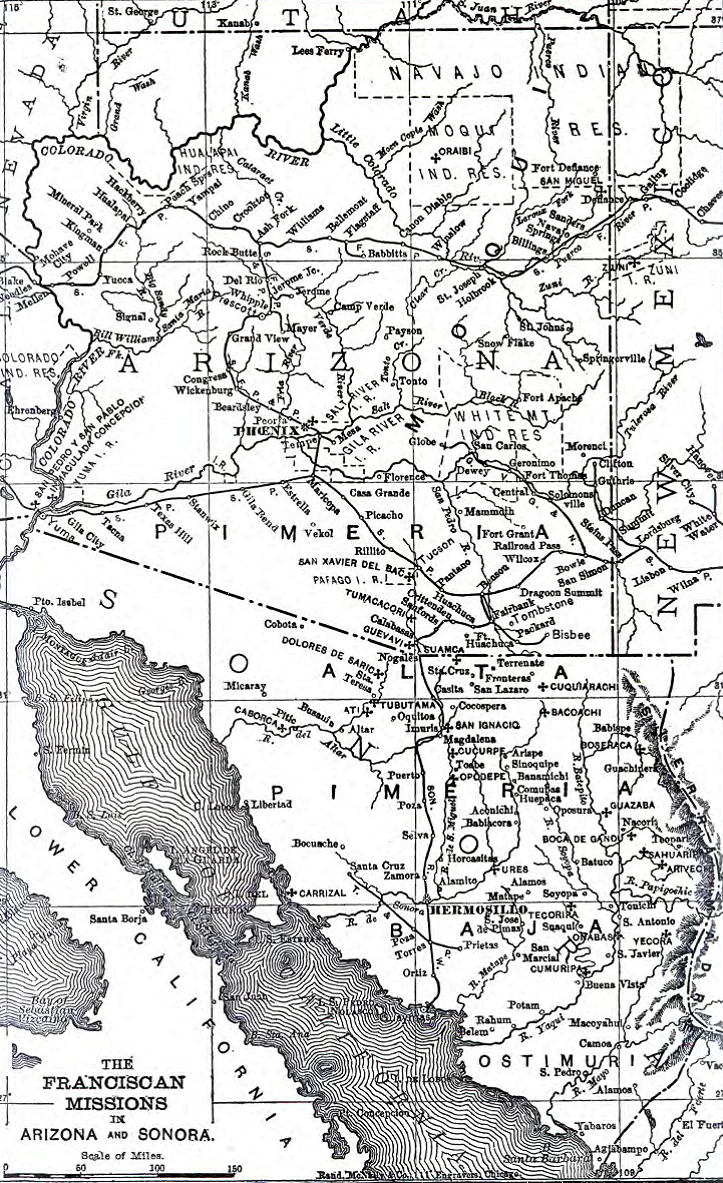
Spanish missions in the Sonoran Desert

The missions are in an area of the Sonoran Desert, then called "Pimería Alta de Sonora y Sinaloa" (Upper Pima of Sonora and Sinaloa), now divided between the Mexican state of Sonora and the U.S. state of Arizona. Jesuits in missions in Northwestern Mexico wrote reports that throw light on the indigenous peoples they evangelized. A 1601 report, Relación de la Provincia de Nuestra Señora de Sinaloa was published in 1945. An important Jesuit report concerned the resistance in 1691 of the Tarahumara to evangelization, Historia de la tercera rebelión tarahumara. Another important Jesuit account of evangelization in Sonora is Estado y descripción de Sonora, 1730, which has considerable information about the size of the indigenous population, culture, and languages.

In the Spring of 1687, Jesuit missionary named Father Eusebio Francisco Kino lived and worked with the Native Americans (including the Sobaipuri) in the area called the "Pimería Alta," or "Upper Pima Country," which presently is located in northern Sonora and southern Arizona. During Father Eusebio Kino's stay in the Pimería Alta, he founded over twenty missions in eight mission districts.

On February 3, 1768, King Carlos III ordered the expulsion of the Jesuits from Spain and its overseas empire. Despite the order, many Jesuits remained in and around the present day Tucson, Arizona, as late as the 1780s.

The Jesuit missionaries were subsequently replaced by Franciscans, who divided the existing missions between two institutes: the Colegio de Querétaro and the Province of Santiago de Xalisco.

These missions were later put under the jurisdiction of the new Diocese of Sonora (with the see in Arizpe), erected on May 7, 1779. In 1888 the see was moved to Hermosillo. On September 1, 1959 the name was changed to "Diocese of Hermosillo"; it was elevated to Archdiocese on July 13, 1963.

== Missions ==
Missions were organized hierarchically. Each province contained several missions (cabaceras), which might have dependent visitas. (A particularly successful visita might be promoted to a mission in its own right.) Each mission or visita in turn had subordinate pueblos.

The five provinces of Sonora and Sinaloa were:

- Tarahumara
- Sinaloa
- Ostimuri
- Sonora
- Pimería

As of the Jesuit expulsion in 1767, there were a total of 52 missions in the region: 41 in Sonora proper, and an additional 11 in Sinaloa.

Name	Mission	Image	Location	Date founded	Order	Notes	Source	
Mission Nuestra Señora de la Asunción de Arizpe	Arizpe		Arizpe 30.33732, -110.16552	1648	Jesuits			
Mission San Miguel Bacoachi	Arizpe		Bacoachi	1648	Jesuits			
Mission San José de Chinapa	Arizpe		Chinapa	1648	Jesuits	Briefly an independent mission.		
Vesuachi	Chinapa				Jesuits			
Mission San Miguel de Ures	Ures		Ures 29.42926, -110.39001	1644	Jesuits			
Mission San Ignacio de Soniquipa	Ures			1646	Jesuits	Initially founded as a visita of Banámichi. Also spelled "Sinoquipe", and other variants.		
Mission Nuestra Señora de los Remedios de Beramitzi	Banamichi		30.00765, -110.21768	1639	Jesuits	Later an independent mission. Also spelled Banámichi or Banamitzi.		
Mission San Lorenzo de Güepaca	Huépac			1644	Jesuits	Later a visita.		
Mission San Pablo del Pescadero	Huépac				Jesuits			
Mission Nuestra Señora del Populo del Seri	Hermosillo			1679	Jesuits			
Mission Nuestra Señora del Rosario de Nacameri	Rayón				1638	Jesuits	At other times variously a visita of Ures, Pópulo, and Opodepe.	
Mission Nuestra Señora de Los Angeles	Hermosillo				Jesuits			
Mission San Pedro de la Conquista de los Seris	Hermosillo			1742	Jesuits			
Mission Nuestra Señora de la Concepción de Baviácora	Baviácora		Baviácora	1639	Jesuits	Later a visita.		
Mission San Pedro Aconchi	Baviácora		Aconchi	1639	Jesuits	Later became an independent mission.		
Mission San Francisco de Borja de Tecoripa	Tecorípa		Tecorípa		Jesuits			
Mission San Ignacio de Suaqui	Tecorípa		Suaqui Grande	1620	Jesuits			
Mission San Francisco Xavier de Cumuripa	Tecorípa				Jesuits	Also spelled "Comusipa". Later became an independent mission.		
Inchoada de Hecatari	Tecorípa				Jesuits			
Mission San Ignacio de Loyola de Ónavas	Ónavas		Ónavas	1622	Jesuits			
Mission San Joseph de Soyopa	Ónavas		Soyopa		Jesuits	Also known as San Francisco de Soyopa.		
Mission San José de Mátape	Mátape			1629	Jesuits			
Mission Santa Cruz de Nacori	Mátape			1629	Jesuits	Often called "Nacori Grande".		
Mission Assumpción de Nuestra Señora de los Alamos	Mátape		Álamos	1630	Jesuits			
Mission San Francisco Xavier de Rebeico	Mátape			1673	Jesuits	Also spelled Robesco.		
Mission San Javier de Arivechi	Arivechi		Arivechi	1627	Jesuits			
Mission San Ignacio Bacanora	Arivechi		Bacanora			1627	Jesuits	At another time a visita of Sahuaripa.
Pondia	Arivechi			1627	Jesuits			
Mission Santa Rosalia de Onapa	Onapa				Jesuits	Initially a visita of Arivechi.		
Mission Los Siete Angeles de Taraichi	Onapa				Jesuits			
Mission San Ildefonso de Ostimuri	Onapa				Jesuits			
Valle de Tacupeto	Onapa				Jesuits			
Mission San Jose de Teopari	Teopari				Jesuits			
Mission Santa Maria de los Dolores	Teopari				Jesuits			
Nátori	Teopari				Jesuits			
Mission Santa Ana de Mobas	Mobas			1622	Jesuits			
Mission San Joaquín de Nuri	Mobas			1622	Jesuits			
Mission Nuestra Señora de los Angeles de Sahuaripa	Sahuaripa			1641	Jesuits			
Mission San Mateo Malzura	Sahuaripa			1677	Jesuits			
Santo Tomás	Sahuaripa				Jesuits			
Mission San Idelfonso de Yécora	Yécora			1673	Jesuits	Initially a visita of Onapa.		
Santa Ana	Yécora				Jesuits			
Mission San Francisco Xavier de Maycoba	Yécora			1676	Jesuits			
Mission San Francisco de Huásaca	Huásabas			1645	Jesuits			
Mission San Ignacio de Oputo	Huásabas			1644	Jesuits			
Mission San Luis Gonzága de Bacadéhuachi	Nácori Chico		29.8077, -109.14075	1645	Jesuits	Later an independent mission.		
Mission Nuestra Señora de Nácori Chico	Nácori Chico			1665	Jesuits			
Mission Santo Tomás de Serva	Nácori Chico			1645	Jesuits			
Mission San Ignacio de Mochapa	Bacadéhuachi				Jesuits			
Sátachi	Bacadéhuachi				Jesuits	Possibly earlier a visita of Nacori Chico.		
Mission Santa María de Bacerac	Bacerac			1645	Jesuits			
Mission San Miguel de Bavispe	Bacerac			1645	Jesuits			
Mission Juan Evangelista de Huachinera	Bacerac			1645	Jesuits	Also spelled Guachintra. Later an independent mission.		
Mission Santa Gertrudis de Techicadéguachi	Huachinera			1688	Jesuits			
Mission San Miguel Arcángel de Oposura	Oposura			1738	Jesuits			
Mission Nuestra Señora de la Asunción de Cumpas	Oposura			1643	Jesuits	Later a visita of Huásabas.		
Térapa	Oposura				Jesuits			
Mission (Nuestro Padre) San Ignacio de Cuquiarachi	Cuquiarachi		30.87454, -109.67032	1653	Jesuits			
Mission San Francisco Xavier de Cuchuta	Cuquiarachi				Jesuits			
Mission Nuestra Señora de Guadalupe de Teuricachi	Cuquiarachi			1653	Jesuits			
Mission Santa Rosa de Tebadéguachi	Cuquiarachi			1653	Jesuits			
Mission Santa Maria de Tepupa	Batuc			1629	Jesuits	Flooded by Lake Novillo in 1964.		
Mission San Francisco Javier de Batuc	Batuc				Jesuits	Flooded by Lake Novillo in 1964.		
Mission San Joaquín y Santa Ana de Tepachi	Batuc				Jesuits	Later a visita of Oposura.		
Mission San Pedro y San Pablo del Tubutama	Tubutama		30.88497, -111.46544	1691	Jesuits			
Mission Santa Teresa de Atil	Tubutama	The mission at Atil through the ages with old and new side-by-side.	30.84437, -111.58387	1687	Jesuits	Later an independent mission.		
Mission San Antonio (Paduano) de(l) Oquitoa	Tubutama		30.74371, -111.73494	1689	Jesuits	Later a visita of Atil.		
Mission La Purísima Concepción de Nuestra Señora de Caborca	Caborca		30.69748, -112.14703	1693	Jesuits			
Mission Jesus Maria de Busani	Caborca				Jesuits			
Mission Los Cinco Señores del Busani	Caborca				Jesuits			
Mission San Valentin del Bizani	Caborca			1694	Jesuits	Established as Visita de San Juan de Bisaning (Bisanig). Elevated to the status of mission on Valentine's Day in 1694. The church ruins date to 1706.		
Mission San José de Imuris	San Ignacio		30.77742, -110.86257	1687	Jesuits	Later an independent mission.		
Mission Nuestro Padre de San Ignacio de Cabórica	San Ignacio		30.69696, -110.92431	1687	Jesuits	Also known as San Ignacio de los Pimas.		
Mission Los Santos Reyes de Cucurpe	Cucurpe		30.3318, -110.70439	1647	Jesuits	Founded by Marcos del Río. In ruins.		
Mission San Juan Bautista de Saracachi	Cucurpe				Jesuits			
Mission San Miguel Tuape	Cucurpe			1647	Jesuits			
Mission Nuestra Señora de la Ascención de Opodepe	Cucurpe			1704	Jesuits	Later an independent mission.		
Mission Nuestra Señora de los Dolores (de Cósari)	Dolores			1687	Jesuits	First mission founded in the Pimería Alta by Father Kino. It had a visita called San José at Aquimuri. Abandoned in 1744.		
Mission Nuestra Señora de los Remedios de Doagibubig	Dolores			1687	Jesuits	Abandoned in 1740. Nonextant.		
Mission Nuestra Señora del Pilar y Santiago de Cocóspera	Dolores		30.92866, -110.61148	1689	Jesuits			
Mission Santa María Suamca	Cocóspera			1693	Jesuits	Founded as Santa María del Pilar. The location changed and it became known as Santa María Suamca (spellings vary) or Santa María Bugota. Sometimes an independent mission, sometimes a visita of Cocóspera. It had visitas at San Lázaro and San Luis Bacoancos.		
Mission San Lázaro	Suamca			1691	Jesuits	Abandoned after an Apache raid.		
Mission Santa Gertrudis del Sáric	Sáric			1690	Jesuits			
Mission San Ambrosio del Búsanic y Tucubavia	Sáric			1690	Jesuits			
Mission San Bernardo de Aquimuri	Sáric			1700	Jesuits			
Mission Los Santos Ángeles de Guevavi	Guevavi		31.41007, -110.90198	1691	Jesuits	First church built in what is now southern Arizona. Abandoned in 1775. The church ruins date to 1751.		
Mission San Luis Bacoancos	Guevavi			1691	Jesuits	Abandoned after an Apache raid.		
Mission San Ignacio de Sonoitac	Guevavi			1692	Jesuits	Also named Los Reyes de Sonoita and Los Reyes del Sonoydag. A ranchería near Patagonia.		
Mission San Cayetano del Tumacácori	Guevavi			1691	Jesuits	The mission abandoned during the 1751 O'odham Uprising and rebuilt as Mission San José de Tumacácori to the west of the Santa Cruz River.		
Mission San José de Tumacácori	Guevavi		31.56861, -111.0509	1757	Jesuits	Located west of the site of Mission San Cayetano del Tumacácori. Abandoned in 1828. The farming land around the mission was sold at auction in 1834. Nonextant.		
Mission San Cayetano de Calabazas	Guevavi		31.45252, -110.95945	1755	Jesuits	Abandoned in 1786.		
Mission Santa Rosa de Bácum	Bácum			1617	Jesuits			
Mission Espíritu Santu Cócorit	Bácum			1617	Jesuits			
Mission Nuestra Señora de Belem	Huiribis				Jesuits	Later an independent mission.		
Mission Santa Bárbara de Huiribis	Huiribis				Jesuits	Later a visita.		
Natividad Navojoa	Navojoa			1614	Jesuits			
Mission San Ignacio Cohurimbo	Navojoa			1614	Jesuits	Also spelled Curimpo.		
Mission Santa Catarina de Camoa	Navojoa			1614	Jesuits	Later an independent mission.		
Mission San Fernando de las Amarillas del Carrizal				1773	Jesuits			
Mission San Andrés Conicari	Conicari			1614	Jesuits			
Mission Espíritu Santo Etchojoa				1614	Jesuits			
Mission San José de Laguna de Guaymas				1701	Jesuits			
Mission Santa Cruz del Río Mayo	Mayo			1614	Jesuits			
Mission San Estanislao del Ootcam				1699	Jesuits	Originally called Gubo Verde. Location now lost.		
Trinidad Pótam	Rahum			1617	Jesuits			
Mission Nuestra Señora de la Asunción de Rahum	Rahum			1617	Jesuits			
Texas					Jesuits			
Mission San Ignacio de Torin	Tórim			1617	Jesuits			
Trinidad Vícam	Tórim				Jesuits			
Mission San Xavier del Bac			32.10722, -111.00797	1692	Jesuits	1692–1770, 1783–1837, 1859–present. The extant mission church was completed in 1797.		
Mission Nuestra Señora de Loreto y San Marcelo de Sonoyta				1693	Jesuits			
Mission San Cosme y Damián de Tucsón			32.21346, -110.98703	1768	Franciscans	Abandoned in 1828. Nonextant.		
Mission Puerto de Purísima Concepción			32.73052, -114.61557	1780	Franciscans	Located in California but administered as part of the Pimería Alta missions. Destroyed during a Quechan raid from July 17–19, 1781. Nonextant. A reconstruction of the mission was completed in 1923, which currently serves as a parish church.		
Mission San Pedro y San Pablo de Bicuñer			32.81636, -114.51511	1781	Franciscans	Located in California but administered as part of the Pimería Alta missions. Destroyed during a Quechan raid from July 17–19, 1781. Nonextant.		
Mission Santa María Magdalena de Buquivaba	Mission Nuestro Padre de San Ignacio de Cabórica			1699	Jesuits			

== See also ==
On Spanish Missions in neighboring regions:

- Spanish missions in Arizona (including northern Arizona)
- Spanish missions in Baja California
- Spanish missions in California
- Spanish missions in Chihuahua and Coahuila
- Spanish missions in New Mexico

On general missionary history:

- Catholic Church and the Age of Discovery
- List of the oldest churches in Mexico

On colonial Spanish American history:

- Spanish colonization of the Americas
- California mission clash of cultures
