= Mission Santa María Suamca =

Spanish mission in the Sonoran desert

Santa María Suamca (also Santa María del Pilar, Santa María de los Pimas, Santa María Búgota, Santa Cruz) was a Spanish mission in the Sonoran desert.

== History ==
Jesuit missionary Eusebio Kino founded Suamca in 1706 as a visita of Mission Nuestra Señora de los Dolores. It became an independent mission with the 1732 arrival of Ignacio Xavier Keller At times, Mission San Lázaro and Mission San Luis Bacoancos were administered as visitas of Suamca.

The missionaries abandoned Suamca in favor of Mission Nuestra Señora del Pilar y Santiago de Cocóspera, after an Apache raid on November 19, 1768 destroyed most of the buildings. In 1787, Presidio Santa Cruz de Terrenate was relocated to Suamca, which was subsequently repopulated and called Santa Cruz after the presidio.

== Missionaries ==
Missionaries stationed at Santa María Suamca included:

- Ignacio Xavier Keller (1732–1759)
- José Torres Perea (1741–1743)
- Joaquín Félix Díaz (1733; 1760)
- José Garrucho (1744–1748)
- Miguel de la Vega (1749–1751)
- Juan Nentvig (1753)
- Francisco Hlava (1756)
- Juan Labora (1757)
- Diego Barrera (1760–1767)
- Francisco Roche (1768)
