= Mission San Ambrosio del Búsanic y Tucubavia =

Spanish mission in the Sonoran desert

San Ambrosio del Búsanic y Tucubavia was a Spanish mission in the Sonoran desert.

== History ==
Búsanic was founded around 1690. Jesuit missionary Eusebio Kino visited in 1790 and in 1796.

Ciprián, the son of Luis Oacpicagigua, raided Búsanic in 1759.

By the 1760s, Búsanic was a visita of Mission Santa Gertrudis del Sáric. It was abandoned by 1766 due to ongoing Apache raids, although the Franciscan missionary Juan Agorreta was nominally stationed there in 1768.
