= Mission San Bernardo de Aquimuri =

Spanish mission in the Sonoran Desert

San Bernardo de Aquimuri was a Spanish mission in the Sonoran Desert. It was a visita of Mission Santa Gertrudis del Sáric.

== History ==
Jesuit missionary Eusebio Kino founded a ranch at Aquimuri around 1701, and local converts built a church by 1706.

The settlement was destroyed in an Apache raid on July 27, 1771. Today, the location is in use as a cemetery.
