= Mission San Estanislao del Ootcam =

Spanish mission in the Sonoran desert

San Estanislao del Ootcam was a Spanish mission in the Sonoran desert, founded at a site originally called Gubo Verde. Its location is now lost.

== History ==
Jesuit missionary Eusebio Kino founded the Ootcam mission in 1699. He revisited it on November 8, 1701; on February 11, 1702; and on November 11, 1706.
