= Mission San Luis Bacoancos =

Spanish mission in the Sonoran desert

San Luis Bacoancos, also called San Luis de Babi, was a Spanish mission in the Sonoran desert.

== History ==
Jesuit missionary Eusebio Kino established the site in January 1697. It was designated as a visita of Mission Los Santos Ángeles de Guevavi in 1701, under the authority of the missionary priest Juan San Martin. A church was built sometime before 1706.

In 1745, the missions of San Luis Bacoancos and San Lázaro had a combined population of 800 Pimas. The mission was deserted in 1763.
