= Mission San Lázaro =

Spanish Mission in the Sonoran desert

San Lázaro was a Spanish mission in the Sonoran desert.

Located in the Santa Cruz River valley, the European settlement was founded as a cattle ranch by José Romo de Vivar. The mission was founded by Jesuit missionary Eusebio Kino about 1695, and was at various times a visita of Mission Nuestra Señora del Pilar y Santiago de Cocóspera, Mission Santa María Suamca, or Mission Nuestra Señora de los Dolores.

Kino oversaw the building of a mission church in 1706. John Ross Browne sketched the mission in 1864. By the late 1860s, it was deserted due to Apache raids.
