= Capo di Vado Lighthouse =

Lighthouse in Liguria, Italy

Capo di Vado
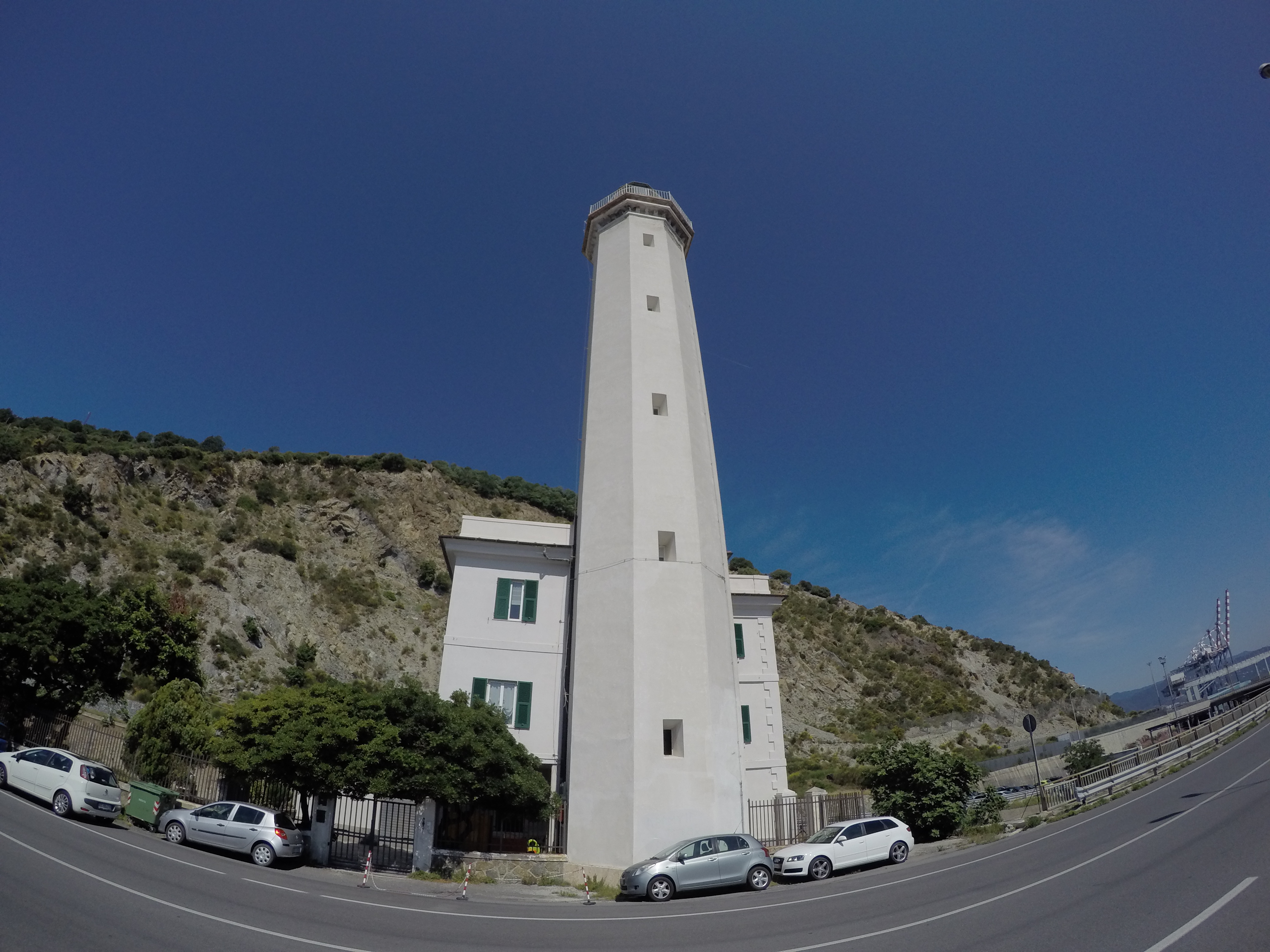
- Capo di Vado Lighthouse
- Location: Vado Ligure, Liguria, Italy
- Coordinates: 44°15′29″N 8°27′09″E

Tower
- Constructed: 1883
- Foundation: concrete base
- Construction: masonry tower
- Automated: yes
- Height: 34 metres (112 ft)
- Shape: octagonal prism tower with balcony and lantern
- Markings: white tower, grey metallic lantern dome
- Power source: mains electricity
- Operator: Marina Militare
- Heritage: Italian national heritage

Light
- Focal height: 43 metres (141 ft)
- Lens: Type OF
- Intensity: main: MAXLED 800 EFF reserve: MLED-155
- Range: main: 14 nautical miles (26 km; 16 mi) reserve: 7 nautical miles (13 km; 8.1 mi)
- Characteristic: Fl (4) W 15s.
- Italy no.: 1514 E.F.

Capo di Vado Lighthouse (Italian: Faro di Capo di Vado) is an active lighthouse located on the prominent Capo di Vado, 1.5 kilometres (0.93 mi) south of Vado Ligure, Liguria on the Ligurian Sea.

== Description ==
The lighthouse was built in 1883 and consists of a white masonry octagonal prism tower, 34 feet (10 m) high, with balcony and lantern attached to the seaward side of a 3-storey white keeper's house The lantern is painted in white, the dome in grey metallic, and is positioned at 43 metres (141 ft) above sea level and emits four white flashes in a 15 seconds period visible up to a distance of 14 nautical miles (26 km; 16 mi). The lighthouse is completely automated and operated by the Marina Militare with the identification code number 1514 E.F.

== See also ==
- List of lighthouses in Italy
- Vado Ligure
