= Plutarco Elías Calles Dam =

Presa Plutarco Elías Calles Plutarco Elías Calles Dam
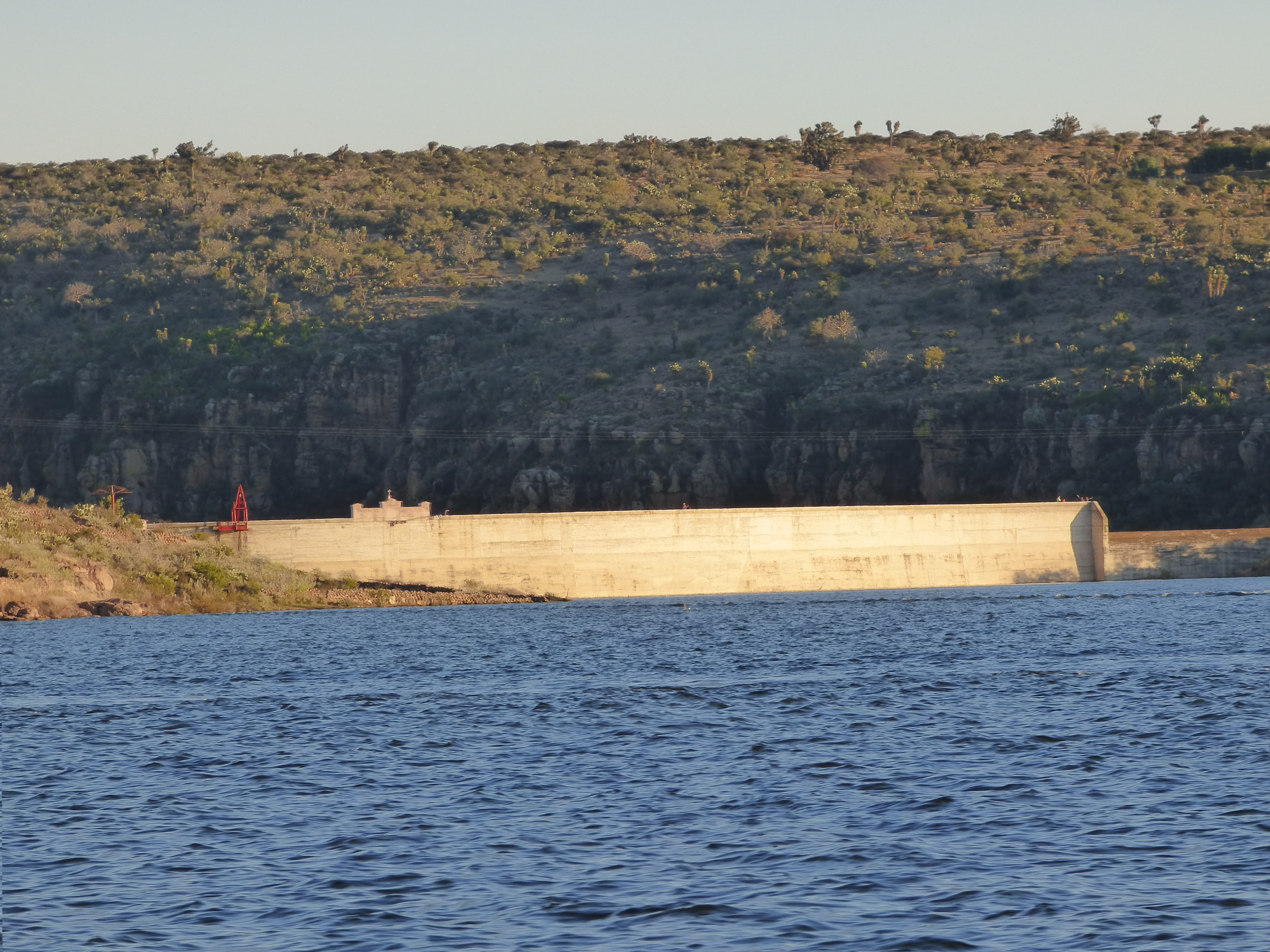
- View of Calles Dam
- Interactive map of Presa Plutarco Elías Calles; Plutarco Elías Calles Dam
- Official name: Presa Presidente Plutarco Elías Calles
- Location: San José de Gracia, Aguascalientes, Mexico
- Coordinates: 22°8′29″N 102°25′2″W
- Construction began: 1927
- Opening date: 1928
- Owner: Government of Aguascalientes

Dam and spillways
- Type of dam: Hydroelectric
- Height: 66 m (217 ft)
- Length: 268 m (879 ft)

Reservoir
- Total capacity: 340,000,000 m^{3} (1.2×10^{10} cu ft)
- Website; Presa Plutarco Elías Calles

The Presidente Plutarco Elías Calles Dam or Plutarco Elías Calles Dam, is a dam located in the municipality of San José de Gracia (Aguascalientes), Mexico, 14 km (8.7 mi) west of the Pan-American Highway (Federal #45) in the north of the state on the edge of the Sierra Fría.

Its storage capacity is 340 million cubic metres (12×10^{9} cu ft). It is made of reinforced concrete, and is 66 m (217 ft) high by 268 m (879 ft)long. Its use is mainly agricultural, with 2,000 users over 4,000 ha.

== History ==
Its spillway was built between 1927 and 1928 by the American company JG White.

It was the first irrigation project of the Mexican Revolution regime. It dates back to the end of the 19th century, formulated by the engineer Blas Romo, named Santiago Dam Project. The project remained dormant until November 1925. On a visit to the state of Aguascalientes by then President Plutarco Elías Calles, the dam project was presented to him. It was then approved.

The project was then titled Irrigation System No. 1.

An image of the El Cristo Roto Monument was placed inside the dam on an island (former Mountain). Another dam with the same name sits in the state of Sonora, also known as El Novillo. It was built long after the Aguascalientes dam.

== Gallery ==
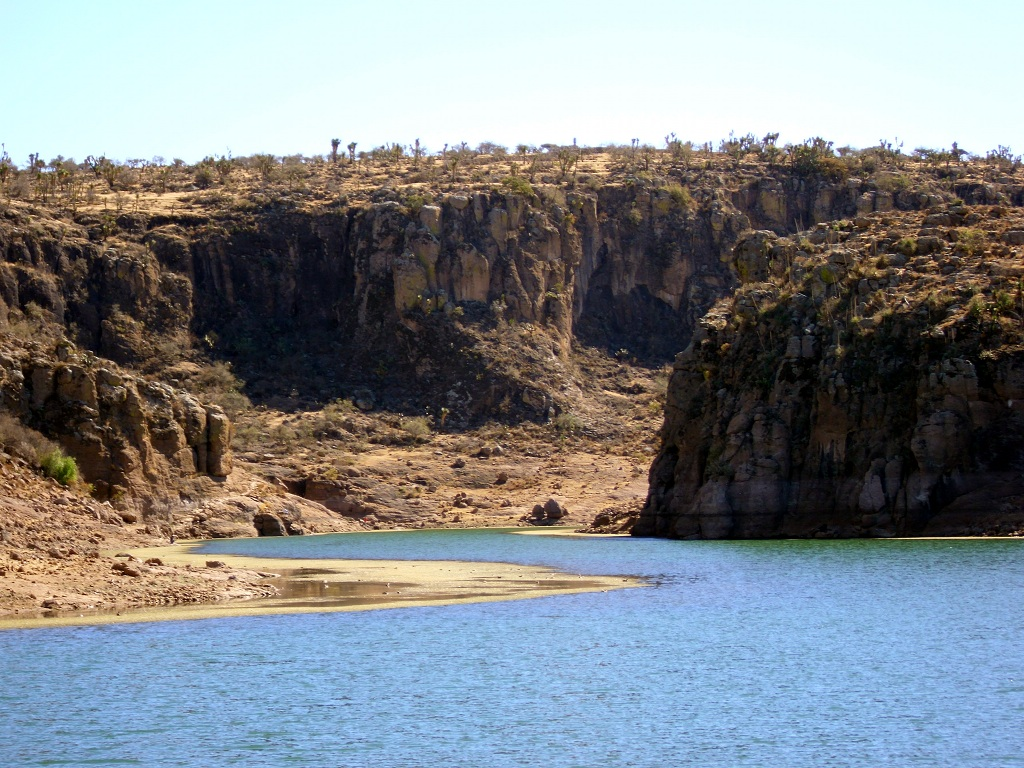
Canyon Cañadas

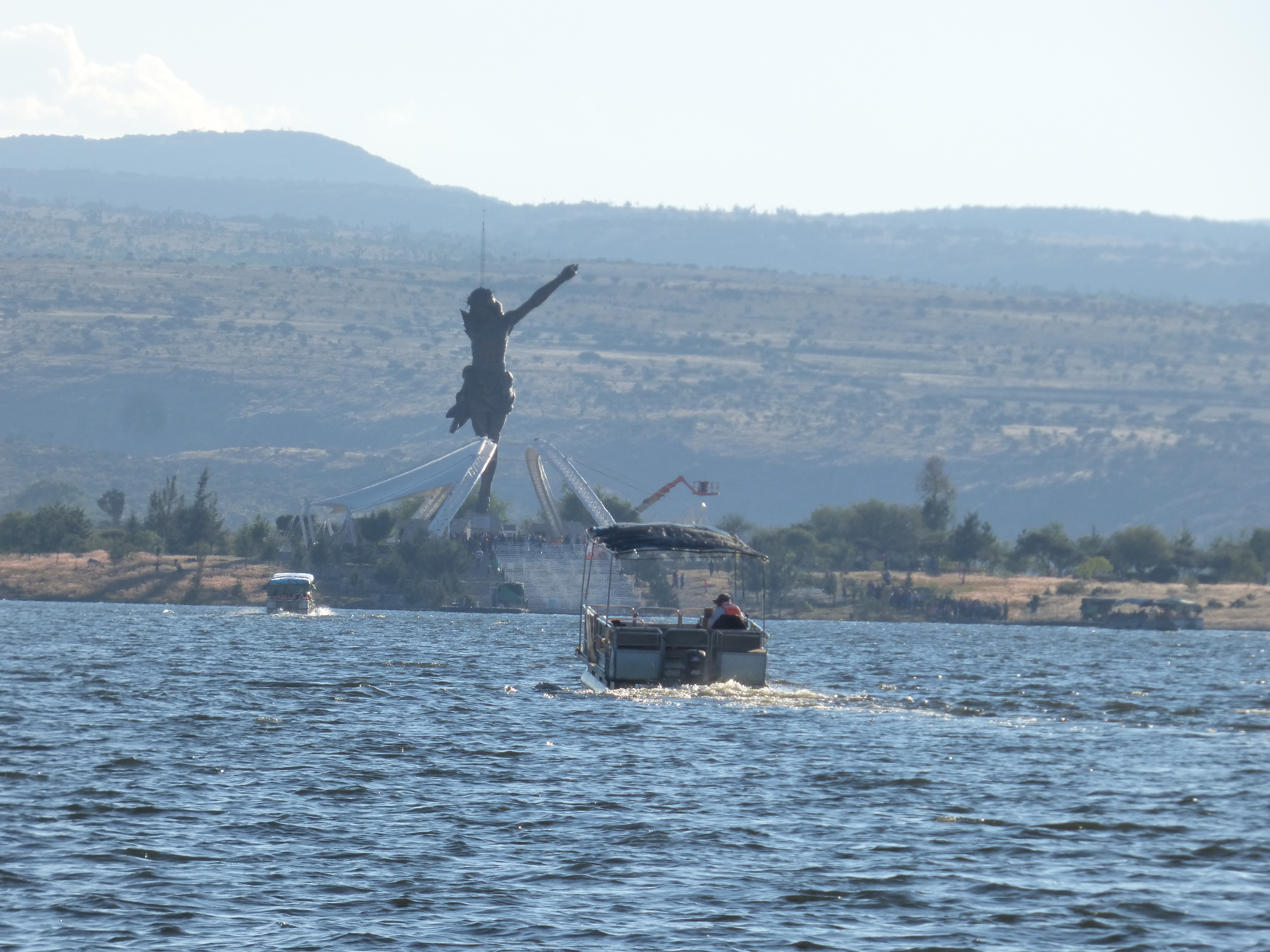
Motorized launch approaching the Sanctuary of Cristo Roto

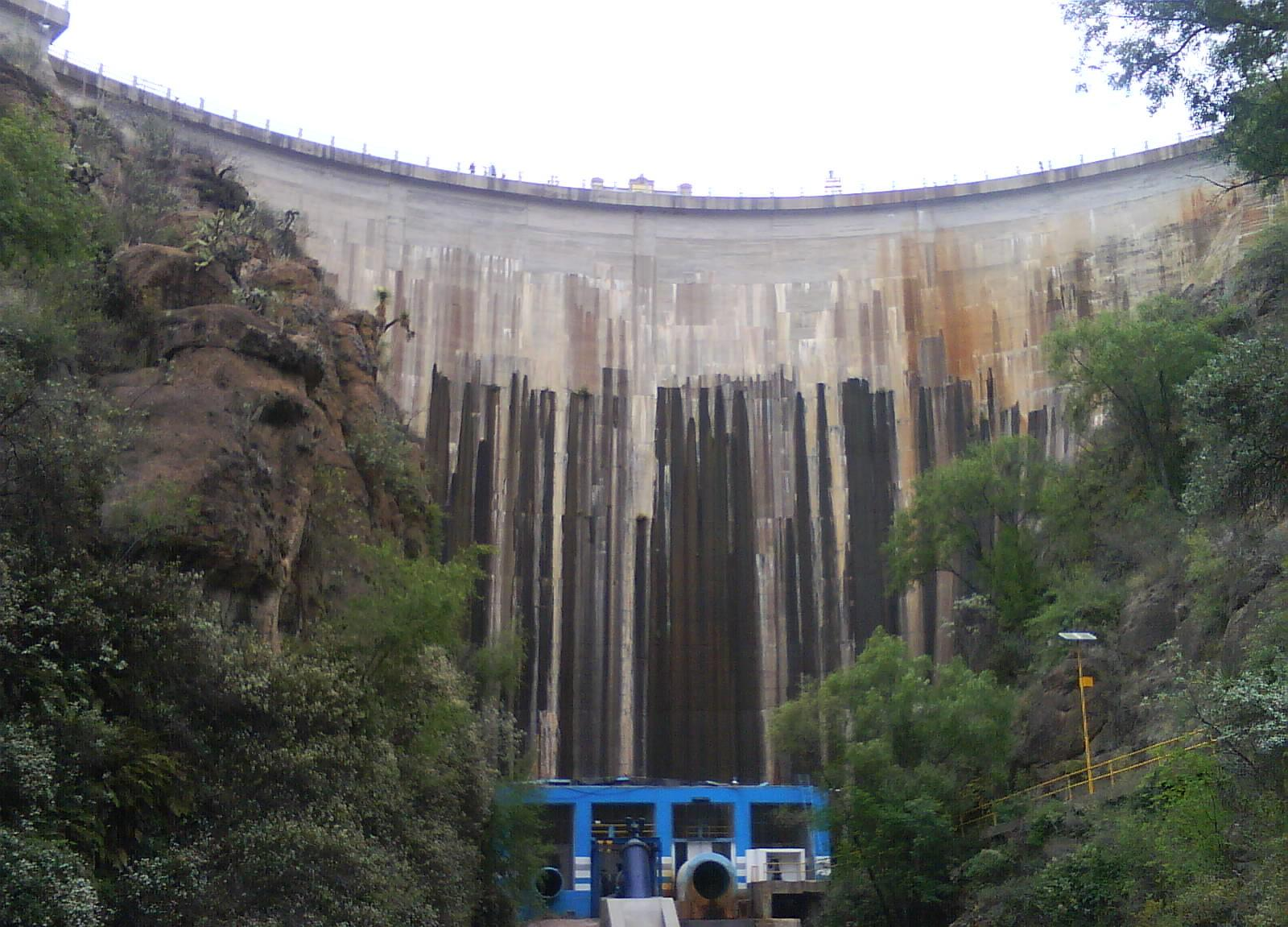
Grout Curtain
