= Juan Nentvig =

German anthropologist

Juan Bautista Nentvig (also spelled Nentuig) was a priest born in Glatz, Germany (now Klodzko, Poland) on March 28, 1713. He was active in the Pimaria Alta (now partially in Sonora, Mexico and the state of Arizona) where he worked with the various Piman Tribes, including the Upper Pima and Opata. He began there in 1752. He documented their life and customs extensively, although some of his writings of the medicinal values of native plants appear to be somewhat exaggerated.

Nentvig was active at such noted sites as San Xavier del Bac, and through his writings made known what became of a number of the area missions, asistencias (sub-missions or contributing chapels), and visitas (visiting chapels or country chapels) founded by missionary Eusebio Kino.

Nentvig died at Ixtlán on September 11, 1768. He was buried within a few days of his death in Jala, a municipality of Santa Maria del Oro, county of Ahuacatlán, state of Nayarit. The location of his grave has been lost.
