= Sáric =

Sáric O'odham: Ṣaʼalk
- Town and Municipality
- Location in Mexico Sáric (Mexico)
- Coordinates: 31°06′11″N 111°22′40″W
- Country: Mexico
- State: Sonora
- Municipality: Sáric

Population (2010)
  - Total: 892
- Time zone: UTC–07:00 (Zona Pacífico)
- Area code: +52 637

Sáric (O'odham: Ṣaʼalk mountain pass) is a small town in Sáric Municipality, located in the extreme north of the Mexican state of Sonora. In 2010, it had a population of 892.

== History ==
The town was founded in 1690 by Jesuit missionary Eusebio Kino as Mission Santa Gertrudis del Sáric. It served as the local mission headquarters, with visitas at Búsanic, Aquimuri, and San Antonio de la Arizona. Missionaries stationed there included:

- Pedro de Sandoval (1690)
- Juan Nentuig (1750–1751)
- Miguel Gerstner (1756; 1762–1767)
- Bernard Middendorff (1756)
- Juan José Agorreta (1768–1776)
- Antonio Ramos (1776–1783)
- Florencio Ibáñez (1783–1798)
- Ramón López (1795)
- Andrés Sánchez (1796)
- Bartolomé Socies (1798–1815)
- Matías Creo (1815–1828)
