= Mission Santa Teresa de Ádid =

Spanish mission in the Sonoran Desert

Santa Teresa de Ádid, sometimes mistakenly called Santa Teresa de Átil, is a historic Spanish mission located near the small town of Atil, Sonora. It was a visita of Mission San Pedro y San Pablo del Tubutama.

== History ==
Jesuit missionary Eusebio Kino founded a ranch at Santa Teresa in 1701. The first priest assigned to the mission was Gerónimo Minutuli, another Jesuit.

On February 3, 1768, King Carlos III ordered the Jesuits forcibly expelled from New Spain and returned to the home country. That year, the Franciscans arrived to take over the mission.

== See also ==
- Mission San José de Tumacacori
- San Cayetano de Tumacácori Mission
- Mission San Xavier del Bac
- Spanish Missions in the Sonoran Desert
- List of Jesuit sites
