= Visitas =

Sub-missions of Catholic missions during the 16th–19th centuries

Visitas or asistencias were smaller sub-missions of Catholic missions established during the 16th-19th centuries of the Spanish colonization of the Americas and the Philippines. They allowed the Catholic church and the Spanish crown to extend their reach into native populations at a modest cost.

== Description ==
Visitas served missions and were much smaller than the main missions with living quarters, workshops and crops in addition to a church. They were typically staffed with a small group of clergymen and a relatively small group of indigenous neophytes in order to maintain the complex.

Particularly strategic visitas were later elevated to the status of a full mission. This typically included an expansion of existing facilities to support a larger clergy and indigenous neophyte population, improvement of basic infrastructure such as roads, and rechristening under a new Catholic saint.

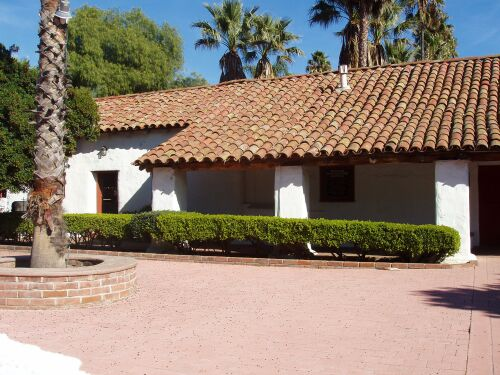
San Antonio de Pala, an asistencia of Mission San Luis Rey de Francia, is located in Pala, California

In Spanish Florida, visitas were mission stations without a resident missionary. Church buildings at visitas were simple, or sometimes absent. Visitas were often in satellite villages associated with a town with a doctrina (a mission with one or more resident missionaries).

== History ==
The first visita that was founded and documented seems to be a visita established in the village of Soloy (in modern day Florida). Pedro Menéndez de Avilés designated it to become a blockhouse in 1567, but it became a visita to Mission Nombre de Dios in the beginning of the 1600s.

More visitas were established in Spanish Florida during the early 1600s, but the only ones that seem to have been documented were four visitas to Mission San Pedro de Mocama and nine visitas to Mission San Juan del Puerto.

During the early 1600s, visitas were founded in present day New Mexico and Sonora. Almost a century and a half later, the third and final visita in New Mexico was established, Nuestra Señora de Guadalupe de Pojoaque.

The last visita to be founded in Sonora was San Valentin de Bisanig (later renamed San Juan Bisaning) in 1706. Missions stopped being founded after 1772, when Father Juan Crisóstomo Gil de Bernabé founded the mission Carrizal (also known as Carrizel) and was martyred the year later, on March (6, 8, or 9). Father Antonio Caxa designated March 8, 1774 as the day to honor Bernabé.

Starting in 1684 with the founding of Mission San Bruno in Baja California Sur by Spanish admiral Isidro de Atondo y Antillón and Father Eusebio Kino, missions started to be founded in Baja California and Baja California Sur, along with visitas.

The first visita founded there was San Juan Bautista Londó in 1699, which served Mission Nuestra Señora de Loreto Conchó. The final visita in Baja California and Baja California Sur was established in 1798 as San Telmo, which served Mission Santo Domingo de la Frontera.

In 1687, Father Eusebio Kino started to establish missions in Pimería Alta, as well as visitas. In what is modern day Arizona, he established visitas at Huachuca, Quiburi, and Santa Cruz, as well as one called San Ignacio de Sonoitac. Sonoitac was originally just a ranchería which was said to have a bigger population than the Guevavi, Tumacácori, and Calabazas settlements. A church was built, it became a visita, and it was named San Ignacio de Sonoitac after or around 1737.

In 1692, San Agustín del Tucson was established by Kino as a visita to Mission San Xavier del Bac, but became a mission in 1768 as Mission San Cosme y Damián de Tucsón.

In 1749 and 1750, along the Lower Rio Grande Valley, there was a large colonization effort, mainly led by José de Escandón. The towns of Reynosa, Camargo, Mier, and Guerrero were established in present-day Mexico, along with missions. However, the visitas that were built to serve those missions were established in present-day Texas, technically making them the only visitas established within its current boundaries.

The mission system in California started with the founding of Mission San Diego de Alcala in 1769 by Father Junipero Serra. The first asistencia in California, Santa Paula, was founded around 1782 to Mission San Buenaventura. More asistencias were established to 6 out of the 21 missions in California.

== America ==
The following are lists of visitas in America, sorted by year of establishment.

=== California ===
Spanish asistencias in California
| Name | Image | Location | Established | Notes | References |
|---|---|---|---|---|---|
| Santa Paula | | 34.35584, -119.05086 | 1782 or after | It served Mission San Buenaventura. | |
| Nuestra Señora Reina de los Ángeles | | 34.05702, -118.2392 | 1784 | It served Mission San Gabriel Arcángel. | |
| San Pedro y San Pablo | | 37.58714, -122.49391 | 1786 | It served Mission San Francisco de Asís. | |
| Santa Margarita de Cortona | | 35.40197, -120.6122 | 1787 | It served Mission San Luis Obispo de Tolosa. | |
| Santa Gertrudis | | 34.34752, -119.29704 | Between 1792 and 1809 | It served Mission San Buenaventura. | |
| San Antonio de Pala | | 33.36591, -117.07419 | June 13, 1816 | It served Mission San Luis Rey de Francia. | |
| San Rafael Arcángel | | 37.97427, -122.52798 | 1817 | It originally served Mission San Francisco de Asís, and later became a mission in 1822. | |
| Santa Ysabel | | 33.13057, -116.67786 | 1818 | It served Mission San Diego de Alcalá. | |
| Las Flores | | 33.299722, -117.460833 | 1823 | It served Mission San Luis Rey de Francia. | |

=== Arizona ===
Spanish visitas in Arizona
| Name | Image | Location | Established | Notes | References |
|---|---|---|---|---|---|
| Walpi | | Below First Mesa | Around 1629 | It served Mission San Francisco de Oraibi. The visita name is unknown. | |
| San Buenaventura de Mishóngnovi | | Below Second Mesa | Around 1629 | It served Mission San Bartolomé de Shungópove. | |
| San Cayetano del Tumacácori | | On the east side of the Santa Cruz River | January 1691 | It served Mission Los Santos Ángeles de Guevavi during all of its years as San Cayetano, and a few years as San José. | |
| Los Santos Ángeles de Guevavi | | 31.41007, -110.90198 | 1691 | It was originally founded as a mission in 1691, but became a visita of San José de Tumacacori around 1773. | |
| San Ignacio de Sonoitac | | Near Patagonia | 1692 | It served Mission Los Santos Ángeles de Guevavi. | |
| San Agustín del Tucson | | 32.21346, -110.98703 | 1692 | It served Mission San Xavier del Bac. In 1768, it was elevated to the status of mission and became the Mission San Cosme y Damián de Tucsón. | |
| San Martín de Aribac | | Arivaca | 1695 | Also known as Santa Gertrudes de Arivaca, it served Mission Los Santos Ángeles de Guevavi. Described as being 10 leagues (26 miles) away from Guevavi, which is only a couple miles off from the current measurement of 27.8 miles. | |
| San Joaquín de Basosucan | | Babacomari Ranch | 1696-1697 | Also known as San Joaquín de Huachuca. | |
| Santa Cruz de Gaybanipitea | | Along the San Pedro River | Around 1731 | It served Mission Santa María Suamca. Also known as Santa Cruz de Jauanipicta, it, along with Quiburi, was founded along the San Pedro River. | |
| Santa Ana de Quiburi | | Along the San Pedro River | Around 1731 | It served Mission Santa María Suamca. | |
| San Cayetano de Calabazas | | 31.45252, -110.95945 | 1756 | It served Mission Los Santos Ángeles de Guevavi (and later was an estancia of Mission San José de Tumacácori). It later had a resident priest, meaning it became a mission. It was downgraded back to a visita of Mission Los Santos Ángeles de Guevavi in 1784 and abandoned in 1786. | |
| Santa Gertrudis de Tubac | | | By 1763 | It served Mission Los Santos Ángeles de Guevavi. | |

=== New Mexico ===
Spanish visitas in New Mexico
| Name | Image | Location | Established | Notes | References |
|---|---|---|---|---|---|
| San Buenaventura de Cochití | | _{35.608056; -106.345833} | Early 1600s | It served Mission Santo Domingo, but later became a mission. | |
| San Buenaventura de Humanas | | _{34.25962, -106.09231} | 1626 | It served Mission San Gregorio de Abó, and by 1629 became an actual mission. | |
| San Luis Obispo de Sevilleta | | | 1627 | It was originally a mission, but was later downgraded to a visita of Nuestra Señora de Perpetuo Socorro. Abandoned in 1680. | |
| Santa Clara | | _{35.96783, -106.08796} | 1628 | It first served Mission San Juan Bautista de los Caballeros. It was destroyed during the Pueblo Revolt and then rebuilt to serve Mission San Ildefonso. It was remodeled around 1900 with a new roof which caused it to collapse in 1905. Rebuilt again around 1914 and remodeled in the 1960s. | |
| Nuestra Señora de Guadalupe de Pojoaque | | | Around 1765 | It served San Francisco de Nambé. | |

=== Texas ===
Spanish visitas in Texas
| Name | Image | Location | Established | Notes | References |
|---|---|---|---|---|---|
| San Agustín de Laredo (Camargo) | | _{26.37135, -98.8563} | 1749 | It served Mission San Agustín de Laredo, which was located in Camargo. | |
| San Joaquin del Monte (Reynosa) | | _{26.10515, -98.26046} | 1749 | It served Mission San Joaquín del Monte, which was located in Reynosa. | |
| La Purísima Concepción (Mier) | | _{26.46043, -99.02966} | 1750 | It served Mission La Purísima Concepción, which was located in Mier. | |
| San Francisco Solano de Ampuero (Revilla) | | _{26.90166, -99.26678} | 1750 | It served Mission San Francisco Solano de Ampuero, which was located in present-day Guerrero. | |

=== Spanish Florida ===
Known Spanish visitas in Spanish Florida
| Name | Location | Established | Notes | References |
|---|---|---|---|---|
| Soloy | Florida | 1567 | Originally a blockhouse, but by the beginning of the 1600s, became a visita of Mission Nombre de Dios. It was two leagues north of the mission. | |
| San José de Zapala | _{31.51544, -81.24218} | By 1597 | It served either Mission Nuestra Señora de Guadalupe de Tolomato or Mission Santa Clara de Tupiqui. It had a convent by 1616, and it became a mission. | |
| Tocoy | Florida | By 1602 | It served Mission San Sebastián. It was around five leagues due west of St. Augustine. | |
| Santa María de la Sena | Amelia Island | 1602 | It served Mission San Pedro de Mocama. It was also called Santa Catalina de Santa María and Santa Catalina or Santa María de Guale. It later moved to St. Augustine and was called Santa Catarina de Guale. | |
| San Antonio (de Aratabo/Arapaha) | Possibly Georgia | 1602 | It served Mission San Pedro de Mocama. Later (probably around 1610), Fray Pedro Viniegra resided in the visita, meaning it later became a mission. | |
| Chica Faya la Madalena | Possibly Georgia | By 1602 | It served Mission San Pedro de Mocama. Said to be located alongside San Antonio. | |
| Veracruz | Florida | 1602 | It served Mission San Juan del Puerto. It was one-half league away from the mission. | |
| (San Francisco de) Molo/Moloa | Florida | By 1602 | It served Mission San Juan del Puerto. It was five leagues from the mission. It most likely gained a convent by 1604, and definitely had one by 1610, when Fray Pedro Bermejo was noted to be the "definitor guardian", meaning it later became a mission. | |
| Potayo | Florida | By 1602 | It served Mission San Juan del Puerto. It was four leagues from the mission. | |
| San Mateo | Florida | By 1602 | It served Mission San Juan del Puerto. It was two leagues from the mission. The region near the site had a fort which secured the entrance of the St. Johns River. | |
| San Pablo | Florida | By 1602 | It served Mission San Juan del Puerto. It was one league and a half away from the mission. | |
| Hicachirico | Florida | 1602 | It served Mission San Juan del Puerto. It was one league from the mission. | |
| Chinisca | Florida | By 1602 | It served Mission San Juan del Puerto. It was one league and a half from the mission. | |
| Carabay/Sarabay | Florida | By 1602 | It served Mission San Juan del Puerto. It was a fourth of a league from the mission. | |
| Espogache | Georgia | By 1603 | It served Mission Santo Domingo de Talaxe (also known as Santo Domingo de Asao and Santo Domingo de Talaje). It eventually became a mission center. | |
| Olatayco | Possibly Georgia | By 1604 | It served Mission San Pedro de Mocama. | |
| San Francisco de Potano | _{29.72993, -82.44179} | 1607 | In 1607, Fray Prieto visited San Francisco de Potano, starting the construction of a church. Prieto later moved to San Miguel, and left San Francisco de Potano as a visita. Prieto traveled daily from his residence to minister to the Potano. By 1616, it was the site of a convent, meaning it later became a mission. | |
| Yoa | Georgia | By 1609 | It served Mission Santa Catalina de Guale. Identified by John Tate Lanning as "two leagues up a mainland river back of the bars of Zapala [Sapelo Sound] and Cofonufo [St. Catherines Sound]". | |
| Apalo | Florida | By 1616 | It probably served Mission San Francisco de Potano. | |
| Santa Cruz de Cachipile | _{30.66337, -83.20622} | By 1655 | It served Mission San Ildefonso de Chamile. | |
| Santa Ana | Florida | By 1657 | It served Mission San Pedro y San Pablo de Potohiriba. | |
| San(ta) ? | Florida | By 1657 | It served Mission San Matheo de Tolapatafi. | |
| San(ta) ? | Florida | By 1657 | It served Mission San Matheo de Tolapatafi. | |
| San(ta) ? | Florida | By 1657 | It served Mission San Matheo de Tolapatafi. | |
| San(ta) ? | Florida | By 1657 | It served Mission San Matheo de Tolapatafi. | |
| San(ta) ? | Florida | By 1657 | It served Mission San Matheo de Tolapatafi. | |
| San(ta) ? | Florida | By 1657 | It served Mission San Matheo de Tolapatafi. | |
| San(ta) ? | Florida | By 1657 | It served Mission San Matheo de Tolapatafi. | |
| San(ta) ? | Florida | By 1657 | It served Mission San Matheo de Tolapatafi. | |
| San(ta) ? | Florida | By 1657 | It served Mission San Matheo de Tolapatafi. | |
| San Juan | Florida | By 1657 | It served Mission San Lorenzo de Ivitachuco. | |
| San Pablo | Florida | By 1657 | It served Mission San Lorenzo de Ivitachuco. | |
| San Nicolás | Florida | By 1657 | It served Mission San Lorenzo de Ivitachuco. | |
| Ayapasca | Florida | By 1657 | It served Mission San Lorenzo de Ivitachuco. | |
| | Florida | By 1657 | It served Mission La Concepción de Ayubale. It is likely that Ayubale had more than one visita. | |
| | Florida | By 1657 | It served Mission San Francisco de Oconi. | |
| | Florida | By 1657 | It served Mission San Pedro y San Pablo de Patale. | |
| | Florida | By 1657 | It served Mission San Pedro y San Pablo de Patale. | |
| | Florida | By 1657 | It served Mission Santa María de Bacuqua. | |
| San Cosme | Florida | By 1657 | It served Mission San Cosme y San Damián de Cupaica. | |
| | Florida | By 1657 | It served Mission San Cosme y San Damián de Cupaica. | |
| | Florida | By 1657 | It served Mission San Cosme y San Damián de Cupaica. | |
| San Pedro | Florida | By 1657 (?) | It served Mission San Cosme y San Damián de Cupaica. | |
| Ypaja | Florida | By 1697 (?) | It may have been a visita. | |
| Piritiriba | Florida | By 1701 | It served Mission San Juan del Puerto. It was three leagues away from the mission. | |

== Mexico ==
The following are lists of visitas in Mexico, sorted by year of establishment.

=== Baja California ===
Spanish visitas in Baja California
| Name | Image | Location | Established | Notes | Reference |
|---|---|---|---|---|---|
| Calamajué | | 30.96805, -116.09194 | 1766 | It served Misión San Francisco Borja. | |
| San Juan de Dios | | 30.18266, -115.16791 | 1769 | It served Misión San Fernando Rey de España de Velicatá. | |
| San Telmo | | 30.96805, -116.09194 | 1798 | It served Misión Santo Domingo de la Frontera. | |
| San Isidoro | | 30.76527, -115.54722 | | It served Misión San Pedro Mártir de Verona. | |
| Santa Ana | | 28.69027, -113.82055 | | It served Misión San Francisco Borja de Adac. | |

=== Baja California Sur ===
Spanish visitas in Baja California Sur
| Name | Image | Location | Established | Notes | Reference |
|---|---|---|---|---|---|
| San Juan Bautista Londó | | 26.22521, -111.47354 | 1699 | It served Misión de Nuestra Señora de Loreto Conchó. | |
| Angel de la Guarda | | 23.89111, -110.17083 | 1721 | It served Misión de Nuestra Señora del Pilar de La Paz Airapí. | |
| La Pasión | | 24.88777, -111.02871 | 1741 | It served Mission San Luis Gonzaga. | |
| La Presentación | | 25.72893, -111.54366 | 1769 | It served Misión San Francisco Javier de Viggé-Biaundó | |
| San Pablo (y/o Los Dolores de Arriba) | | 27.70184, -113.14484 | | It served Misión Nuestra Señora de los Dolores del Sur Chillá. | |
| San Jacinto | | 23.24277, -110.07722 | | It served Misión Santa Rosa de las Palmas. | |

=== Sonora ===
Spanish visitas in Sonora
| Name | Image | Location | Established | Notes | Reference |
|---|---|---|---|---|---|
| Concepción Curimpo | | | After 1614 | It served Mission Natividad Navojoa. | |
| Nuestra Señora de la Asunción de Tepahui | | | After 1614 | It served Mission San Andrés Conicari. | |
| San Ignacio de Tesia | | | Around 1614 | It served Mission Santa Catarina de Camoa. | |
| Espíritu Santo Cócorit | | | Before 1617 | Established as a mission some time before 1617. After 1617, it served Mission Santa Rosa de Bácum. | |
| Trinidad Potam | | | 1617 | It served Mission Nuestra Señora de la Asunción de Rahum. | |
| San Francisco Xavier de Cumuripa | | | 1619 | It originally served Mission San Francisco de Borja de Tecoripa. Later it became a headquarters mission with two visitas. | |
| San Francisco Buenavista | | | 1619 | It served Mission San Francisco Xavier de Cumuripa. In 1765, a presidio was built here, as well as a new church whose construction started in 1772. The visita is now underwater. | |
| San José de Pimas | | | 1620 | It originally served Mission San Francisco de Borja de Tecoripa. It became a headquarters mission in 1771. | |
| San Ignacio de Suaqui | | | 1620 | It served Mission San Francisco de Borja de Tecoripa. | |
| San Joaquin y Santa Ana de Nuri | | | 1622 | It served Mission Santa Maria de Movas. | |
| San Ignacio Bacanora | | | 1627 | It originally served Mission San Francisco Xavier de Arivechi, but by 1793, it served Mission Nuestra Señora de los Angeles de Sahuaripa. | |
| Santa Rosalía de Onapa | | | 1627 | It served Mission San Francisco Xavier de Arivechi. It eventually became a mission with two/three visitas. | |
| Pondia | | | 1627 | It served Mission San Francisco Xavier de Arivechi. | |
| San Francisco de Soyopa | | | 1628 | It served Mission San Ignacio (de Loyola) de Ónavas. The visita is also known as San Joseph de Soyopa | |
| Santa María del Populo de Tónichi | | | 1629 | It served Mission San Ignacio (de Loyola) de Ónavas. The visita is also known as Nuestra Señora del Populo de Tonintzi | |
| Nuestra Senora Asuncion Alamos | | | 1629 | It served Mission San José de Mátape. | |
| Santa Cruz de Nácori | | | 1629 | It served Mission San José de Mátape. | |
| Santa Rosalia | | | 1637 | It served Mission San Miguel de Ures. | |
| Nuestra Señora de la Concepción de Baviácora | | | 1638 | It was originally founded as a head mission, with a visita at San Pedro Aconchi. Later, it became a visita of Aconchi. | |
| Nuestra Señora del Rosario de Nacámeri | | | 1638 | It served Mission San Miguel de Ures, Mission Nuestra Señora del Populo del Seri, and Mission Nuestra Señora de la Ascención de Opodepe, in chronological order. | |
| San Pedro Aconchi | | | 1639 | It was initially founded as a visita of Mission Nuestra Señora de la Concepción de Baviácora. Over time, that mission became its visita. | |
| San Lorenzo de Güepaca | | | 1639 | Also known as San Lorenzo de Huépac, it had a visita at Nuestra Señora de los Remedios de Banámichi. Later, it became a visita of Banámichi. | |
| Nuestra Señora de los Remedios de Beramitzi | | 30.00765, -110.21768 | 1639 | Also known as Nuestra Señora de los Remedios de Banámichi. It originally served Mission San Lorenzo de Güepaca. It eventually became a head mission, with the mission it used to serve (Guepaca) as its visita. | |
| Nuestra Señora de la Asunción de Opodepe | | | 1644 | Originally served Mission Los Santos Reyes de Cucurpe. In 1762, it became a mission, with Nuestra Señora del Rosario de Nacameri as its visita. | |
| San Luis Gonzága de Bacadéhuachi | | | 1645 | It served Mission Nuestra Señora de Nácori Chico. Eventually, it became a mission with two visitas (one of them being San Ignacio Mochapa). | |
| Santo Tomás de Serva | | | 1645 | It served Mission Nuestra Señora de Nácori Chico. | |
| San Ignacio Mochapa | | | 1645 | It served Mission San Luis Gonzága de Bacadéhuachi | |
| San Miguel de Bavispe | | | 1645 | It served Mission Santa María de Baserac. It may have become a head mission. | |
| San Juan Evangelista de Huachinera | | | 1645 | Originally served Mission Santa María de Baserac. It became a mission by 1688 and had one visita. | |
| San Ignacio de Oputo | | | 1645 | It served Mission San Francisco Xavier de Guásavas. | |
| Nuestra Señora de la Asunción de Cumpas | | | 1645 | It originally served Mission San Miguel Arcángel de Oposura, then served Mission San Francisco Xavier de Guásavas. | |
| San Ignacio de Sinoquipe | | | 1646 | It served Mission Nuestra Señora de los Remedios de Beramitzi. The church was being restored during 1955 and 1956. | |
| San Miguel Tuape | | | 1647 | It served Mission Los Santos Reyes de Cucurpe. | |
| San Miguel Bacoachi | | | 1648 | It served Mission Nuestra Señora de la Asunción de Arizpe. | |
| San José de Chinapa | | | 1648 | It served Mission Nuestra Señora de la Asunción de Arizpe. Briefly an independent mission. | |
| Santa Rosa de Tebadéguachi | | | 1653 | It served Mission (Nuestro Padre) San Ignacio de Cuquiarachi. | |
| Guadalupe de T(e)uricachi | | | 1653 | It served Mission (Nuestro Padre) San Ignacio de Cuquiarachi. | |
| San Francisco Xavier de Rebeico | | | 1673 | It served Mission San José de Mátape. | |
| San Ildefonso de Yécora | | | 1673 | It originally served Mission Santa Rosalia de Onapa. Later it had a visita at San Francisco Xavier de Maicoba. | |
| San Francisco Xavier de Maicoba | | | 1676 | It served Mission San Ildefonso de Yécora. | |
| San José de Imuris | | | 1687 | It served Mission (Nuestro Padre) de San Ignacio de Cabórica. | |
| San Juan de Bisani(n)g | | | Likely 1690's | It served Mission La Purísima Concepción de Nuestra Señora de Caborca. On Valentine's Day, 1694, it became a mission, and was named San Valentin del Bizani. However, it stayed as a visita for most of its life after. | |
| Santa María Magdalena | | 30.6302, -110.9734 | 1690 | It served Mission (Nuestro Padre) de San Ignacio de Cabórica. It may have had a visita at one point. | |
| San Antonio (Paduano) de(l) Oquitoa | | 30.74371, -111.73494 | 1690 | Founded by Father Eusebio Kino as a visita to Mission San Pedro y San Pablo del Tubutama. In 1756 it was a visita of Mission Santa Teresa de Atil. | |
| Santa Teresa de Atil | | | 1692 | It served Mission San Pedro y San Pablo del Tubutama. | |
| San Diego del Pitiquito | | 30.67504, -112.05761 | 1694 | It served Mission La Purísima Concepción de Nuestra Señora de Caborca. | |
| San Lázaro | | | 1695 | It served Mission Santa María Suamca. | |
| San Luis Baconacos | | | 1697 | At various times, it served Mission Los Santos Ángeles de Guevavi. Originally, Father Eusebio Kino founded a ranch here, and by 1706 its church was built. | |
| Santa María de Bugota/Santa María de Suamca | | | 1698 | It served Mission Nuestra Señora del Pilar y Santiago de Cocóspera. Founded by Father Eusebio Kino. He said the first mass there in 1698, but the actual church was built in 1706. | |
| San Ambrosio del Busanic y Tucubavia | | | 1698 | It served Mission Santa Gertrudis del Sáric. | |
| San Bernardo de Aquimuri | | | Between 1700-1701 | Founded by Father Eusebio Kino. It served Mission Santa Gertrudis del Sáric. By 1706, a church was built here, and stood till at least 1772. | |
| San Ildefonso de Ostimuri | | | | It served Mission Santa Rosalia de Onapa. | |

== See also ==
- Estancia – Spanish colonial ranch
- Reductions
