= Segno =

- Frazione
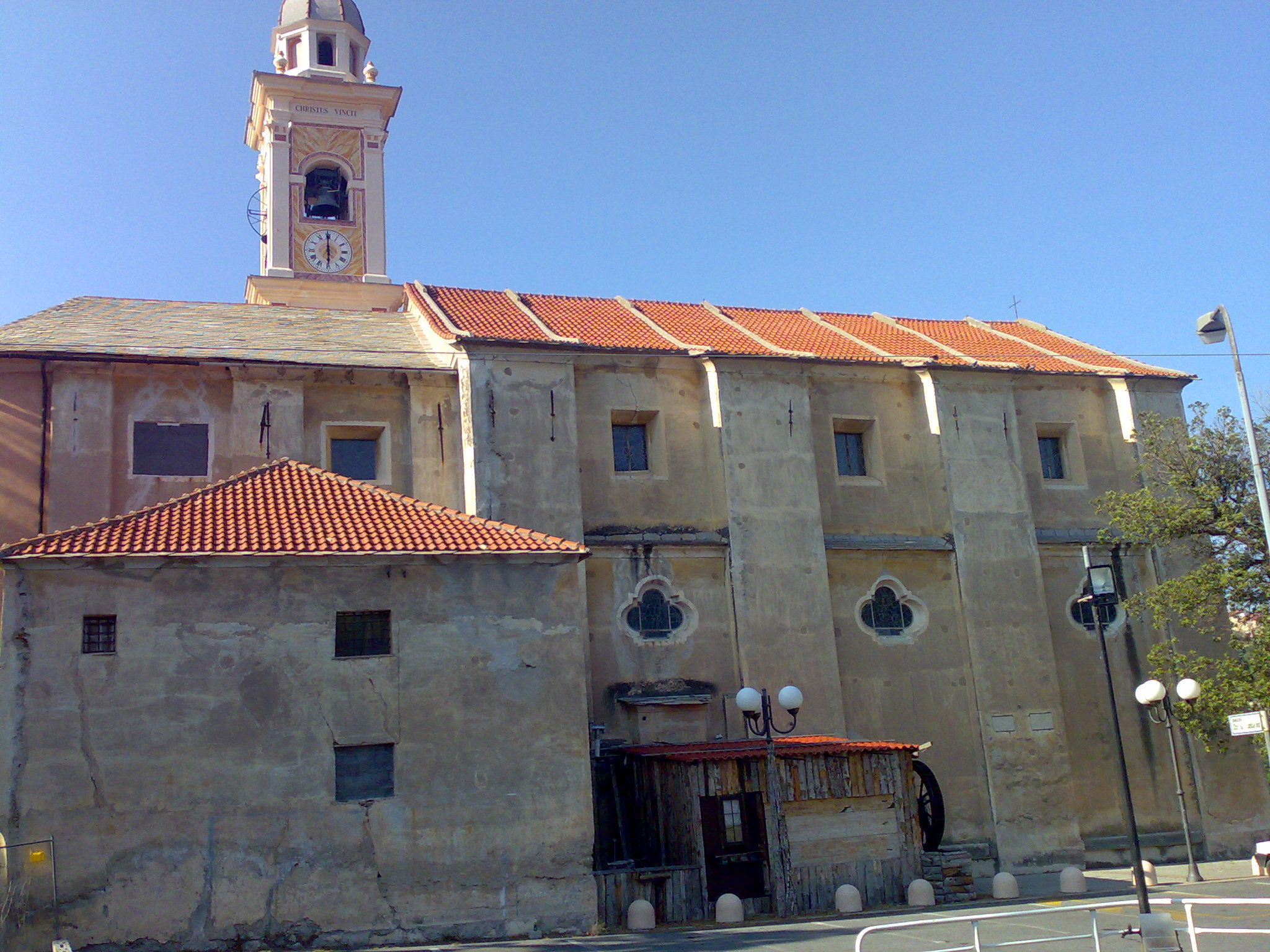
- Parish church of San Maurizio
- Interactive map of Segno
- Coordinates: 44°15′14″N 8°23′01″E
- Country: Italy
- Region: Liguria
- Province: Savona
- Comune: Vado Ligure
- Elevation: 191 m (627 ft)

Population (2001)
  - Total: 354
- Time zone: UTC+1 (CET)
  - Summer (DST): UTC+2 (CEST)
- Postal code: 17047

Segno is a village in North Western Italy in the region of Liguria. It belongs to the Municipality of Vado Ligure.

Its countryside landscape makes it a popular venue for outdoor sports including mountain biking, cross-country running, trail and cross-country motorbike, and hiking.

== Events and Festivals ==
- Escargots festival in the beginning of June
- Fish festival in mid-July
- Eggplant festival in early August.

== Landmarks and architectural sites ==
- San Maurizio Church
- Santa Margherita Oratory
- San Bernardo Church
- Ruggiuetta Bridge
- Castle
- French Army Campsite
