= Mission Nuestra Señora del Pilar y Santiago de Cocóspera =

Spanish mission in the Sonoran desert

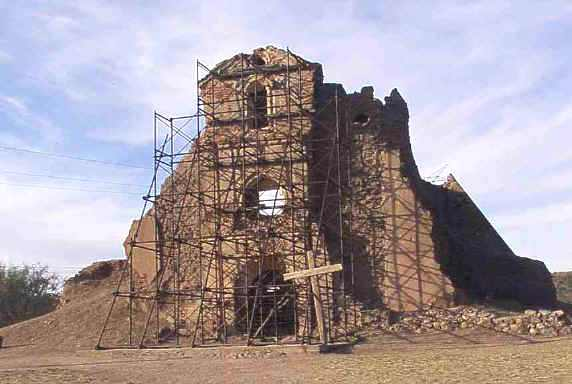
Mission Nuestra Señora del Pilar y Santiago de Cocóspera, Sonora, México..

Nuestra Señora del Pilar y Santiago de Cocóspera was a Spanish mission in the Sonoran desert.

== History ==
Jesuit missionary Eusebio Kino founded Cocóspera in 1689. It was initially a visita of Mission San José de Imuris, and at various times served as an independent mission or as a visita of Mission Nuestra Señora de los Dolores or Mission Santa María Suamca.

Churches at Cocóspera were burnt by Apaches in 1698, 1746, and 1776, and repeatedly rebuilt by the missionaries. Due to ongoing Apache raids, the mission was eventually abandoned in 1845.

John Ross Browne sketched the mission in 1864.

== Missionaries ==
Missionaries stationed at Cocóspera included:

- Pedro Sandoval (1691–?)
- Juan Bautista Barli (1693–1694)
- Fernando Bayerca (1694–?)
- Pedro Ruiz de Contreras (1697–1698)
- Francisco Hlawa (1757–?)
- Francisco Roche (1768–?)
- Francisco Cobas (1798–?)
- Rafael Díaz (1831–1836)
