= Baviácora Municipality =

Coordinates: 29.6185°N 110.1416°W

Baviácora
- Municipality
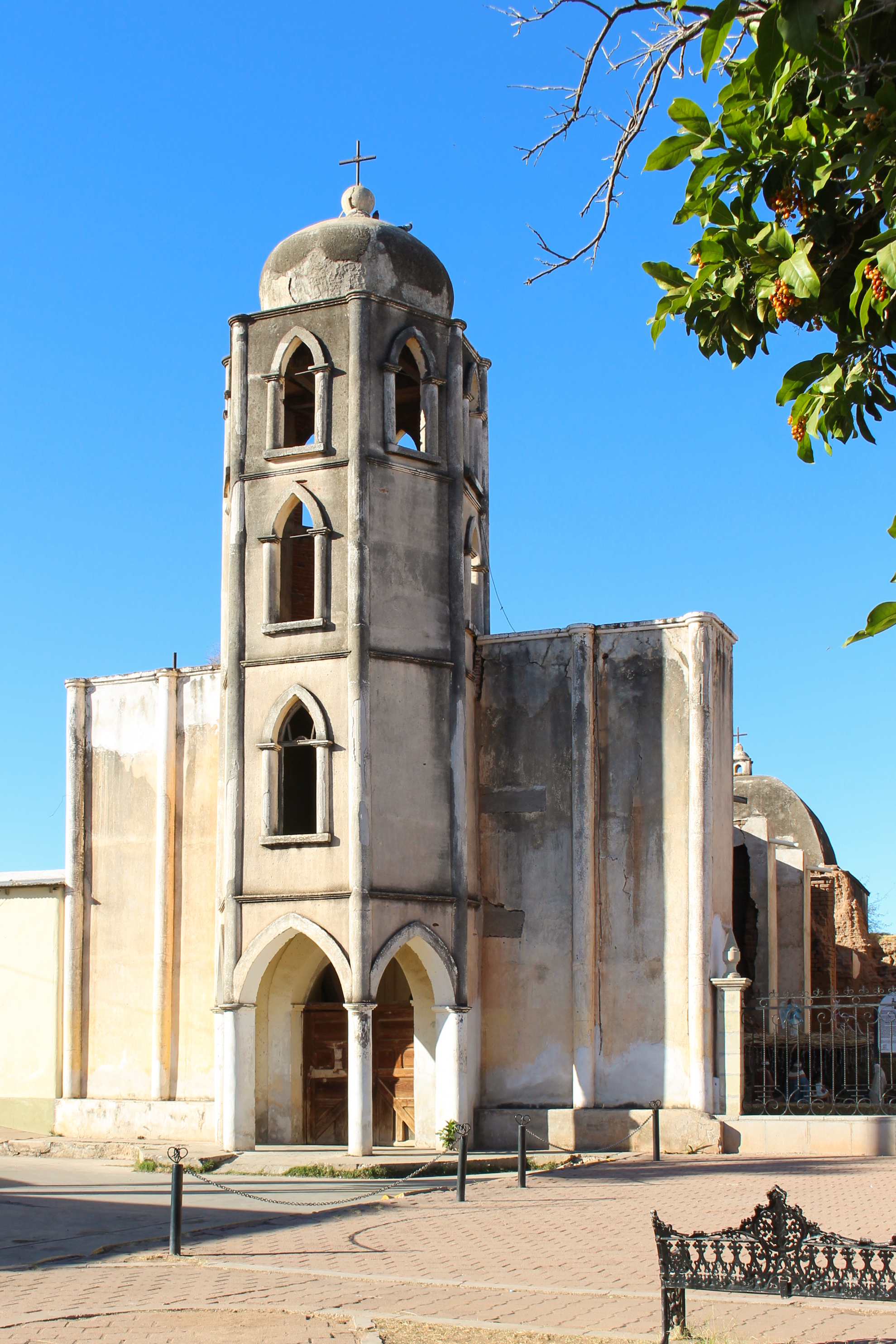
- Templo de la Purísima Concepción, Baviácora

- Coat of arms
- Interactive map of Baviácora
- Country: Mexico
- State: Sonora
- Municipal seat: Baviácora

Population (2020)
  - Total: 3,191
- Time zone: UTC-7 (Zona Pacífico)
- Website: baviacora.gob.mx

Baviácora is a municipality in the state of Sonora in northwestern Mexico. In the 2020 census it reported a population of 3,191.

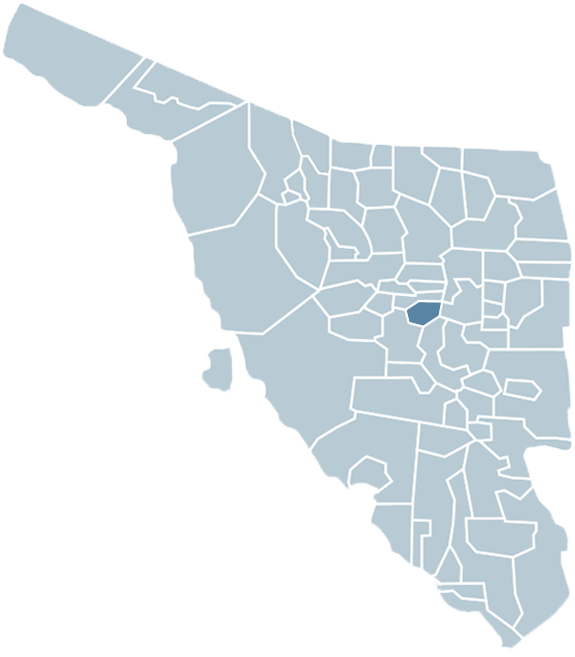
Locator map of the municipality of Baviácora in Sonora

The town of Baviácora serves as the municipal seat.
