= Escambe =

- U.S. National Register of Historic Places
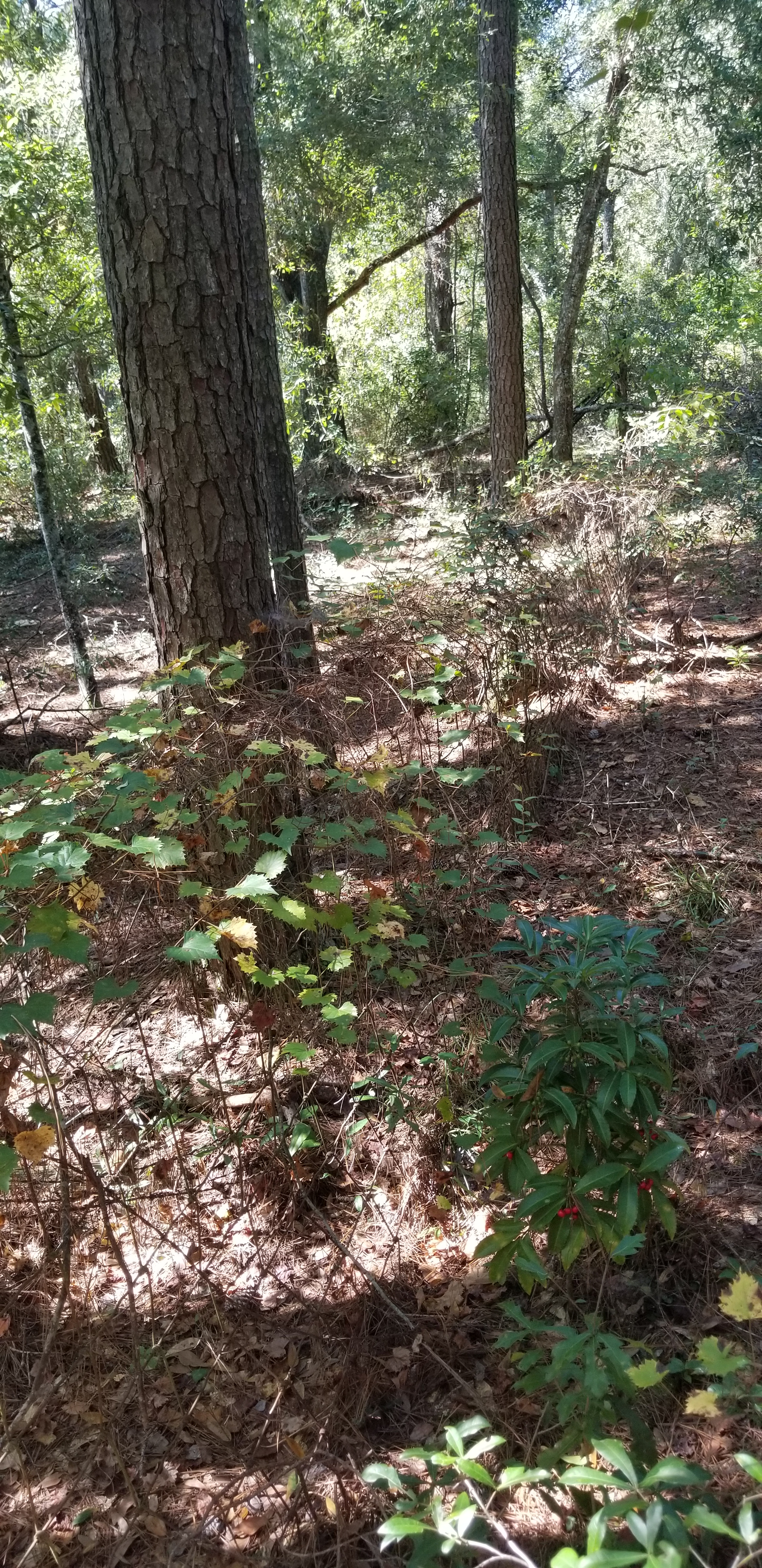
- Site of Escambe

- Location within Florida Location within the United States
- Location: Leon County, Florida, USA
- Nearest city: Tallahassee, Florida
- Coordinates: 30.48°N 84.28°W
- NRHP reference No.: 71000240
- Added to NRHP: May 14, 1971

Escambe (also known as San Cosme y San Damián de Cupaica, San Damián de Cupaica, San Cosmo y San Damías de Escambe, or San Damián de Cupahica) was a Spanish Franciscan mission built in the 17th century in the Florida Panhandle, three miles northwest of the present-day town of Tallahassee, Florida. It was part of Spain's effort to colonize the region, and convert the Timucuan and Apalachee Indians to Christianity. The mission lasted until 1704, when it was destroyed by a group of Creek Indians and South Carolinians.

The site where the original mission stood was added to the U.S. National Register of Historic Places on May 14, 1971.

San Damián de Cupaica was founded in 1639, the third Spanish mission in Apalachee Province. San Damián survived James Moore's invasion of Apalachee Province in January 1704, but was captured by Creek warriors in June 1704. When the Spanish abandoned their headquarters in San Luis de Talimali later that year, leaving all of the Apalachee Province unprotected, residents of Cupaica joined other Apalachees, Chatatos and Yemassees in migrating to the area of Pensacola, Florida.

A later mission named San Joseph de Escambe was established in 1741 at the present-day community of Molino, Florida along the Escambia River north of Pensacola, lending its name both to the river and later to Escambia County, Florida.

== See also ==
- Spanish missions in Florida
