= Chinapa =

Village in Sonora, Mexico

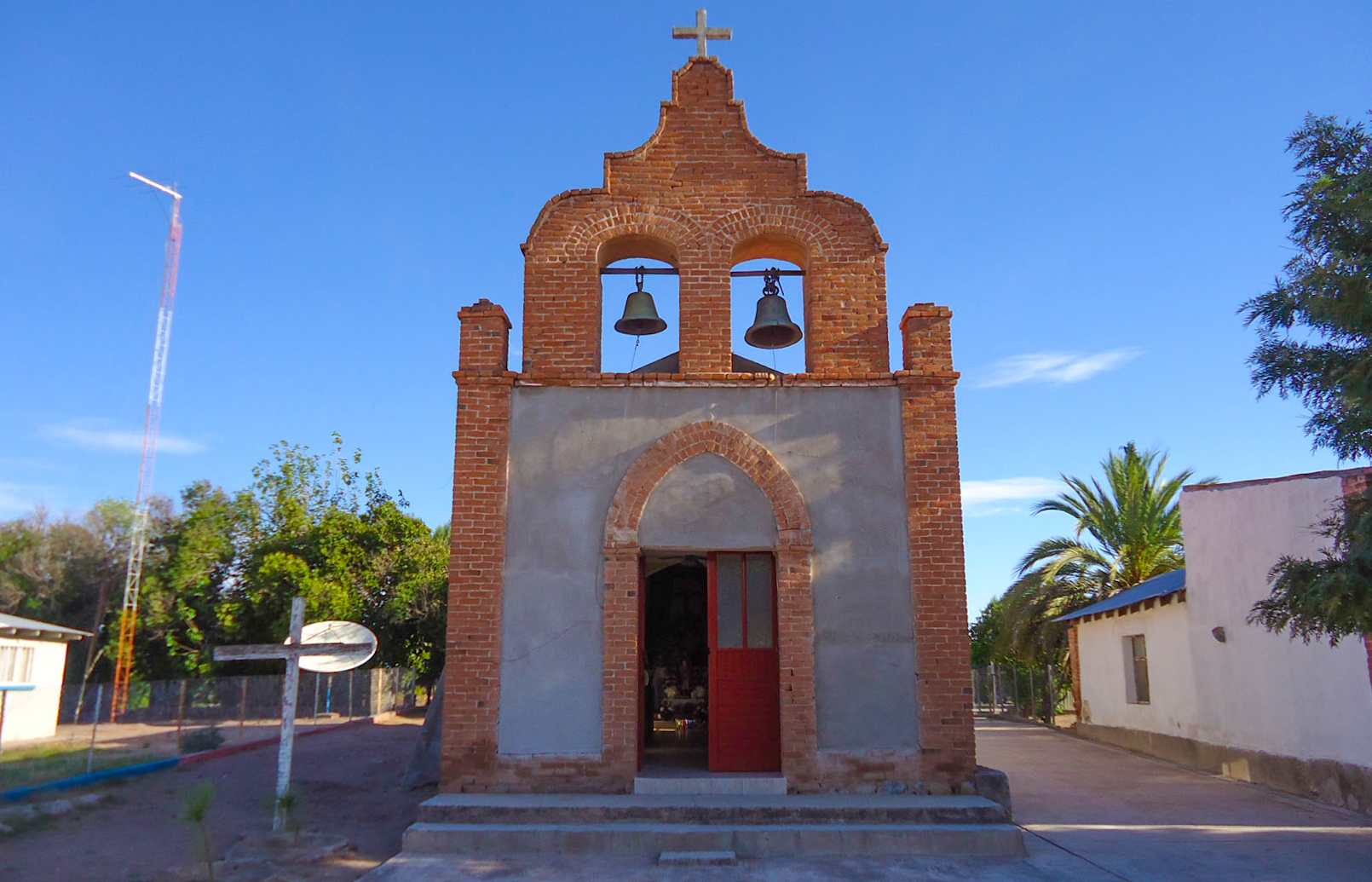
- Nuestra Señora de Guadalupe, a Catholic church in Chinapa
- Interactive map of Chinapa
- Coordinates: 30°26′15″N 110°02′00″W
- Country: Mexico
- State: Sonora
- Municipality: Arizpe

Population
  - Total: 139

Chinapa (from Opata Chinopa, meaning "place of the cascalotes") is a village in Arizpe Municipality in the central-northern region of the Mexican state of Sonora, near the Sierra Madre Occidental and the Sonora River.

== History ==
San José de Chinapa was founded in 1648 by Jesuit missionaries, as a visita of Mission Nuestra Señora de la Asunción de Arizpe.
