= Vado Ligure =

Comune in Liguria, Italy

- Comune
- Comune di Vado Ligure
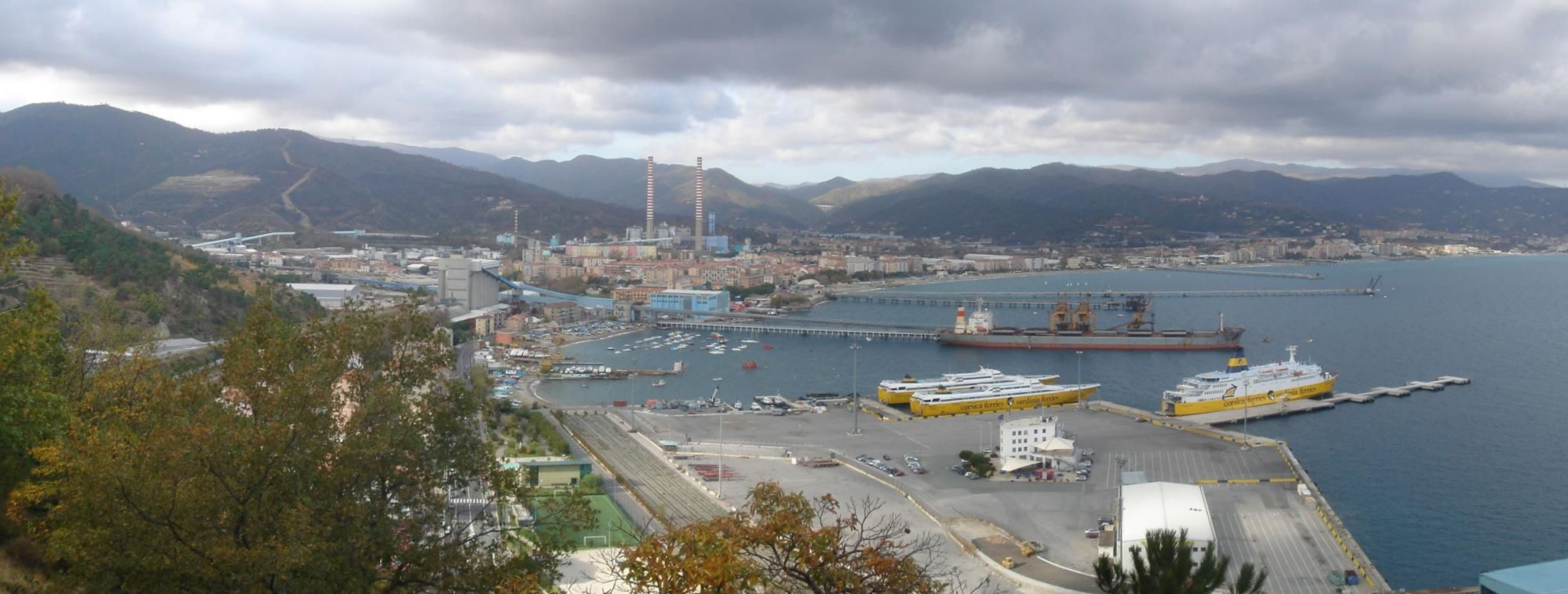

- Coat of arms

- Location within Italy Location within Liguria
- Coordinates: 44°16′N 8°26′E
- Country: Italy
- Region: Liguria
- Province: Province of Savona (SV)
- Frazioni: Porto Vado, Segno, Sant'Ermete, San Genesio, Bossarino, Valle di Vado

Government
  - Mayor: Fabio Gilardi

Area
  - Total: 23.79 km^{2} (9.19 sq mi)
- Elevation: 12 m (39 ft)

Population (31 December 2011)
  - Total: 8,170
  - Density: 343/km^{2} (889/sq mi)
- Demonym: Vadesi
- Time zone: UTC+1 (CET)
  - Summer (DST): UTC+2 (CEST)
- Postal code: 17047
- Dialing code: 019
- Patron saint: St. John the Baptist
- Saint day: 24 June
- Website: Official website

Vado Ligure (Ligurian: Voæ), in antiquity Vada Sabatia, is a port town and comune in the province of Savona, Liguria, in northern Italy. The town despite its size has become one of the largest ports in Northwest Italy.

== Economy ==
Vado has a large industrial and commercial port.

Vado Ligure is home to a railway construction plant, founded in 1905 as Società Italiana Westinghouse. In 1919 it was taken over by Tecnomasio Italia Brown Boveri and, since 2001, it has been part of Bombardier Transportation. It currently produces the FS Class E.464 locomotives.

The town's territory also includes an electric power plant, whose two towers, 200 metres (660 ft) high, are visible for kilometres in the neighbourhood.

== Twin towns ==
- La Ravoire, France, since 2002
