= Ónavas =

Town in Onavas, Sonora, Mexico

Coordinates: 28°27′N 109°31′W

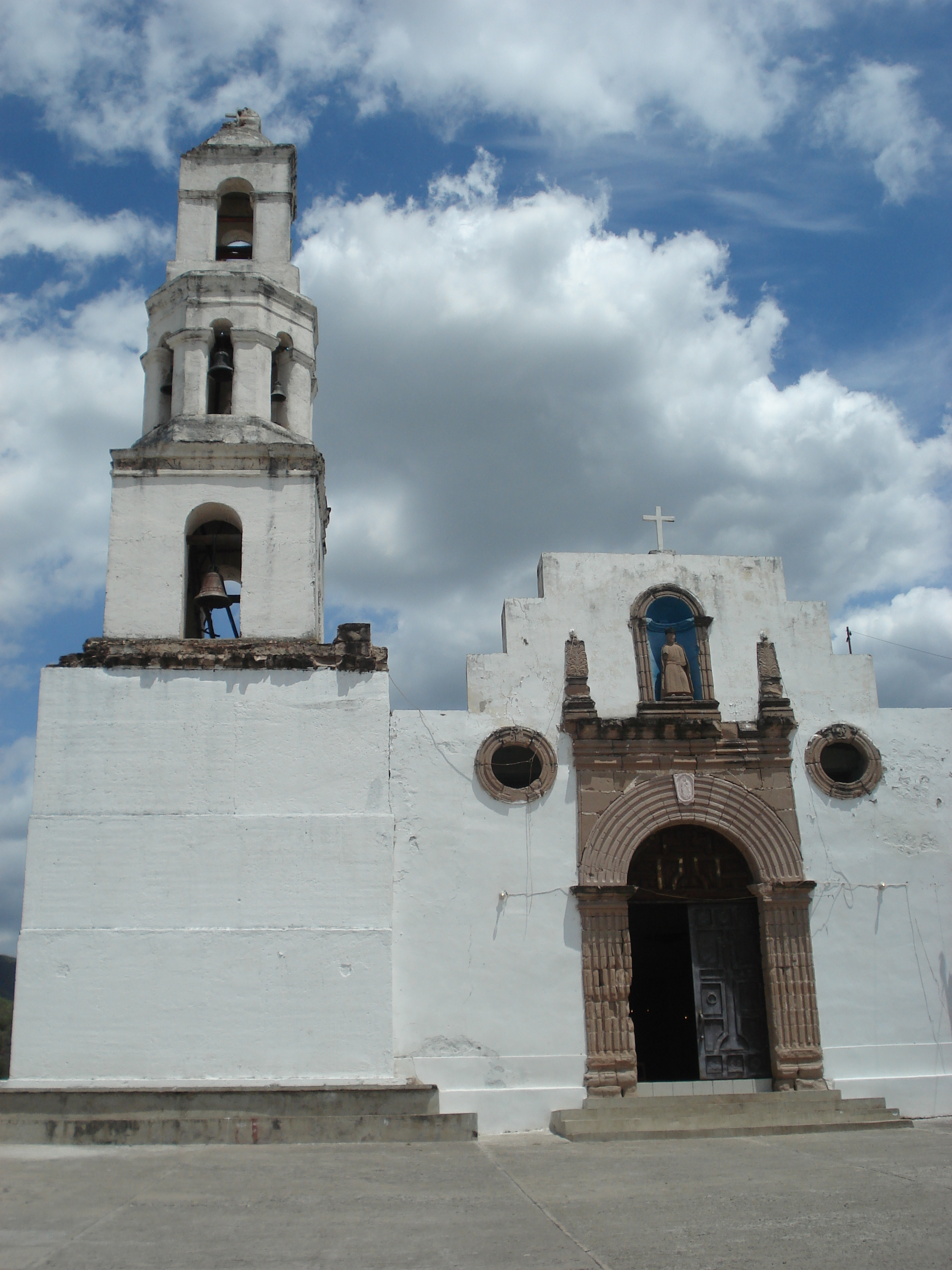
Church of Onavas

Ónavas is a small town surrounded by Onavas Municipality in the southeast of the Mexican state of Sonora.

== Name ==
The name Ónavas comes from the Cahita language and means salty water.

== Geography ==
=== Climate ===
Climate data for Ónavas, Sonora (1981-2010)
Month	Jan	Feb	Mar	Apr	May	Jun	Jul	Aug	Sep	Oct	Nov	Dec	Year
Record high °C (°F)	36.5 (97.7)	40.0 (104.0)	41.5 (106.7)	45.0 (113.0)	47.5 (117.5)	49.0 (120.2)	46.5 (115.7)	45.5 (113.9)	47.5 (117.5)	43.5 (110.3)	40.0 (104.0)	39.5 (103.1)	49.0 (120.2)
Mean daily maximum °C (°F)	25.8 (78.4)	28.1 (82.6)	30.8 (87.4)	34.2 (93.6)	38.0 (100.4)	40.9 (105.6)	37.9 (100.2)	36.4 (97.5)	36.6 (97.9)	34.8 (94.6)	30.5 (86.9)	26.0 (78.8)	33.3 (91.9)
Daily mean °C (°F)	15.7 (60.3)	17.6 (63.7)	20.1 (68.2)	23.6 (74.5)	27.5 (81.5)	32.1 (89.8)	31.0 (87.8)	29.8 (85.6)	29.3 (84.7)	25.7 (78.3)	20.4 (68.7)	16.1 (61.0)	24.1 (75.4)
Mean daily minimum °C (°F)	5.7 (42.3)	7.2 (45.0)	9.3 (48.7)	13.0 (55.4)	17.1 (62.8)	23.4 (74.1)	24.0 (75.2)	23.3 (73.9)	22.0 (71.6)	16.6 (61.9)	10.3 (50.5)	6.2 (43.2)	14.8 (58.6)
Record low °C (°F)	−6.0 (21.2)	−9.5 (14.9)	−9.0 (15.8)	4.0 (39.2)	5.0 (41.0)	13.0 (55.4)	15.0 (59.0)	12.0 (53.6)	13.0 (55.4)	7.0 (44.6)	0.0 (32.0)	−11.5 (11.3)	−11.5 (11.3)
Average precipitation mm (inches)	27.8 (1.09)	24.2 (0.95)	10.7 (0.42)	5.6 (0.22)	4.8 (0.19)	28.9 (1.14)	170.1 (6.70)	156.8 (6.17)	82.6 (3.25)	35.1 (1.38)	22.0 (0.87)	40.1 (1.58)	608.7 (23.96)
Average precipitation days (≥ 0.1 mm)	2.7	2.1	1.2	0.8	0.7	3.0	12.1	10.1	5.9	2.5	1.9	2.7	45.7
Source: Servicio Meteorológico National

It was founded in 1622 as Mission San Ignacio de Loyola de Ónavas by two Jesuit missionaries: Diego Vandersipe and Blas Paredes.

== Economic activity ==
Agriculture covered 2,227 hectares (2000), most of which were not irrigated. Main crops are alfalfa, beans, corn and the production of fodder for the cattle industry. Sonora Turismo

Cattle raising was carried out by sixty percent of the work force (2000) and there were 6,614 head of cattle. Sonora Turismo
