= Baviácora =

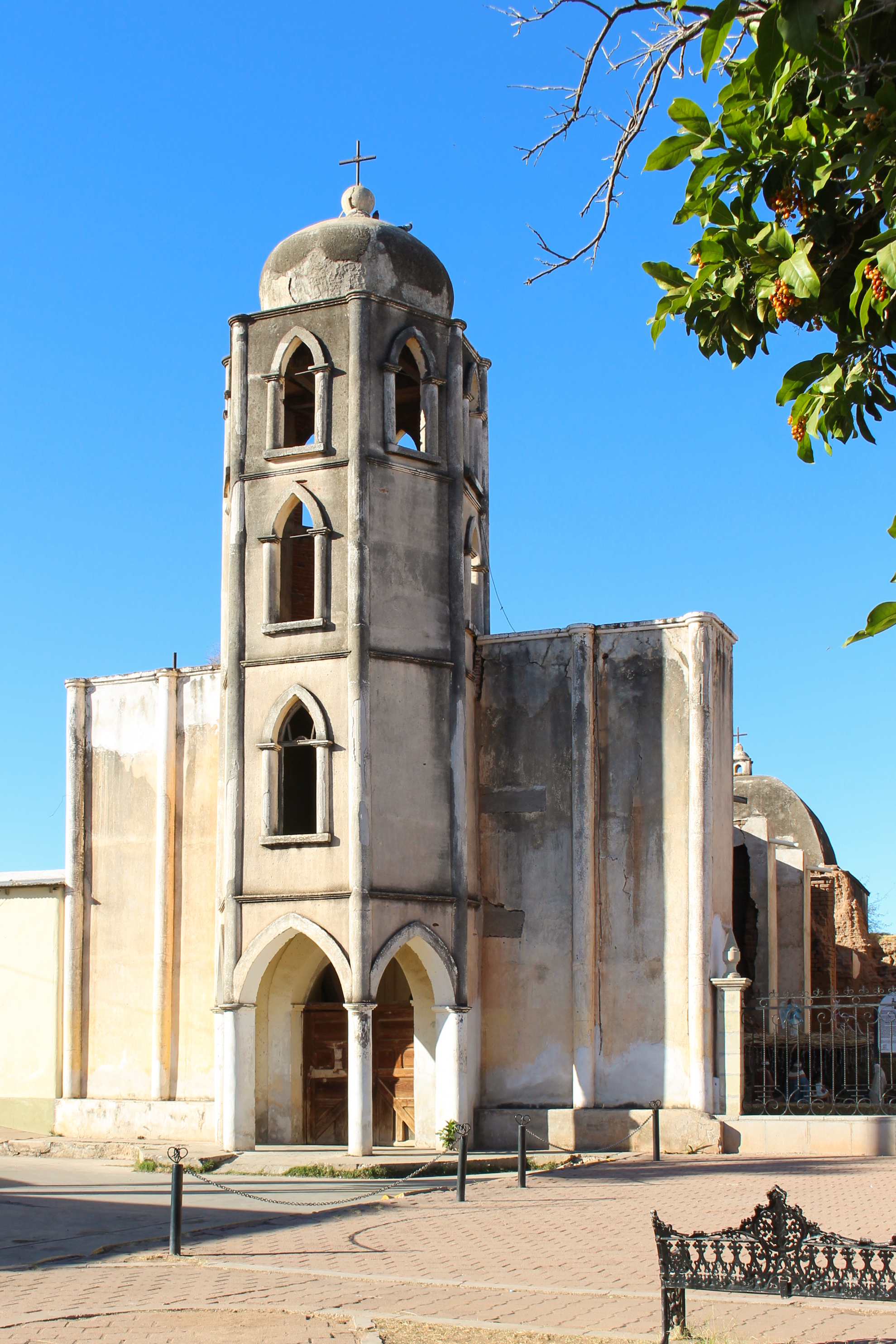
Temple of the Immaculate Conception in Baviácora, Sonora

Baviácora is a small town and the municipal seat of the surrounding municipality of the Mexican state of Sonora. The geographical coordinates are 29°42′N 110°09′W.

== Geography ==
The municipality is located almost in the center of the state at a distance of 125 kilometers from the state capital, Hermosillo, in the valley of the Río Sonora. In the north is the municipality of Aconchi, in the south the municipalities of Ures and Villa Pesqueira, in the east the municipality of Cumpas and in the west the municipalities of Ures and Rayón. See map at . The town is situated at an elevation of 620 meters above sea level.

=== Climate ===
The climate is hot and dry. From June to September the average high is 30.1°, while from December to January the average minimum is 13.5°C. The annual average temperature is 22.7°C.

== Area and Population ==
The area of the municipality is 858.96 km^{2}. The population in 2005 was 3,404 (3,724 in 2000) with 1,974 residing in the municipal seat (2000 INEGI).

== Education and health care ==
There are only primary and middle schools. Students need to travel to Hermosillo or Ures for a secondary- school education. There is no hospital. Healthcare is provided by public clinics, which provide only non-specialized care.

== Economy ==
The economy is highly dependent on agriculture and cattle raising. The main crops are corn and beans. Grasses are grown for cattle fodder. The cattle herd numbered over 17,000 head in 2000.

There are micro-industries and one assembly plant (maquiladora), which manufactures clothing.

== Tourist attractions ==
The main tourist attraction is the mission church of Nuestra Señora de la Concepción de Banácora.

== History ==
In 1639, the Portuguese Jesuit missionary Bartolomé Castaños established the mission of Nuestra Señora de la Concepción de Baviácora. The name Baviácora is a transliteration of the Opata word "babícori," the mint that grows along the Río Sonora. Before this, in 1639, the Opata had been conquered by the Spanish general Pedro de Perea. Baviácora became a municipality in 1931.

== Sources consulted ==
- Enciclopedia de los Municipios de Mexico
- INEGI
