= Mission Nuestra Señora de los Dolores =

Church in Sonora, Mexico

- Location: 30 km north of Cucurpe, Sonora
- English translation: Mission of Our Lady of Sorrows
- Founded: March 13, 1687
- Founded by: Father Eusebio Francisco Kino
- Native tribe: Pima

Mission Nuestra Señora de los Dolores is a former Mission church in Sonora, Mexico.

It was founded by Jesuit missionary Father Kino on March 13, 1687. The Mission church was built near the Pima settlement of Cosari, about 30 km north of Cucurpe, Sonora. The mission name means "Our Lady of Sorrows" and it was the mother mission of the Pimeria Alta.

By the late 1690s, the Mission consisted of a church, a water-powered mill, a carpentry shop, a blacksmith's area, orchards, vineyards, and a winery. By 1744, the Mission had been abandoned. Only a cemetery in the fallen nave of Kino’s mission remains today.

== See also ==
- List of Jesuit sites
- Spanish Missions in the Sonoran Desert
