= Lake Novillo =

Lake in Sonora, Mexico

- Presa El Novillo (Spanish)
- Location within Mexico
- Location: Sonora, Mexico
- Coordinates: 28°58′38″N 109°38′32″W
- Type: man-made lake

Lake Novillo ("Presa El Novillo" in Spanish) is a man-made lake in Sonora, Mexico, near the city of San Pedro de la Cueva. More formally known as "Plutarco Elias Calles Reservoir", it is located on the Yaqui River. The dam was placed into operation on November 14, 1964. It provides water for irrigation and can generate 135,000 kilowatts of electricity. The reservoir contains 2,925 million cubic metres of water.

When constructed, the lake flooded three towns, all historic Jesuit missions: Mission San Francisco Javier de Batuc, Mission Santa Maria de Tepupa, and Suaqui de Batuc.
