= Eusebio Kino =

German-Italian Jesuit missionary (1645–1711)

Venerable Eusebio Kino SJ
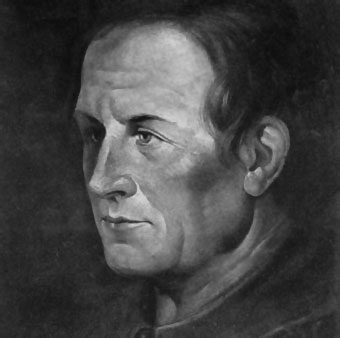
- Painted portrait of Eusebio Kino, c. 1700
- Born: 10 August 1645; Segno, Bishopric of Trent, Holy Roman Empire
- Died: 15 March 1711 (aged 65); Mission Santa Maria Magdalena, Pimería Alta, New Spain (now Magdalena de Kino, Sonora, Mexico)

Eusebio Francisco Kino, (Italian pronunciation: [/juːˈzeɪbiːoʊ frænˈsɪskoʊ ˈkiːnoʊ/] eh-oo-ZEH-byo fran-CHEE-sko KEE-no), SJ (Italian: Eusebio Francesco Chini, Spanish: Eusebio Francisco Kino, often referred to as Father Kino, was an Austrian Jesuit, missionary, geographer, explorer, cartographer, mathematician and astronomer born in the Bishopric of Trent in the County of Tyrol, Holy Roman Empire.

For the last 24 years of his life, he worked in the region then known as the Pimería Alta, modern-day Sonora in Mexico and southern Arizona in the United States. He explored the region and worked with the indigenous Native American population, including primarily the Tohono O'Odham, Sobaipuri and other Upper Piman groups. He proved that the Baja California Territory was not an island but a peninsula by leading an overland expedition there. By the time of his death, he had established 24 missions and visitas (country chapels or visiting stations).

== Early life ==
Kino was born Eusebio Chini (the spelling Kino was the version for use in Spanish-speaking domains) in the village of Segno, (now part of the municipality of Predaia), then in the Prince-bishopric of Trent, a part of the Count of Tyrol in the Austrian Circle of the Holy Roman Empire. In 1665, after his recovery from an illness, as part of a vow fulfillment, he adopted Francesco as second name, for devotion to Saint Francis Xavier.

The name is sometimes found in its Latin version (Eusebius Franciscus Chinus) or even in its originally German form (Eusebius Franz Kühn).

His parents were Francesco Chini and Margherita Luchi who belonged to the local noble families. The exact date of his birth is unknown but he was baptized on 10 August 1645 in the parish church, located in Taio. Kino was educated at the college of the Jesuits in Hall in Tirol, Austria, and after recuperating from a serious illness, he joined the Society of Jesus on 20 November 1665. From 1664 to 1669, he received religious training as a member of the Society at Freiburg, Ingolstadt, and Landsberg, Bavaria. After completing a final stage of training in the Society, during which he taught mathematics in Ingolstadt, he received Holy Orders as a priest on 12 June 1677.

Although Kino wanted to go to the Orient, he was sent to New Spain. He left for Spain from the pilgrimage center of Altötting, his last assignment in Central Europe. Due to travel delays while crossing Europe, he missed the ship on which he was to travel and had to wait a year for another ship. While waiting in Cádiz, Spain, he wrote some observations, done during late 1680 and early 1681, about his study of a comet (later known as Kirch's comet), which he published as the Exposición astronómica de el cometa. This publication was later the subject of a sonnet by the noted colonial nun and poet of New Spain, Sor (Sister) Juana Inés de la Cruz, O.S.H.

== Mission in Baja California ==
Kino's first assignment was to lead the Atondo expedition to the Baja California peninsula of Las Californias Province of New Spain. In 1683, the expedition was forced to abandon an attempted settlement and mission at La Paz because of hostilities with the natives. Later that year, he established a second settlement at Misión San Bruno. After a prolonged drought there in 1685, Kino and the Jesuit missionaries were forced to abandon the mission and return to the viceregal capital of Mexico City.

== Missions in the Pimería Alta ==
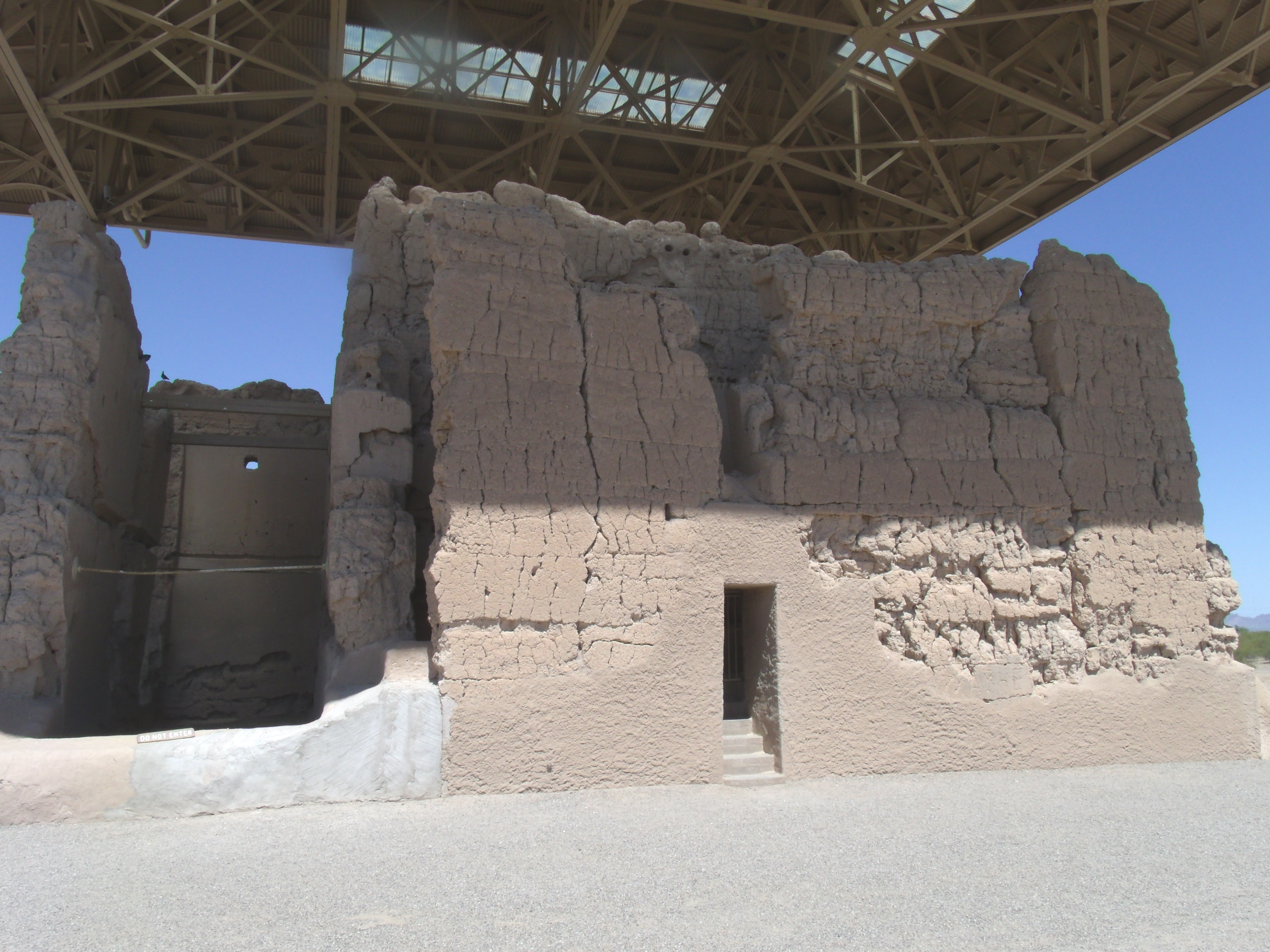
Written historic accounts of the Casa Grande in Coolidge, Arizona, begin with the journal entries of Padre Eusebio Francisco Kino when he visited the ruins in 1694.

Father Kino began his career in the Pimería Alta on the morning of 14 March 1687, 24 years and one day before his death on 15 March 1711. This was the morning he left Cucurpe, a town once considered the "Rim of Christendom."

Once Father Kino arrived in the Pimería Alta, at the request of the natives, he quickly established the first mission in a river valley in the mountains of Sonora. Subsequently, Kino traveled across northern Mexico, and to present day California and Arizona. He followed ancient trading routes established millennia prior by the natives. These trails were later expanded into roads. His many expeditions on horseback covered over 50,000 square miles (130,000 km^{2}), during which he mapped an area 200 miles (320 km) long and 250 miles (400 km) wide. Kino's maps were the most accurate maps of the region for more than 150 years after his death. Many of today's geographical features including the Colorado River were first named by Kino.

An influential map created by Father Kino during his mission in the Pimería Alta was titled Paso por tierra a la California y sus confinantes nuevas Naciones y Misiones nuevas de la Compañía de JHS [Jesús] en la América Septentrional ("Overland Passage to California and its Contiguous New Nations and New Missions of the Society of Jesus in Northern America"). It was based on thirty years of exploration and mapping, and it put an end to the idea of California as an island rather than a peninsula. Originally, in 1695, it depicted California as a peninsula but based on the presence of blue abalone shells (most likely Haliotis fulgens) from the Pacific coast in the Pimería Alta, the information from natives, and his own travels and sightings (in 1698 he ascended Cerro del Pinacate), Father Kino redrew the map in 1701. The map was printed in 1707 in Hamburg and Leipzig and became one of the best-known maps of northern New Spain. A notable colleague of Father Kino who accompanied him on one of his major travels (in 1694) and acted as the intermediary in the publication of this map and dissemination of Father Kino's knowledge in Europe was Carniolan priest Marko Anton Kappus.

Father Kino was important in the economic growth of the area, working with the already agricultural indigenous native peoples and introducing them to European seed, fruits, herbs and grains. He also taught the natives to raise cattle, sheep and goats. His initial mission herd of twenty cattle imported to Pimería Alta grew during his period to 70,000. Historian Herbert Bolton referred to Kino as Arizona's first rancher.

=== Interaction with indigenous peoples ===
In his travels in the Pimería Alta, Father Kino interacted with 16 different tribes. Some of these had land that bordered on the Pimería Alta, but there are many cases where tribal representatives crossed into the Piman lands to meet Kino. In other cases, Father Kino traveled into their lands to meet with them. The tribes Kino met with are the Cocopa, Eudeve, Hia C-ed O'odham (called Yumans by Kino), Kamia, Kavelchadon, Kiliwa, Maricopa, Mountain Pima, Opata, Quechan, Gila River Pima, Seri (Comcaac), Tohono O'odham, Sobaipuri, Western Apache, Yavapai, and the Yaqui (Yoeme).

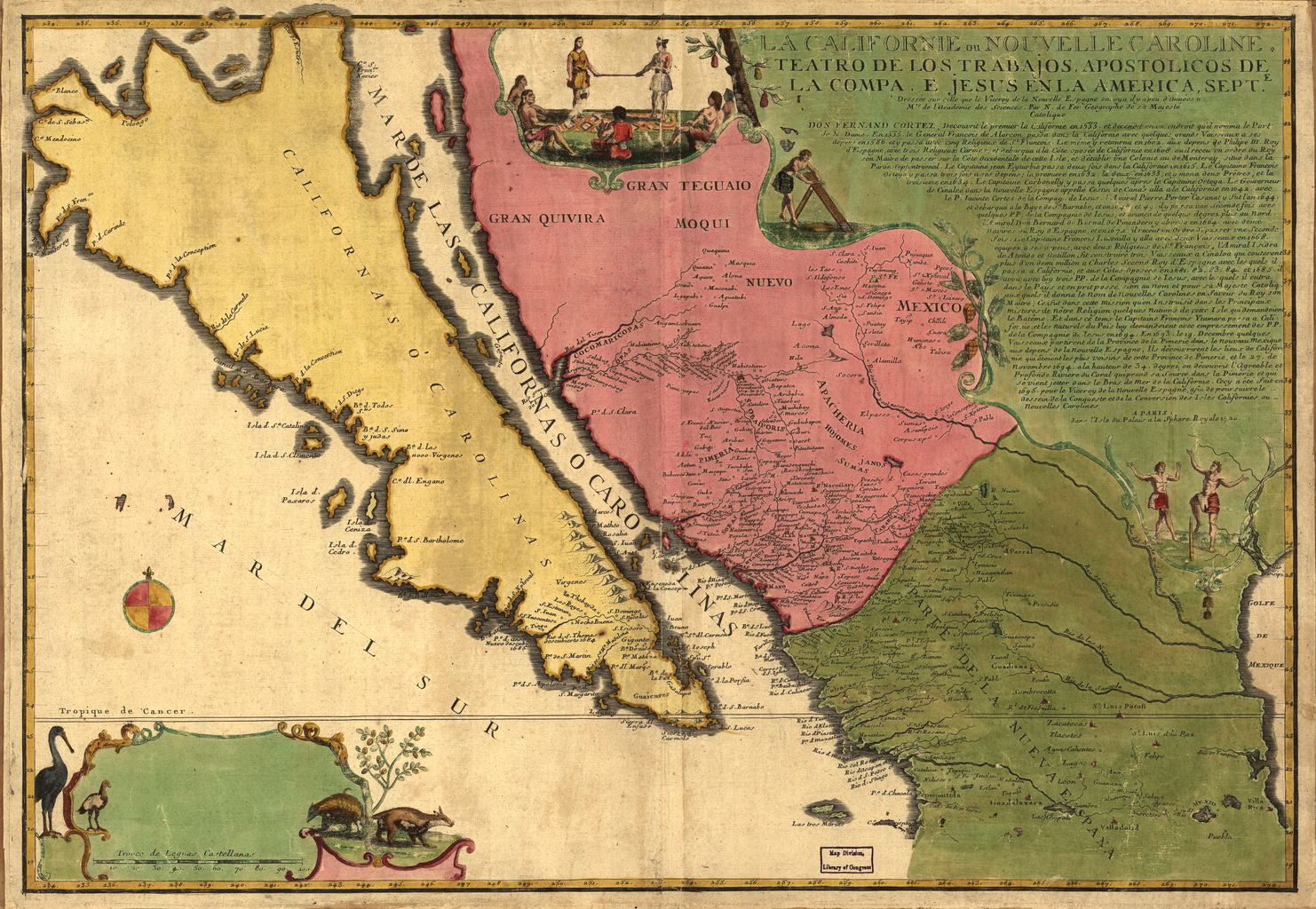
This map, which was hand-colored by cartographer Nicholas de Fer, was originally created by Kino in 1696. It is called California or New Carolina: Place of Apostolic Works of Society of Jesus at the Septentrional America.

=== Interests ===
Kino opposed the slavery and compulsory hard labor in the silver mines that the Spaniards forced on the native people. This also caused great controversy among his co-missionaries, many of whom acted according to the laws imposed by Spain on their territory.

Kino was also a writer, authoring books on religion, astronomy and cartography. He built missions extending from the present day states of Mexican Sonora, northeast for 150 miles (240 km), into present-day Arizona, where the San Xavier del Bac mission, near Tucson, a popular National Historic Landmark, is still a functioning Franciscan parish church. Kino constructed nineteen rancherías (villages), which supplied cattle to new settlements.

Kino practiced other crafts and was reportedly an expert astronomer, mathematician and cartographer, who drew the first accurate maps of Pimería Alta, the Gulf of California, and Baja California. Father Kino enjoyed making model ships out of wood. His knowledge of maps and ships led him to believe that Mexican Indians could easily access California by sea, a view taken with skepticism by missionaries in Mexico City. When Kino proposed and began making a boat that would be pushed across the Sonoran Desert to the Mexican west coast, a controversy arose, as many of his co-missionaries began to question Kino's faculties. Kino had an unusual amount of wealth for his vocation, which he used primarily to fund his missionary activities. His contemporaries reported on his wealth with suspicion.

== Death ==
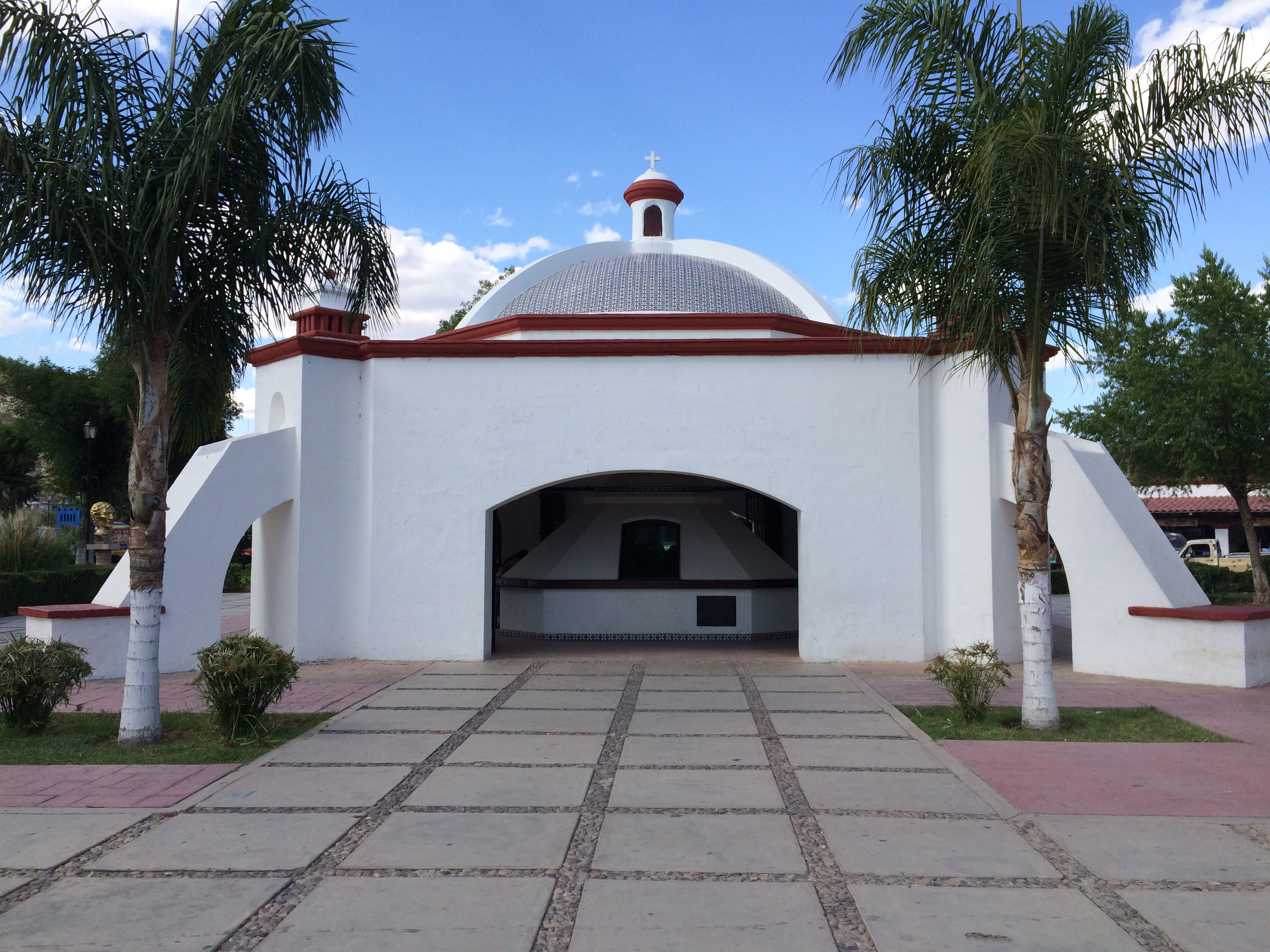
Crypt housing the remains of Father Kino in Magdalena de Kino.

Kino remained among his missions until his death. He died from fever on 15 March 1711, aged 65, in what is now Magdalena de Kino, Sonora, Mexico. A team of anthropologists and historians discovered Kino's grave on 19 May 1966. Kino lies buried next to Father Ignacio Iturmendi and Father Manuel González. The successful discovery ended nearly forty years of failures to identify the grave site. Kino's skeletal remains can be viewed in his crypt, which is a national monument of Mexico.

== Legacy ==
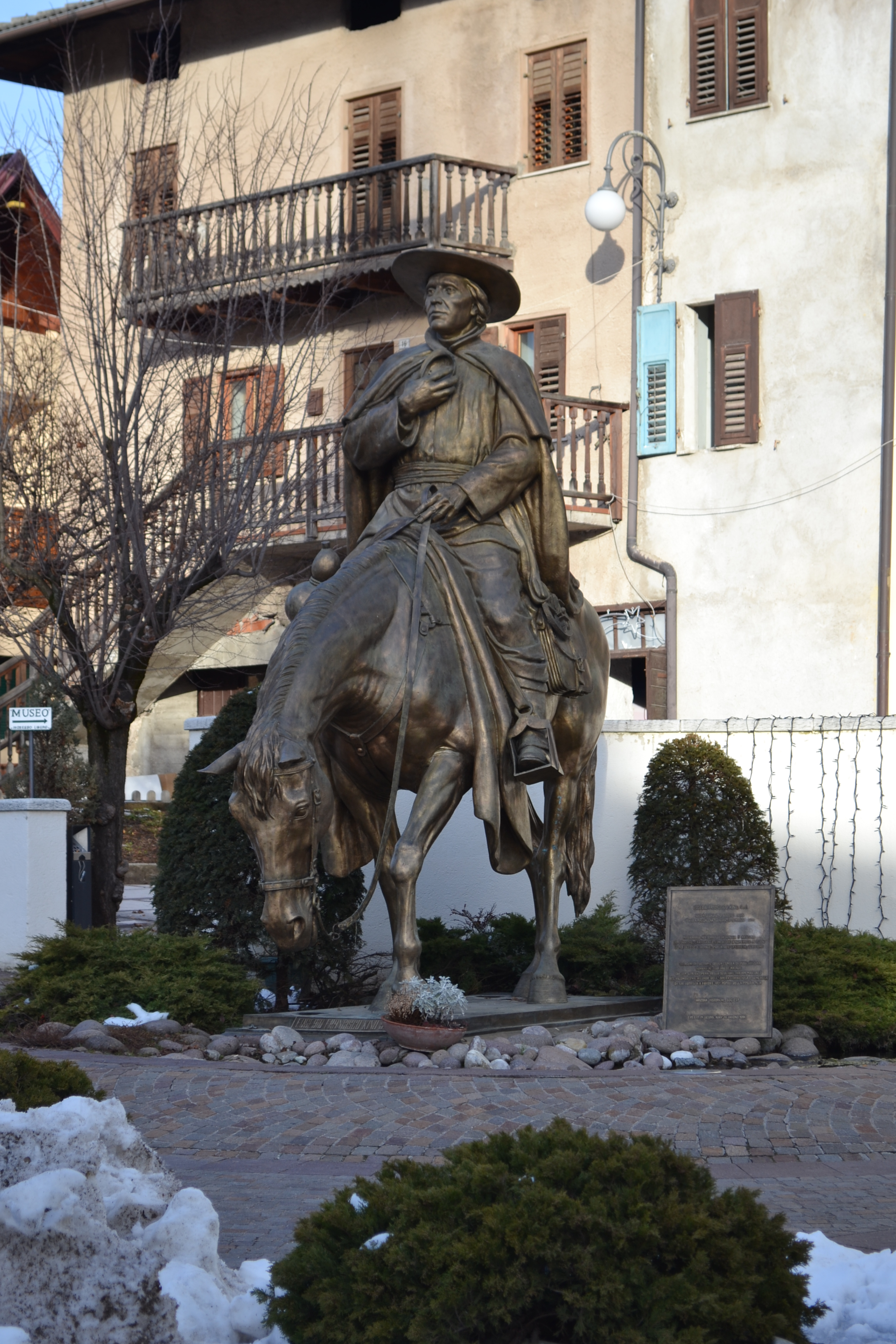
Equestrian statue of Father Kino by Julian Martinez Soto, in his birthplace of Segno, Liguria, Italy

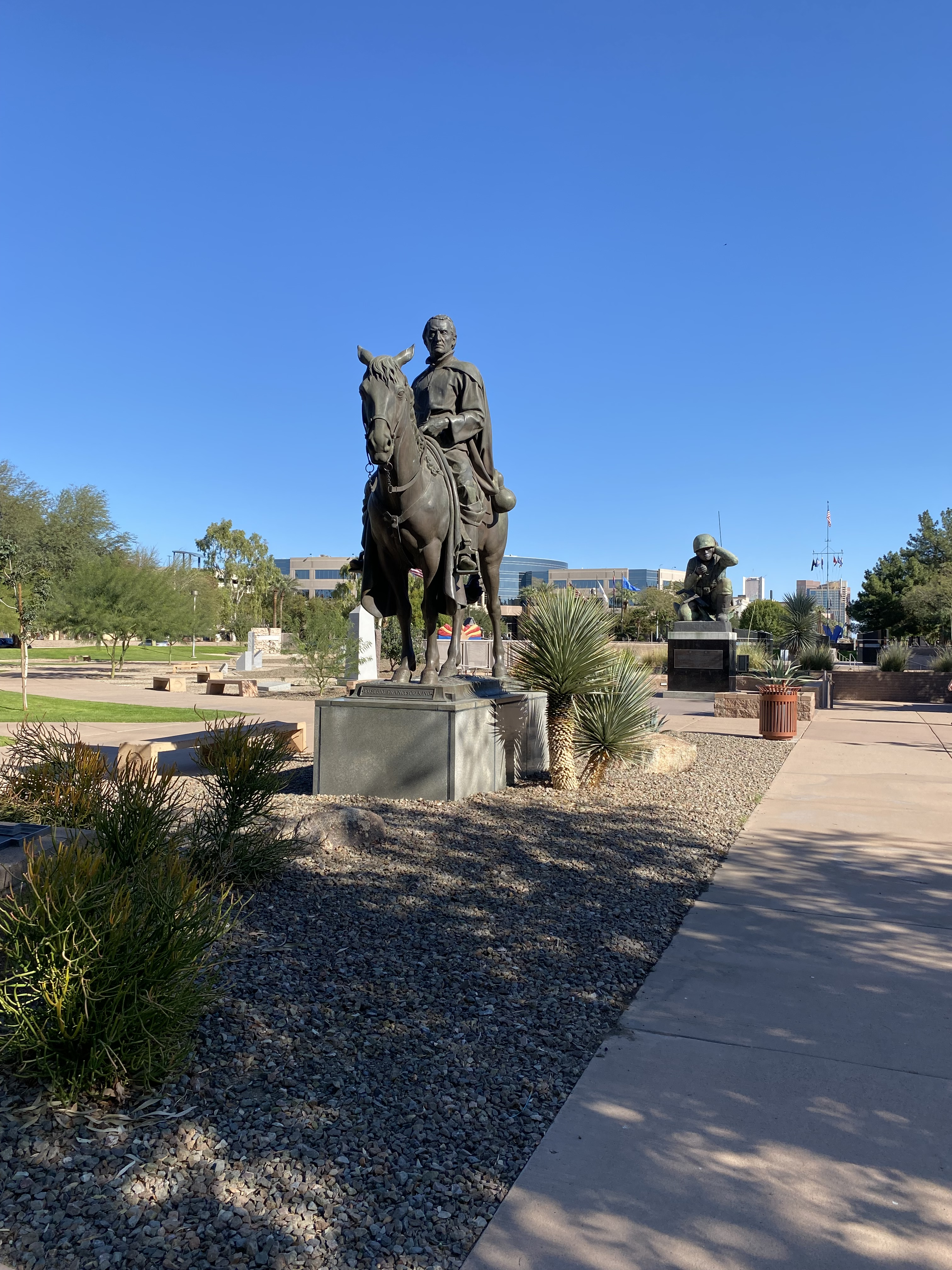
Equestrian statue of Father Kino in front of the Arizona State Capitol in Phoenix, Arizona

Kino has been honored both in Mexico and the United States, with various towns, streets, schools, monuments, and geographic features named after him. The copper silicate mineral Kinoite is named in his honor. In 1863, Hans Hermann Behr named the Quino checkerspot, a butterfly, for him. In 1965, a statue of Kino sculpted by artist Susanne Silvercruys was donated to the United States Capitol's National Statuary Hall collection, one of two statues representing Arizona. A copy of this statue has been in place in front of the Arizona History Museum in Tucson, Arizona since the 1970s. Another statue (sculpted by artist Julián Martínez Soto) of him stands above Kino Parkway, a major thoroughfare in Tucson. An equestrian statue featuring Kino, donated in 1967 by the Mexican state of Sonora, stands in Wesley Bolin Memorial Plaza across from the Arizona State Capitol in Phoenix. A time capsule is encapsuled in the base. Another equestrian statue also sculpted by artist Julian Martinez Soto stands next to the Cathedral in the city of Hermosillo, Sonora, México. The towns of Bahía Kino, and Magdalena de Kino in Sonora and Ejido Padre Kino in Baja California are named in his honor. A park with a statue of Kino resides in the city of Nogales, AZ. The largest statue of Kino is located along the US–Mexico border in Tijuana, Baja California. Also a wine is named after him (Padre Kino), produced by Pernod Ricard Mexico in Hermosillo, Sonora. In 2009, Mexican and American Jesuit provinces and Catholic dioceses, the Jesuit Refugee Service, and the Missionary Sisters of the Eucharist, founded the Kino Border Initiative, a binational migrant service and advocacy organization in Nogales, Arizona and Nogales, Sonora named in his honor. A monument to Kino was erected in 2015 in the garden of Piazza Dante, just outside the historic center of Trento, Italy. In 1990, a monument to Kino by Julian Martinez Soto was erected in Segno, Liguria, Italy.

In 1963, he was inducted into the Hall of Great Westerners of the National Cowboy & Western Heritage Museum in Oklahoma City.

=== Beatification process ===
On 11 July 2020, Pope Francis advanced the cause of Kino's sainthood by recognizing his life of heroic virtue, and declaring him Venerable.

== Missions and visitas founded ==
After the first voyage of Christopher Columbus, the Catholic Church awarded to the Spanish Crown the lands of "New Spain." This grant was with the directive that the Crown would underwrite the efforts to convert the pagan inhabitants to Catholicism. The lands included the Caribbean, Mexico, and portions of what is now the Southwestern United States.

In its new lands, the Spanish Crown employed three major agencies to extend its borders and consolidate its colonial presence: the presidio (royal fort), pueblo (town), and the misión (mission). In addition, there were asistencias (sub-missions or contributing chapels) which were small-scale missions that regularly conducted Divine service on days of obligation, but lacked a resident priest. Visitas (visiting chapels or country chapels) also lacked a resident priest, and were often attended only sporadically. These different types of settlements were established such that each of the installations was no more than a long day's ride by horse or boat (or three days on foot) from one another.

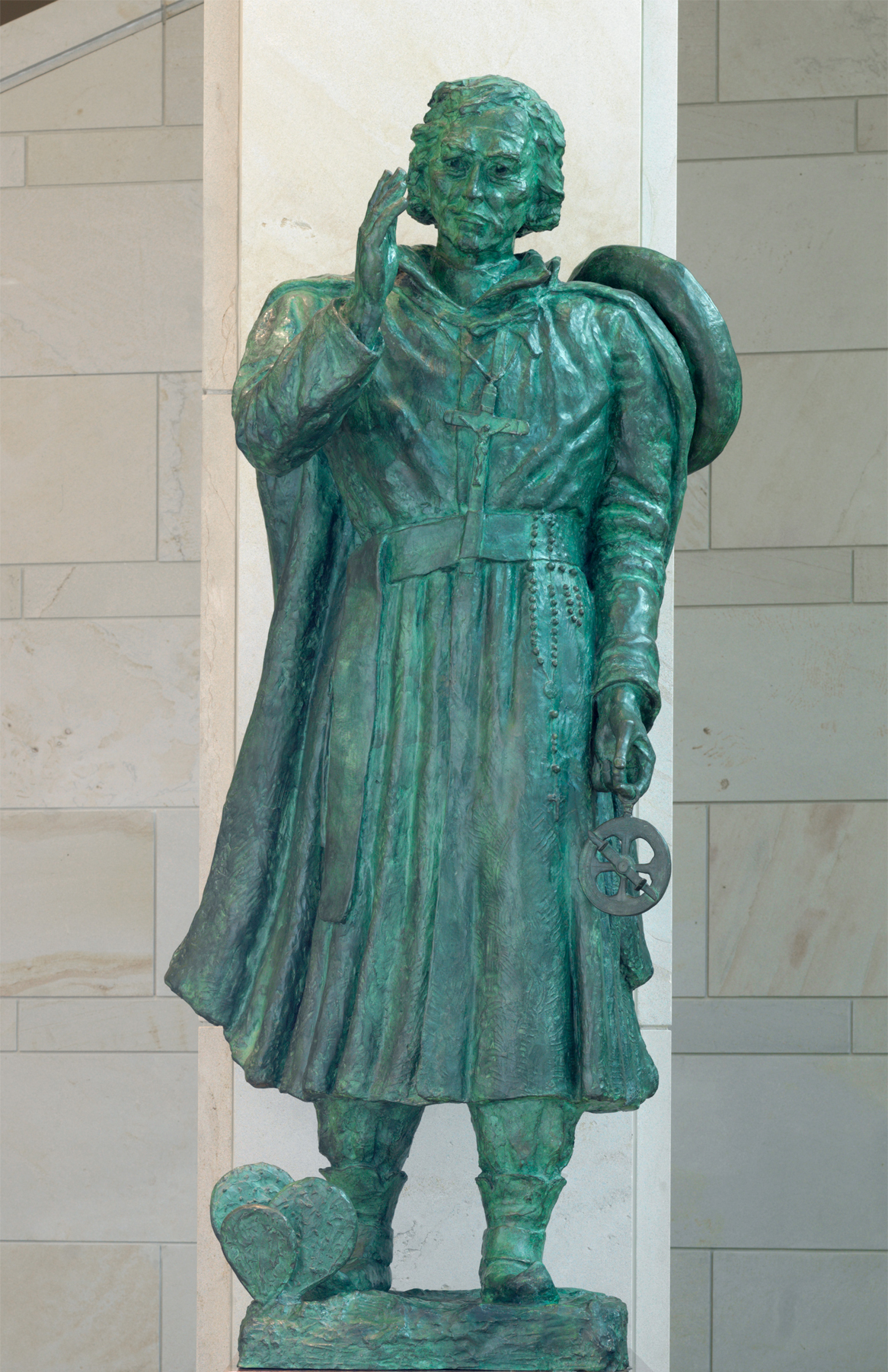
Bronze sculpture by Suzanne Silvercruys

Each type of frontier station needed to be self-supporting, because supply lines (roads) were non-existent. There was no way to maintain a village from outside sources. To sustain a mission settlement, the Fathers needed either Spanish colonists or converted natives to cultivate crops and tend livestock in the volume needed to support a fair-sized Church establishment. Scarcity of imported materials and lack of skilled laborers compelled the Fathers to employ simple building materials and methods.

Although the Spanish hierarchy considered the missions temporary ventures, individual settlement development was not based simply on a priestly whim. The founding of a mission followed long-standing rules and procedures. The paperwork involved required months, sometimes years of correspondence, and demanded the attention of virtually every level of the Spanish bureaucracy.

Once empowered to erect a mission in a given area, the men assigned to it chose a specific site that featured a good water supply, plenty of wood for fires and building material, and ample fields for grazing herds and raising crops. The Fathers blessed the site, and with the aid of their military escort fashioned temporary shelters out of tree limbs roofed with thatch, reeds, or in Pimería Alta saguaro ribs or ocotillo branches topped with brush and mud. These simple huts would ultimately give way to the stone and adobe buildings that exist today.

The majority of structures, indeed whole villages, were oriented on a roughly east–west axis to take the best advantage of the sun's position for interior illumination; the exact alignment depended on the geographic features of the particular site. Directives from Spain clearly stated that villages were to be sited on the west side of any valley so that the sun would shine in the homes first thing in the morning, discouraging slothful behavior on the part of the inhabitants.

When founding a mission compound, first the spot for the church itself was selected, its position marked and then the remainder of the mission complex would be laid out. Workshops, kitchens, living quarters, storerooms, and other ancillary chambers were usually grouped in a quadrangle, inside which religious celebrations and other festive events could take place.

=== List of missions ===
This listing of the sites founded by Kino is not complete. Also, since names have changed over time, there appears to be some duplication. They are:

- Nuestra Señora de Guadalupe located near present-day La Paz, Baja California, was founded in April 1683 and abandoned four months later. Kino wrote in his astronomical treatise on comets that he dedicated his missionary life to Our Lady of Guadalupe. Kino, as the King's cartographer and surveyor, led together with Admiral Atondo the attempt to colonize the Baja California peninsula of the Las Californias Province of New Spain.
- Mission San Bruno: founded October 1683 In September 1685, after a prolonged drought there, Kino and the colonists were forced to abandon the mission.
- Mission Nuestra Señora de los Dolores: founded on 13 March 1687. This was the first Pimería Alta mission founded by Father Kino. By 1744, the mission was abandoned.
- Mission Nuestra Señora de los Remedios de Doagibubig was founded in 1687 and was abandoned by 1730. Nothing remains of this mission.
- Mission Nuestro Padre de San Ignacio de Cabórica was founded in 1687 and is located in San Ignacio, Sonora.
- Mission San Pedro y San Pablo del Tubutama was founded in 1687, in Tubutama, Sonora.
- Mission Santa Teresa de Atil was founded in 1687, in the small town of Atil, Sonora.
- Mission Santa María Magdalena was founded in 1687, located in Magdalena de Kino, Sonora. Kino's grave is located here.
- Mission San José de Imuris was founded in 1687, in Imuris, Sonora.
- Mission Nuestra Señora del Pilar y Santiago de Cocóspera was founded in 1689. It is located in Cocóspera, Sonora.
- Mission San Antonio Paduano del Oquitoa was founded in 1689. It is located in Oquitoa, Sonora.
- Mission San Diego del Pitiquito was founded in 1689. It is located in Pitiquito, Sonora.
- Mission San Luis Bacoancos was founded in 1691, but was soon abandoned after Apache attacks.
- Mission San Cayetano del Tumacácori was founded in 1691 at a native Sobaipuri settlement. This was southern Arizona's first mission and Arizona's first Jesuit mission. Later a chapel was built. (San Cayetano de Calabasas was established in a different location much later, after Kino's time.) Sometime after the 1751 Pima Revolt the settlement and mission were moved to the opposite side of the river and became San José de Tumacácori.
- Mission San José de Tumacácori, the presently known location that is a National Historic Park. The farming land around the mission was sold at auction in 1834 and the mission was abandoned by 1840. It is now a National Monument in Tumacácori National Historical Park in Southern Arizona.
- La Misión de San Gabriel de Guevavi was founded in 1691. It became a cabecera or head mission in 1701 with the establishment of what Kino described affectionately as a "neat little house and church." Through the years its name changed many times so that now it is known by the generic name referencing many saints: Mission Los Santos Ángeles de Guevavi. The chapel was initially established in a native settlement, but then was destroyed by fire, probably during an indigenous uprising. The church rebuilt in new locations twice, the final and largest one being built in 1751. Its ruins are part of Tumacácori National Historical Park.
- Mission San Lázaro was founded in 1691, but was soon abandoned after Apache attacks.
- Mission San Xavier del Bac (O'odham [Sobaipuri-O'odham]: Wa:k), 16 mi south of Tucson, Arizona, founded as a missionary location in 1692. The present building, located 1 mi from the original Kino-period location, dates from 1785. The interior is richly decorated with ornaments showing a mixture of New Spain and Native American artistic motifs. It is still used by Tohono O'odham Nation members (Wa:k community members especially) and Yaqui tribal members.
- Mission San Cosme y Damián de Tucsón: founded 1692
- Mission San Ignacio de Sonoitac: a rancheria near Tumacacori, founded 1692.
- Mission San Martín de Aribac: a rancheria 25 miles west of Tumacacori, founded before 1695
- Mission La Purísima Concepción de Nuestra Señora de Caborca: founded 1693
- Mission Santa María Suamca: founded 1693
- Mission San Valentin del Bizani: founded 1693
- Mission Nuestra Señora de Loreto y San Marcelo de Sonoyta: founded 1693
- Mission Nuestra Señora de la Ascención de Opodepe: founded 1704

== Movies ==
- Father Kino, Padre on Horseback (or Mission to Glory: A True Story) starring Richard Egan as Kino, was made in 1977. The movie is available in DVD format.
- Kino: La leyenda de Padre Negro (Kino: The Legend of the Black Robe Priest) starring Enrique Rocha as Kino, was made in 1993 and was awarded the Mexican Academy of Film's Ariel award for best original score. The movie is available in DVD format.
- Through the Wilderness on Horseback – Scientist and Missionary: The Life of Eusebio Kino, S.J. (Fr. Christof Wolf SJ, Loyola Productions Munich, 2011)

== Literature ==
- In John Steinbeck's novel, The Pearl, the protagonist is named after the missionary. It is likely this was to emphasize the long lasting cultural impact of European colonization.
- In Philip Caputo's 2017 novel Some Rise by Sin, there is a statue to Father Kino in a Mexican churchyard. The main character, an American missionary, reflects on Kino's life in the context of the Mexican drug wars and the present state of the Catholic Church.
- In Don Rosa's Scrooge McDuck adventure The Dutchman's Secret (1999), Father Kino (referred to as Eusebio Francesco Chino) is the builder of what would have become the famed Lost Dutchman's Gold Mine.

== Namesake organizations ==
- Kino Border Initiative, concerned with US–Mexico border and immigration policies
- Kino Historical Society, maintains an electronic library on its website about Kino's life and legacy.
- Cultural Association of Padre Eusebio F. Chini (Kino), an organization in Italy
- Fundación Kino, an organization in Mexico
- Kino Catechetical Institute in the Diocese of Phoenix
