= 2nd federal electoral district of Sonora =

Federal electoral district of Mexico

Sonora's 2nd
- Electoral district of the Chamber of Deputies of Mexico

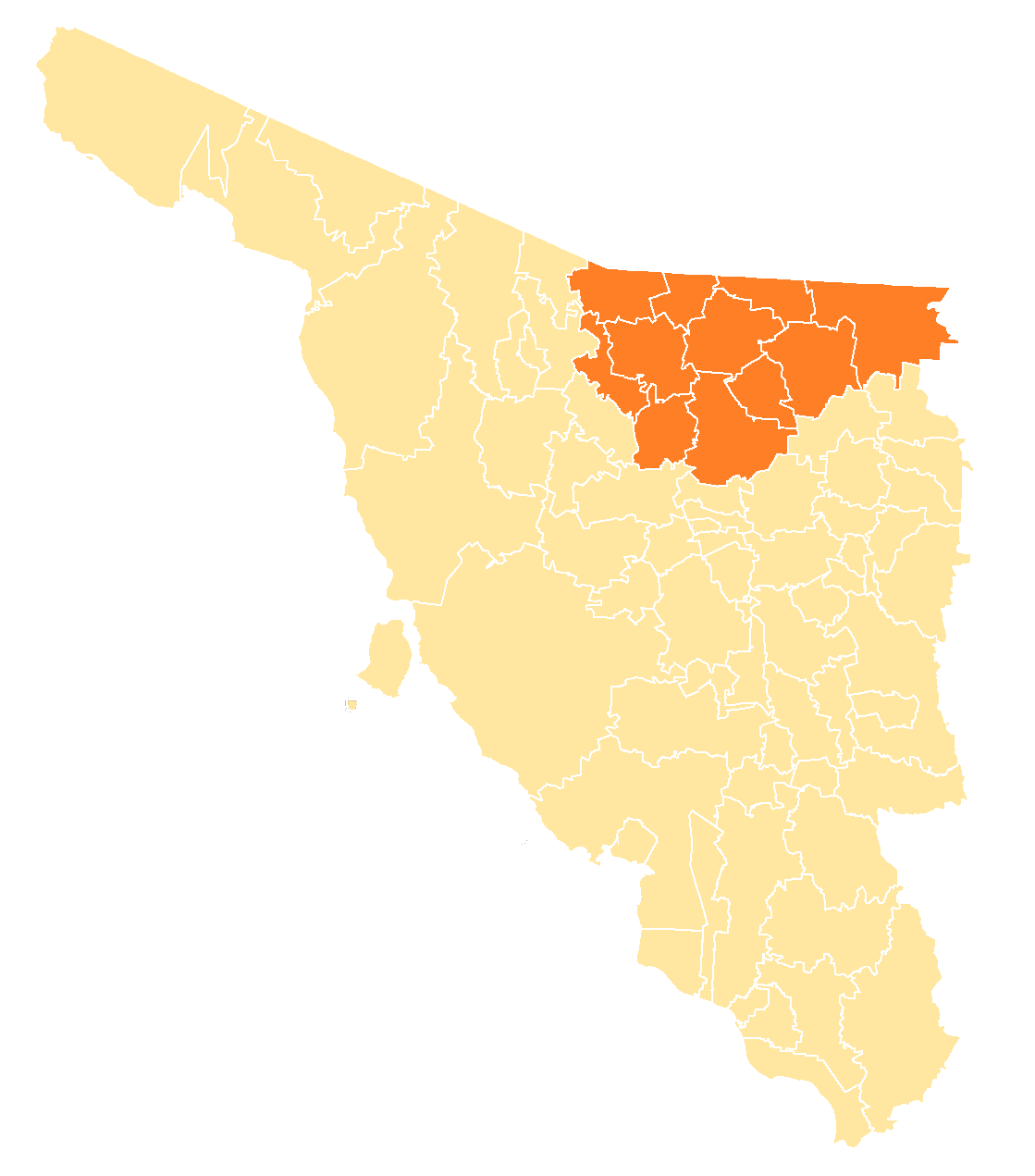
- 2nd district since 2005

Incumbent
- Member: Jesús Antonio Pujol
- Party: ▌Morena
- Congress: 66th (2024–2027)

District
- State: Sonora
- Head town: Nogales
- Coordinates: 31°18′N 110°56′W
- Covers: 11 municipalities: Agua Prieta, Arizpe, Bacoachi, Cananea, Cucurpe, Fronteras, Ímuris, Magdalena, Naco, Nogales, Santa Cruz
- PR region: First
- Precincts: 227
- Population: 463,504 (2020 census)

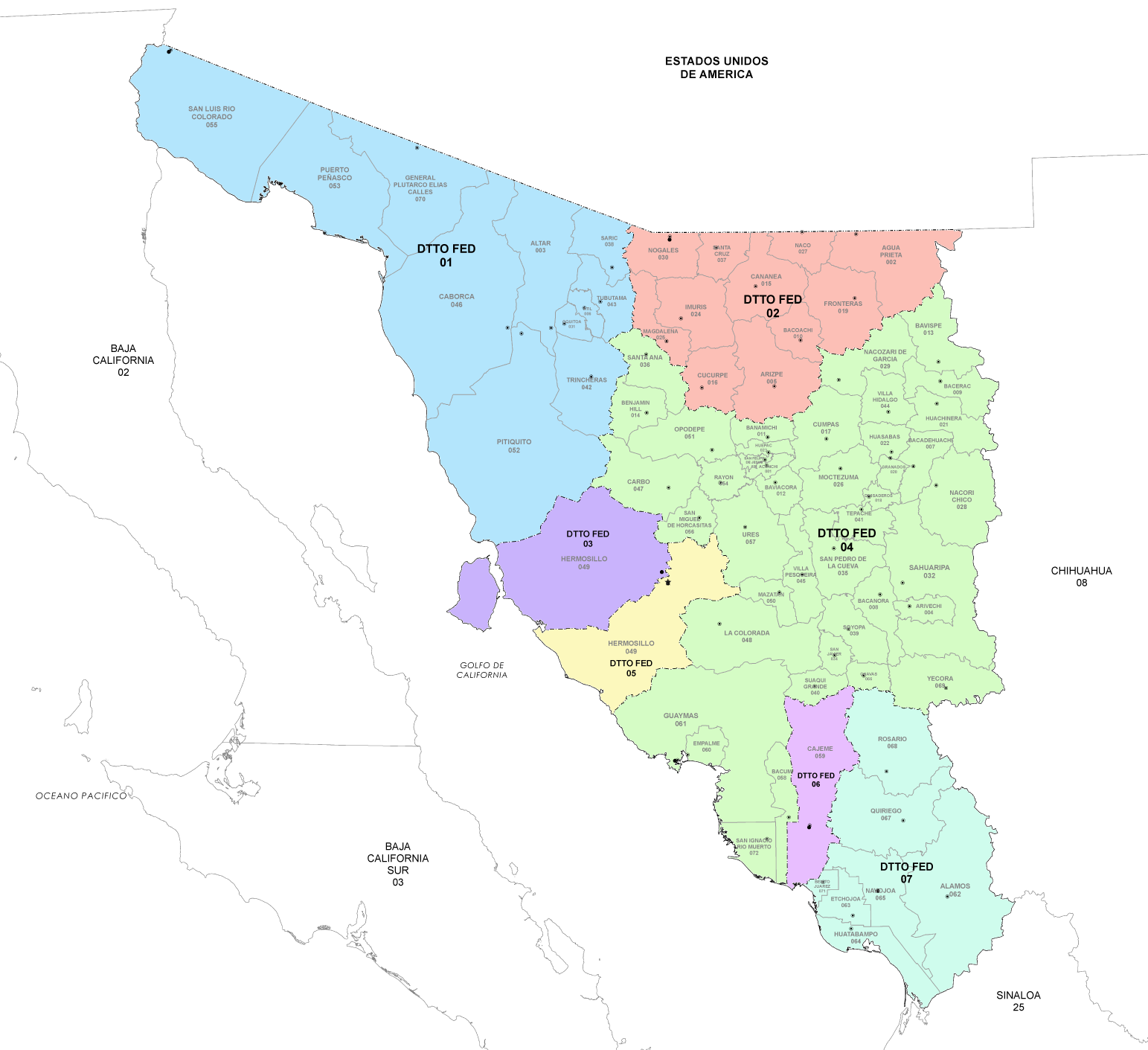
Federal electoral districts of Sonora since 2023

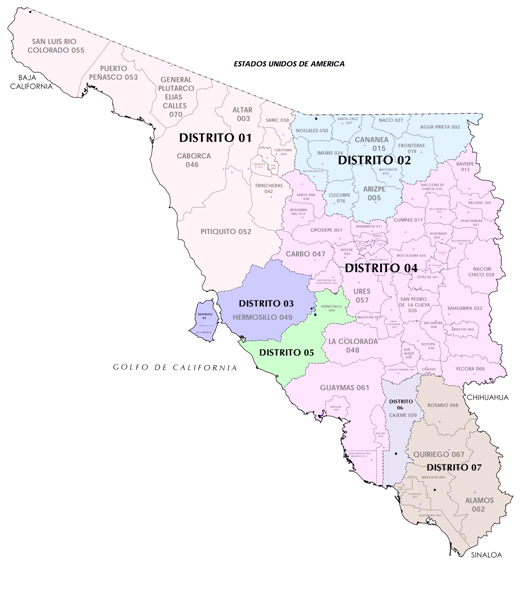
Sonora under the 2017–2022 districting plan

The 2nd federal electoral district of Sonora (Spanish: Distrito electoral federal 02 de Sonora) is one of the 300 electoral districts into which Mexico is divided for elections to the federal Chamber of Deputies and one of seven such districts in the state of Sonora.

It elects one deputy to the lower house of Congress for each three-year legislative session by means of the first-past-the-post system. Votes cast in the district also count towards the calculation of proportional representation ("plurinominal") deputies elected from the first region.

The current member for the district, elected in the 2024 general election, is Jesús Antonio Pujol Irastorza of the National Regeneration Movement (Morena).

== District territory ==
Under the 2023 districting plan adopted by the National Electoral Institute (INE), which is to be used for the 2024, 2027 and 2030 federal elections, the 2nd district comprises 227 electoral precincts (secciones electorales) across 11 municipalities in the north-eastern part of the state:

- Agua Prieta, Arizpe, Bacoachi, Cananea, Cucurpe, Fronteras, Ímuris, Magdalena, Naco, Nogales and Santa Cruz.

The head town (cabecera distrital), where results from individual polling stations are gathered together and tallied, is the border city of Nogales. The district reported a population of 463,504 in the 2020 census.

== Previous districting schemes ==
Evolution of electoral district numbers
	1974	1978	1996	2005	2017	2023
Sonora	4	7	7	7	7	7
Chamber of Deputies	196	300				

2017–2022

Between 2017 and 2022, the district had the same configuration as at present.

2005–2017

Under the 2005 plan, the district had the same configuration as in 2023 and 2017.

1996–2005

Under the 1996 districting plan, the head town was at Magdalena de Kino and the district covered 30 of the state's northern municipalities.

1978–1996

The districting scheme in force from 1978 to 1996 was the result of the 1977 electoral reforms, which increased the number of single-member seats in the Chamber of Deputies from 196 to 300. Under that plan, Sonora's seat allocation rose from four to seven. The 2nd district had its head town at the state capital, Hermosillo, and it covered a part of that city.

== Deputies returned to Congress ==
(Mexico) National parties
- Current
- PAN
- PRI
- PT
- PVEM
- MC
- Morena
- PAZ
- Somos
- Defunct or local only
- PLM
- PNR
- PRM
- PNM
- PP
- PPS
- PARM
- PFCRN
- CON
- PANAL
- PSD
- PES
- PES
- PRD

Sonora's 2nd district
Election	Deputy	Party	Term	Legislature
1916	Flavio A. Bórquez		1916–1917	Constituent Congress of Querétaro
1917	Carlos Plank		1917	27th Congress
1918	Gustavo Padrés		1918–1919	28th Congress
1920	Juan de Dios Bojórquez		1920–1921	29th Congress
1922	Julián González		1922–1924	30th Congress
1924	Agustín Rodríguez		1924–1926	31st Congress
1926	Jesús Lizárraga		1926–1928	32nd Congress
1928	Alfredo Iruretagoyena		1928–1930	33rd Congress
1930	Emiliano Corella	Institutional Revolutionary Party	1930–1932	34th Congress
1932	Andrés Peralta	Institutional Revolutionary Party	1932–1934	35th Congress
1934	Francisco Martínez	Institutional Revolutionary Party	1934–1940	37th Congress
1940	Ramón Durón	Institutional Revolutionary Party	1940–1943	38th Congress
1943	Herminio Ahumada	Institutional Revolutionary Party	1943–1946	39th Congress
1946	Jesús María Suárez	Institutional Revolutionary Party	1946–1949	40th Congress
1949	Ignacio Pesqueira	Popular Socialist Party (Mexico)	1949–1952	41st Congress
1952	Jesús María Suárez Arvizu	Institutional Revolutionary Party	1952–1955	42nd Congress
1955	Emiliano Corella Molina	Institutional Revolutionary Party	1955–1958	43rd Congress
1958	Benito Bernal Domínguez	Institutional Revolutionary Party	1958–1961	44th Congress
1961	Alicia Arellano Tapia	Institutional Revolutionary Party	1961–1964	45th Congress
1964	Faustino Serna Félix	Institutional Revolutionary Party	1964–1967	46th Congress
1967	Guillermo Núñez Keith	Institutional Revolutionary Party	1967–1970	47th Congress
1970	Enrique Fox Romero	Institutional Revolutionary Party	1970–1973	48th Congress
1973	Alejandro Sobarzo Loaiza	Institutional Revolutionary Party	1973–1976	49th Congress
1976	César Augusto Tapia Quijada	Institutional Revolutionary Party	1976–1979	50th Congress
1979	Alejandro Sobarzo Loaiza	Institutional Revolutionary Party	1979–1982	51st Congress
1982	Alfonso Molina Ruibal	Institutional Revolutionary Party	1982–1985	52nd Congress
1985	Cristóbal Benjamín Figueroa Nicola	National Action Party (Mexico)	1985–1988	53rd Congress
1988	Francisco Javier Pavlovich Robles	National Action Party (Mexico)	1988–1991	54th Congress
1991	Ovidio Pereyra García	Institutional Revolutionary Party	1991–1994	55th Congress
1994	Luz de Jesús Salazar Pérez	National Action Party (Mexico)	1994–1997	56th Congress
1997	Héctor Mayer Soto	Institutional Revolutionary Party	1997–2000	57th Congress
2000	Guillermo Padrés Elías	National Action Party (Mexico)	2000–2003	58th Congress
2003	Fermín Trujillo Fuentes	Institutional Revolutionary Party	2003–2006	59th Congress
2006	Carlos Alberto Navarro Sugich	National Action Party (Mexico)	2006–2009	60th Congress
2009	Miguel Ernesto Pompa Corella	Institutional Revolutionary Party	2009–2012	61st Congress
2012	David Cuauhtémoc Galindo Delgado	National Action Party (Mexico)	2012–2015	62nd Congress
2015	Leticia Amparano Gámez	National Action Party (Mexico)	2015–2018	63rd Congress
2018	Ana Gabriela Guevara; Ana Bernal Camarena		2018; 2018–2021	64th Congress
2021	Ana Bernal Camarena	Labour Party (Mexico)	2021–2024	65th Congress
2024	Jesús Antonio Pujol Irastorza	National Regeneration Movement	2024–2027	66th Congress

== Presidential elections ==
Sonora's 2nd district
Election	District won by	Party or coalition	%
2018	Andrés Manuel López Obrador	Juntos Haremos Historia	55.8784
2024	Claudia Sheinbaum Pardo	Sigamos Haciendo Historia	64.5038
