= Cananea Municipality =

Cananea
- Municipality
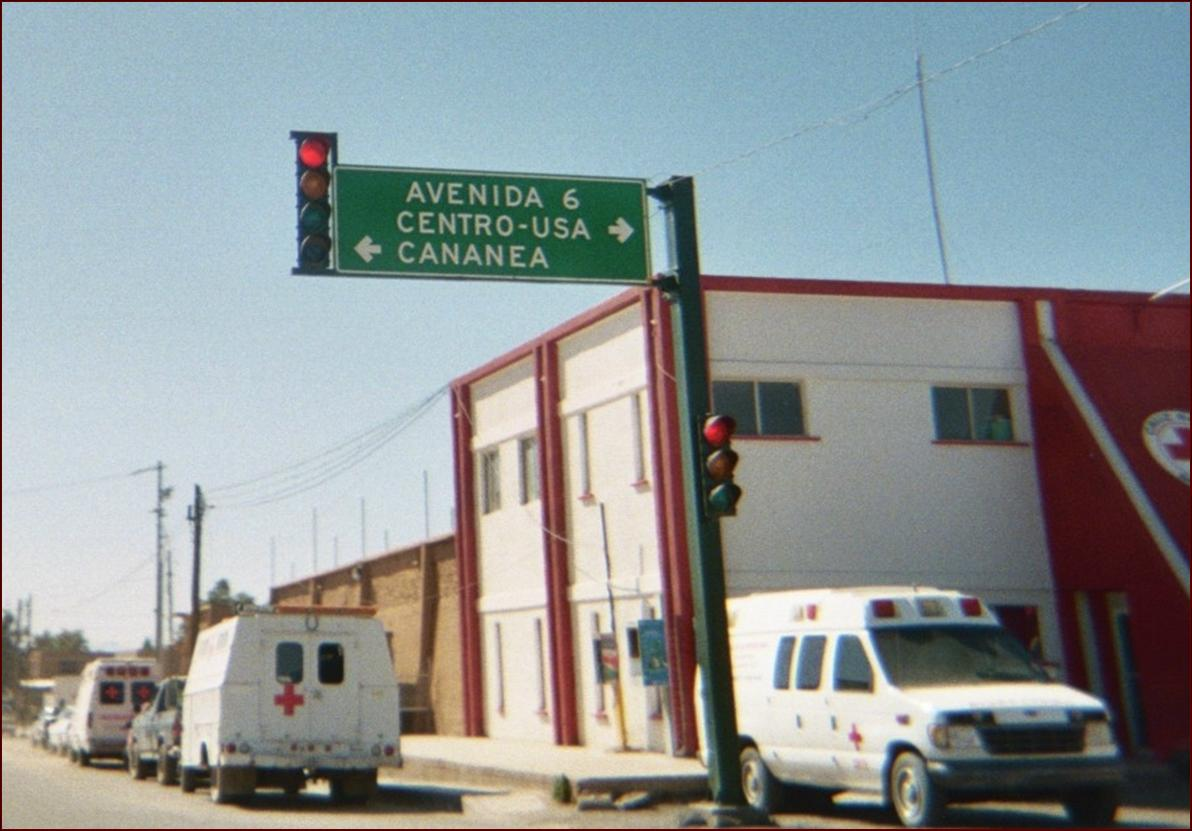
- Highway sign pointing to Cananea

- Coat of arms

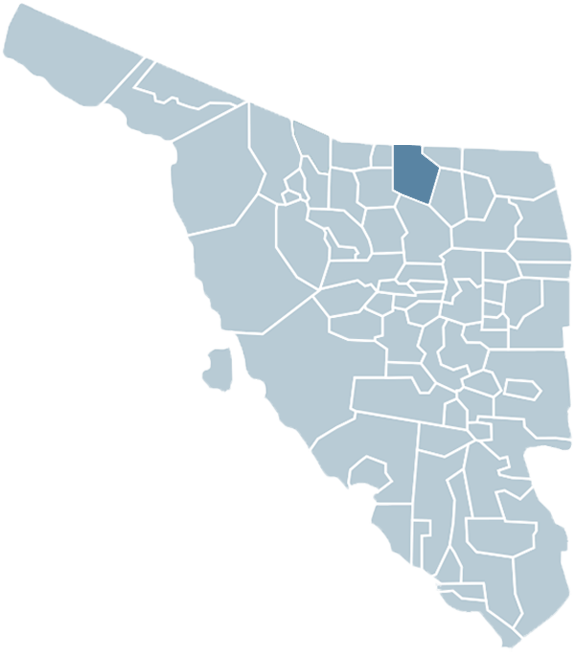
- Municipality of Cananea in Sonora

- City of Cananea
- Coordinates: 30°57′N 110°18′W
- Country: Mexico
- State: Sonora
- Municipal seat: Cananea
- European arrival: 1760
- Municipality created: 8 November 1901

Government
  - Municipal president of Cananea: Esmeralda Gonzalez Tapia (MORENA)

Area
  - Total: 4,414.1 km^{2} (1,704.3 sq mi)
- Elevation (average): 1,500 m (4,900 ft)

Population (2020)
  - Total: 39,451
  - Density: 17.06/km^{2} (44.2/sq mi)
- Time zone: UTC–07:00 (Zona Pacífico)
- Postal code: 84620
- Area code: +52 645
- Demonym: Cananense
- Website: http://www.cananea.gob.mx

Cananea is a municipality in the northern portion of the Mexican state of Sonora, on the U.S. border. Its municipal seat is the city of Cananea, located at 30°58′55″N 110°18′02″W.

== Population ==
The population of the municipality of Cananea was 35,892. Most of the population lives in the municipal seat, which had 31,560 inhabitants. This represented over 95.8% of the total.

- Population in 1980: 25,327
- Population in 1990: 26,931
- Population in 2000: 32,061
- Population in 2010: 32,936

=== Towns and villages ===
The largest localities (cities, towns, and villages) are:

Name	2010 Census Population
Cananea	31,560
Cultaca	424
Ignacio Zaragoza (La Mesa)	266
Vicente Guerrero	217
Emiliano Zapata	155
José María Morelos y Pavón (Sauceda)	116
Total Municipality	32,936

== History ==
The territory now occupied by the municipality was originally a rancheria inhabited by the Pima Indians, who had been pacified by the Spanish in the seventeenth century.

According to local information, the word Cananea comes from two Apache words: “can” which means "meat" and “efa” which means "horse".

The colonial development of Cananea was influenced by the nearby missions of Arizpe, Santa María and Cocóspera. In the middle of the nineteenth century Cananea became part of the province of Sonora, becoming a "real de minas". On 8 November 1901, Cananea was raised to municipal status, after having been part of the municipality of Fronteras.

In 1906 the site was stage to perhaps the most famous strike in Mexican history, the "huelga de Cananea". This strike was against the American owned mining company and was put down by forces brought across the border from the United States with considerable loss of life on the part of the striking miners. This strike is considered to be one of the precursors to the Mexican Revolution of 1910.

Cananea became a municipality in 1901. In 1937 the territory of Naco separated and it became municipality of Naco. On 31 October 2001, the city of Cananea temporarily became the capital of the state of Sonora during the celebrations of the 100th anniversary of the municipality.

== Geography ==
This municipio borders Cochise County, Arizona, in the United States to the north, and the municipalities of Arizpe (south), Naco and Bacoachi (east) and Ímuris and Santa Cruz (west). Its total area is 4,414.1 square kilometers and its average elevation is 1,500 meters above sea level.

In addition to the municipal seat there are several small communities: ejido Morelos, Emiliano Zapata, Zaragoza and Vicente.

Cananea has a relatively high altitude. The most important mountain peaks are Manzanal, Los Ajos, Cananeita, Magallanes, Azul and la Mariquita (2,480 m), which is the site of the Guillermo Haro Observatory, an astronomical observatory of the National Autonomous University of Mexico (UNAM).

The most important rivers are: Sonora, Bacanuchi and San Pedro; other streams are: Jaralito, Río Claro, Santa Bárbara, Los Difuntos, El Sauz, El Berrendo, El Álamo, Villa Verde, El Chiflón, Cuitaca, Cocóspera, El Anillo and San Antonio.

There were 34 wells (2000), of which 20 were for irrigation, 11 for water supply for the Compañía Minera de Cananea, and four for drinking water for Cananea and ejido Zaragoza.

The climate is semihot subhumid with an average monthly maximum temperature of 23.5 °C in the months of June to September and an average monthly minimum temperature of 7.4 °C in December and January; the average annual temperature is 15.3 °C.

The vegetation is pasture in almost all of the area, while there are still stands of oak pine in the higher elevations. The areas that can be irrigated are scarce.

=== Adjacent municipalities and counties ===
- Naco Municipality - northeast
- Fronteras Municipality - east
- Bacoachi Municipality - southeast
- Arizpe Municipality - south
- Ímuris Municipality - southwest
- Santa Cruz Municipality - northwest
- Cochise County, Arizona - north

== Economy ==
Mining is still very important, with the Buenavista mine adjacent to the municipal seat. Cattle raising is also widely practiced. The main agricultural products are corn, beans, barley, sorghum, alfalfa, and apples.

In the municipal seat there are manufacturing companies that operate under the system called maquila, assembling products for re-export to the United States.
