= Fermín Trujillo Fuentes =

Mexican politician

Deputy of the Congress of Sonora from the 18th district
- Incumbent
- Assumed office 14 June 2015

Federal deputy from Sonora's 2nd district
- In office 1 September 2003 – 31 August 2006
- Preceded by: Guillermo Padrés Elías
- Succeeded by: Carlos Alberto Navarro Sugich

Personal details
- Born: 18 September 1966 (age 59) Guadalupe de Ures, Sonora, Mexico
- Party: PRI (1985–2008); PANAL (2008–present)
- Occupation: Politician

Fermín Trujillo Fuentes (born 18 September 1966) is a Mexican politician affiliated with the New Alliance Party (formerly to the Institutional Revolutionary Party). He served as Deputy of the LIX Legislature of the Mexican Congress representing Sonora and as Senator of the LX Legislature as replacement of Alfonso Elías Serrano.

Trujillo has served as a local deputy in the Congress of Sonora since 2015.

== Early life ==
Trujillo was born on 18 September 1966 in Ures municipality, Sonora, to Manuel Trujillo and Amada Fuentes. He received his Licentiate in education at the Higher Normal School of Hermosillo before earning a master's degree in pedagogy from the Higher School of Nayarit. Trujillo taught at the primary and secondary levels in Sonora for over 10 years.

In 2000, Trujillo was named the secretary-general of Section 54 of the Sindicato Nacional de Trabajadores de la Educación (SNTE), the national teachers' union, and served in the position for three years.

== Career ==
In 2003, Trujillo was elected as a federal deputy of the LIX Legislature of Congress for Sonora's 2nd district. He then served as a substitute Senator for Guillermo Padrés Elías in the LX Legislature, assuming the post after Padrés Elías announced his gubernatorial candidacy in 2008. He the then served as a substitute Senator for Alfonso Elías Serrano in the LXI Legislature from 2009 to 2012.

After his time in national politics, Trujillo was designated to the Congress of Sonora via proportional representation in the 2015 Sonora elections. In 2018, he won a seat representing the 18th district in the Congress of Sonora, which encompasses 38 municipalities and is seated in Santa Ana. Trujillo became the first person to serve three consecutive terms in the body by winning re-election to his seat with 44.8 percent of the vote in 2021.
