= Arizpe Municipality =

Coordinates: 30.3167°N 110.1667°W

Arizpe
- Municipality
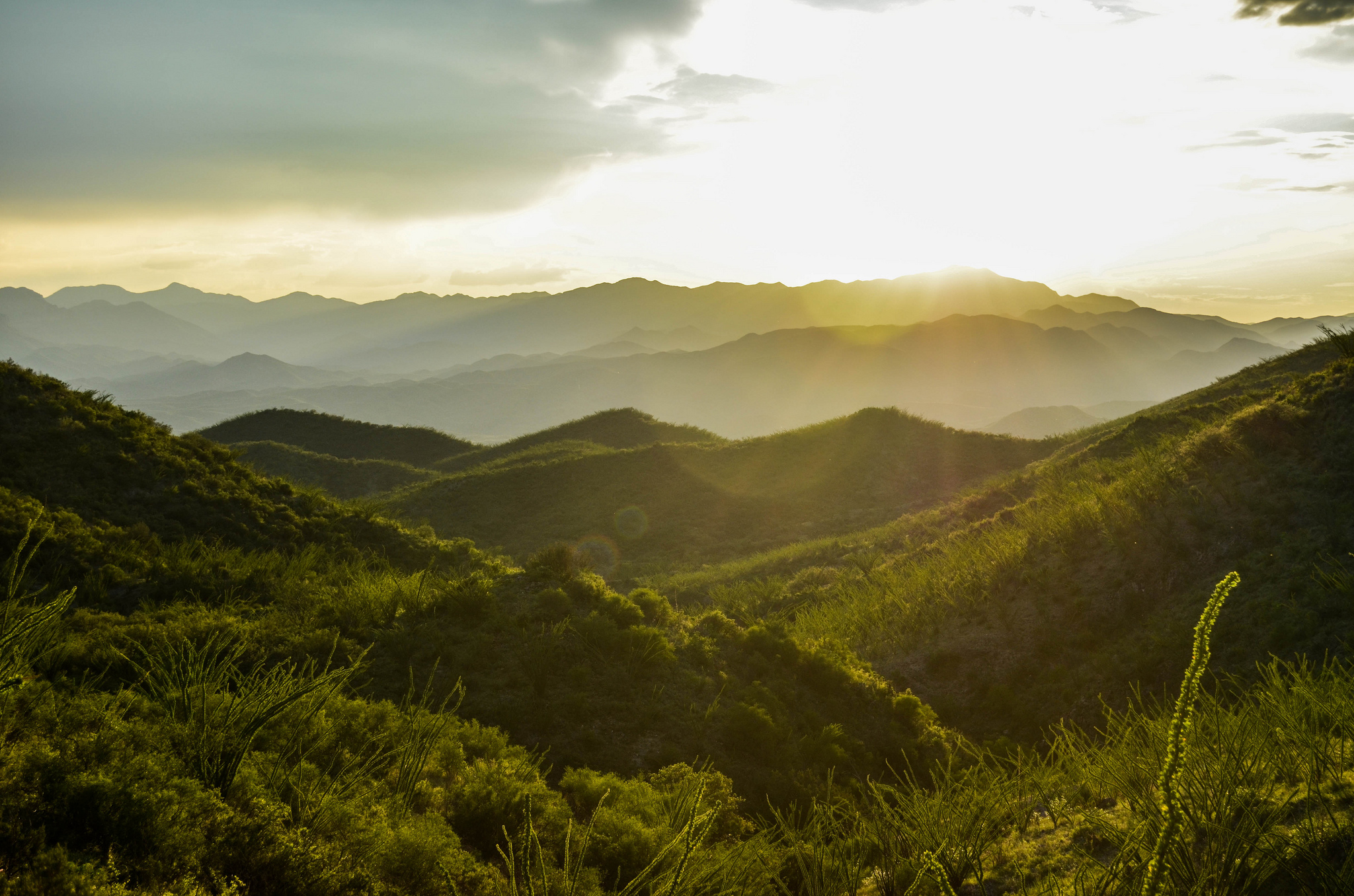
- Western Sierra Madre Mountains, Arizpe, Sonora

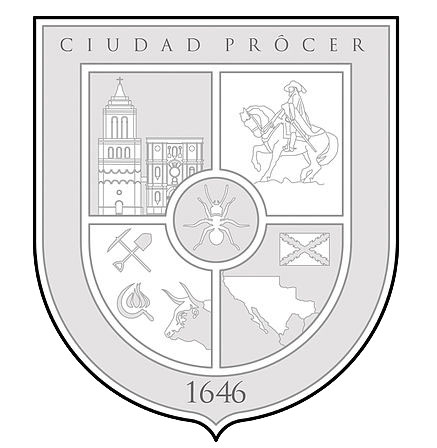
- Coat of arms

- Location of the municipality in Sonora
- Country: Mexico
- State: Sonora
- Municipal seat: Arizpe

Government
  - Municipal president: Alma Isela Medina Maldonado; Morena
- Time zone: UTC-7 (Zona Pacífico)

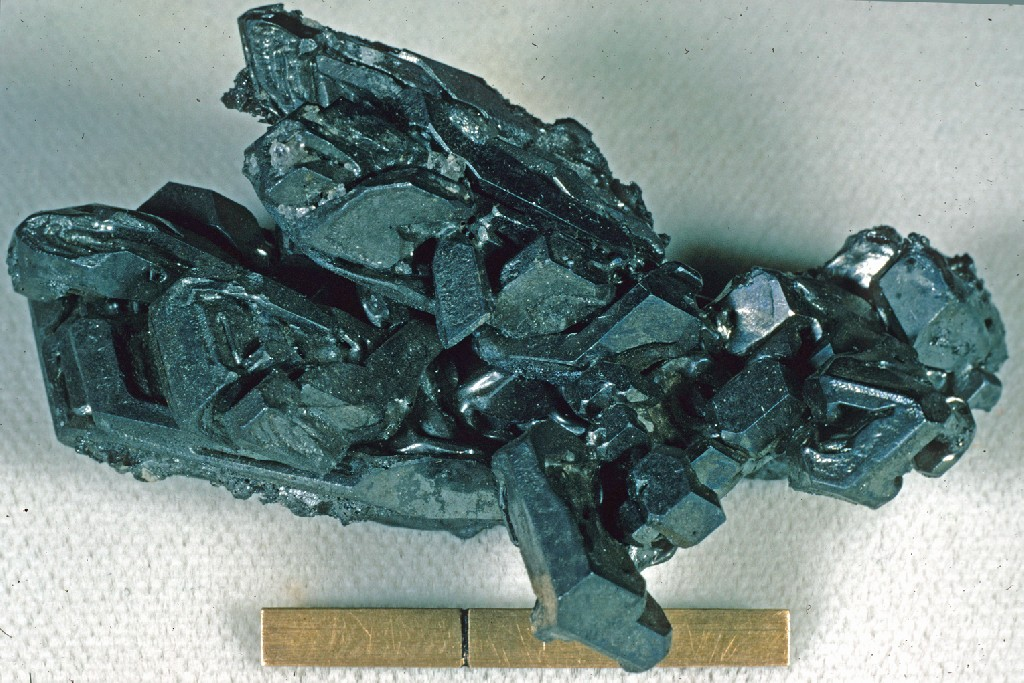
Acanthite from a silver mine in the municipality of Arizpe

Arizpe is a municipality in the state of Sonora in north-western Mexico. The municipality of Arizpe is one of the 72 municipalities of the state of Sonora, located in the north-central region of the state in the Sierra Madre Occidental area. It has 72 localities within the municipality, its municipal seat and the most populated locality is the homonymous town of Arizpe, while other important ones are: Sinoquipe, Bacanuchi and Chinapa. It was named for the first time as a municipality in 1813 and according to the 14th Population and Housing Census carried out in 2020 by the National Institute of Statistics and Geography (INEGI) the municipality has a total population of 2,788 inhabitants. This municipality has an area of 1,186.56 square miles (3,073.17 km^{2}). Its Gross Domestic Product per capita is USD 11,012, and its Human Development Index (HDI) is 0.8292.

Like most of the municipalities of Sonora, the name was given by that of its municipal seat. The region was inhabited by the Opata people. The name Arizpe is derived from the roots of the Opata language Arit, "brave ant" and Pa, "in"; that is, "Place of brave ants or red ants".

== History as a municipality ==
The region that today comprises this municipality was inhabited by the Opata people, before the arrival of the Spanish conquistadors. It was in 1646 when the Jesuit missionaries Jerónimo de la Canal and Ignacio Molarja founded the town of Arizpe with the category of "Mission Town" while evangelizing the above-mentioned ethnic group. Clause VI of the "Royal Order of 22 August 1776", issued by King Charles III of Spain established that the town of Arizpe was the capital of the Western Internal Provinces, with jurisdiction over the Intendency of Arizona, The Californias, Sonora and Sinaloa, Nueva Vizcaya (nowadays Durango), and Chihuahua. The town was also the seat of the Intendency of Arizpe. In 1648 the mission of San José de Chinapa was founded, first functioning as a town to be visited by missionaries heading from Arizpe.

On March 19, 1812, when the Spanish Constitution of 1812 came into force, the first municipalities of the Western State were established, and it was a year later, in 1813, when Arizpe was promulgated as an independent municipality along with 15 other municipalities. The following year, 1814, King Ferdinand VII of Spain dissolved these municipalities. In September 1824, after the Independence of Mexico and the authorities of this area had sworn allegiance to the new government, the seat of the local powers was changed to El Fuerte, Sinaloa. On October 31, 1825, the Constitution was reestablished, but Arizpe was not renamed a municipality since it did not meet the at least three thousand inhabitants required for the appointment. Six years later, in 1831, by a new Constitution, it was determined that the state be divided into parties. Eight parties were created including the Arizpe Party; on April 13, 1832, by a third order, it was commanded that the capital be returned to Arizpe, remaining as capital until the end of 1838, when Ures was established as its successor. In 1837 the state division was made up of districts planned by the agreement of the Departmental Board, and in the same way the District of Arizpe was created, and thus lasted until 1914, when on November 21 of that year the provisional constitutionalist governor Benjamín G. Hill decreed the abolition of the districts as part of the formation process of free municipalities during the Mexican Revolution and the structure of the local governments was managed. On September 15, 1917, Arizpe was named as a free municipality along with 66 others, and it was ruled by a municipal president and four councilors. The division into districts previously abolished was preserved only for political, electoral and finance purposes, and the Arizpe District was made up of the municipalities of: Aconchi, Agua Prieta, Bacoachi, Baviácora, Cananea, Fronteras, Huépac, San Felipe, Naco and Banámichi. In 1930 the municipalities of Banámichi and Baviácora were suppressed due to the low income they generated, and their localities were part of the municipality of Arizpe until May 13, 1931, when they were rehabilitated as independent municipalities back, and they remain so until today.

== Geography ==
The municipality is located in the center-north area of the state of Sonora, between parallels 30° 6' 42.16" and 30° 46' 16.25" North latitude, and meridians 109° 44' 14.89" and 110° 30' 8.6" West longitude, at a minimum altitude of 2297 feet above sea level (700 meters asl) and a maximum of 7546 feet asl (2,300 meters asl).

Its territory limits to the North with the municipality of Cananea, to the Northeast with that of Bacoachi, to the East with that of Nacozari de García, to the Southeast with that of Cumpas, to the South with Banámichi, to the Southwest with Opodepe, to the West with Cucurpe, and to the Northwest with that of Ímuris.

=== Municipal limits ===
It has administrative limits with the following municipalities according to their location:

This municipality has an area of 1,186.56 square miles (3,073.17 km^{2}), which represents 1.7% of the state total and 0.14% of the national.

=== Climate ===
The Municipality of Arizpe has a dry climate and semi-warm, with a maximum average monthly temperature of 84.02 °F (28.9 °C) in the months of July and August; and a minimum monthly mean of 52.52 °F (11.4 °C) in the months of February and March; and an annual mean temperature of 68.18 °F (20.1 °C). The rains occur in summer, during the months of July and August with an annual average precipitation of 421.5 millimeters. Frosts occasionally occur from November to February.

=== Topography ===
In the western region of the municipality is the Sierra San Antonio, in the eastern area, the Sierra El Carmen, and from the north it penetrates towards the southern end of the Sierra El Manzanal. There are less rugged areas towards the center of the municipality on the vegas of the Bacanuchi River and the Sonora River.

=== Hydrography ===
The Sonora River crosses the municipality and is born in Ojo de Agua de Arvayo in the municipality of Cananea, with a continuous and permanent flow that will flow into the Abelardo L. Rodríguez Dam; the Bacanuchi river is born in Milpillas, a place also in the municipality of Cananea, and empties into the Sonora River. The most important streams of the municipality of Arizpe are: Piedras de Lumbre, Cuevas, San Cristóbal, Agua Caliente, Basochuca, Toro Muerto, Nogalitos. There are a dam named La Cieneguita, and two small reservoirs to be used in pasture lands.

=== Flora and fauna ===
Vegetation of oak forest exists in the municipality; it is located near the Sierra de San Antonio and Sierra El Carmen. A large extension of municipal territory is covered with grasslands (natural and induced). Towards the central and southern part the characteristic vegetation is made up of tropical scrub, palo dulce, copal, nopal, cat's claw and bilberry cactus. Small areas are dedicated to agriculture on the banks of the Sonora River. In the northeast of the municipality there are areas of thorny scrub.

In the municipality there are the following species of animals:

- Amphibians: toad, frog.
- Reptiles: river turtle, mountain tortoise, little lizard, Sonoran coral snake, rattlesnake, lizard, and chameleon.
- Mammals: white-tailed deer, cougar, lynx, coyote, wild boar, raccoon, hare, rabbit, gray fox, squirrel, and field mouse.
- Birds: owl, crow, buzzard, black duck, gray hawk, red-tailed hawk, and dove.

== Demographics ==
According to the results of the 14th Population and Housing Census carried out in 2020 by the National Institute of Statistics and Geography (INEGI), the total population of the municipality is 2,788 inhabitants; with a population density of 0.90 inhabitants/km^{2}, and ranks 37th in the state in order of population. Of the total population, 1,446 are men and 1,342 are women. In 2020 there were 1,555 homes, but of these, 968 homes were inhabited, of which 265 were run by a woman. Of the total population, 3 people over 3 years of age (0.11% of the municipal total) speak some Mexican indigenous language; while 5 inhabitants (0.18%) consider themselves Afro-Mexican or Afro-descendant.

94.51% of the population of the municipality belongs to the Catholic religion, 4.05% is Evangelical Christian/Protestant or of some variant, and 0.18% is of another religion, while 1.18% do not profess any religion.

=== Education and health ===
According to the 2020 Population and Housing Census; 18 children between 6 and 11 years old (0.65% of the total), 12 adolescents between 12 and 14 years old (0.43%), 79 adolescents between 15 and 17 years old (2.83%), and 13 young people between 18 and 24 years old (0.47%) do not attend any educational institution. 61 inhabitants of 15 years or more (2.19%) are illiterate, 66 inhabitants of 15 years or more (2.37%) have no education level, 404 people of 15 years or more (14.49%) attended several years of elementary school but did not complete it, 106 people aged 15 years or over (3.8%) started secondary school without finishing it. The municipality has an educational level of 8.13.

The number of population that is not affiliated with a health service is 694 people, that is, 24.89% of the municipal total, otherwise, 75.04% does have medical insurance either public or private. In the territory, 333 people (11.94%) have some disability or motor limit to carry out their daily activities, while 38 inhabitants (1.36%) have some mental problem or condition.

=== Localities ===
The municipality has a total of 72 localities, of which the main ones and the population they have are the following:

Locality	Population
Total municipality	2,788
Arizpe	1,666
Sinoquipe	390
Bacanuchi	183
Chinapa	139
Tahuichopa	80
Bamori	76
Buenavista	62
El Molino de Bacanuchi	28
La Nueva Colonia de Chinapa	13
Basochuca	12

- Other small towns are also: El Derrumbadero, El Álamo, La Bolita, Comatero, La Galera, among others.

== Government ==
The seat of the municipal government lies in the town of Arizpe where the Municipal Palace is located. The council is made up of a municipal president, a syndic, three councilors with a relative majority and, two with proportional representation, and is assisted by delegates from the localities.

The municipality belongs to the 2nd Federal Electoral District of Sonora based in the city of Nogales, and to the 6th Electoral District of Sonora based in Cananea.

=== Political subdivision ===
According to the Organic Order Law of the State of Sonora, the municipality for its administration is divided into three commisaryships, listed below in alphabetical order:

Bacanuchi
Chinapa
Sinoquipe

=== Municipal presidents ===
Municipal president	Term	Political party	Notes
Francisco Gabriel Serrano Bustamante	1991–1994	PRI	
Ignacio Pesqueira Taylor	1994–1997	PRI	
Juan Manuel Montijo Ortiz	1997–2000	PRI	
Flavio Romero Ruiz	2000–2003	PRI	
Enrique Pesqueira Pellar	16-09-2003–15-09-2006	PAN	
Héctor Alvarado Morales	16-09-2006–15-09-2009	PAN	
Raymundo Pesqueira Bustamante	16-09-2009–15-09-2012	PAN	
Vidal Guadalupe Vázquez Chacón	16/09-2012–15-09-2015	PAN; Panal	
Mario Alberto Castro Acosta	16-09-2015–15-09-2018	PRI; PVEM; Panal	Coalition "For an Honest and Effective Government"
Lucía de Guadalupe Serrano Acuña	16-09-2018–15-09-2021	PRI; PVEM; Panal	Coalition "All for Sonora"
Alma Isela Medina Maldonado	16-09-2021–15-09-2024	Morena	
Dulce Griselda Alvarado Morales	16-09-2024–	PAN; PRI; PRD	
