= Guillermo Padrés Elías =

Mexican politician

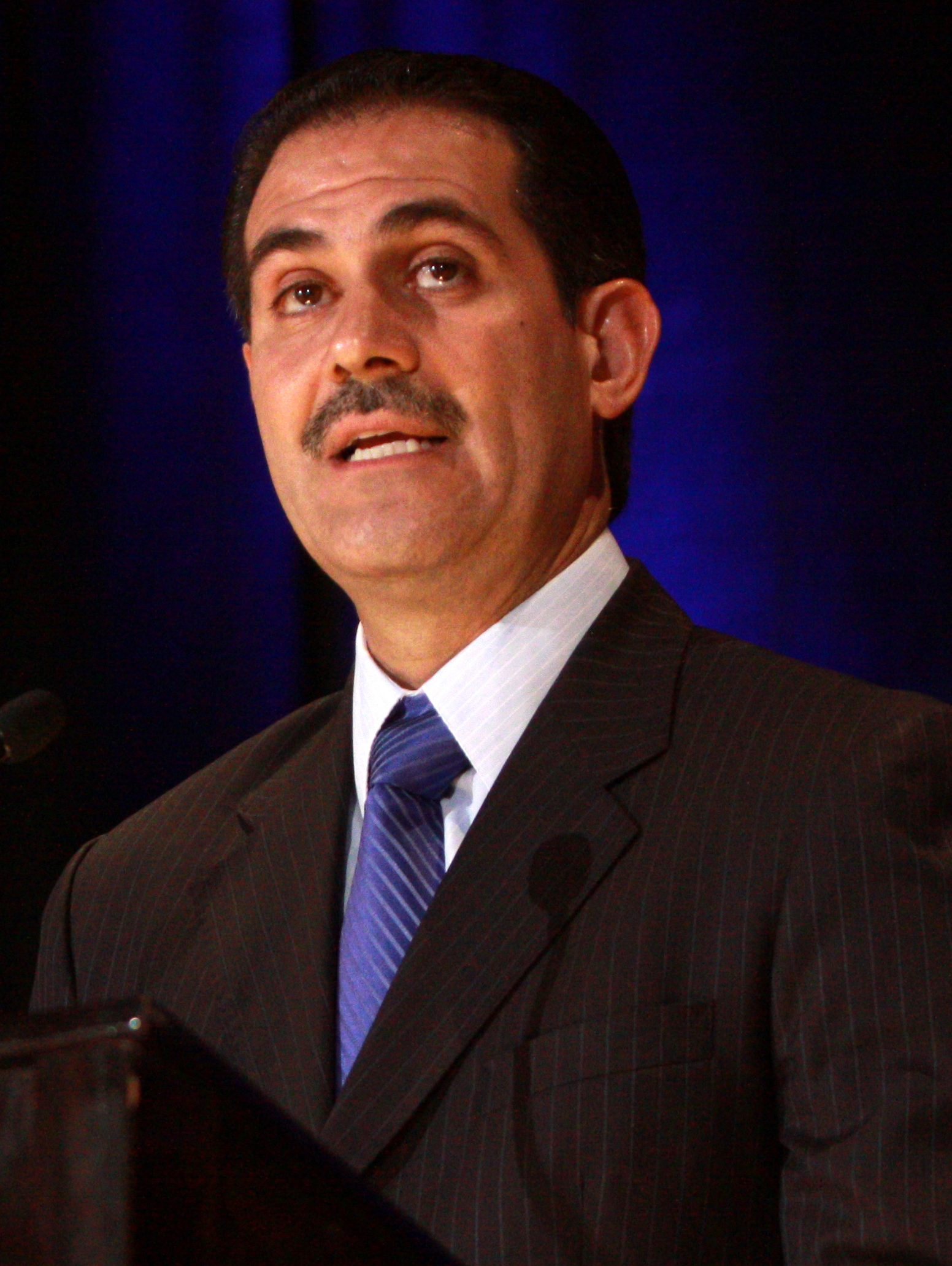

Governor of Sonora
- In office 13 September 2009 – 12 September 2015
- Preceded by: Eduardo Bours
- Succeeded by: Claudia Pavlovich Arellano

Member of the Senate for Sonora
- In office 28 August 2006 – 1 September 2009

Member of the Chamber of Deputies for Sonora's 2nd district
- In office 28 August 2000 – 31 August 2003
- Preceded by: Héctor Mayer Soto
- Succeeded by: Fermín Trujillo Fuentes

Member of the Congress of Sonora from the 7th district
- In office 16 September 1997 – 15 September 2000
- Preceded by: Alonso Márquez Félix
- Succeeded by: Francisco García Gámez

Personal details
- Born: 29 June 1969 (age 57) Cananea, Sonora
- Party: National Action Party
- Education: Universidad Humanitas

Guillermo Padrés Elías (born 29 June 1969) is a Mexican politician and a member of the National Action Party (PAN). He served as Governor of Sonora from 2009 to 2015.

== Political career ==
Padres' political career began in 1997 when he was elected to the Congress of Sonora as State Representative for the 7th electoral district with 61 percent of the vote. In 2000, he was elected to the Chamber of Deputies for Sonora's 2nd congressional district for the LVIII Legislature with 50.35 percent of the votes, and served until 2003.

In 2006, he was elected to the Senate representing Sonora. His party received 44 percent of the vote. As Senator, he served as Chairman of the Agriculture and Livestock Committee, and served on the Justice Committee and Water Resources Committee.

On 16 January 2008, he announced his intention to run for Governor of Sonora in the 2009 elections. On 1 March 2009, he won the first day of PAN elections in Sonora, with 2,625 votes against 1,709 for María Dolores del Rio and 477 for Florencio Diaz Armenta. The following day, María Dolores del Rio and Florencio Diaz Armenta withdrew from the race, leaving Padrés as the sole candidate.

== Governor of Sonora ==
In the gubernatorial election of 5 July 2009, Padrés Elías defeated the Institutional Revolutionary Party (PRI) candidate, Alfonso Elías Serrano, with 464,865 votes for Padrés Elías against 425,050 votes for Elías Serrano; however, the PRI challenged the election results. On 17 August, the State Electoral Tribunal rejected the challenge, and certified the election of Padrés Elías. The PRI appealed to the Federal Electoral Tribunal, which on 11 September also rejected the challenge. Padrés Elías served as Governor of Sonora from 2009 to 2015.

== Arrest and criminal charges ==
Padrés Elías was wanted by the Federal Police and Interpol on multiple charges of corruption, embezzlement, and extortion. In total, Padrés transferred US$8.9 million from Mexico to US bank accounts. Authorities seized 19 properties belonging to Padrés Elías in the municipalities of Arizpe, Cananea, Cajeme and Hermosillo, as well as two properties belonging to his associates.

After a long man-hunt, Padrés gave himself up to the Federal authorities on 10 November 2016, claiming innocence. He was released on 2 February 2019, to continue the process.

Preceded by Eduardo Bours	Governor of Sonora; 2009 – 2015	Succeeded by Claudia Pavlovich Arellano
Preceded by Carlos Villalobos Organista	Senator for Sonora; First formula 2006 – 2008	Succeeded by Emma Lucía Larios Gaxiola
Preceded by Héctor Mayer Soto	Federal Deputy for District II in Sonora; 2000 – 2003	Succeeded by Fermín Trujillo Fuentes
