= Juan de Dios Bojórquez =

Mexican writer and politician (1892–1967)

Senator for Sonora
- In office 1964–1967

Secretary of the Interior
- In office 1934–1935

Federal deputy for Sonora's 2nd district
- In office 1920–1922

Personal details
- Born: 8 March 1892 San Miguel de Horcasitas, Sonora, Mexico
- Died: 27 July 1967 (aged 75) Federal District, Mexico
- Party: PRI & forerunners
- Education: National School of Agriculture
- Occupation: Writer, journalist, politician
- Profession: Agricultural engineer

Juan de Dios Bojórquez León (Note: In this Spanish name, the first or paternal surname is Bojórquez and the second or maternal family name is León.) (8 March 1892 – 27 July 1967) was a Mexican writer and politician. He was elected to the 1917 constituent congress and to both chambers of the Congress of the Union, and he served as secretary of the interior under President Lázaro Cárdenas. As a writer and journalist, he frequently published under the nom de plume Djed Bórquez.

== Biography ==
Juan de Dios Bojórquez was born in San Miguel de Horcasitas, Sonora, on 8 March 1892. He graduated as an agricultural engineer from the National School of Agriculture in 1912. During the Mexican Revolution he joined the constitutionalist forces of Venustiano Carranza, where he rose to the rank of colonel.

In 1916, he was elected to the Constituent Congress of Querétaro for Sonora's 4th district and, in 1920, he was elected to the Chamber of Deputies for Sonora's 2nd district.

From 1921 to 1926 he was Mexico's minister plenipotentiary in Honduras, Guatemala and Cuba and, in 1923, he was appointed ambassador to Guatemala. In 1934–1935 he served as secretary of the interior during the first years of President Lázaro Cárdenas's administration.

In the 1964 general election he was elected to the Senate for Sonora; his death, in Mexico City on 27 July 1967, brought a premature end to his term of office.

== Writing ==
Bojórquez's works, often published under his nom de plume Djed Bórquez, include chronicles, biographies and works of fiction. As a journalist he founded Matinal, the first morning daily paper in the state of Sonora, and he also contributed to the national dailies Excélsior and El Universal and was the managing editor of El Nacional.

His notable publications included:

- Yorem Tamegua (1923), novel
- El héroe de Nacozari (1926), novel
- Islas Marías (1937), novel
- Crónica del Constituyente (1938), record of the constituent congress
- Hombres y aspectos de México. En la tercera etapa de la revolución (1963), collection of articles published in Excélsior
