= Santa Cruz Municipality =

Santa Cruz Municipality may refer to:

Bolivia

- Santa Cruz de la Sierra, in Santa Cruz Department

Mexico

- Santa Cruz Municipality, Sonora

Philippines

- Santa Cruz, Davao del Sur
- Santa Cruz, Ilocos Sur
- Santa Cruz, Laguna
- Santa Cruz, Marinduque
- Santa Cruz, Occidental Mindoro
- Santa Cruz, Zambales
