= Rosa Albina Garavito =

Mexican politician and scholar

Rosa Albina Garavito (born 7 March 1947 in Santa Cruz, Sonora) is a Mexican politician and scholar.

A graduate of the Universidad Autónoma de Nuevo León (UANL), Garavito has served in the lower and upper house of the Mexican Congress representing the Party of the Democratic Revolution (PRD). She taught at the Autonomous University of Baja California (UABC), UANL and Universidad Autónoma Metropolitana (UAM) Azcapotzalco campus.
