= Sinoquipe =

Town in Arizpe, Sonora, Mexico

Coordinates: 30°09′19″N 110°14′42″W

Sinoquipe is a town in Arizpe Municipality, located in the north-central region of the Mexican state of Sonora, in the western part of the Sierra Madre Occidental.

The town was founded in 1646 as a visiting town of the Jesuit mission of Our Lady of the Assumption of Arizpe under the name of Saint Ignatius of Sinoquipe by the Jesuit missionary Ignacio Molarja.
