= Ernesto Munro Palacio =

Mexican politician and baseball player

Ernesto Munro Palacio (born 16 October 1948) is a Mexican former baseball player and politician affiliated with the National Action Party (PAN). He served in the LVI Legislature of the Congress of Sonora from 2000 to 2003 before being appointed the Executive Secretary of Public Security of Sonora by Governor Guillermo Padrés Elías. Munro Palacio later served as president of the PAN's Sonora branch from 2018 to 2021.

== Early years and baseball career ==
Munro Palacio was born on 16 October 1948 in Puerto Peñasco, Sonora, Mexico. His family had arrived from Hermosillo to the city of Puerto Peñasco in 1928 to work in what was at the time a small fishing camp; his parents Guillermo Munro Fourcade and María Palacio were among the first settlers there.

Munro Palacio played baseball as a pitcher. In 1968, he played 27 games for the Algodoneros de Unión Laguna. He also pitched for the Tiburones de Puerto Peñasco in 1969 and the Sultanes de Monterrey in 1970.

== Political career ==
In 1991, Munro unsuccessfully ran as the PAN candidate for the municipal presidency of Puerto Peñasco. He was defeated by Conrado Vélez Rivera of the Institutional Revolutionary Party (PRI). Munro Palacio demanded fraud in the elections due to possible vote buying. As a result, the people and PAN militants demonstrated violently with riots in the city, destroying government offices, burning cars, and damaging local businesses. During the elections, the PRI candidate for governor of Sonora, Manlio Fabio Beltrones, who was then serving as Secretary of Government, along with the State Judicial Police, managed to resolve the disturbances. They were able to calm the protesters down and secure the appointment of an interim municipal president, unrelated to the two previous candidates.

In September 2000, Munro was appointed multi-member deputy of the LVI Legislature of the Congress of Sonora. Later, on 13 September 2009, he was appointed as the Executive Secretary of Public Security of Sonora, when the cabinet of former Governor Guillermo Padrés Elías was announced. He went on to serve as president of the PAN's Sonora branch from 2018 to 2021.
