= San Bernardino Lagunas =

Village in the Agua Prieta Municipality, Sonora, Mexico

Coordinates: 31°19′N 109°16′W

San Bernardino Lagunas (also, Lagunas) is a village in Agua Prieta Municipality in the Mexican state of Sonora.
