= Ímuris Municipality =

Coordinates: 30.7667°N 110.833°W

Ímuris
- Municipality
- Coat of arms

- Location of the municipality in Sonora.
- Country: Mexico
- State: Sonora
- Seat: Ímuris

Government
  - Municipal president: Jesús Leonardo García Acedo (PRI)
  - Federal electoral district: Sonora's 2nd
- Time zone: UTC–07:00 (Zona Pacífico)

Ímuris is a municipality in the state of Sonora in north-western Mexico. The municipal seat is the city of Ímuris.

== Area and population ==
The municipal area is 1,710.3 km^{2} with a population of 9,988 registered in 2000. Most of the inhabitants live in the municipal seat, which had a population of 5,767 in 2000. The municipal population has increased greatly with the installation of maquiladoras and is now estimated to be around 14,000.

== Neighboring municipalities ==
Neighboring municipalities are Nogales, Santa Cruz, Cananea, Arizpe, Cucurpe, and Magdalena de Kino.

== Government ==
=== Municipal presidents ===
Municipal president	Term	Political party	Notes
Hilario Gabiolondo			
Juan de Dios Cubillas			
Tiburcio Soto			
Miguel Estrella			
Domingo Soto			
Gabriel Corella			
Rafael Q. Corella			
Jerónimo Calera			
Ignacio Córdova			
Pablo González			
Simón Federico	1915–1916		
Arturo Ortiz	1916–1917		
José María Peña	1917–1918		
Teodoro G. Lizárraga	1918–1919		
Manuel Díaz	1919–1920		
Francisco S. Soto	1921–1922		
Francisco F. Bartell	1922–1923		
Vicente S. Soto	1923–1924		
Pablo González	1924–1925		
Rafael N. Corella	1925–1926		
Guadalupe Egurrola	1926–1927		
Eduardo Molina	1927–1928		
Ramón S. Soto	1928–1929		
Rafael N. Corella	1929–1930	PNR	
Rafael Bonillas P.	1930–1931	PNR	
Francisco S. Soto	1931–1932	PNR	
Francisco F. Molina	1932–1933	PNR	
Cerbulo S. Soto	1933–1935	PNR	
Ramón R. López	1935–1937	PNR	
Luis Proto Barreda	1937–1939	PNR	
Cerbulo S. Soto	1939–1941	PRM	
Roberto M. Aldaco	1941–1943	PRM	
Federico Egurrola S.	1943–1946	PRM	
Enrique Ceceña	1946–1949	PRI	
Roberto R. López	1949–1952	PRI	
Juan L. Soto	1952–1955	PRI	
Edgardo Peralta	1955–1958	PRI	
Carlos Corella S.	1958–1961	PRI	
Heriberto Lizárraga V.	1961–1964	PRI	
Alfonso Soto Bartell	1964–1967	PRI	
Roberto Egurrola Tapia	1967–1970	PRI	
Carlos Federico Vera	1970–1973	PRI	
Raúl Ramírez Ochoa	1973–1976	PRI	
José R. Rentería Montijo	1976–1979	PRI	
Ernesto Valenzuela Bonillas	1979–1982	PRI	
Concepción Bermúdez López	1982–1985	PRI	
José Luis Lizárraga Ballesteros	1985–1988	PRI	
Víctor Manuel Soto Silva	1988–1991	PRI	
Sacramento Soto Andrade	1991–1994	PRI	
Reynaldo Alberto Corella Vázquez	1994–1997	PRI	
Eliodoro Rascón Amavizca	1997–2000	PAN	
Josefina Aurelia Romero Salazar	2000–2003	PRI	
Manuel Octavio Fernández Moreno	16-09-2003–15-09-2006	PRI	
Carlos Gallego Aguilar	16-09-2006–15-09-2009	PVEM	
Juan Gómez López	16-09-2009–15-09-2012	PAN	
José David Hernández Rodríguez	16/09-2012–15-09-2015	PRI	
Carlos Gallego Aguilar	16-09-2015–15-09-2018	PAN	
Jesús Alberto Rentería Vásquez	16-09-2018–15-09-2021	PT; Morena; PES	Coalition "Together We Will Make History".
Jesús Leonardo García Acedo	16-09-2021–15-09-2024	PRI	
Jesús Leonardo García Acedo	16-09-2024–	PRI	He was reelected
