= David Galindo Delgado =

Mexican politician

- Born: 7 December 1975 (age 50); Nogales, Sonora, Mexico
- Occupation: Deputy
- Political party: PAN

David Cuauhtémoc Galindo Delgado (born 7 December 1975) is a Mexican politician affiliated with the National Action Party (PAN). In the 2012 general election he was elected to the Chamber of Deputies to represent Sonora's 2nd district during the 62nd Congress.
