= 1924 Mexican general election =

← 1920	6 July 1924	1928 →
- Presidential election
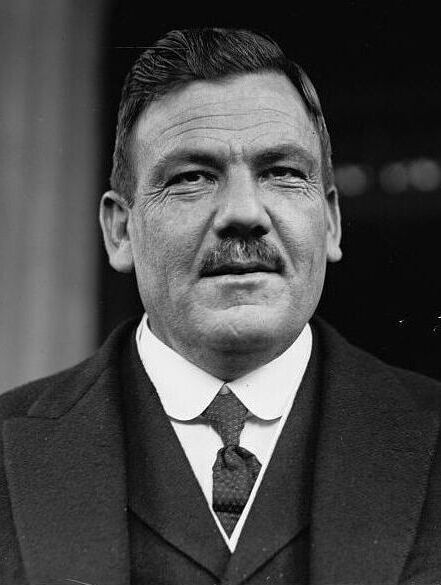

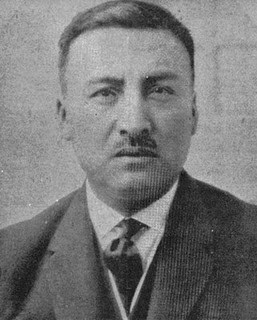
Nominee	Plutarco Elías Calles	Ángel Flores
Party	Laborist	LPN
Popular vote	1,340,634	252,599
Percentage	84.14%	15.85%
President before election
Álvaro Obregón
Laborist
Elected President
Plutarco Elías Calles
Laborist

General elections were held in Mexico on 6 July 1924. Plutarco Elías Calles won the presidential elections with 84% of the vote.

== Results ==
=== President ===
Candidate	Party	Votes	%
Plutarco Elías Calles	Laborist Party	1,340,634	84.14
Ángel Flores	National Political League	252,599	15.85
Other candidates		24	0.00
Total		1,593,257	100.00
Source: Nohlen
