= Agua Prieta Municipality =

Coordinates: 31.3258°N 109.5489°W

Agua Prieta
- Municipality
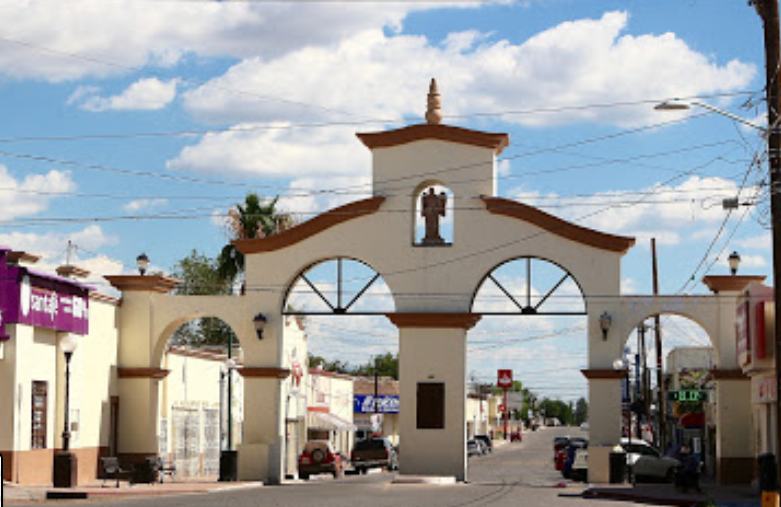
- Avenida Panamericana, Agua Prieta

- Coat of arms

- Location of the municipality in Sonora
- Country: Mexico
- State: Sonora
- Seat: Agua Prieta

Population (2020)
  - Total: 91,929
- Time zone: UTC–07:00 (Zona Pacífico)
- Area code: +52 633

Agua Prieta is a municipality in the state of Sonora in north-western Mexico. In 2015, the municipality had a total population of 82,918; by 2020, it had risen to 91,929.

The municipal seat is the border city of Agua Prieta, Sonora.

== Localities ==
- San Bernardino Lagunas

== Adjacent municipalities and counties ==
- Janos, Chihuahua – east
- Bavispe – southeast
- Nacozari de García – south
- Fronteras – southwest
- Naco – west
- Cochise County, Arizona – northwest
- Hidalgo County, New Mexico – northeast
