= Fronteras =

- Town
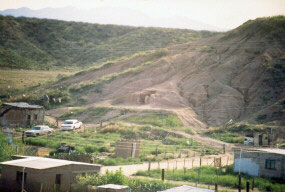

- Location in Mexico Fronteras (Mexico)
- Coordinates: 30°53′46″N 109°33′30″W
- Country: Mexico
- State: Sonora
- Municipality: Fronteras
- Elevation: 1,120 m (3,670 ft)

Population (2001 est.)
  - Total: 876
- Time zone: UTC-07:00 (Zona Pacífico)

Fronteras is the seat of Fronteras Municipality in the northeastern part of the Mexican state of Sonora. Frontera translates as Border. The elevation is 1,120 meters and neighboring municipalities are Agua Prieta, Nacozari and Bacoachi. The area is 2839.62 km^{2}, which represents 1.53% of the state total.

Fronteras was founded by the Jesuits as a mission in 1645.

== Geography ==
Fronteras is located in a mountainous area on the west side of the Sierra Madre Occidental. The average annual temperature is 16.9 °C. The rainy season is from July to August and the average annual rainfall is 427.5 millimeters.

== Demographics ==
The municipal population was 7,081 (2.34 /km^{2}) in 2000, although in a second counting in 2005 this had increased to 7,470. The most important settlement and the municipal seat had 874 inhabitants in 2000.

== Economy ==
Industry is the most important economic activity together with agriculture and cattle raising. There was one maquiladora in 2000. The main agricultural crops were wheat, beans, corn and grasses for cattle fodder. The cattle herd was substantial with over 30,000 head counted in 2000. Almost all were for meat production.

== History and landmarks ==
The Spanish explorer Juan Bautista de Anza (1735-1788) led the first Spanish overland expedition to the Las Californias Province of New Spain in 1769, previously only sighted and claimed for the Crown from the sea. He established the first Spanish settlement in present-day California, the Presidio of San Diego, and was the second European (after Francis Drake) to see the San Francisco Bay.

Fronteras was originally founded as Santa Rosa de Corodeguachi, a Spanish presidio.

Visitors can explore the Mission San Ignacio de Cuquiarachi founded in 1645 by the Jesuit missionary Marcos del Río. It is one of the Spanish missions in the Sonoran Desert. Two archaeological zones, of ancient Pima Indigenous people of the Americas settlement sites, are located near the village of Ojo de Agua. Other points of interest are the Jacinto López reservoir, and the Cave of Presidio de Fronteras.

In the early 20th century, Fronteras gained fame as the home of Plutarco Elias Calles, recognized as the architect of modern Mexico and the country's 40th president. Although born in the coastal town of Guaymas, Sonora, Elias Calles became the prosperous owner of the Fronteras flour mill, and developed his political alliances in Fronteras.

In 2010, Fronteras again gained prominence with the discovery of a large deposit of dinosaur fossils, claimed by paleontologists as unique species previously unknown to science.
