= Miguel Pompa Corella =

Mexican politician

- Born: 12 December 1970 (age 55); Nogales, Sonora, Mexico
- Occupation: Politician
- Political party: PRI

Miguel Ernesto Pompa Corella (born 12 December 1970) is a Mexican politician from the Institutional Revolutionary Party (PRI). From 2009 to 2012 he served as Deputy of the LXI Legislature of the Mexican Congress representing Sonora's 2nd district. He is serving as Secretary of the State of Sonora of the government of Claudia Pavlovich, current Governor of Sonora from 2015 to 2021.
