= Claudia Pavlovich Arellano =

Mexican politician and lawyer

Claudia Pavlovich
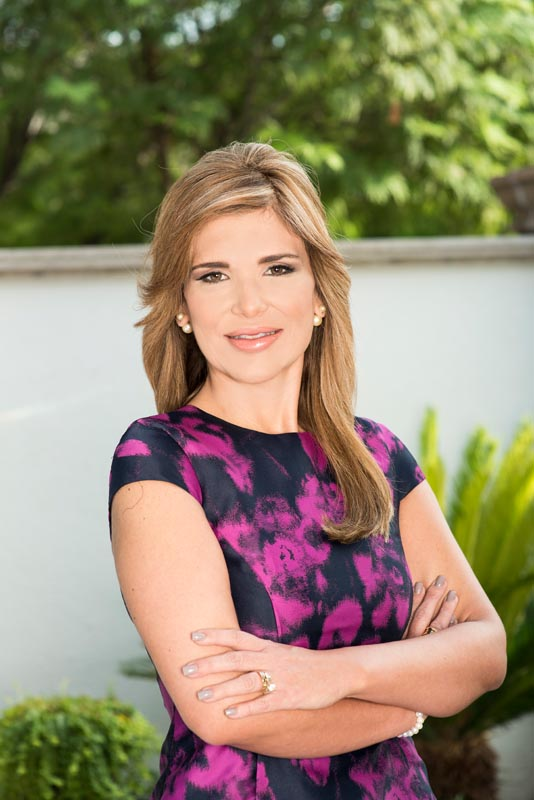

26th Governor of Sonora
- In office 13 September 2015 – 12 September 2021
- Preceded by: Guillermo Padrés Elías
- Succeeded by: Alfonso Durazo

Personal details
- Born: 17 June 1969 (age 57) Magdalena de Kino, Sonora, Mexico
- Party: Institutional Revolutionary Party
- Education: University of Sonora (LLB)

Claudia Artemiza Pavlovich Arellano (born 17 June 1969) is a Mexican politician and lawyer affiliated with the Institutional Revolutionary Party (PRI). She served as Governor of Sonora from 2016 to 2021, the first woman to govern the state. Previously she served as Senator of the LXII Legislature of the Mexican Congress representing Sonora.

== Early life and family ==
Pavlovich was born in Magdalena de Kino, Sonora, to Miguel Pavlovich Sugich and Alicia Arellano Tapia. Her paternal family is of Serb descent. Her great-grandfather Lucas (Luka) Pavlović moved to Sonora from Paštrovići (present-day Montenegro), more precisely Rijeka Reževići, in 1894 with his three brothers (Felipe, Esteban (Stijepo) and Špiro). Initially, he was employed as an ordinary worker in a company from California that was engaged in the import of oranges. Later, with his brother Felipe, he founded the company "L. J. Pavlovich y Hermano ”for the production and sale of oranges, which operated in Sonora, USA and Canada. During his visit to the Kingdom of Yugoslavia, he met King Alexander Karađorđević, who appointed him Honorary Consul of the Kingdom of Yugoslavia in Mexico.

She was graduated from the school of law at the University of Sonora. She is married to Sergio Torres Ibarra with whom she has three daughters: Claudia, Ana and Gabriela.

== Political beginnings ==
Between 2000 and 2003 she served as councilor of the city of Hermosillo. From 2006 to 2009 she was local Deputy in the Congress of Sonora for the 8th district (Northeast Hermosillo) in addition to being a Senator from Sonora in the LXII Legislature. In early 2015 she was involved in a controversy related to the 2009 Hermosillo daycare center fire where dozens of children died, where in her capacity as local MP, she advocated on behalf of the nursery owners.

== Elections for governor of Sonora ==
On 16 February 2015 the PRI ratified Pavlovich as party candidate for Governor of Sonora at a convention of delegates where the Secretary of the CEN of the PRI, Ivonne Ortega Pacheco, protested. The nomination was majority supported by the Commission of the CDE of the PRI Internal Processes presided by Ricardo García Sánchez; attended by the coordinator of the Parliamentary Faction of the PRI in Congress, Manlio Fabio Beltrones.

In the campaign prior to the election campaign leaks were reported in the press in which Pavlovich could be heard asking for money in exchange for favors from Sonoran entrepreneurs. During the campaign she was accused of "misuse of funds, conflict of interest, and influence peddling."

In the June 2015 elections she won 486,944 votes, or 47.58% of the total, making her Sonora's first female governor.

== See also ==
- Congress of Sonora

== Literature ==
- Salazar Lamadrid, Alejandra (2004). Los Reyes de la Naranja: producción y comercialización de naranja en Hermosillo, Sonora (1894–1927) (PDF). Ciudad de México.
