= Unámichi =

- Town
- Location within Mexico
- Coordinates: 30°40′24″N 109°59′00″W
- Country: Mexico
- State: Sonora
- Municipality: Bacoachi
- Elevation: 1,070 m (3,510 ft)

Population (2020)
  - Total: 239
- Time zone: UTC-7 (Pacific MST)
- Postal code: 84690
- Area code: 645

Unámichi is a town in Bacoachi Municipality in the north of the Mexican state of Sonora, about 135 km south of the U.S. border. It lies on Sonora State Highway 89.

According to the 2020 INEGI census, Unámichi's population was 239 inhabitants, making it the second most populated locality in the municipality.

== History ==
Unámichi was founded sometime between 1600 and 1630. Its name comes from the Ópata language and is a derivative of a hill named Buchunámichi. Many archaeological remains, such as arrowheads, axes, musket balls and silver reales have been found in the area and preserved in a local museum in Unámichi.

== Geography ==
Unámichi is situated in the Sierra Madre Occidental region in northern Sonora, approximately 135 km south of the U.S. border and 2 km west of the Sonora River. It is also about 1,070 meters above sea level. The town lies on Sonora State Highway 89, which runs from Mazocahui to Cananea, and is part of the historic Sonora River Route.

== Economy ==
Agriculture and cattle raising are the main economic activities in Unámichi, with harvest season coming in April and May. The town is also known for the sale of regional cheese, among other products.

== Education ==
The town has one primary school, Ecuela primaria Vasco de Quiroga.
