= Alfonso Elías Serrano =

Mexican politician

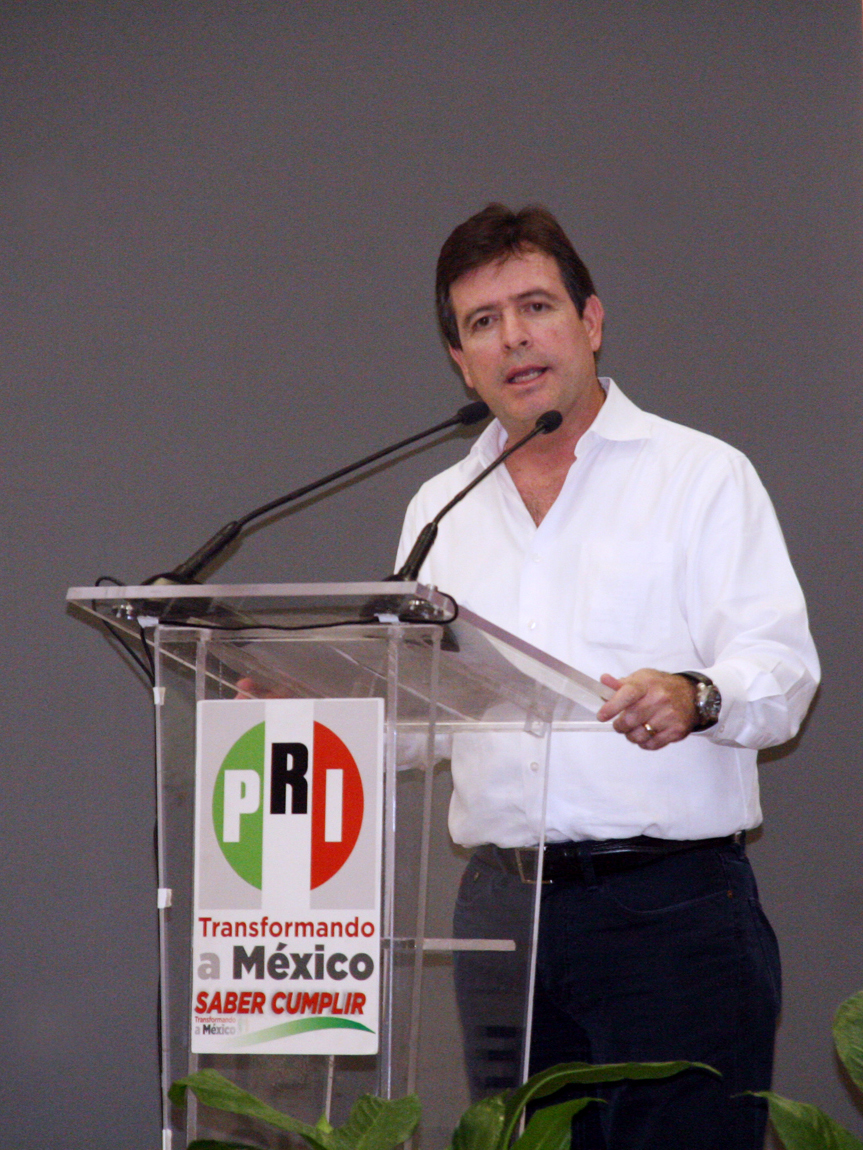
- Born: 17 August 1960 (age 65); Arizpe, Sonora, Mexico
- Occupation: Senator
- Political party: PRI

Alfonso Elías Serrano (born 17 August 1960) is a Mexican politician affiliated with the Institutional Revolutionary Party (PRI). He served as Senator of the LX and LXI Legislatures of the Mexican Congress representing Sonora.

Elías Serrano unsuccessfully ran for Governor of Sonora in the 2009 state elections, coming in second to his cousin, Guillermo Padrés Elías. A rancher who was known as El Zurdo de Avispe (English: The Lefty from Avizpe), he was later elected the president of the PRI's Sonora branch.
