= Cucurpe =

Cucurpe is the municipal seat of Cucurpe Municipality in the Mexican state of Sonora.

== History ==
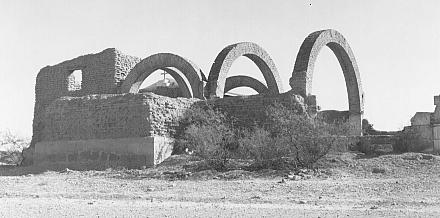
Ruins of Mission Los Santos Reyes de Cucurpe, 1970

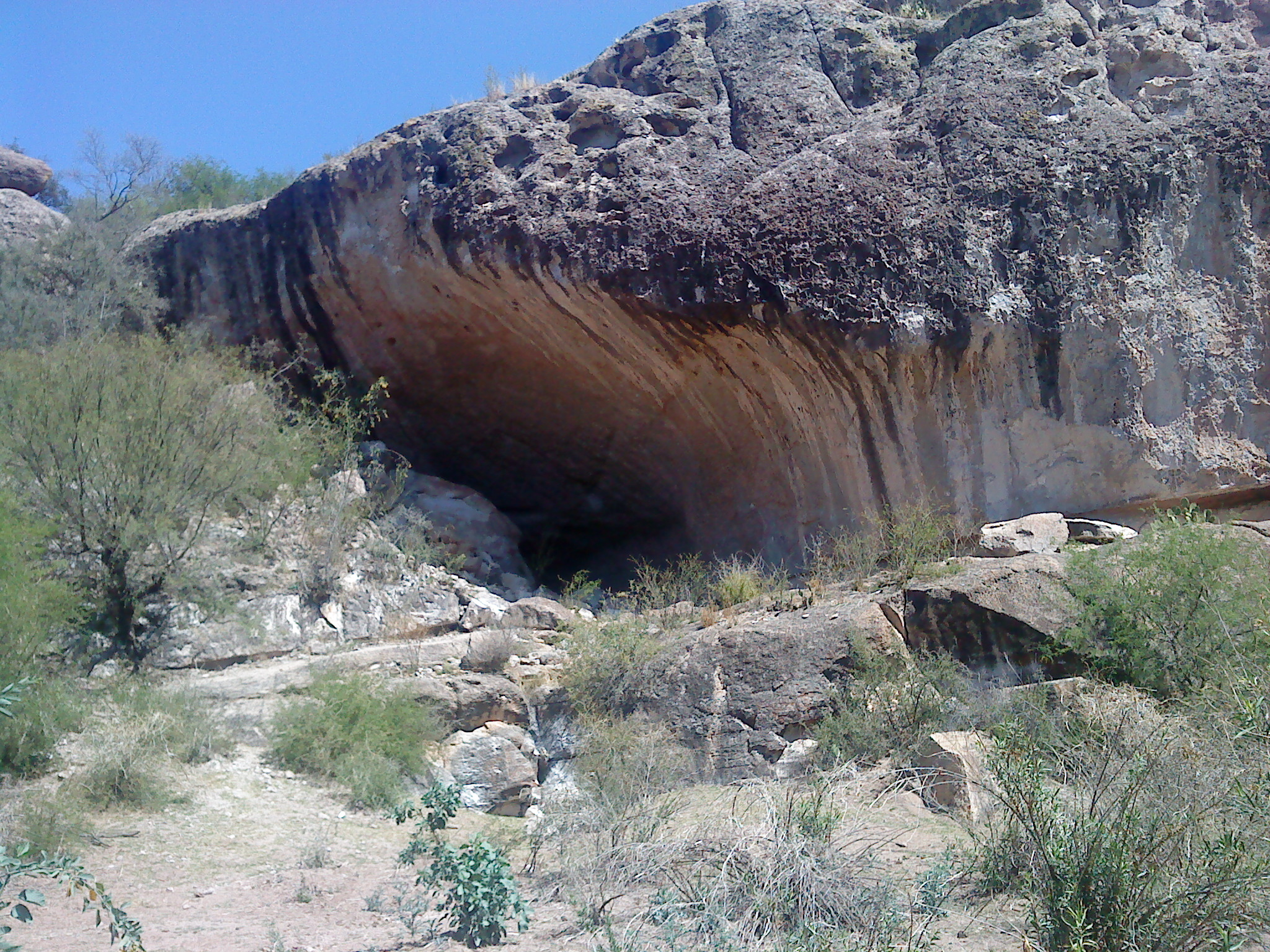
Cueva De La Pulsera, an important habitation site for early people in the area.

Originally the territory was occupied by the Opatas and the Pimas Altas. In 1647 the Jesuit missionary Marcos del Río founded the first Spanish settlement with the category of mission and gave it the name of Los Santos Reyes de Cucurpe. In 1859 it was given the title of "Villa" and in 1932 it became a municipality.

In 1691, the Moravian Jesuit Adam Gilg and the Carniolan Jesuit Marko Anton Kappus founded the mission of St. Thaddeus in Cucurpe, but it was destroyed in the same year by the Seris.

This town was once the considered the "Rim of Christendom" and it was from here that Father Eusebio Kino rode out to do his now historic work in the area then known as the Pimería Alta. He rode out on 14 March 1687, 24 years and one day before his death on 15 March 1711.

== Geography ==
=== Rivers ===
There are two rivers that have clear waters for most of the year and turbulent currents in the rainy season that lasts from June through August. The Dolores River and the Saracachi come together to form the Sonora River, which flows into the Abelardo L. Rodríguez Reservoir near Hermosillo.

=== Climate ===
Due to the higher elevation the climate is cooler than in the desert to the west. The annual average temperature is 16.5 °C, with summer temperatures rarely reaching 40° and winter days bringing frost and some snow in the higher elevations. The average annual rainfall is 466.8 millimeters.

Climate data for Cucurpe (1991–2020 normals, extremes 1978–2021)
Month	Jan	Feb	Mar	Apr	May	Jun	Jul	Aug	Sep	Oct	Nov	Dec	Year
Record high °C (°F)	38 (100)	43 (109)	47 (117)	45 (113)	47.5 (117.5)	49 (120)	49 (120)	49 (120)	45 (113)	45 (113)	44 (111)	37.5 (99.5)	49 (120)
Mean daily maximum °C (°F)	19.7 (67.5)	21.2 (70.2)	24.8 (76.6)	28.0 (82.4)	32.4 (90.3)	37.0 (98.6)	35.6 (96.1)	34.9 (94.8)	33.9 (93.0)	30.9 (87.6)	24.3 (75.7)	19.1 (66.4)	28.5 (83.3)
Daily mean °C (°F)	11.3 (52.3)	12.8 (55.0)	15.9 (60.6)	18.6 (65.5)	22.7 (72.9)	27.2 (81.0)	27.4 (81.3)	27.1 (80.8)	25.6 (78.1)	21.4 (70.5)	15.5 (59.9)	10.8 (51.4)	19.7 (67.5)
Mean daily minimum °C (°F)	2.9 (37.2)	4.4 (39.9)	7.0 (44.6)	9.2 (48.6)	13.1 (55.6)	17.4 (63.3)	19.3 (66.7)	19.2 (66.6)	17.3 (63.1)	12.0 (53.6)	6.7 (44.1)	2.4 (36.3)	10.9 (51.6)
Record low °C (°F)	−10 (14)	−10 (14)	−4 (25)	0 (32)	3.5 (38.3)	4 (39)	3.5 (38.3)	4.5 (40.1)	7 (45)	2 (36)	−4.5 (23.9)	−7 (19)	−10 (14)
Average precipitation mm (inches)	37.4 (1.47)	31.1 (1.22)	20.8 (0.82)	5.4 (0.21)	10.5 (0.41)	29.7 (1.17)	146.4 (5.76)	126.1 (4.96)	77.5 (3.05)	23.9 (0.94)	26.2 (1.03)	38.2 (1.50)	573.2 (22.57)
Average rainy days	4.0	3.7	2.5	0.9	1.1	3.6	13.6	12.3	6.4	2.1	2.7	4.2	57.1
Source: Servicio Meteorológico Nacional

== Economic activity ==
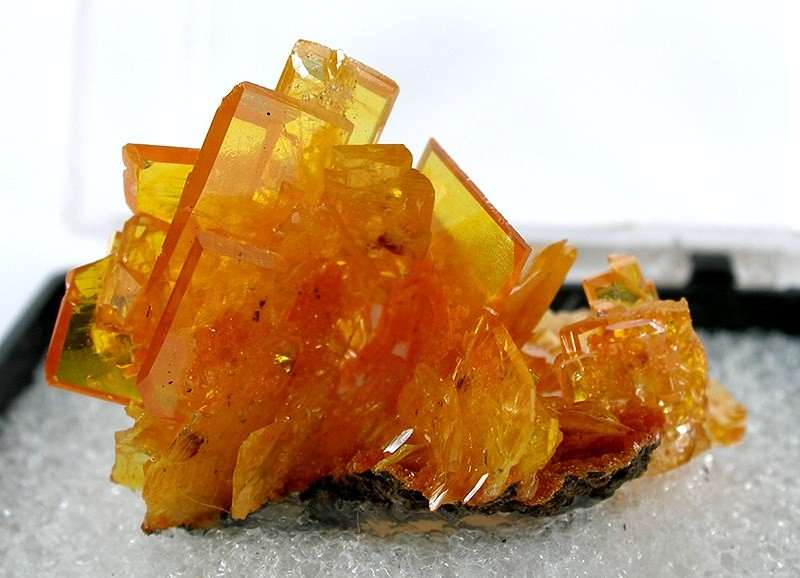
Wulfenite specimen from San Francisco mine

Most of the work force is employed in agriculture, which concentrates on growing grasses for cattle fodder. The cattle industry is modest and suffers from lack of infrastructure. There is one mine, Santa Gertrudis, which has offered a new source of employment.

=== San Francisco mine ===
This former gold-silver-molybdenum mine, located about 3 km SE of Cucurpe, is famous among mineral collectors for producing exceptionally fine specimens of wulfenite.
