= Cucurpe Municipality =

Cucurpe
- Municipality
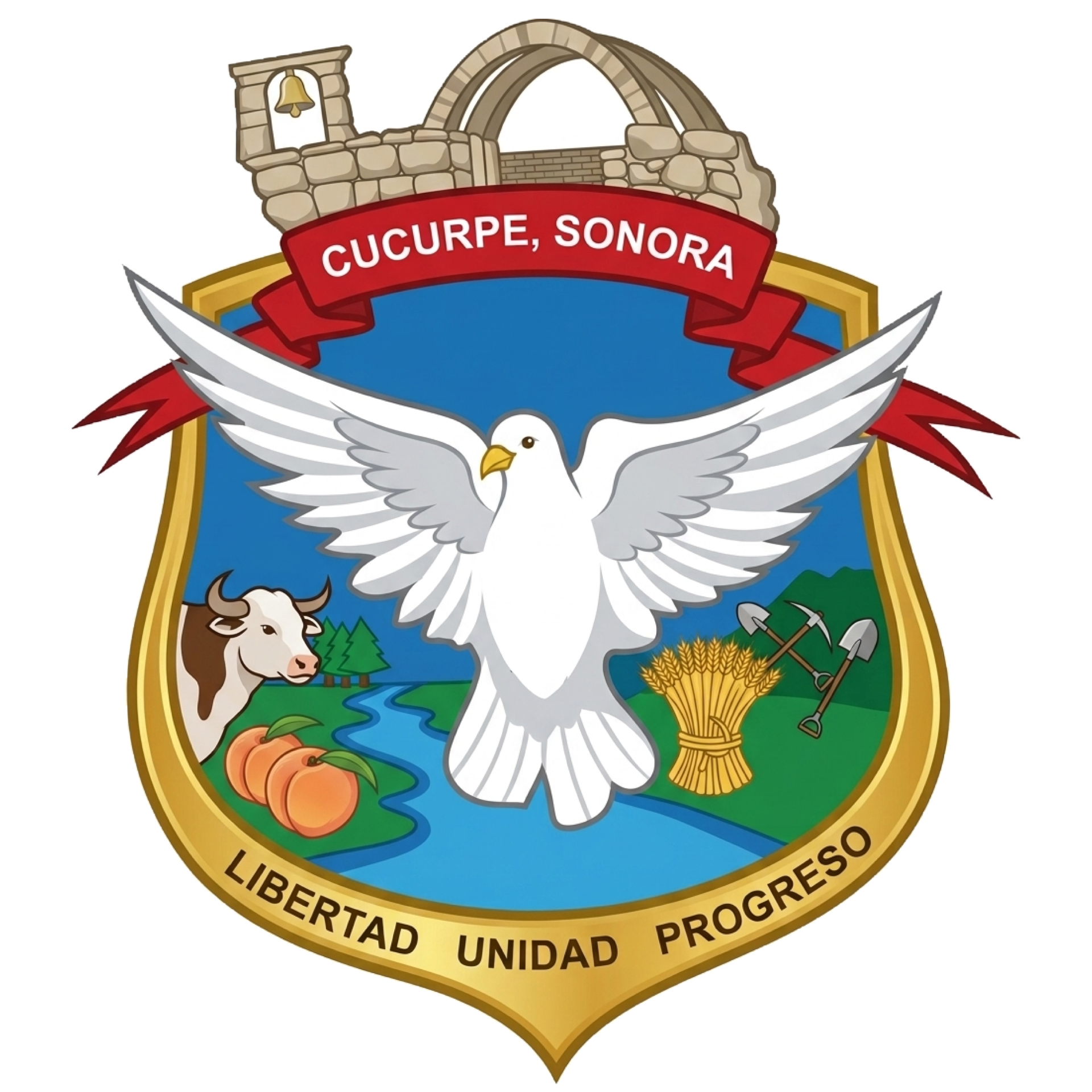
- Coat of arms

- Location of the municipality in Sonora
- Coordinates: 30°20′N 110°43′W
- Country: Mexico
- State: Sonora
- Municipal seat: Cucurpe

Area
  - Total: 1,778.55 km^{2} (686.70 sq mi)

Population (2020)
  - Total: 863
- Time zone: UTC–07:00 (Zona Pacífico)

Cucurpe is a municipality in the state of Sonora in north-western Mexico. The municipal seat is at Cucurpe.

== Area and population ==
The total area of the municipality is 1,778.55 square kilometers, which represents 0.96% of the state total and 0.09% of the national total. The population of the municipality was 937 inhabitants in the 2000 census and 798 inhabitants in the 2005 second count. The population of the municipal seat was 487 in 2000. The negative population growth is due to the high migration from this municipality, the deficient educational infrastructure, and the lack of sources of work.

In the 2020 census, the municipality reported a population of 863.

== Municipal boundaries ==
The municipality has boundaries with Imuris in the north, Arizpe in the east, Opodepe in the south, Santa Ana in the west, Magdalena de Kino in the northwest.

== Links ==
- Cucurpe, Ayuntamiento Digital — Official Website of Cucurpe, Sonora (Spanish)
