= Bacoachi =

Coordinates: 30.6333°N 109.967°W

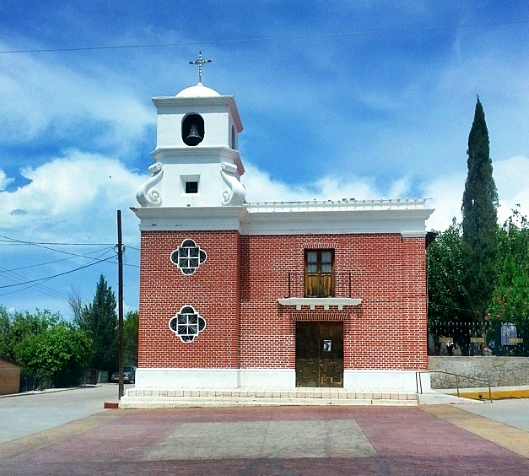
San Miguel Arcangel Church, the local Catholic place of worship.

Bacoachi is a small town in Bacoachi Municipality in the north of the Mexican state of Sonora. The area of the municipality is 487 square miles (1,260.65 km^{2}) and the population (rural and urban) was 1,475 in 2020.The elevation of the municipal seat is 4,429 feet (1,350 meters) above sea level.

Bacoachi is located southeast of Cananea and has boundaries in the north with Naco, in the east with Fronteras, in the southeast with Nacozari, in the southwest with Arizpe and in the east with Cananea. See maps at or

The territory was originally inhabited by the Opata Teguima Indians, who called their settlement "Cuchibaciachi". A Jesuit mission named San Miguel Bacoachi was founded here in 1648. In 1649, Captain Simón Lazo de la Vega founded a Spanish town in the same spot. The name means "the place of the water serpent" in the indigenous Opata language; there may have once been a "sanctuary" built in honor of a large water snake.

In 1784, a Spanish presidio was formed at the location, manned entirely by Opatas.

Most of the land is mountainous and is part of the Sierra de Sonora. There are still pine forests and a rich variety of fauna, including coyotes, jaguars, deer, raccoons, wild pigs, skunks, and owls, among others.

The population has been decreasing due to immigration to the United States of America.

There are few roads but the municipality is connected to the capital, Hermosillo, by the Hermosillo-Cananea highway.

Agriculture and cattle raising are the main economic activities. Most of the agriculture is involved in growing grasses for the cattle, which numbered over 25,000 head in 2000.

== Climate ==
Climate data for Bacoachi (1991–2020 normals, extremes 1982–2023)
Month	Jan	Feb	Mar	Apr	May	Jun	Jul	Aug	Sep	Oct	Nov	Dec	Year
Record high °C (°F)	39 (102)	38 (100)	38 (100)	39 (102)	43 (109)	45 (113)	44 (111)	43 (109)	42 (108)	39 (102)	38 (100)	35 (95)	45 (113)
Mean daily maximum °C (°F)	19.8 (67.6)	21.2 (70.2)	24.5 (76.1)	28.1 (82.6)	32.3 (90.1)	37.2 (99.0)	35.0 (95.0)	33.8 (92.8)	32.8 (91.0)	29.4 (84.9)	23.8 (74.8)	19.3 (66.7)	28.1 (82.6)
Daily mean °C (°F)	9.6 (49.3)	10.9 (51.6)	13.4 (56.1)	16.3 (61.3)	20.1 (68.2)	25.6 (78.1)	26.8 (80.2)	25.9 (78.6)	23.8 (74.8)	18.4 (65.1)	13.0 (55.4)	9.4 (48.9)	17.8 (64.0)
Mean daily minimum °C (°F)	−0.6 (30.9)	0.5 (32.9)	2.4 (36.3)	4.5 (40.1)	7.8 (46.0)	13.9 (57.0)	18.6 (65.5)	18.0 (64.4)	14.8 (58.6)	7.5 (45.5)	2.1 (35.8)	−0.4 (31.3)	7.4 (45.3)
Record low °C (°F)	−12 (10)	−13.5 (7.7)	−6 (21)	−4 (25)	−1 (30)	3 (37)	2 (36)	2 (36)	5 (41)	−5 (23)	−8 (18)	−9 (16)	−13.5 (7.7)
Average precipitation mm (inches)	30.0 (1.18)	22.8 (0.90)	16.7 (0.66)	3.5 (0.14)	2.9 (0.11)	15.9 (0.63)	138.7 (5.46)	105.9 (4.17)	49.9 (1.96)	24.5 (0.96)	26.3 (1.04)	28.8 (1.13)	465.9 (18.34)
Average rainy days	2.9	2.9	2.0	0.7	0.8	2.8	12.0	10.1	4.7	2.1	1.8	2.9	45.7
Source: Servicio Meteorológico Nacional

== Sources consulted ==
- INEGI
- Enciclopedia de los Municipios de Mexico
