= Carlos Alberto Navarro Sugich =

Mexican politician

- Born: 18 January 1975 (age 51); Hermosillo, Sonora, Mexico
- Occupation: Politician
- Political party: PAN

Carlos Alberto Navarro Sugich (born 18 January 1975) is a Mexican politician from the National Action Party (PAN). From 2006 to 2009 he served as a federal deputy in the 60th session of Congress, representing Sonora's second district.
