= Ignacio Molarja =

Ignacio Molarja, or known in the Jesuit dictionaries as Ignacio Molarsa (Caller, Cerdeña, Italy, 1610 – Tecoripa, Sonora, Mexico, 24 November 1658) was an explorer and Jesuit missionary pertaining to the Society of Jesus of the Province of Nueva España. The surname of the Italian Jesuit varies according to the diversity of the biographical writings on him, varying between "Molar Ja", "Molarja", "Molargia", "Molarsa", and "Molarza". He has also been confused by contemporary dictionaries with Jerónimo de la Canal, who was one of his coworkers at the mission. Ignacio Molarja began his Catholic studies in 1635, and arrived in northwest New Spain in 1644. As an explorer, missionary and evangelizer, he founded several missions in what is today the state of Sonora, Mexico. He died due to health problems in 1658 in Tecoripa, La Colorada Municipality, Sonora.

== Life as missionary ==
=== Beginnings and arrival in New Spain ===
He joined the Society of Jesus when he was 25 years old in the same province where he was born in 1635. He began to work on 3 July 1644, and in this same year he began his trip with Felipe Esgrecho as a missionary to New Spain. As New Spain was located in modern-day Mexico, they explored the zone of the Western State, also called Sonora or Sinaloa, first working with the Ópata ethnic group for the rectorship of San Francisco of Borja, as this village was previously converted by the Franciscans. In 1646 he founded the Jesuit mission of Our Lady of Assumption of Arizpe, as well as the guest village of Mission San Ignacio de Soniquipa. Then the provisional Father Pedro de Velasco sent Molarja, Juan Uter, and Francisco Maluenda to continue their missions, giving Molarja the villages that remained in the Valley of Sonora, which were Arizpe, Chinapa, and Vacobuchi.

After the death of Father Francisco Oliñano in 1647, the missionary Baltasar Xavier Loaisa took charge of all the missions previously directed by Olidaño, but because the missions territory was extensive, Olidaño only took charge of the missions on the eastern side of the Yaqui River, which were only Ónabas and Tecoripa. Thus the visiting Pedro Pantoja made Molarja in charge of the missions on the western side of the river, which were Rebeico, Soyopa and Suaqui.

=== Conflict with the Pimas Altos ===
In 1649, there was an uprising in the indigenous village of the Pimas Altos, and Father Molarja had to ask for help from Captain Simón Lazo de la Vega. Lazo de la Vega was accompanied by Fathers Pedro Pantoja and Jerónimo de la Canal (Canal had helped with founding the Arizpe mission), and they took the necessary repressive measures against the Pima village, controlling them in an effective way.

=== Retreat from the Arizpe mission and a death threat ===
In 1651 Molarja left the Arizpe mission and replaced Father Juan de Mendoza at the Cumuripa mission, while still remaining at the Tecoripa and Suaqui missions. In 1651–53, with Jerónimo de la Canal, they arrived at the Cucubarunich village, which was a village where the Pimas had sent them to kill the people, but there were no results since the Pimas were on the same side as the Jesuits. This same year, Molarja rejoined the Jesuits from his native Italy, of which he had strayed away a bit, and in a few months he became Father Francisco Paris' successor at the Ures mission. Two years later, in 1655, he went to Arizpe together with De la Cana. He received a letter from Rome, written by the General Father Gosvino Nickel on 24 January which was received by the provisional Father Juan del Real during the middle of the same year, which read:

"And in the Tepotzotlán apprenticeship, after Father Oracio Carochi's three year stay, if Father Igncacio de Molarja, who has established himself as a rector and as a training teacher, if he would be impeded, then It would be Father Pedro de Valencia. With him does the patents of his services.^{[9]} "

-Gosvino Nickel

=== Change to Cumuripa and death ===
In 1658, Ignacio Molarja took charge of the Cumuripa village mission, and also continued with the Suaqui and Tecoripa missions, which belonged to the general mission of San Francisco of Borja, and even though the witch doctors were against him, the Father began to work with the Indian boys to sing prayers and ask for Divine Mercy; then several heavy rains occurred, which did a lot of damage. That year, Father Molarja began having multiple health problems, and remained in bed for several weeks in Tecoripa. On 24 November 1658, he died, and was buried in Tecoripa. Father Prudencio Mesa, who was visiting the area, took charge of his missions. A year later, Father Gosvino Nickel wrote and sent another letter to the missionary Alonso Bonifacio from Rome:

"It has been written, an allowance has been taken by the parishioners of the San Francisco de Javier church, an exceptional altar has been requested for Father Ignacio Molarja, please give or send it to us."

-Gosvino Nickel

Informing him that an altar would be built for the dead missionary.

== See also ==
- Society of Jesus
- Arizpe
