= 1928 Mexican general election =

- 1 July 1928
- Presidential election
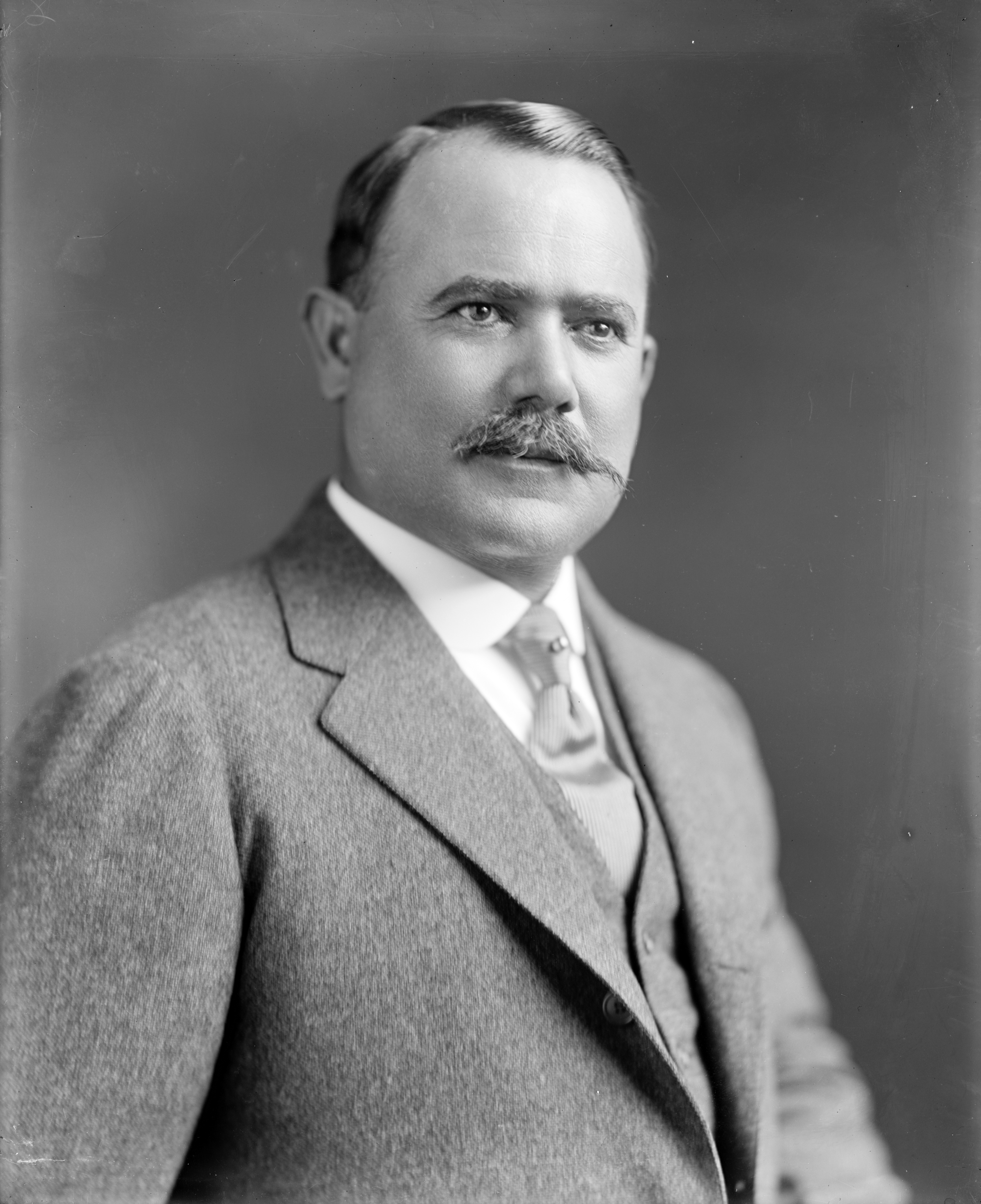
Nominee	Álvaro Obregón
Party	Laborist
Popular vote	1,670,453
Percentage	100%
President before election
Plutarco Elías Calles
Laborist
Elected President
Álvaro Obregón assassinated
Emilio Portes Gil (PNR) became President

General elections were held in Mexico on 1 July 1928. Alvaro Obregón was the only candidate in the presidential elections, and was elected unopposed. He was assassinated just 16 days later, and Emilio Portes Gil was appointed to serve as interim president in his place.

== Results ==
=== President ===
Candidate	Party	Votes	%
Alvaro Obregón	Laborist Party	1,670,453	100.00
Total		1,670,453	100.00
Source: Nohlen

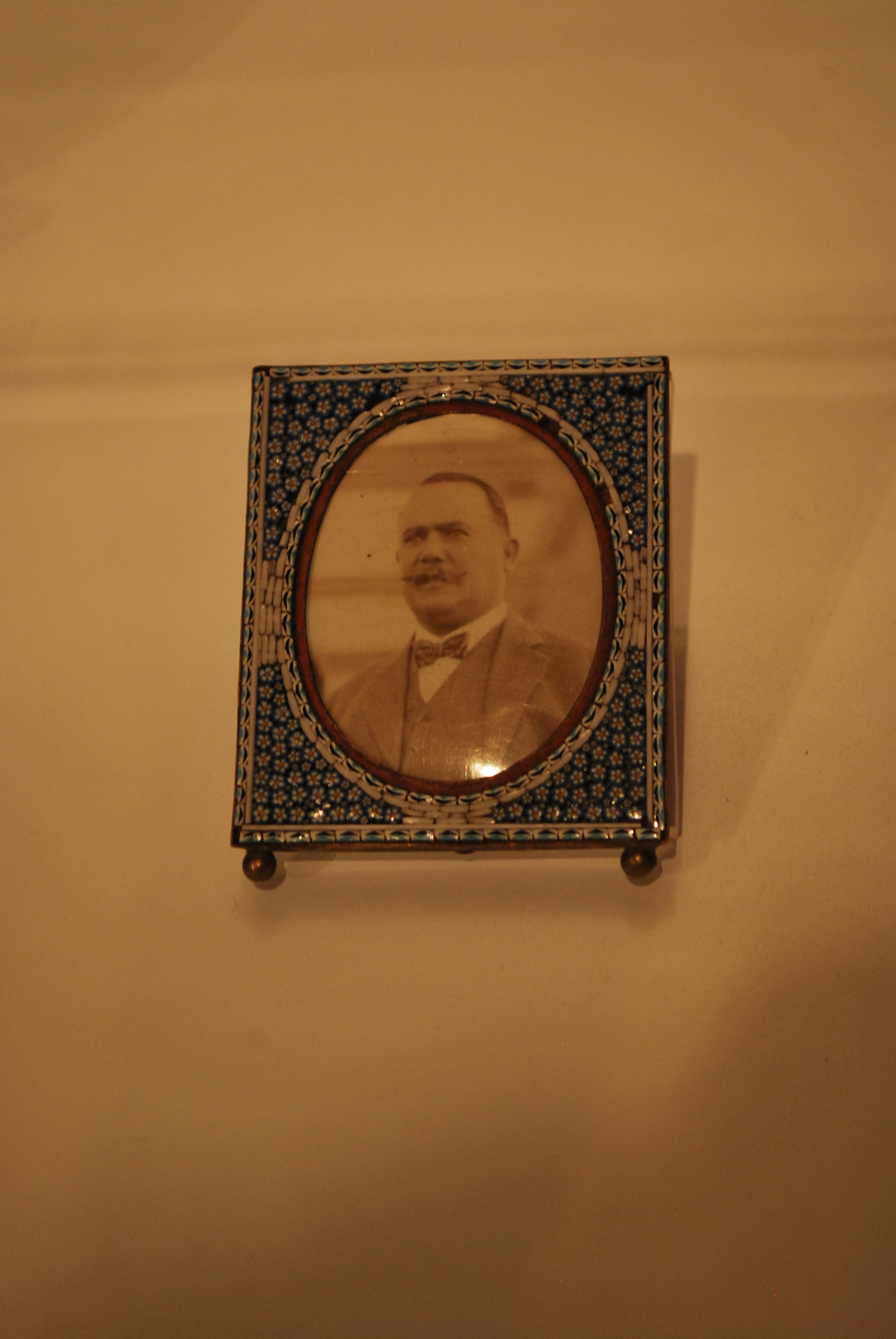
An Obregón campaign item.

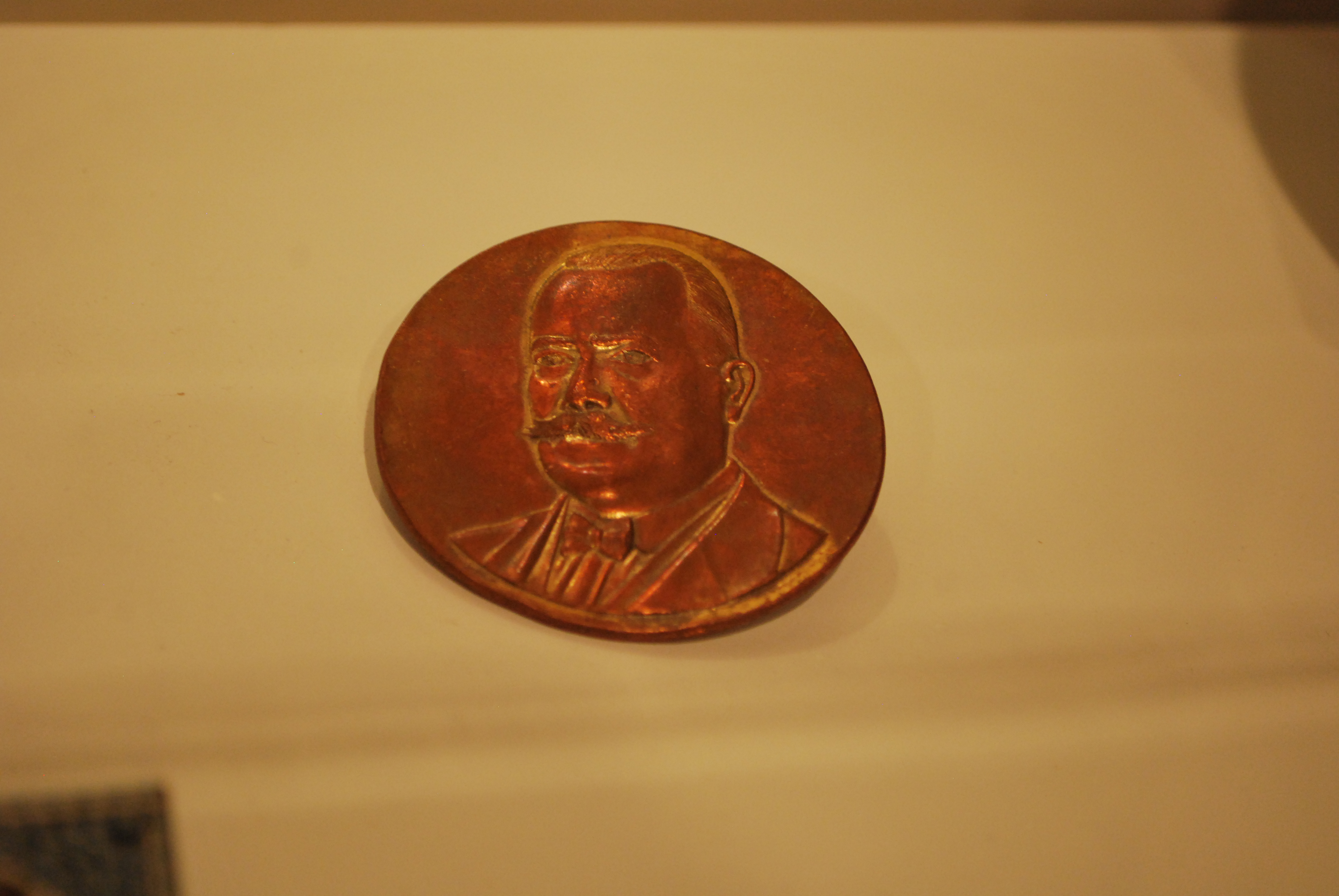
Obregón campaign item.
