= Santa Cruz Municipality, Sonora =

Santa Cruz
- Municipality
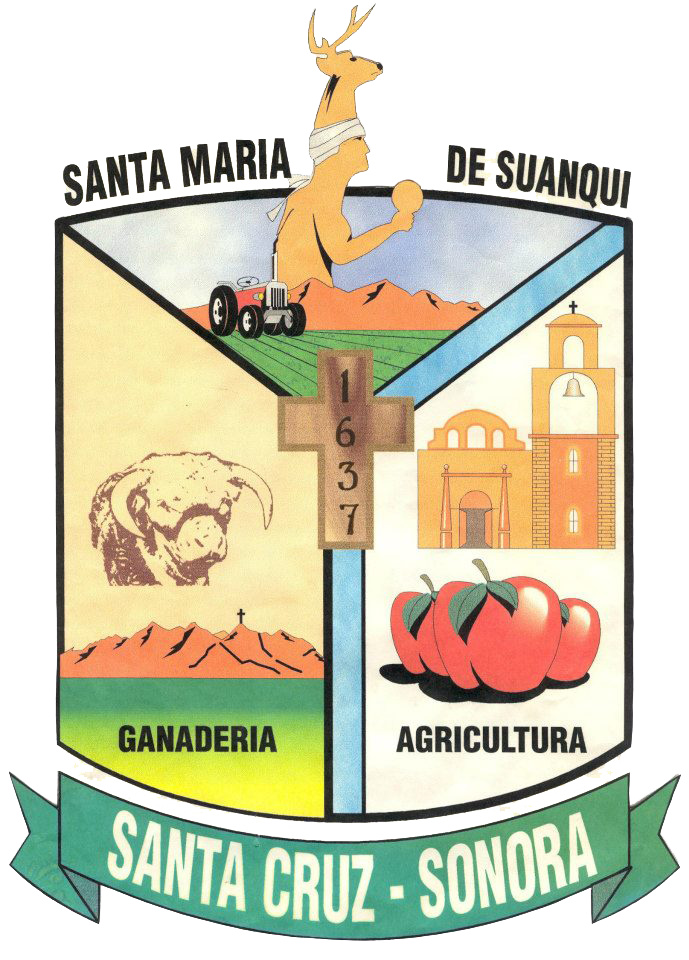
- Coat of arms

- Location of the municipality in Sonora

- Location in Mexico Santa Cruz (Mexico)
- Coordinates: 31.2085°N 110.5770°W
- Country: Mexico
- State: Sonora
- Seat: Santa Cruz

Population (2010)
  - Total: 1,998
- Time zone: UTC–07:00 (Zona Pacífico)
- Area code: +52 645

Santa Cruz is a municipality in the state of Sonora in northwestern Mexico. The municipal seat is at Santa Cruz, Sonora.

== Geography ==
=== Adjacent municipalities and counties ===
- Cananea - east and southeast
- Ímuris - southwest
- Nogales - west
- Santa Cruz County, Arizona - north
- Cochise County, Arizona - northeast

=== Towns and villages ===
The largest localities (cities, towns, and villages) are:

Name	2010 Census Population
Santa Cruz	1,038
Miguel Hidalgo (San Lázaro)	640
Milpillas	172
Total Municipality	1,998
