= Santa Cruz, Sonora =

Santa Cruz
- Town and Municipality
- Location within Sonora Location within Mexico
- Coordinates: 31°14′01″N 110°35′43″W
- Country: Mexico
- State: Sonora
- Municipality: Santa Cruz

Government
  - Mayor: Ivonne Lorta Ortega
- Elevation: 1,360 m (4,460 ft)

Population (2010)
  - Total: 1,038
- Time zone: UTC–07:00 (Zona Pacífico)
- Area code: +52 645

Santa Cruz is a town in Santa Cruz Municipality, in the northern region of the Mexican state of Sonora.
