= 1920 Mexican general election =

← 1917	5 September 1920	1924 →
- Presidential election
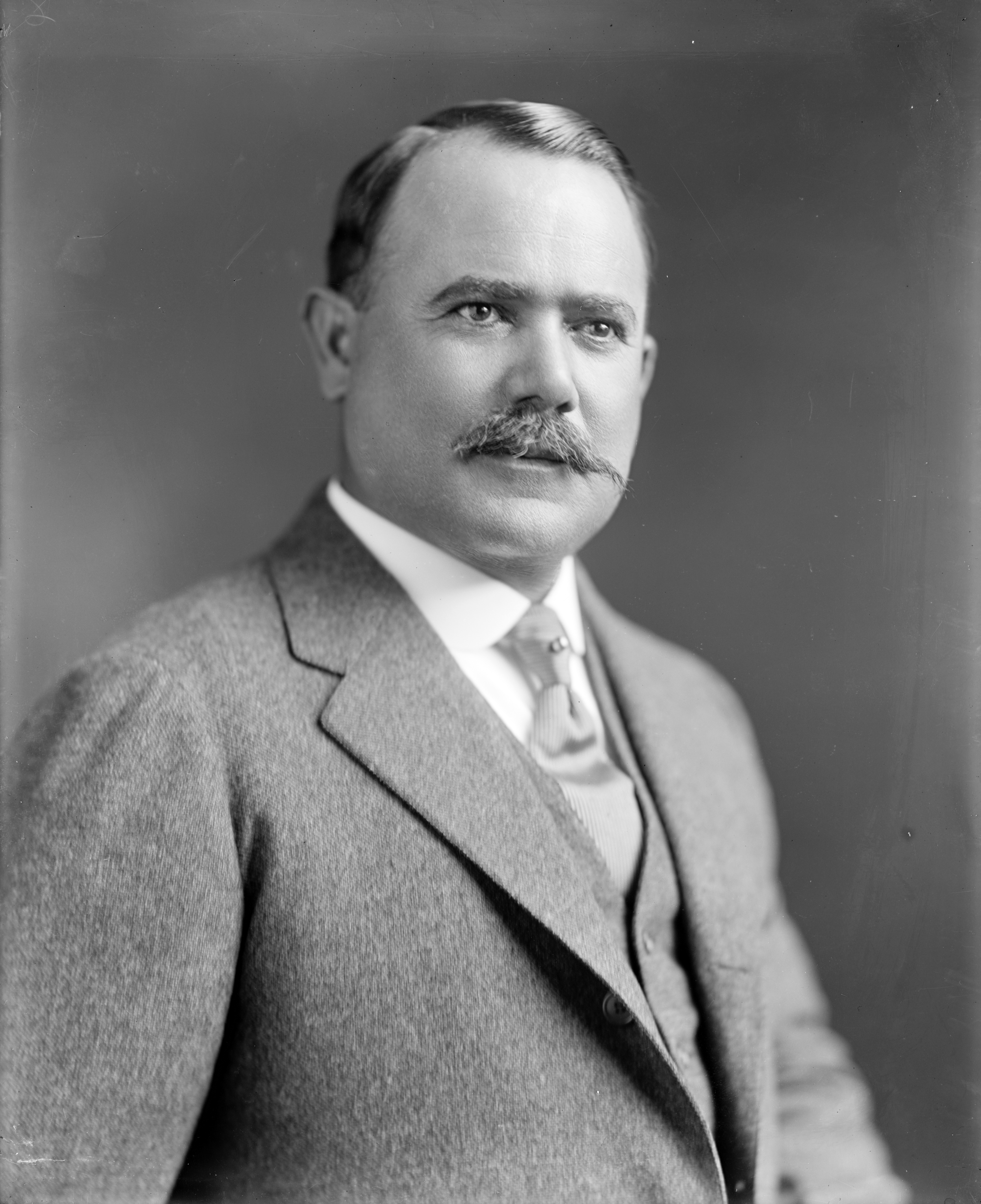

Nominee	Álvaro Obregón	Alfredo Robles Domínguez
Party	Laborist	Nationalist Republican
Popular vote	1,131,751	47,442
Percentage	95.79%	4.02%
President before election
Adolfo de la Huerta
Liberal Constitutionalist
Elected President
Álvaro Obregón
Laborist

General elections were held in Mexico on 5 September 1920. In the presidential election the result was a victory for Álvaro Obregón, who received 96% of the vote. Obregón was inaugurated on December 1.

== Results ==
=== President ===
Candidate	Party	Votes	%
Álvaro Obregón	Laborist Party	1,131,751	95.79
Alfredo Robles Domínguez	Nationalist Republican Party	47,442	4.02
Other candidates		2,357	0.20
Total		1,181,550	100.00
Source: Nohlen
