= Ímuris =

Imuris
- Municipality
- Location in Mexico Imuris (Mexico)
- Coordinates: 30°47′0″N 110°52′0″W
- Country: Mexico
- State: Sonora
- Elevation: 835 m (2,740 ft)

Population (2001 est.)
  - Total: 9,921
- Time zone: UTC–07:00 (Zona Pacífico)

Imuris is the municipal seat of Imuris Municipality in the north of the Mexican state of Sonora.

== Location ==
Imuris is located along Federal Highway 15 - the long highway between Nogales at the USA/Mexico border and Mexico City - and the railroad line connecting Nogales and the USA into the Mexican railroad network. It is also the intersection with the eastbound section of Federal Highway 2, which heads to the state of Chihuahua and the city of Ciudad Juárez (across the Río Grande from El Paso, Texas).

== History ==
In 1687 the Jesuit missionaries Eusebio Francisco Kino and José Aguilar established the mission town of San José de Imuris, taking the name from the local Hímeris people. The toponym of Imuris is Pima and a possible meaning is "Plateau between rivers" or "hills shaped like flint".

Jesuit missionary Pedro Sandoval was stationed at Ímuris in 1690, and Franciscan missionary Pedro Font served there in 1776.

== Geography ==
The land is mountainous in the east and north and the main settlement lies at an elevation of 826 metres (2,710 ft). The average annual temperature is 18.7 °C (65.7 °F) and the average annual rainfall is 413.1 millimetres (16.26 in).

The region is crossed by three small rivers, which later form the Rio Magdalena.

=== Climate ===
Climate data for Ímuris (1991–2020 normals, extremes 1944–present)
Month	Jan	Feb	Mar	Apr	May	Jun	Jul	Aug	Sep	Oct	Nov	Dec	Year
Record high °C (°F)	40 (104)	41 (106)	38 (100)	41 (106)	46 (115)	50 (122)	49 (120)	46 (115)	47 (117)	44 (111)	40 (104)	40 (104)	50 (122)
Mean daily maximum °C (°F)	21.6 (70.9)	22.6 (72.7)	25.7 (78.3)	29.1 (84.4)	33.5 (92.3)	38.2 (100.8)	37.0 (98.6)	36.0 (96.8)	34.9 (94.8)	31.4 (88.5)	25.9 (78.6)	20.8 (69.4)	29.7 (85.5)
Daily mean °C (°F)	11.9 (53.4)	13.0 (55.4)	15.5 (59.9)	18.3 (64.9)	22.2 (72.0)	27.0 (80.6)	28.5 (83.3)	27.7 (81.9)	25.6 (78.1)	20.7 (69.3)	15.5 (59.9)	11.4 (52.5)	19.8 (67.6)
Mean daily minimum °C (°F)	2.2 (36.0)	3.4 (38.1)	5.4 (41.7)	7.6 (45.7)	10.9 (51.6)	15.8 (60.4)	19.9 (67.8)	19.4 (66.9)	16.3 (61.3)	10.1 (50.2)	5.0 (41.0)	2.1 (35.8)	9.8 (49.6)
Record low °C (°F)	−11 (12)	−9 (16)	−9 (16)	−3 (27)	0 (32)	5 (41)	6 (43)	5 (41)	1 (34)	−4.5 (23.9)	−7 (19)	−12 (10)	−12 (10)
Average precipitation mm (inches)	28.2 (1.11)	31.4 (1.24)	18.8 (0.74)	6.6 (0.26)	2.5 (0.10)	14.3 (0.56)	94.8 (3.73)	99.3 (3.91)	62.6 (2.46)	20.8 (0.82)	19.7 (0.78)	33.0 (1.30)	432.0 (17.01)
Average rainy days	3.4	3.3	2.5	1.0	0.6	2.4	10.8	10.0	6.1	2.3	2.0	3.4	47.8
Source: Servicio Meteorológico Nacional

== Economy ==
Agriculture, cattle raising, and industry are the main economic activities.

Corn and beans are raised for subsistence while grasses (sorghum, alfalfa, rye grass) are grown for cattle fodder. There were 353 small land owners in 2000 cultivating a surface of 3,706 hectares (9,160 acres), and 937 ejidatarios on 673 hectares (1,660 acres), making a total of 4,378.9 hectares (10,820 acres).

The cattle herd numbered 25,617 head in 2000, with this activity employing 638 people.

The industrial sector is varied because there are two maquiladoras owned by international companies, as well as several small factories producing construction materials. Almost 1000 jobs are generated by the industrial sector making it the most important economic activity of the municipality. The final products of the maquiladoras are automobile belts, automobile electronic panels, transformers, plastic packaging, and smelting of aluminum.

The main tourist attraction is the Iglesia de San José de Ímuris, as well as the traditional plaza, and the typical restaurants, locally known for fine quesadillas and their world class tacos.
