= Bacoachi Municipality =

Coordinates: 30.6532°N 109.9790°W

Bacoachi
- Municipality
- Coat of arms
- Interactive map of Bacoachi
- Country: Mexico
- State: Sonora
- Municipal seat: Bacoachi

Population (2020)
  - Total: 1,475
- Time zone: UTC-07:00 (Zona Pacífico)

Bacoachi is a municipality in the state of Sonora in north-western Mexico. The municipal seat is at Bacoachi.

== Towns and villages ==
There are 39 localities in the municipality of Bacoachi, the largest of which are:

Name	2020 Census Population
Bacoachi	1,036
Unámichi	239
Cañada de la Cruz	46
Mututicachi	30
Chaparaco Nuevo	13
Bajío de Nuestra Señora de Guadalupe	12
Total municipality	1,475
