= Fronteras Municipality =

Coordinates: 30.8215°N 109.6062°W

Fronteras
- Municipality
- Coat of arms

- Location of the municipality in Sonora
- Country: Mexico
- State: Sonora
- Municipal seat: Fronteras

Population (2020)
  - Total: 9,041
- Time zone: UTC-07:00 (Zona Pacífico)

Fronteras is a municipality in the state of Sonora in north-western Mexico. In the 2020 Census, the municipality reported a total population of 9,041.

The municipal seat stands at Fronteras.

== Towns and villages ==
There are 71 localities in the municipality of Fronteras, the largest of which are:

Name	2020 Census Population
Esqueda	7,240
Fronteras	806
Turicachi	471
Kilómetro Cuarenta y Siete	96
Alfonso Ruíz Cortinez	90
Cuquiarachi	87
La Reforma	43
Total Municipality	9,041
