= Area codes in Mexico by code (600–699) =

The 600–699 range of area codes in Mexico is reserved for the states of Baja California, Baja California Sur, Chihuahua, Durango, Sinaloa, and Sonora. The country code of Mexico is 52.

For other areas, see Area codes in Mexico by code.

City	State	Code	Ref.
Chametla	Baja California Sur	612	
El Centenario	Baja California Sur	612	
El Pescadero	Baja California Sur	612	
El Sargento	Baja California Sur	612	
La Paz	Baja California Sur	612	
San Juan de los Planes	Baja California Sur	612	
Todos Santos	Baja California Sur	612	
Benito Juárez (Buenavista)	Baja California Sur	613	
Ciudad Constitución	Baja California Sur	613	
Loreto	Baja California Sur	613	
Nopolo	Baja California Sur	613	
Puerto Adolfo López Mateos	Baja California Sur	613	
Puerto San Carlos	Baja California Sur	613	
Villa Ignacio Zaragoza (Las Flores)	Baja California Sur	613	
Villa Insurgentes	Baja California Sur	613	
Chihuahua	Chihuahua	614	
El Sauz	Chihuahua	614	
San Andrés	Chihuahua	614	
Santa Eulalia	Chihuahua	614	
Santa Isabel	Chihuahua	614	
Satevo	Chihuahua	614	
Villa Aldama	Chihuahua	614	
Bahia Asunción	Baja California Sur	615	
Bahía Tortugas	Baja California Sur	615	
Estero de la Bocana	Baja California Sur	615	
Guerrero Negro	Baja California Sur	615	
Gustavo Díaz Ordaz (Vizcaíno)	Baja California Sur	615	
Mulegé	Baja California Sur	615	
Punta Abreojos	Baja California Sur	615	
San Bruno	Baja California Sur	615	
San Ignacio	Baja California Sur	615	
San Lucas	Baja California Sur	615	
Santa Rosalía	Baja California Sur	615	
Villa Alberto A. Alvarado A. (El Fundo Legal)	Baja California	615	
Camalú	Baja California	616	
Colonia Vicente Guerrero	Baja California	616	
Ejido General Leandro Valle	Baja California	616	
Ejido José María Morelos	Baja California	616	
El Rosario	Baja California	616	
Isla de Cedros	Baja California	616	
Poblado Héroes de Chapultepec	Baja California	616	
Punta Cólonet	Baja California	616	
Ruben Jaramillo	Baja California	616	
San Quintín	Baja California	616	
Venustiano Carranza (Santa María)	Baja California	616	
Cinco de Febrero	Durango	618	
Colonia Hidalgo	Durango	618	
Durango	Durango	618	
El Arenal (San Jerónimo)	Durango	618	
El Nayar	Durango	618	
José María Pino Suárez	Durango	618	
José Refugio Salcido	Durango	618	
Llano Grande	Durango	618	
Praxedis G. Guerrero	Durango	618	
Santiago Bayacora	Durango	618	
Sebastíán Lerdo de Tejada	Durango	618	
Villa Montemorelos	Durango	618	
Julimes	Chihuahua	621	
Naica	Chihuahua	621	
Santa Gertrudis (La Hacienda)	Chihuahua	621	
Saucillo	Chihuahua	621	
Empalme	Sonora	622	
Fraccionamiento Nuevo Empalme	Sonora	622	
Guaymas	Sonora	622	
José María Morelos y Pavón	Sonora	622	
Ortiz	Sonora	622	
San Carlos Nuevo Guaymas	Sonora	622	
Aconchi	Sonora	623	
Banámichi	Sonora	623	
Baviácora	Sonora	623	
Carbó	Sonora	623	
Guadalupe de Ures	Sonora	623	
Huepac	Sonora	623	
Mazatán	Sonora	623	
Pesqueira	Sonora	623	
Pueblo de Alamos	Sonora	623	
Rayón	Sonora	623	
San Pedro de la Cueva	Sonora	623	
Ures	Sonora	623	
Villa Pesqueira	Sonora	623	
Yécora	Sonora	623	
Buena Vista	Baja California Sur	624	
Cabo del Sol	Baja California Sur	624	
Cabo San Lucas	Baja California Sur	624	
La Ribera	Baja California Sur	624	
Las Lagunitas	Baja California Sur	624	
Miraflores	Baja California Sur	624	
San José del Cabo	Baja California Sur	624	
San José Viejo	Baja California Sur	624	
Santa Anita	Baja California Sur	624	
Santiago	Baja California Sur	624	
Campo Menonita Número 106	Chihuahua	625	
Campo Número Ciento Uno Viejo	Chihuahua	625	
Campo Número Cientosiete	Chihuahua	625	
Campo Número Diez	Chihuahua	625	
Campo Número Ocho	Chihuahua	625	
Campo Número Seis y Medio B	Chihuahua	625	
Campo Número Veinte	Chihuahua	625	
Campo Número Veintidós	Chihuahua	625	
Ciudad Cuauhtémoc	Chihuahua	625	
Colonia Alvaro Obregón	Chihuahua	625	
Colonia Anáhuac	Chihuahua	625	
La Paz	Chihuahua	625	
Lázaro Cárdenas	Chihuahua	625	
San Lorenzo	Chihuahua	625	
San Nicolás de Carretas	Chihuahua	625	
Santa Bárbara de Tutuaca (Tutuaca)	Chihuahua	625	
Santa Rosalía de Cuevas	Chihuahua	625	
Coyame	Chihuahua	626	
Manuel Benavides	Chihuahua	626	
Manuel Ojinaga	Chihuahua	626	
Parral	Chihuahua	627	
Mariano Matamoros	Chihuahua	628	
Pueblito de Allende	Chihuahua	628	
San Francisco del Oro	Chihuahua	628	
Santa Bárbara	Chihuahua	628	
Valle de Ignacio Allende	Chihuahua	628	
Ciudad Jiménez	Chihuahua	629	
Escalón	Chihuahua	629	
José Esteban Coronado	Chihuahua	629	
Salaices	Chihuahua	629	
Santa María	Chihuahua	629	
Villa López	Chihuahua	629	
Ceballos	Durango	629	
Ejido Revolución (Las Víboras)	Durango	629	
Villa Hidalgo	Durango	629	
Cibuta	Sonora	631	
Nogales	Sonora	631	
Ímuris	Sonora	632	
Magdalena de Kino	Sonora	632	
San Ignacio	Sonora	632	
Terrenate	Sonora	632	
Agua Prieta	Sonora	633	
Esqueda	Sonora	633	
Fronteras	Sonora	633	
Naco	Sonora	633	
Arivechi	Sonora	634	
Arizpe	Sonora	634	
Bacadéhuachi	Sonora	634	
Bacerac	Sonora	634	
Bavispe	Sonora	634	
Colonia El Tajo	Sonora	634	
Cumpas	Sonora	634	
Huachinera	Sonora	634	
Huasabas	Sonora	634	
La Caridad (Fracción G)	Sonora	634	
Los Abanicos	Sonora	634	
Los Globos	Sonora	634	
Moctezuma	Sonora	634	
Nacori Chico	Sonora	634	
Nacozari	Sonora	634	
Sahuaripa	Sonora	634	
Tepache	Sonora	634	
Villa Hidalgo	Sonora	634	
Areponapuchi	Chihuahua	635	
Bahuichivo	Chihuahua	635	
Basaseachi	Chihuahua	635	
Basuchil	Chihuahua	635	
Bocoyna	Chihuahua	635	
Carichi	Chihuahua	635	
Cerocahui	Chihuahua	635	
Chinpas de Almada	Chihuahua	635	
Creel	Chihuahua	635	
El Terrero	Chihuahua	635	
Lic. Adolfo López Mateos	Chihuahua	635	
Moris	Chihuahua	635	
Nonoava	Chihuahua	635	
Pascual Orozco (San Isidro)	Chihuahua	635	
San Francisco de Borja	Chihuahua	635	
San Juanito	Chihuahua	635	
San Rafael	Chihuahua	635	
Santo Tomás	Chihuahua	635	
Sisoguichi	Chihuahua	635	
Temoris	Chihuahua	635	
Tomochi	Chihuahua	635	
Urique	Chihuahua	635	
Uruachi	Chihuahua	635	
Vicente Guerrero	Chihuahua	635	
Benito Juárez	Chihuahua	636	
Buenos Aires	Chihuahua	636	
Casa de Janos	Chihuahua	636	
Casas Grandes	Chihuahua	636	
Colonia El Valle	Chihuahua	636	
Colonia Juárez	Chihuahua	636	
Colonia Le Barón	Chihuahua	636	
Colonia Madero	Chihuahua	636	
Ejido Constitución	Chihuahua	636	
El Bismarck	Chihuahua	636	
Galeana	Chihuahua	636	
Guadalupe Victoria	Chihuahua	636	
Ejido Hidalgo	Chihuahua	636	
Ignacio Allende	Chihuahua	636	
Ignacio Zaragoza	Chihuahua	636	
Janos	Chihuahua	636	
Juan Mata Ortíz (Pearson)	Chihuahua	636	
La Ascensión	Chihuahua	636	
Las Virginias	Chihuahua	636	
Monte Verde (El Coyote)	Chihuahua	636	
Nuevo Casas Grandes	Chihuahua	636	
Pancho Villa (La Morita)	Chihuahua	636	
Ricardo Flores Magón (El Carmen)	Chihuahua	636	
Rodrigo M. Quevedo	Chihuahua	636	
San Buenaventura	Chihuahua	636	
San Lorenzo	Chihuahua	636	
Sección Enríquez	Chihuahua	636	
Tres Alamos	Chihuahua	636	
Altar	Sonora	637	
Atil	Sonora	637	
Caborca	Sonora	637	
Pitiquito	Sonora	637	
Plutarco Elías Calles Dos (La Y Griega)	Sonora	637	
Puerto Libertad	Sonora	637	
Sáric	Sonora	637	
Sasabe	Sonora	637	
Tubutama	Sonora	637	
La Choya	Sonora	638	
Puerto Peñasco	Sonora	638	
Ciudad Delicias	Chihuahua	639	
Colonia Campesina	Chihuahua	639	
Colonia Felipe Angeles	Chihuahua	639	
Colonia Revolución	Chihuahua	639	
El Molino	Chihuahua	639	
Estación Consuelo	Chihuahua	639	
Guadalupe Victoria	Chihuahua	639	
Kilometro Noventa y Nueve	Chihuahua	639	
Las Varas	Chihuahua	639	
Lázaro Cárdenas	Chihuahua	639	
Pedro Meoqui	Chihuahua	639	
Santa Cruz de Rosales	Chihuahua	639	
Benjamin Hill	Sonora	641	
El Claro	Sonora	641	
Estación Llano	Sonora	641	
Querobabi	Sonora	641	
Santa Ana	Sonora	641	
Trincheras	Sonora	641	
Bacabachi	Sonora	642	
Chinotahueca	Sonora	642	
Masiaca	Sonora	642	
Navojoa	Sonora	642	
Pueblo Mayo	Sonora	642	
Agua Blanca	Sonora	643	
Buaysiacobe	Sonora	643	
Colonia Jecopaco	Sonora	643	
Ejido 31 de Octubre	Sonora	643	
Ejido Francisco Javier Mina	Sonora	643	
Jecopaco	Sonora	643	
Pótam	Sonora	643	
Primero de Mayo (Campo 77)	Sonora	643	
Pueblo Yaqui	Sonora	643	
Quetchehueca	Sonora	643	
San Ignacio Río Muerto (Colonia Militar)	Sonora	643	
San José de Bacum	Sonora	643	
Vícam	Sonora	643	
Villa Juárez	Sonora	643	
Bácum	Sonora	644	
Ciudad Obregón	Sonora	644	
Ejido Cuauhtémoc (Campo Cinco)	Sonora	644	
Esperanza	Sonora	644	
Los Hornos	Sonora	644	
Marte R. Gómez (Tobarito)	Sonora	644	
Paredón Colorado (Paredón Viejo)	Sonora	644	
Providencia	Sonora	644	
Bacoachi	Sonora	645	
Cananea	Sonora	645	
Santa Cruz	Sonora	645	
Bajamar	Baja California	646	
Colonia Benito García (El Zorrillo)	Baja California	646	
El Porvenir (Guadalupe)	Baja California	646	
El Sauzal de Rodríguez	Baja California	646	
Ensenada	Baja California	646	
Erendira	Baja California	646	
Francisco R. Serrano (Valle San Matías)	Baja California	646	
Héroes de la Independencia	Baja California	646	
La Bufadora	Baja California	646	
La Misión	Baja California	646	
Lázaro Cárdenas (Valle de la Trinidad)	Baja California	646	
Maneadero	Baja California	646	
Nacionalista de Sánchez Taboada	Baja California	646	
Ojos Negros (Real del Castillo)	Baja California	646	
El Rincón de Punta Banda	Baja California	646	
San Vicente	Baja California	646	
Santo Tomás	Baja California	646	
Uruapan	Baja California	646	
Valle de la Trinidad	Baja California	646	
Villa de Juárez, Baja California (San Antonio de las Minas)	Baja California	646	
Álamos	Sonora	647	
Became Nuevo	Sonora	647	
Bacobampo	Sonora	647	
El Chucarit	Sonora	647	
Etchojoa	Sonora	647	
Etchoropo	Sonora	647	
Huatabampo	Sonora	647	
Quiriego	Sonora	647	
Rosario Tesopaco	Sonora	647	
Yávaros (Isla Las Viejas)	Sonora	647	
Ciudad Camargo	Chihuahua	648	
La Boquilla del Conchos	Chihuahua	648	
La Cruz	Chihuahua	648	
La Perla	Chihuahua	648	
San Francisco de Conchos	Chihuahua	648	
Baborigame	Chihuahua	649	
Batopilas	Chihuahua	649	
El Tule	Chihuahua	649	
Ejido El Vergel	Chihuahua	649	
Guachochi	Chihuahua	649	
Guadalupe y Calvo	Chihuahua	649	
La Magdalena	Chihuahua	649	
Las Yerbitas	Chihuahua	649	
Mesa San Rafael	Chihuahua	649	
San Pablo Balleza	Chihuahua	649	
Valle de Zaragoza	Chihuahua	649	
Canutillo	Durango	649	
General Escobedo	Durango	649	
Indé	Durango	649	
Las Nieves	Durango	649	
San Bernardo	Durango	649	
Santa María del Oro	Durango	649	
Torreón de Cañas	Durango	649	
Villa Ocampo	Durango	649	
Villa Orestes Pereyra (Rosario)	Durango	649	
Sonoyta	Sonora	651	
Ciudad Madera	Chihuahua	652	
Ejido El Largo	Chihuahua	652	
La Norteña	Chihuahua	652	
La Pinta	Chihuahua	652	
Mesa del Huracán	Chihuahua	652	
Nicolás Bravo	Chihuahua	652	
Nueva Madera	Chihuahua	652	
Peña Blanca	Chihuahua	652	
San José Babicora	Chihuahua	652	
Valentín Gómez Farías	Chihuahua	652	
Estación Coahuila	Baja California	653	
Ejido Lagunitas	Sonora	653	
Golfo de Santa Clara	Sonora	653	
Independencia	Sonora	653	
Ingeniero Luis B. Sánchez	Sonora	653	
Islita	Sonora	653	
San Luis Río Colorado	Sonora	653	
Barreales	Chihuahua	656	
Ciudad Juárez	Chihuahua	656	
Doctor Porfirio Parra (La Caseta)	Chihuahua	656	
El Millón	Chihuahua	656	
El Porvenir	Chihuahua	656	
G. Rodrigo M. Quevedo (Pto. Palomas)	Chihuahua	656	
Guadalupe Distrito Bravos	Chihuahua	656	
Jesús Carranza (La Colorada)	Chihuahua	656	
Loma Blanca	Chihuahua	656	
Miguel Ahumada	Chihuahua	656	
Praxedis G. Guerrero	Chihuahua	656	
Samalayuca	Chihuahua	656	
San Isidro (Río Grande)	Chihuahua	656	
Benito Juárez (Tecolotes)	Baja California	658	
Ciudad Morelos (Cuervos)	Baja California	658	
Ejido Chiapas 1	Baja California	658	
Ejido Distrito Federal	Baja California	658	
Ejido Dr. Alberto Oviedo Mota (El Indiviso)	Baja California	658	
Ejido Guadalajara	Baja California	658	
Ejido Lázaro Cárdenas	Baja California	658	
Ejido Monterrey (Colonia Bataquez)	Baja California	658	
Ejido Querétaro	Baja California	658	
Ejido Quintana Roo	Baja California	658	
Ejido Yucatán	Baja California	658	
Guadalupe Victoria	Baja California	658	
Hermosillo	Baja California	658	
Ingeniero Francisco Murguía	Baja California	658	
Mérida	Baja California	658	
Paredones	Baja California	658	
República Mexicana	Baja California	658	
Saltillo	Baja California	658	
Vicente Guerrero (Los Algodones)	Baja California	658	
Villa Hermosa	Baja California	658	
Abraham González	Chihuahua	659	
Bachiniva	Chihuahua	659	
Campo 303	Chihuahua	659	
Campo 305 (Jagueyes)	Chihuahua	659	
Ejido Benito Juárez	Chihuahua	659	
El Molino	Chihuahua	659	
El Porvenir (Mpio. Bachiniva)	Chihuahua	659	
El Terrero	Chihuahua	659	
Independencia (Cologachi)	Chihuahua	659	
Matachic	Chihuahua	659	
Namiquipa	Chihuahua	659	
Oscar Soto Maynez	Chihuahua	659	
Temosachi	Chihuahua	659	
Marena Cove	Baja California	661	
Rosarito	Baja California	661	
Popotla	Baja California	661	
Primo Tapia	Baja California	661	
Bahía de Kino	Sonora	662	
Ejido La Victoria	Sonora	662	
Hermosillo	Sonora	662	
Miguel Alemán (La Doce)	Sonora	662	
San Pedro O Saucito (San Pedro El Saucito)	Sonora	662	
Ejido Ojo de Agua	Baja California	663 / 664	
San Antonio del Mar	Baja California	663 / 664	
Tijuana	Baja California	663 / 664	
Ejido Nueva Colonia Hindú	Baja California	665	
El Descanso	Baja California	665	
El Hongo	Baja California	665	
El Testerazo	Baja California	665	
Tecate	Baja California	665	
Valle de Las Palmas	Baja California	665	
Costa Rica	Sinaloa	667	
Culiacán	Sinaloa	667	
Culiacancito	Sinaloa	667	
Ejido El Quemadito	Sinaloa	667	
El Dorado	Sinaloa	667	
El Salado	Sinaloa	667	
Estación Rosales	Sinaloa	667	
Guadalupe Victoria	Sinaloa	667	
Higueras de Abuya	Sinaloa	667	
Limón de los Ramos	Sinaloa	667	
Oso Viejo	Sinaloa	667	
Pueblos Unidos	Sinaloa	667	
Quila	Sinaloa	667	
Sánchez Celis	Sinaloa	667	
Villa Adolfo López Mateos (El Tamarindo)	Sinaloa	667	
Ahome	Sinaloa	668	
Alfonso G. Calderón (Poblado 7)	Sinaloa	668	
Bachomobampo Número Dos	Sinaloa	668	
Bagojo Colectivo Emiliano Zapata	Sinaloa	668	
Cerrillos (Campo 35)	Sinaloa	668	
Chihuahuita	Sinaloa	668	
Cohuibampo	Sinaloa	668	
General Chávez Talamantes	Sinaloa	668	
Gustavo Díaz Ordaz (El Carrizo)	Sinaloa	668	
Higuera de Zaragoza	Sinaloa	668	
Las Grullas Margen Izquierdo	Sinaloa	668	
Los Mochis	Sinaloa	668	
Nueve de Diciembre	Sinaloa	668	
Poblado Número Cinco	Sinaloa	668	
Poblado Número Seis (Los Natoches)	Sinaloa	668	
Revolución Mexicana	Sinaloa	668	
San José de Ahome	Sinaloa	668	
San Miguel Zapotitlán	Sinaloa	668	
Topolobampo	Sinaloa	668	
El Castillo	Sinaloa	669	
El Habal	Sinaloa	669	
El Quelite	Sinaloa	669	
El Recodo	Sinaloa	669	
El Roble	Sinaloa	669	
Escamillas	Sinaloa	669	
Marmol de salcido (Marmol)	Sinaloa	669	
Mazatlán	Sinaloa	669	
Siqueros	Sinaloa	669	
Villa Unión	Sinaloa	669	
Mieleras	Coahuila	671	
Viesca	Coahuila	671	
Cuencame de Ceniceros	Durango	671	
Simón BolívarGeneral Simón Bolívar	Durango	671	
Las Mercedes	Durango	671	
Nazas	Durango	671	
Pasaje	Durango	671	
Paso Nacional	Durango	671	
Estación Pedriceña	Durango	671	
San Juan de Guadalupe	Durango	671	
San Luis del Cordero	Durango	671	
San Pedro del Gallo	Durango	671	
Santa Clara	Durango	671	
Velardeña	Durango	671	
Altata	Sinaloa	672	
Campo Balbuena	Sinaloa	672	
Dautillos	Sinaloa	672	
El Castillo	Sinaloa	672	
El Potrero de Sataya	Sinaloa	672	
Navolato	Sinaloa	672	
Villa Angel Flores	Sinaloa	672	
Villa Juárez	Sinaloa	672	
Benito Juárez	Sinaloa	673	
Cerro Agudo	Sinaloa	673	
Guamuchil	Sinaloa	673	
Mocorito	Sinaloa	673	
Canelas	Durango	674	
Ciénaga de Nuestra Señora de Guadalupe	Durango	674	
El Durazno	Durango	674	
Guanacevi	Durango	674	
José María Morelos (Chinacates)	Durango	674	
La Purísima	Durango	674	
Los Herrera	Durango	674	
Nuevo San Diego Tensaenz (El Caballo)	Durango	674	
Otaez	Durango	674	
San José de la Boca	Durango	674	
San Miguel de Cruces	Durango	674	
San Nicolás de Presidio (Presidio de Arriba)	Durango	674	
San Nicolás	Durango	674	
Santiago Papasquiaro	Durango	674	
Tamazula de Victoria	Durango	674	
Tayoltita	Durango	674	
Tepehuanes	Durango	674	
Topia	Durango	674	
Vencedores	Durango	674	
Cieneguilla	Durango	675	
El Salto	Durango	675	
Francisco Murguía	Durango	675	
Gabriel Hernández (Mancinas)	Durango	675	
Graceros	Durango	675	
La Ciudad	Durango	675	
La Constancia	Durango	675	
La Joya	Durango	675	
Los Ángeles	Durango	675	
Nombre de Dios	Durango	675	
Rojas	Durango	675	
San Francisco del Mezquital	Durango	675	
San Francisco Javier	Durango	675	
San José de la Parrilla	Durango	675	
San José de Tuitán	Durango	675	
Súchil	Durango	675	
Veracruz	Durango	675	
Vicente Guerrero	Durango	675	
Villa Unión	Durango	675	
Antonio Amaro	Durango	676	
Cuauhtémoc	Durango	676	
Emiliano Zapata	Durango	676	
General Calixto Contreras (Colo)	Durango	676	
General Jesús Agustín Castro (Independencia)	Durango	676	
Felipe Carrillo PuertoGral. Felipe Carrillo Puerto	Durango	676	
Guadalupe Victoria	Durango	676	
Ignacio Allende	Durango	676	
Ignacio Ramírez	Durango	676	
José Guadalupe Rodríguez (Peñuelas)	Durango	676	
Luis Moya (San Isidro)	Durango	676	
Pánuco de Coronado	Durango	676	
Peñon Blanco	Durango	676	
Ramón Corona	Durango	676	
Abasolo	Durango	677	
Canatlán	Durango	677	
Coneto de Comonfort	Durango	677	
Diez de Octubre (San Lucas de Ocampo)	Durango	677	
Donato Guerra, Durango	Durango	677	
Francisco I. Madero	Durango	677	
Francisco Rueda Serrano	Durango	677	
General Ignacio Zaragoza	Durango	677	
Guatimape	Durango	677	
José Guadalupe Aguilera (Santa Lucia)	Durango	677	
La Soledad	Durango	677	
Miguel Negrete (El Toboso)	Durango	677	
Nicolás Bravo	Durango	677	
Nuevo Ideal	Durango	677	
Ricardo Flores Magón	Durango	677	
Rodeo	Durango	677	
San Juan del Río del Centauro del Norte	Durango	677	
Santa Barba	Durango	677	
Venustiano Carranza (Ocotan)	Durango	677	
Chihuahua	Baja California	686	
Colonia La Puerta	Baja California	686	
Delta (Estación Delta)	Baja California	686	
Durango	Baja California	686	
Ejido Guanajuato	Baja California	686	
Ejido Sanson Flores	Baja California	686	
Ejido Sinaloa	Baja California	686	
Islas Agrarias Grupo B	Baja California	686	
Jalapa	Baja California	686	
Mexicali	Baja California	686	
Michoacán de Ocampo	Baja California	686	
Nayarit Llamada	Baja California	686	
Nuevo León	Baja California	686	
Puebla	Baja California	686	
Rumorosa	Baja California	686	
San Felipe	Baja California	686	
Adolfo Ruiz Cortines	Sinaloa	687	
Alfonso G. Calderón Velarde	Sinaloa	687	
Bachoco	Sinaloa	687	
Batamote	Sinaloa	687	
Corerepe (El Gallo)	Sinaloa	687	
Cubilete	Sinaloa	687	
Cubiri de Portelas	Sinaloa	687	
El Burrión	Sinaloa	687	
El Cerro Cabezón	Sinaloa	687	
El Huitussi	Sinaloa	687	
El Pitahayal	Sinaloa	687	
Estación Bamoa (Campo Wilson)	Sinaloa	687	
Estación Capomas	Sinaloa	687	
Estación Naranjo	Sinaloa	687	
Gabriel Leyva Solano (Benito Juárez)	Sinaloa	687	
Genaro Estrada	Sinaloa	687	
Guasave	Sinaloa	687	
Juan José Ríos	Sinaloa	687	
La Brecha	Sinaloa	687	
La Trinidad	Sinaloa	687	
Las Brisas (Emiliano Zapata)	Sinaloa	687	
Las Glorias	Sinaloa	687	
León Fonseca Estación (Verdura)	Sinaloa	687	
Maripa	Sinaloa	687	
Marmol de Salcido (Marmol)	Sinaloa	687	
Mezquite Alto	Sinaloa	687	
Nio	Sinaloa	687	
Palos Blancos	Sinaloa	687	
Portugués de Galvez	Sinaloa	687	
Sinaloa de Leyva	Sinaloa	687	
Tamazula	Sinaloa	687	
Agua Caliente de Garate	Sinaloa	694	
Agua Verde	Sinaloa	694	
Cacalotán	Sinaloa	694	
Chametla	Sinaloa	694	
Concordia	Sinaloa	694	
El Huajote	Sinaloa	694	
El Pozole	Sinaloa	694	
El Verde	Sinaloa	694	
Los Pozos	Sinaloa	694	
Potrerillos	Sinaloa	694	
Rosario	Sinaloa	694	
Cristo Rey	Sinaloa	695	
Escuinapa	Sinaloa	695	
Isla del Bosque	Sinaloa	695	
La Concha	Sinaloa	695	
Ojo de Agua de Palmillas	Sinaloa	695	
Teacapan	Sinaloa	695	
Cosala	Sinaloa	696	
Coyotitán	Sinaloa	696	
Estación Dimas	Sinaloa	696	
El Bolillo	Sinaloa	696	
El Espinal	Sinaloa	696	
La Cruz	Sinaloa	696	
Piaxtla de Arriba	Sinaloa	696	
Potrerillo del Norote	Sinaloa	696	
San Ignacio	Sinaloa	696	
Angostura	Sinaloa	697	
Badiraguato	Sinaloa	697	
Caimanero	Sinaloa	697	
Colonia Agricola Independencia	Sinaloa	697	
Colonia Agrícola México (Plamitas)	Sinaloa	697	
Costa Azul	Sinaloa	697	
El Progreso (El Jalón)	Sinaloa	697	
Juan Aldama (El Tigre)	Sinaloa	697	
La Reforma	Sinaloa	697	
Pericos	Sinaloa	697	
Sánchez Celis (El Gato de Lara)	Sinaloa	697	
Villa Gustavo Díaz Ordaz (Campo Plata)	Sinaloa	697	
Adolfo López Mateos (El Jahuara)	Sinaloa	698	
Camajoa	Sinaloa	698	
Charay	Sinaloa	698	
Choix	Sinaloa	698	
El Fuerte	Sinaloa	698	
Mochicahui Pueblo	Sinaloa	698	
San Blas	Sinaloa	698	
