= Mexican Federal Highway 10 =

Highway in Mexico

Federal Highway 10
- Carretera federal 10

Route information
- Maintained by Secretariat of Communications and Transportation

Major junctions
- North end: Fed. 2 near Janos, Chihuahua
- South end: Fed. 45 near El Sueco, Chihuahua

Location
- Country: Mexico
- State: Chihuahua

Highway system
- Mexican Federal Highways; List; Autopistas
← Fed. 9	→ Fed. 11

Federal Highway 10 (Spanish: Carretera Federal 10, Fed. 10 ) is a free part of the federal highways corridors (Spanish: los corredores carreteros federales) of Mexico.

It passes through the northern part of Chihuahua.

Fed. 10's northern terminus is in Janos, Chihuahua where it joins Fed. 2. It continues south to the city of Nuevo Casas Grandes, the main city in the region. Afterwards, it continues until Buenaventura where it changes its direction from north-west to south-east and east, passing through the town of Ricardo Flores Magon and joining Fed. 45 at El Sueco, Chihuahua.

== Major intersections ==
The entire route is in Chihuahua.

Municipality	Location	km	mi	Destinations	Notes
Ahumada	El Sueco			Fed. 45 – Ciudad Juárez, Chihuahua	Southern terminus; northbound exit and southbound entrance from Fed. 45
Buenaventura	Flores Magón			SH 7 / SH 19 – Chihuahua, Villa Ahumada, Ciudad Juárez	
Buenaventura	Flores Magón			SH 195	
Buenaventura				SH 56D – Nuevo Casas Grandes, Galeana	
Buenaventura				SH 27 – San Lorenzo	
Buenaventura				SH 15 – Ciudad Cuauhtémoc, Soto Maynes, Namiquipa	
Buenaventura	San Buenaventura			SH 5 – Ciudad Cuauhtémoc	
Galeana				SH 56D – Flores Magón	Interchange
Nuevo Casas Grandes	Nuevo Casas Grandes			SH 4 – Casas Grandes, Colonia Juárez	
Nuevo Casas Grandes	Nuevo Casas Grandes			SH 1	
Casas Grandes				SH 133	
Janos	Janos			Fed. 2 – Ciudad Juárez, Ascensión, Agua Prieta, Mexicali	Northern terminus
1.000 mi = 1.609 km; 1.000 km = 0.621 mi: Incomplete access
