= Xalapa (disambiguation) =

Xalapa is the capital of the Mexican state of Veracruz.

Xalapa or Jalapa may also refer to:

== Language ==
- Jalapa Mazatec, Mazatecan language of the Mexican state of Oaxaca

== Places ==
=== Guatemala ===
- Jalapa Department
- Jalapa, Jalapa

=== Mexico ===
Cities, villages, towns, and municipalities in the state of Oaxaca:
- Santa María Jalapa del Marqués (city and municipality)
- San Felipe Jalapa de Díaz (town)
- Jalapa del Valle (village)
Ejidos, cities, villiages, towns, and municipalities in other Mexican states:
- Jalapa, Baja California (ejido)
- Jalapa, Guerrero (town)
- Jalapa Municipality, Tabasco
  - Jalapa, Tabasco (city)

Alternate spelling (homophone)

- Xalapa, Veracruz (city)

=== Nepal ===
- Jalapa, village and also Village Development Committee of Khotang District, Sagarmatha Zone
- Jalapadevi, business center in the Sanphebagar Municipality, Achham District, Seti Zone

=== Nicaragua ===
- Jalapa, Nueva Segovia

=== United States ===
- Jalapa, Dooly County, Georgia
- Jalapa, Kane Township, Greene County, Illinois (ghost town)
- Jalapa, Pleasant Township, Grant County, Indiana
- Jalapa, Nickerson Township, Dodge County, Nebraska
- Jalapa, Newberry County, South Carolina
- Jalapa, McMinn County, Tennessee (1855)
- Jalapa, Monroe County, Tennessee

Alternate spelling

- Xalapa Farm, American thoroughbred horse breeding stable, Paris, Kentucky

Variant spelling

- Jalappa, Tilden Township, Berks County, Pennsylvania

== Plants ==
- Mirabilis jalapa
- Ipomoea purga (aka jalap and Ipomoea jalapa)

Variant spelling

- Cancer jalap (Phytolacca americana)

== Pharmaceuticals ==
Variant spelling

- Jalap, obsolete cathartic drug

== Railway ==
- Jalapa Railroad & Power Co., former (1898–1945) electric railroad between Xalapa and Teocelo, in the Mexican state of Veracruz
