= Hacienda de Pancho Villa =

Museum

Coordinates: 26.38341°N 105.36856°W

Hacienda de Pancho Villa, formerly the Hacienda de la Limpia Concepción de Canutillo, in Canutillo, Durango, Mexico. It was the residence of Pancho Villa in his final years and is now a museum.

== See also ==
- Casa de Pancho Villa
