= Naco Municipality =

Naco
- Municipality
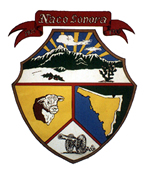
- Coat of arms

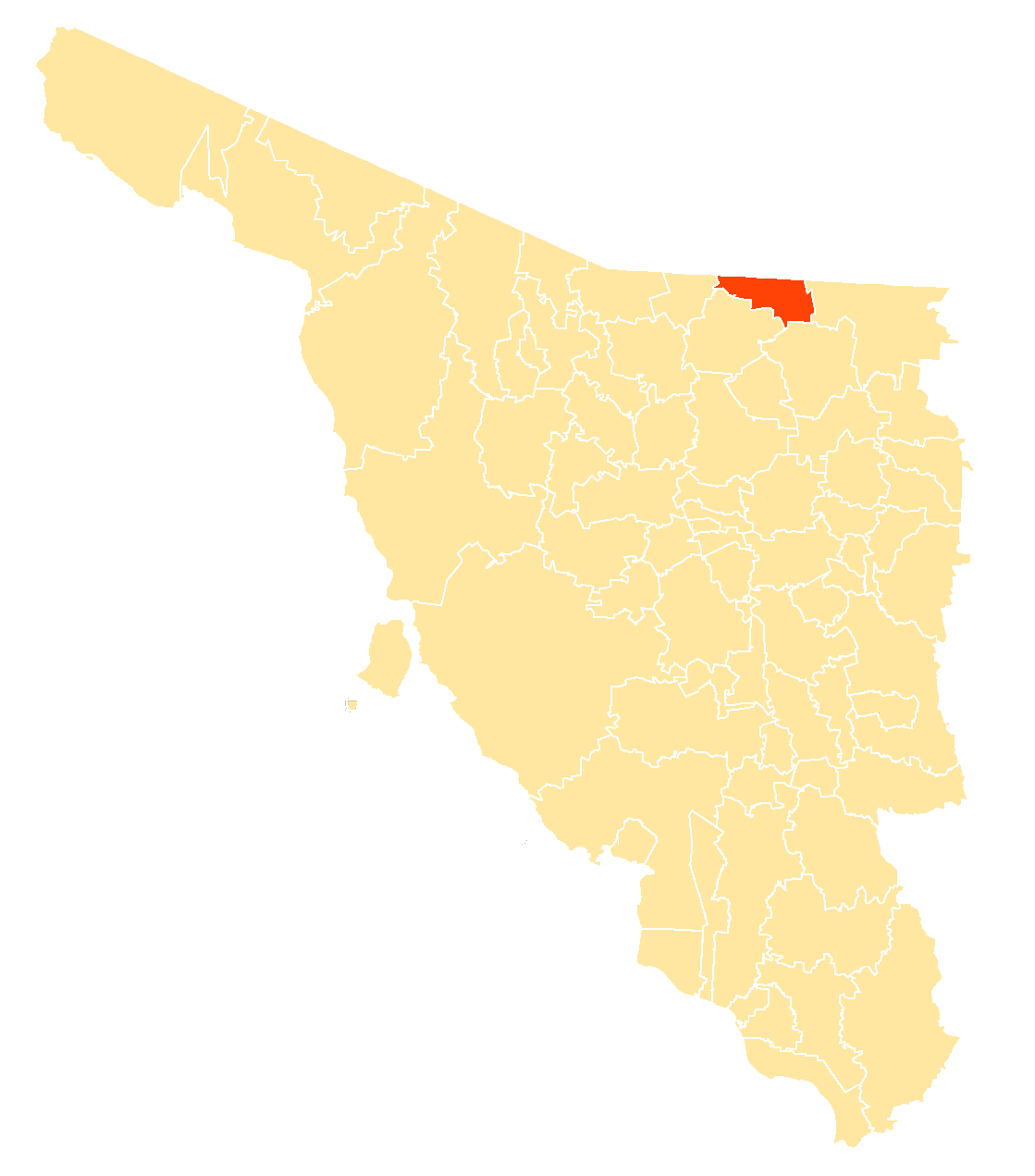
- Location of the municipality in Sonora
- Coordinates: 31°12′N 110°0′W
- Country: Mexico
- State: Sonora
- Seat: Naco, Sonora

Population (2020)
  - Total: 5,774
- Time zone: UTC–07:00 (Zona Pacífico)
- Area code: +52 633

Naco is a municipality in the state of Sonora in northwestern Mexico.

== The municipality ==
As municipal seat, the town of Naco is the governing authority for 128 other localities, most of which have only one or two residents and only two – Cuauhtémoc Ejido (189), and San Pedro (108) have more than eight residents according to the 2010 census. The total municipal population is 6,401 (as of 2010) of whom 6,064 or 94.7% live in the town proper. The municipality has a territory of 651.8 square kilometers and it borders the municipalities of Fronteras, Agua Prieta and Cananea. The United States border is on the north.

The area of 1,085 hectares in the municipality is dedicated to agriculture, growing mostly alfalfa, beans, corn and animal feed. Farming depends on irrigation from about 25 wells and two small dams. Most livestock here is cattle, which are raised on 162,000 hectares, and whose water needs are met by an additional 36 wells and natural springs. There are facilities that raise calves for export to the United States as well. Industry is based on four maquiladoras which employ about 700 workers and produce electronics, textiles and rugs, and workshops that produce wood, iron and metal furniture. There is also mining of lime and copper.

The most rugged part of the municipality is in the south, in which is the San José mountain range. Other areas are semi flat, with low mountains and mesas. At the western edge is Magallanes mountain range. The main river here is called the Punta de Agua, which begins in the United States and continues on into Agua Prieta. The area has a relatively dry climate with high temperatures averaging 39 °C in the summer and 9 °C in the winter. The rainy season is in the summer with an annual rainfall of about 466.0 millimeters. There are three types of vegetation here. Most of the municipality is arid grassland, with forests at the highest elevations. In some other areas, vegetation is mixed. Wildlife mostly consists of reptiles and amphibians such as the turtle, and the rattlesnake and small mammals such as the bat, the lynx and opossum. There are bird species and some deer as well.

Naco is located on the border with Arizona. There are plans to reactivate shipping through this port via the rail line between here and Benson, Arizona. This project only requires that eight km of rail line be rehabilitated. The goal is to open a new rail port of entry that will connect with Guaymas.

In the last election for municipal president, the two principal candidates were tied with 1,274 votes each, prompting an official recount by federal officials.

=== Adjacent municipalities and counties ===
- Agua Prieta – east
- Fronteras – southeast
- Cananea – southwest and west
- Cochise County, Arizona – north
