= Jalapa, Oaxaca =

Jalapa, Oaxaca may refer to:

- Santa María Jalapa del Marqués
- San Felipe Jalapa de Díaz
- Jalapa del Valle
