= Pesqueira =

Pesqueira may refer to:

- Pesqueira, Pernambuco, a municipality in Pernambuco, Brazilian
- Pesqueira, Sonora, a town in San Miguel de Horcasitas Municipality, Sonora, Mexico
- Villa Pesqueira, a municipality in Sonora, Mexico
- São João da Pesqueira, a municipality in Viseu district, Portugal

== People with the surname ==
- Ignacio Pesqueira (1820–1886), Mexican politician and general
- Roberto V. Pesqueira (1882–1966), Mexican politician
- Josué Pesqueira (born 1990), Portuguese footballer

== See also ==
- Pesquera (disambiguation)
- Pesquería
