= Silva, Colombia =

Silva
- Vereda
- Location in Valle del Cauca Department and Colombia Silva (Colombia)
- Coordinates: 3°28′47.6″N 77°12′29.9″W
- Country: Colombia
- Department: Valle del Cauca
- Municipality: Buenaventura municipality
- Elevation: 72 ft (22 m)

Population (2005)
  - Total: 197
- Time zone: UTC-5 (Colombia Standard Time)

Silva is a vereda in Buenaventura Municipality, Valle del Cauca Department in Colombia.

== Climate ==
Silva has a tropical rainforest climate (Af) with very heavy to extremely heavy rainfall year-round.

Climate data for Silva
| Month | Jan | Feb | Mar | Apr | May | Jun | Jul | Aug | Sep | Oct | Nov | Dec | Year |
|---|---|---|---|---|---|---|---|---|---|---|---|---|---|
| Mean daily maximum °C (°F) | 29.7 (85.5) | 30.2 (86.4) | 30.3 (86.5) | 30.2 (86.4) | 30.0 (86.0) | 29.9 (85.8) | 30.0 (86.0) | 29.8 (85.6) | 29.6 (85.3) | 29.0 (84.2) | 28.9 (84.0) | 29.3 (84.7) | 29.7 (85.5) |
| Daily mean °C (°F) | 26.1 (79.0) | 26.4 (79.5) | 26.4 (79.5) | 26.4 (79.5) | 26.3 (79.3) | 26.1 (79.0) | 26.1 (79.0) | 26.1 (79.0) | 26.0 (78.8) | 25.7 (78.3) | 25.6 (78.1) | 25.8 (78.4) | 26.1 (78.9) |
| Mean daily minimum °C (°F) | 22.5 (72.5) | 22.6 (72.7) | 22.6 (72.7) | 22.7 (72.9) | 22.7 (72.9) | 22.4 (72.3) | 22.3 (72.1) | 22.4 (72.3) | 22.4 (72.3) | 22.4 (72.3) | 22.4 (72.3) | 22.3 (72.1) | 22.5 (72.4) |
| Average rainfall mm (inches) | 404 (15.9) | 326 (12.8) | 359 (14.1) | 538 (21.2) | 722 (28.4) | 644 (25.4) | 628 (24.7) | 690 (27.2) | 834 (32.8) | 858 (33.8) | 795 (31.3) | 564 (22.2) | 7,362 (289.8) |
