= Pesquera =

Pesquera can refer to

== Places ==
- Pesquera, Cantabria, Spain
- La Pesquera, Cuenca, Spain
- Pesquera de Duero in the province of Valladolid, Spain
- Villa Pesquera, Puerto Rico

== People ==
=== Surname ===
- Carlos Pesquera (born 1956), Puerto Rican civil engineer
- Diego de Pesquera, 16th-century Spanish sculptor
- José Lorenzo Pesquera (1882–1950), Resident Commissioner of Puerto Rico
- Héctor Pesquera, Secretary of Public Safety of Puerto Rico
- Hernan Gregorio Pesquera (1924–1982), Puerto Rican judge

== See also ==
- Pesqueira (disambiguation)
- Pesquería
