= Flores Magón =

Flores Magón is a Mexican surname.

People with the surname Flores Magón include the trio of Mexican anarchist brothers:

- Ricardo Flores Magón (1874–1922)
- Jesús Flores Magón (1871–1930)
- Enrique Flores Magón (1877-1954)

There is also a town of Flores Magón, Chihuahua.
