= Mexican Federal Highway 9 =

Highway in Mexico

Federal Highway 9
- Carretera federal 9

Route information
- Maintained by Secretariat of Communications and Transportation
- Length: 38 km (24 mi)

Major junctions
- North end: Fed. 40 near Cadereyta de Jiménez, Nuevo León
- South end: Fed. 85 near Allende, Nuevo León

Location
- Country: Mexico
- State: Nuevo León
- Major cities: Ciudad de Allende, Atongo de Abajo, Palmitos, Puerto Rico, Cadereyta Jiménez

Highway system
- Mexican Federal Highways; List; Autopistas
← Fed. 8	→ Fed. 10

Federal Highway 9 (Spanish: Carretera Federal 9, Fed. 9) is a toll-free part of the federal highway corridors (Spanish: los corredores carreteros federales). It crosses the center of Nuevo León, from Allende, Nuevo León to Cadereyta, Nuevo León. It has a length of 38 km (24 mi).
