= Naco, Sonora =

Naco
- Town and Municipality
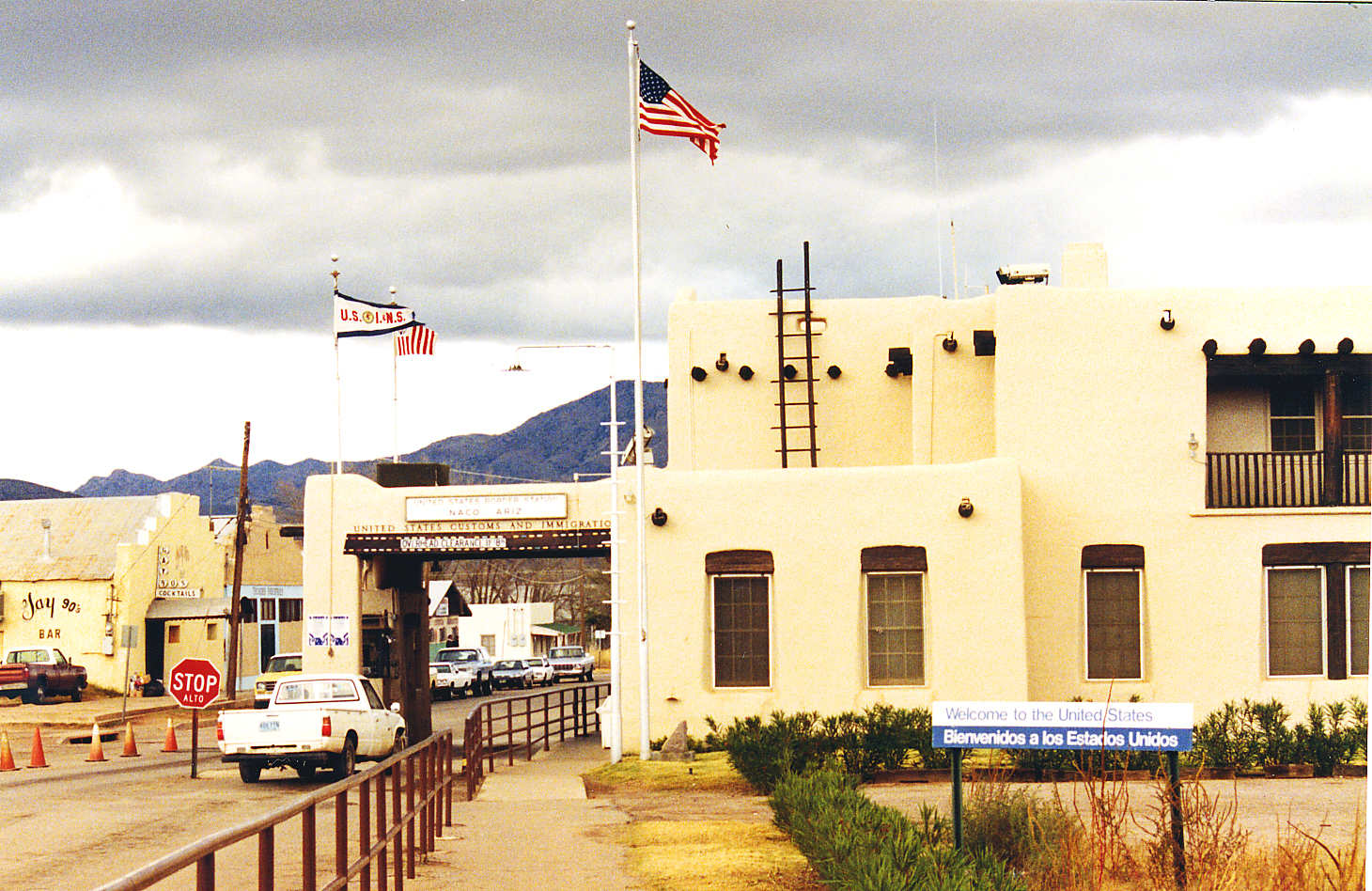
- Border crossing at Naco

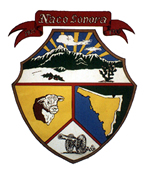
- Coat of arms

- Location in Mexico
- Coordinates: 31°19′37″N 109°56′52″W
- Country: Mexico
- State: Sonora
- Municipality: Naco
- Founded: 1901
- Municipal Status: 1937

Area
  - Total: 651.8 km^{2} (251.7 sq mi)
- Elevation (of seat): 1,408 m (4,619 ft)

Population (2020) Municipality
  - Total: 5,774
- Time zone: UTC–07:00 (Zona Pacífico)
- Area code: +52 633
- Website: (in Spanish) /Official site

Naco is a Mexican town in Naco Municipality located in the northeast part of Sonora state on the border with the United States. It is directly across from the unincorporated town of Naco, Arizona. The name Naco comes from the Opata language and means prickly pear cactus. The town saw fighting during the Mexican Revolution and during a rebellion led by General José Gonzalo Escobar in 1929. During the second conflict, an American pilot by the name of Patrick Murphy volunteered to bomb federal forces for the rebels, but mistakenly bombed Naco, Arizona, instead. Today, the town has been strongly affected by the smuggling of drugs, people and weapons across the international border.

== History ==
Before the arrival of Europeans, the area was dominated by the Opata peoples. Naco, Sonora, along with Naco, Arizona, came into being in 1897 as a border crossing to connect copper mines on both sides. Naco, Sonora, was officially founded in 1900 with the construction of the Naco-Cananea rail line. Until 1901, the area was part of the municipality of Fronteras, then part of the municipality of Cananea. It became an independent municipality in 1937.

There was a major miners’ strike in Cananea in 1906, which is seen as a precursor to the Mexican Revolution in 1910. The instability from this strike resulted in troops on both sides of the border facing each other. During the Mexican Revolution, the town would change hands various times. At stake was the revenue from the custom's house and when Arizona voted itself dry in 1915, revenue from the saloons that cropped up. One of the major battles occurred in 1913. General Ojeda, who was in command of Mexican federal troops in Sonora, moved this force of Yaquis and regular army soldiers from Agua Prieta to Naco as rebel forces closed in on 12 March. Ojeda fought against the rebels from his Naco base for a number of days before the Yaquis decided to cross the border into the U.S. and surrender. Ojeda continued to fight with the men he had left but eventually the rebels overran Naco on 13 April, with Ojeda and the rest of his men also crossing the border to escape.

A more important confrontation took place here called the Siege of Naco. The siege was the longest sustained battle of the Mexican Revolution lasting 119 days from 1914 to 1915. The conflict directly or indirectly involved or affected all of the major players of the Revolution and affected the outcome of the conflict. The battle was fought between forces loyal to Francisco Villa (called Villistas) and forces loyal to the Constitutionalist faction of Venustiano Carranza and Alvaro Obregón. The battle was prompted by Governor José María Maytorena's decision to challenge Constitutionalist forces under command of Plutarco Elías Calles in Sonora for control of this state in the fall of 1914. Maytorena's forces attacked Calles’ forces in Nogales and forced them to retreat to Naco. Here the Constitutionalists dug in and Maytorena began a siege, trying to overrun Naco's defenses for nearly four months. The protracted conflict claimed heavy losses on both sides and property damage to Naco, Arizona, prompting fears of US citizens violating federal neutrality laws. Extra troops were sent to nearby Fort Huachuca to protect U.S. interests, with cavalry regiments placed along the border to make sure the fighting did not spill across it. This resulted in several cavalry soldiers being wounded by stray bullets. U.S. Army Chief of Staff Hugh L. Scott was sent to broker a truce, and succeeded with the signing of the Treaty of Naco on 15 January 1915.

During the 1920s, with the Arizona side remaining dry due to Prohibition, Naco made money off of saloons and gambling, giving it a seedy reputation.

In early 1929, José Gonzalo Escobar led a rebellion against the government of Emilio Portes Gil. Mexican federal troops dug in around Naco and were almost under constant attack by the rebels. The battles became something of a spectator sport on the Arizona side of the border with people coming from as far as Bisbee to watch. While the occasional stray bullet would send these spectators towards cover, both sides in the conflict were careful as they did not want U.S. Armed Forces coming across the border to retaliate.

Patrick Murphy was an aviator who owned a bi-winged airplane and performed tricks with it. He decided to assist the rebels by offering to build homemade bombs and drop them on federal positions. The rebels accepted his offer and promised a reward. Murphy constructed the bombs by filling pipes with dynamite, scrap iron, nails, and bolts, then placing the pipes in old leather suitcases. On 31 March and 1 April, Murphy made two attempts to drop the bombs, but they failed to explode. A third bomb hit the customs house, spraying spectators on the Arizona side of the border. Between 4 and 6 April, Murphy made four more bombs and dropped them. The first hit a trench, killing two federal soldiers, but the other three landed on the Arizona side of the border, hitting various buildings in Naco, Arizona. The next day, U.S. government troops arrived and disabled Murphy's plane. Murphy escaped to Mexican rebel lines and crossed back to the U.S. when the rebellion ended, and was briefly jailed for his violation of neutrality laws. Murphy was the first person working for a foreign entity to bomb U.S. soil.

At 2:30 A.M., October 21, 1974, President Luis Echeverría took a moonlight walking tour of Naco, which concluded with his promise of industry, money, construction, and welfare for the impoverished town.

== Climate ==
Naco has a semi-arid climate (Köppen climate classification BSk) moderated by its altitude. Winters are cool and sunny with mild temperatures during the day, averaging 16 °C (60.8 °F) and cold temperatures during the night, averaging 1 °C (33.8 °F). Frosts are common in winter and the municipality receives 2 days with snow per year. Summers are hot with a July high of 33.5 °C (92.3 °F) and a low of 18.9 °C (66.0 °F) but temperatures can exceed 40 °C (104.0 °F) on some days. Precipitation is low, averaging 350.7 millimetres (14 in) but it is more common during the summer months during the monsoon when humid air from the Gulf of California comes in. The record high was 45.0 °C (113.0 °F) on June 15, 1990, and the record low was −18.0 °C (−0.4 °F) on December 8, 1978.

Climate data for Naco, Sonora
Month	Jan	Feb	Mar	Apr	May	Jun	Jul	Aug	Sep	Oct	Nov	Dec	Year
Record high °C (°F)	36.0 (96.8)	33.0 (91.4)	34.0 (93.2)	38.0 (100.4)	41.0 (105.8)	45.0 (113.0)	42.0 (107.6)	42.0 (107.6)	44.0 (111.2)	36.0 (96.8)	39.0 (102.2)	38.0 (100.4)	45.0 (113.0)
Mean daily maximum °C (°F)	16.1 (61.0)	17.7 (63.9)	20.6 (69.1)	24.5 (76.1)	29.1 (84.4)	33.9 (93.0)	33.5 (92.3)	32.2 (90.0)	31.0 (87.8)	26.3 (79.3)	20.9 (69.6)	16.9 (62.4)	25.2 (77.4)
Daily mean °C (°F)	8.6 (47.5)	10.0 (50.0)	12.6 (54.7)	16.0 (60.8)	20.6 (69.1)	25.3 (77.5)	26.2 (79.2)	25.2 (77.4)	23.4 (74.1)	18.3 (64.9)	12.7 (54.9)	9.1 (48.4)	17.3 (63.1)
Mean daily minimum °C (°F)	1.2 (34.2)	2.2 (36.0)	4.6 (40.3)	7.6 (45.7)	12.0 (53.6)	16.7 (62.1)	18.9 (66.0)	18.2 (64.8)	15.8 (60.4)	10.4 (50.7)	4.6 (40.3)	1.4 (34.5)	9.5 (49.1)
Record low °C (°F)	−11.0 (12.2)	−10.0 (14.0)	−8.0 (17.6)	−4.0 (24.8)	−1.0 (30.2)	8.0 (46.4)	7.0 (44.6)	10.0 (50.0)	3.0 (37.4)	−4.0 (24.8)	−7.0 (19.4)	−18.0 (−0.4)	−18.0 (−0.4)
Average precipitation mm (inches)	21.5 (0.85)	15.8 (0.62)	14.0 (0.55)	7.9 (0.31)	5.1 (0.20)	14.1 (0.56)	86.6 (3.41)	83.0 (3.27)	35.5 (1.40)	27.4 (1.08)	14.4 (0.57)	25.4 (1.00)	350.7 (13.81)
Average precipitation days (≥ 0.1 mm)	2.9	2.4	1.9	1.0	1.2	1.7	9.4	8.5	4.0	2.8	2.1	3.1	41.0
Average snowy days	0.36	0.18	0.40	0.10	0	0	0	0	0	0	0.11	0.80	1.95
Source 1: Servicio Meteorológico National
Source 2: Colegio de Postgraduados (snowy days)

== The town ==
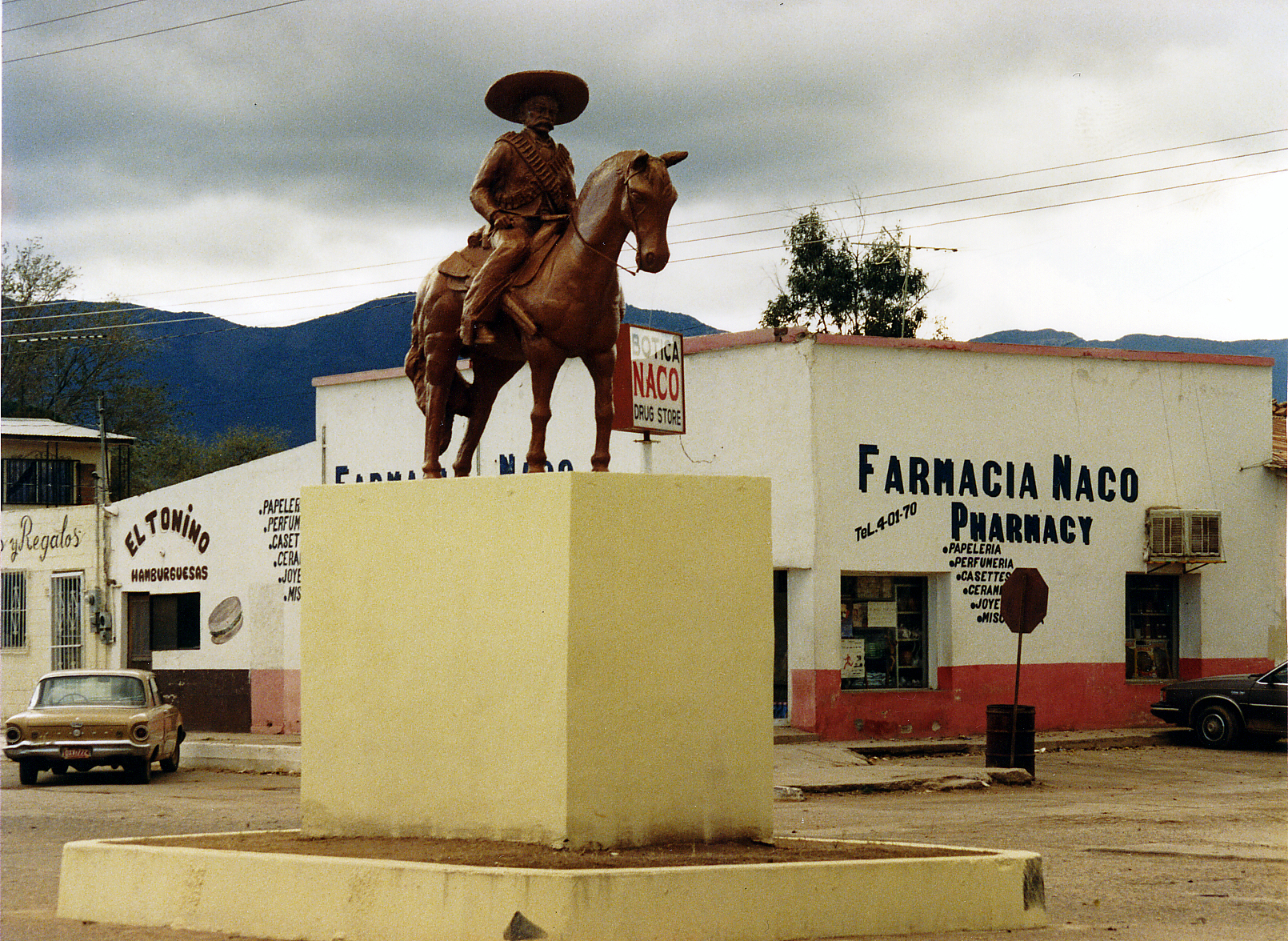
An intersection near the border crossing, 1990

Today, the town layout is based on two principal north–south avenues and 12 smaller east–west streets. Only the two avenues are fully paved. In the capital of Hermosillo, Naco is called “un pueblo chico, olvidado de Dios” (A small village forgotten by God). Due to the fighting in the first half of the 20th century, almost every old house in Naco has holes from gun battles. The Naco Hotel, with its meter-thick mud walls, used to advertise its bulletproof rooms.

The border crossing at Naco closes at 10:00 pm and permits for foreign cars are no longer available. Naco's downtown is small but it is popular with southern Arizona residents who come here to buy prescription medications, food, alcoholic beverages and crafts such as pottery, sombreros, piñatas, glassware, leather, clothing and other items. Many products are sold in open-air markets, which have a reputation for counterfeit products. There are also about eighty established business that cater to both locals and Arizona residents. Due to the difference in drinking age (18 in Mexico, 21 in the United States) the Galaxy disco is popular on weekends.

Part of the economy here is catering to the migrants heading north with guesthouses, hotels, restaurants and stores selling jackets and blankets.

Rodolfo Santos is the publisher and editor of the Naco newspaper El Mirador. This newspaper has exposed corruption and abuse at the local orphanage, leading to charges against the director. Prior to that, the newspaper uncovered corruption of the former municipal president, Vicente Torres, forcing state officials to investigate and remove the president from office. However, Santos will not take on organized crime, because doing so would put the newspaper's families in danger. The newspaper is located at the Santos family home, which also has a shop selling school uniforms. It has been around only since 2006 and is Naco's first permanent newspaper. While its investigative reporting has earned it a reputation, it remains a community newspaper, publishing local items of interest such as quinceañeras, school news, cultural events and more. However, life for journalists can be hazardous, especially those who report on organized crime. The newspaper is printed in Bisbee, Arizona and distributed free there, Naco, Cananea, Agua Prieta and Rio Sonora.

== The smuggling problem ==
The Naco area has previously had major problems with the smuggling of drugs and people north and weapons south. Although it is not one of the main routes into the United States. Shootings related to drug trafficking have occurred here such as the street murders of two near the Hotel Cowboy in 2009. Federal troops have been stationed here due to the violence, which has the population divided. While the security they can provide is welcome, there is concern about the violation of human rights.

More visible are the migrants looking to cross the border illegally into the United States. Because the California border is all but sealed since the Border Patrol's Operation Guardian, many migrants have come to the Arizona border between Agua Prieta and Nogales, with Naco in between. This changed Naco starting from the 1990s as it became one of the preferred routes for “coyotes” (also called polleros or enganchadores) or smugglers who offer to take migrants across. It is absolutely not a preferred route for human traffickers as of 2024 due to extreme border security measures on the U.S. side. Providing lodging for migrants is a growing business in Naco, where the rate is between 200 and 300 pesos per night per person. Many of these lodgings are filled with people who cannot cross the border. One example is the Hospedaje Santa María, which is a run-down, two-story building.

Until 2008 About 400 people a day were deported back to Mexico between Naco and Agua Prieta and 45% of the deaths of migrants occurred on the Arizona border. Especially on weekends, one can see Mexicans who have been deported here from Arizona on the main road, Francisco I. Madero, heading to the bus station. Some of those who fail to cross or are deported to here stay, working to earn money for another attempt or to go home or live permanently. An organization from Naco, Arizona, called Naco Wellness, has been working to help deported immigrants with health issues, both on the U.S. side of the border and on the Mexican side, working with Mexican authorities. As for weapons, an arrest was of an American woman who was caught in November 2009 smuggling forty one AK-47s in her vehicle.

As of 2024, a border wall has been built between Naco, Sonora and Naco, Arizona. There is a Border Patrol Station between the two towns, and there is constant monitoring of the international border by Border Patrol agents and drones. The border wall has been painted with murals by children in Naco, working with Studio Marioposa. Many American citizens regularly cross the border to Naco, Sonora to purchase prescription medications at a lower cost than they can afford in the United States as well as receive dental care which is more affordable.

== The wall ==
Since the 1990s, walls have been built along sections of the U.S.-Mexico border, including the area between the two Nacos to slow illegal immigration. The wall here is four meters high and made of steel. It currently extends 7.4 km, but there are plans to extend it another 40 km. Security here was further tightened after 11 September 2001, which led to the closing of many businesses on the Arizona side of the wall. Illegal border crossing surged here after the passage of NAFTA and the successful sealing of the California-Mexico border. The Border Patrol credits the wall and better surveillance technology with cutting the number of captured border crossers near Naco by half in 2006. People on both sides of the wall have mixed feelings about it. Newspaper editor Rodolfo Santos says that if people get close to the wall, the Border Patrol calls the Mexican police. However, the wall is not stopping people from coming here to try to cross. Santos figures about half the town makes a living either by housing migrants or as “coyote” guides.
