= Borders of Mexico =

Political boundaries between the United States and neighboring territories

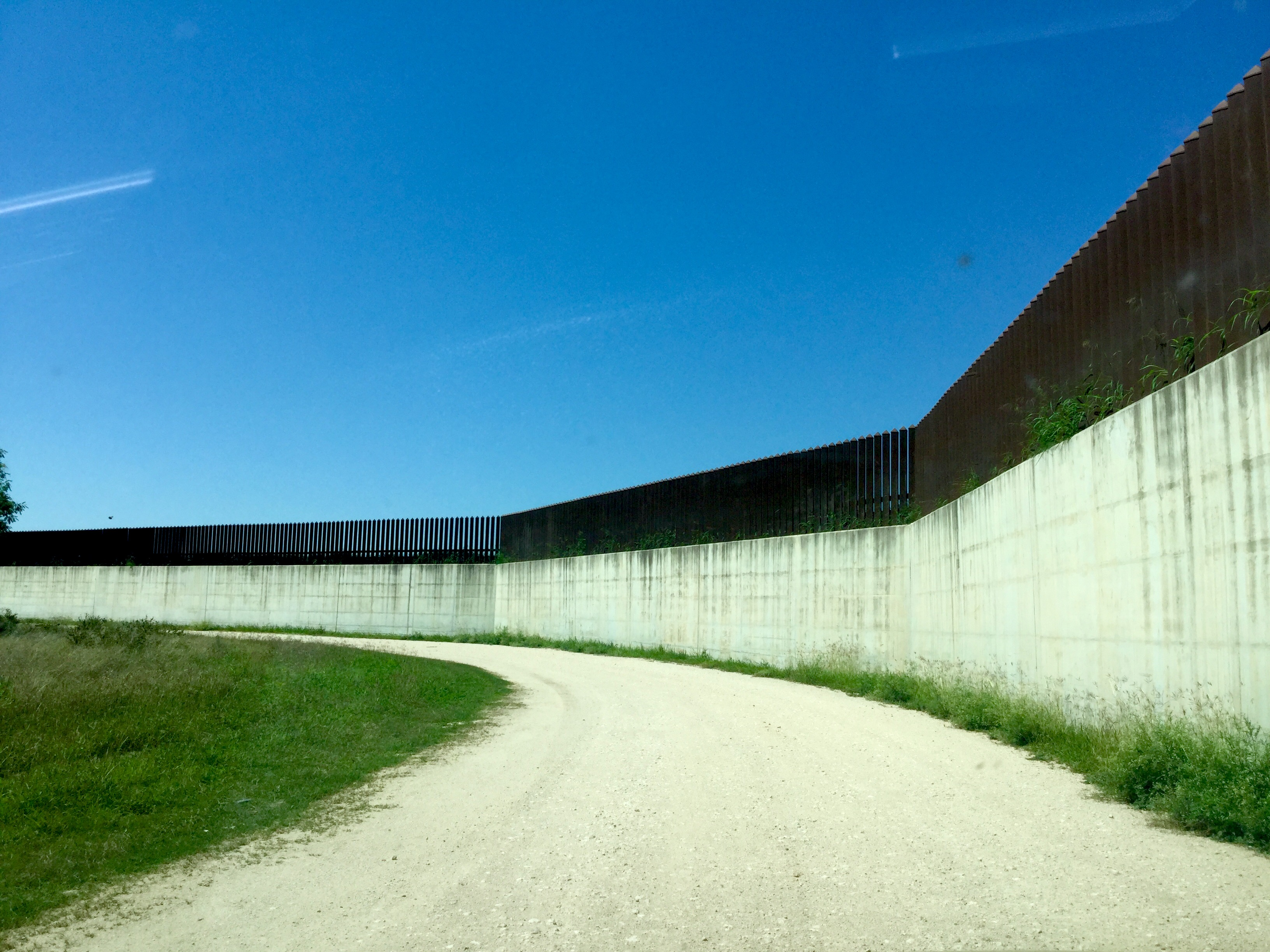
Mexican border with the United States.

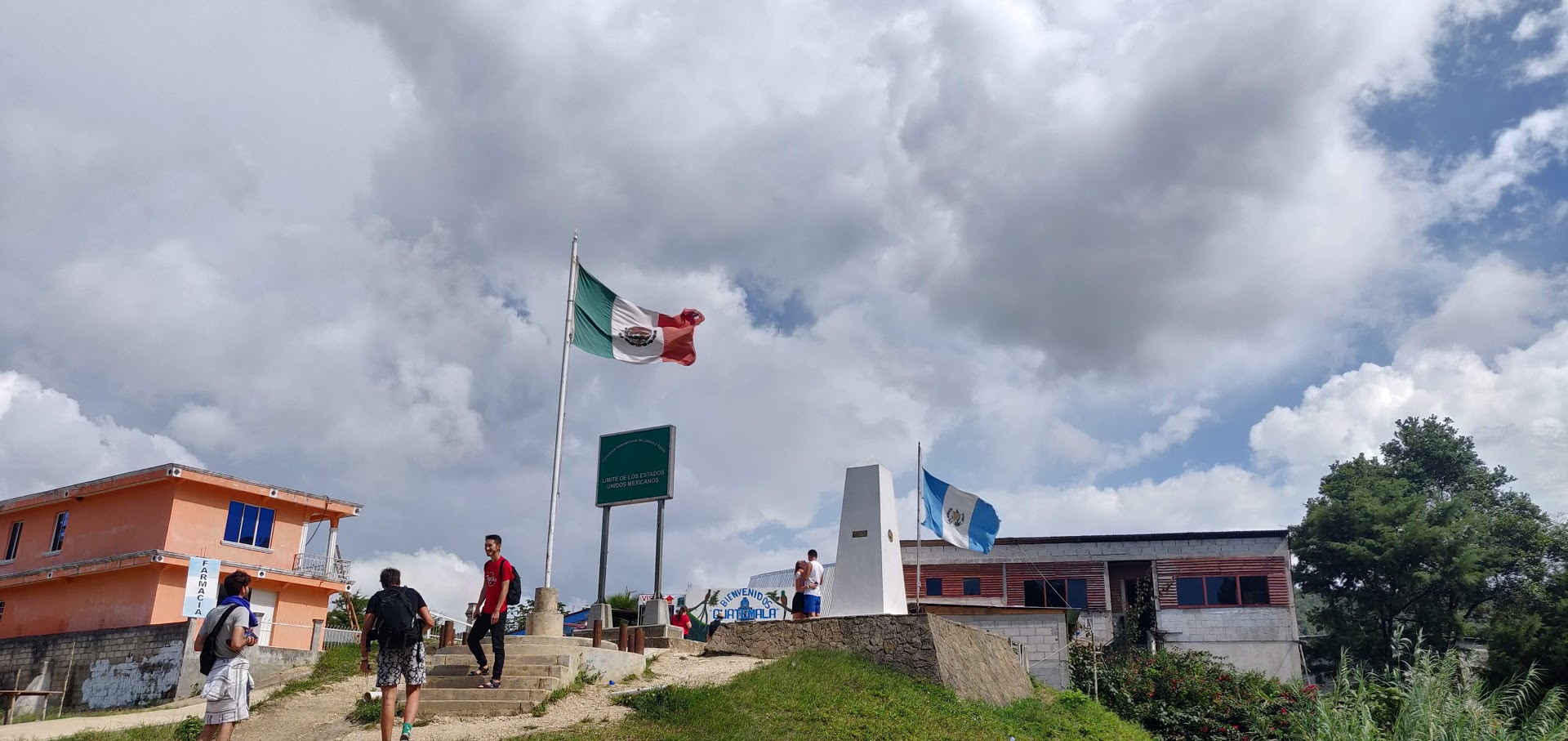
Border between Mexico and Guatemala

Mexico shares international borders with three nations:

- To the north the United States–Mexico border, which extends for a length of 3,141 kilometres (1,952 mi) through the states of Baja California, Sonora, Chihuahua, Coahuila, Nuevo León and Tamaulipas.
- To the southeast, the Belize–Mexico border, 251 kilometres (156 mi) long, limiting the state of Quintana Roo, almost exclusively following the course of the Río Hondo.
- Also to the southeast, the Guatemala–Mexico border, measuring 871 kilometres (541 mi) and touches the states of Campeche, Tabasco and Chiapas, and includes stretches of the Río Usumacinta, Río Salinas and Río Suchiate.

== Maritime borders ==
Five nations and Mexico share a marine border:

- in the Pacific Ocean with Guatemala and the United States;
- beside the United States in the Atlantic Ocean; and alongside Belize, Cuba, and Honduras, in the Caribbean Sea.

Based on six locations and spanning 263 kilometers(163 miles), the 2005 pact establishes the maritime border between Mexico and Honduras. In 1976 accord established Mexico's and Cuba's maritime boundary.

The United States and other nations have three accords dating back to 1970, 1978, and 2000 that have established a shared maritime boundary of 785 km(486 mi). (565 km in the Pacific Ocean and 621 km in the Gulf of Mexico).

== See also ==
- Garita (checkpoint), in Mexico
