= Rodeo Municipality =

Municipality in the Mexican state of Durango

Rodeo
- Municipality
- Municipality of Rodeo in Durango

- Location in Mexico
- Coordinates: 25°11′N 104°34′W
- Country: Mexico
- State: Durango
- Municipal seat: Rodeo

Area
  - Total: 1,854.9 km^{2} (716.2 sq mi)

Population (2010)
  - Total: 12,788
  - Density: 6.8942/km^{2} (17.856/sq mi)

Rodeo is a municipality in the Mexican state of Durango. The municipal seat lies at Rodeo. The municipality covers an area of 1,854.9 km^{2}.

As of 2010, the municipality had a total population of 12,788, up from 11,231 as of 2005.

As of 2010, the town of Rodeo had a population of 4,666. Other than the town of Rodeo, the municipality had 71 localities, the largest of which (with 2010 population in parentheses) was: Abasolo (1,208), classified as rural.
