= Dr. Belisario Domínguez Municipality =

Municipality in the Mexican state of Chihuahua

Dr. Belisario Domínguez
- Municipality
- Municipality of Dr. Belisario Domínguez in Chihuahua

- Location in Mexico
- Coordinates: 28°9′18″N 106°28′37″W
- Country: Mexico
- State: Chihuahua
- Municipal seat: San Lorenzo

Area
  - Total: 636.3 km^{2} (245.7 sq mi)

Population (2010)
  - Total: 2,911

Dr. Belisario Domínguez is one of the 67 municipalities of Chihuahua, in northern Mexico. The municipal seat lies at San Lorenzo. The municipality covers an area of 7,877 km^{2}.

As of 2010, the municipality had a total population of 2,911, up from 1,453 as of 2005.

The municipality had 41 localities, none of which had a population over 1,000.

It acquired its present name in 1935 in honor of Belisario Domínguez, a senator for Chiapas murdered during the Mexican Revolution.

== Geography ==
=== Towns and villages ===
The municipality has 23 localities.

Name	Population (2005)
Tutuaca	752
Santa María de Cuevas	324
Santa Rosalía de Cuevas	308
San Lorenzo	308
Total Municipality	7471
