= San Antonio del Mar =

San Antonio del Mar, Baja California
- Locality
- Saint Anthony of the Sea
- Nicknames: San Antonio del Mar, San Antonio del Padua, San Antonio Shores
- Location of San Antonio del Mar in Baja California

- Location of San Antonio del Mar in Mexico
- Coordinates: 32°20′32″N 117°3′22″W
- Country: Mexico
- State: Baja California
- Municipality: Playas de Tijuana
- Locality established: 1966

Area
  - Total: 1.265 km^{2} (0.488 sq mi)
- Elevation: 50 m (160 ft)

Population (2010 census)
  - Total: 590
  - Density: 470/km^{2} (1,200/sq mi)
- Time zone: UTC– 08:00 (PST)
  - Summer (DST): UTC– 07:00 (PDT)
- Area code: 661
- Website: http://www.rosarito.gob.mx
- Sources: (in Spanish) INEGI, Enciclopedia de los Municipios de México

San Antonio del Mar is a Locality located in the Municipality of Tijuana, with 590 inhabitants.

== History ==
San Antonio del Mar was founded in 1966 by a group of American investors, who wanted a beach resort for Tourists and Expatriates.

The community was originally named San Antonio de Padua, named after the original Saint of The Alamo mission, which was close to where San Antonio was established, but they later changed it in 1973 to San Antonio del Mar to reflect the proximity to the ocean.
