= Jalapa Municipality =

Municipality in the Mexican state of Tabasco

Coordinates: 17°43′N 92°48′W

Jalapa
- Municipality
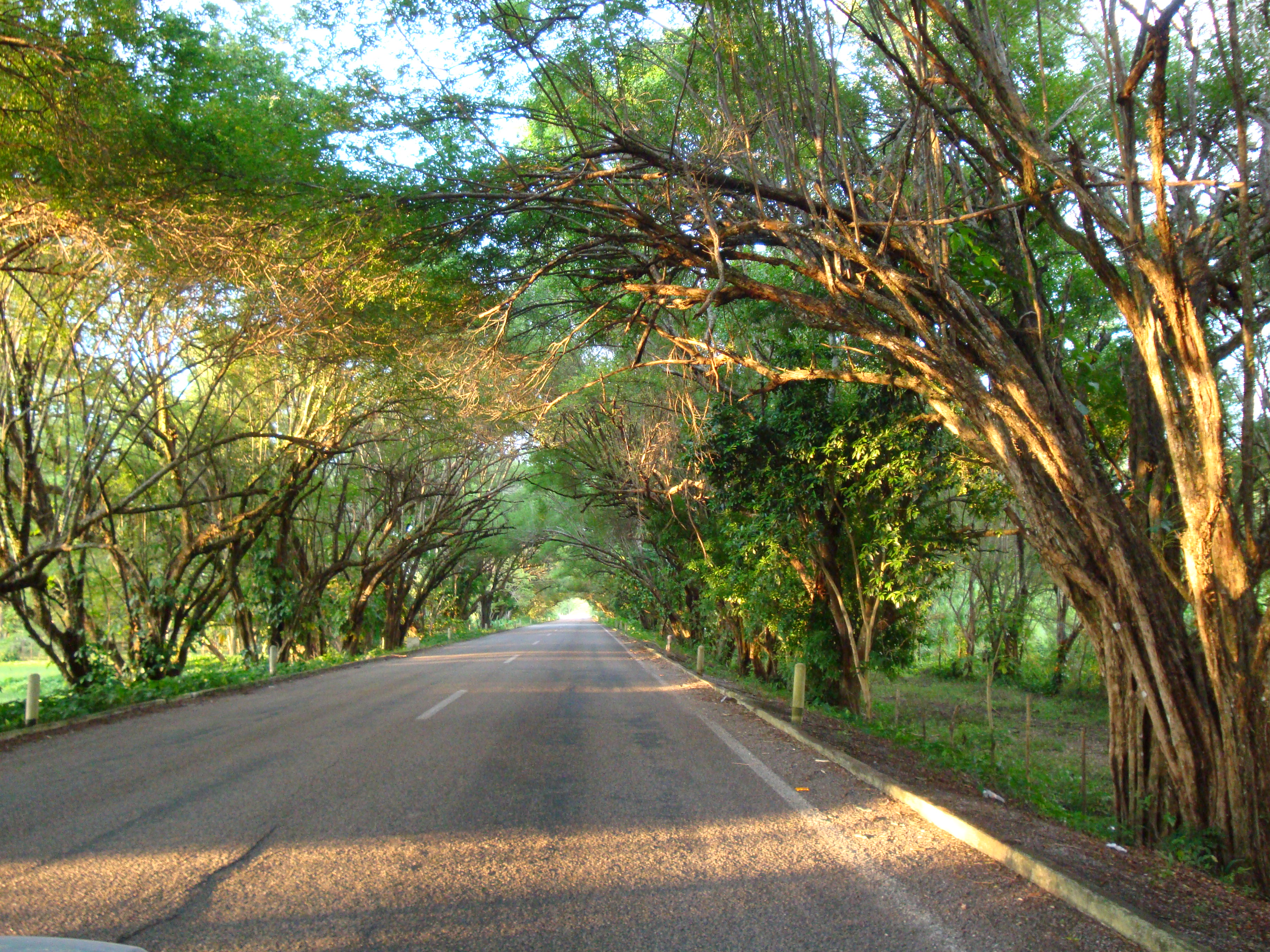
- Section of the Jalapa-Villahermosa highway

- Location of the municipality within Tabasco
- Country: Mexico
- State: Tabasco
- Seat: Jalapa, Tabasco

Government
  - Federal electoral district: Tabasco's 6th
- Time zone: UTC-6 (Zona Centro)

Jalapa is a municipality in the Mexican state of Tabasco.

The municipal seat is the city of Jalapa, Tabasco.
