= Rodeo, Durango =

City in the Mexican state of Durango

Rodeo
- Municipal seat and city
- Location in Mexico
- Coordinates: 25°11′N 104°4′W
- Country: Mexico
- State: Durango
- Municipality: Rodeo

Population (2010)
  - Total: 4,666

Rodeo is a city and seat of the municipality of Rodeo, in the state of Durango, north-western Mexico. As of 2010, the town of Rodeo had a population of 4,666.

== Climate ==
Climate data for Rodeo (1991–2020)
Month	Jan	Feb	Mar	Apr	May	Jun	Jul	Aug	Sep	Oct	Nov	Dec	Year
Record high °C (°F)	39.7 (103.5)	41.0 (105.8)	39.0 (102.2)	42.7 (108.9)	44.5 (112.1)	46.9 (116.4)	41.0 (105.8)	40.2 (104.4)	40.0 (104.0)	40.0 (104.0)	41.7 (107.1)	38.4 (101.1)	46.9 (116.4)
Mean daily maximum °C (°F)	22.2 (72.0)	24.6 (76.3)	26.7 (80.1)	30.4 (86.7)	33.2 (91.8)	34.2 (93.6)	31.5 (88.7)	31.0 (87.8)	29.0 (84.2)	27.4 (81.3)	24.4 (75.9)	21.9 (71.4)	28.0 (82.4)
Daily mean °C (°F)	12.2 (54.0)	14.6 (58.3)	16.9 (62.4)	20.5 (68.9)	23.6 (74.5)	26.0 (78.8)	24.5 (76.1)	23.9 (75.0)	22.1 (71.8)	19.0 (66.2)	15.1 (59.2)	12.2 (54.0)	19.2 (66.6)
Mean daily minimum °C (°F)	2.2 (36.0)	4.6 (40.3)	7.1 (44.8)	10.7 (51.3)	14.0 (57.2)	17.8 (64.0)	17.6 (63.7)	16.9 (62.4)	15.1 (59.2)	10.5 (50.9)	5.8 (42.4)	2.5 (36.5)	10.4 (50.7)
Record low °C (°F)	−8.7 (16.3)	−13.0 (8.6)	−4.0 (24.8)	−2.0 (28.4)	1.0 (33.8)	6.2 (43.2)	1.0 (33.8)	9.0 (48.2)	0.0 (32.0)	−1.0 (30.2)	−7.0 (19.4)	−9.5 (14.9)	−13.0 (8.6)
Average precipitation mm (inches)	9.3 (0.37)	5.3 (0.21)	10.7 (0.42)	2.9 (0.11)	12.9 (0.51)	45.4 (1.79)	92.6 (3.65)	94.8 (3.73)	88.0 (3.46)	28.2 (1.11)	10.4 (0.41)	5.2 (0.20)	405.7 (15.97)
Average precipitation days (≥ 0.1 mm)	1.7	1.1	1.4	0.7	2.0	5.8	11.1	10.7	9.3	3.6	2.0	1.3	50.7
Source: Servicio Meteorologico Nacional
