= Jalapa, Baja California =

Jalapa
- Location in Mexico
- Coordinates: 32°27′59″N 115°11′52″W
- Country: Mexico
- State: Baja California
- Elevation: 56 ft (17 m)

Population (2010)
  - City: 671
  - Urban: 0
- Time zone: UTC–08:00 (Zona Noroeste)
  - Summer (DST): UTC–07:00 (DST)
- Area code: +52 686

Jalapa is an ejido in the Mexican state of Baja California. It is located at 32°27′59″N 115°11′52″W in the dried-up delta of the Colorado River. It lies within Mexicali Municipality.

Its postal code is 21700 and its long-distance telephone dialing code is 686.
