= Jalapa, Tabasco =

City in the Mexican state of Tabasco

Jalapa is a small city in the Mexican state of Tabasco. It is located at 17°42′N 92°48′W.

Jalapa also serves as the administrative centre for the surrounding municipality of the same name, which covers a total surface area of 642.91 km² and, in the year 2000 census, reported a population of 32,773.
