= Abasolo, Durango =

Town in the Mexican state of Durango

Abasolo
- Town
- Location within Mexico
- Coordinates: 25°18′N 104°40′W
- Country: Mexico
- State: Durango
- Municipality: Rodeo

Abasolo is a small town that is part of the municipality of Rodeo in the Mexican state of Durango.

== Geography ==
It is located next to the Nazas River which originates at the Sierra Madre Occidental. The nearest city is Rodeo, which is the head of the municipality.
