= Canutillo, Durango =

Village in Durango, Mexico

Canutillo is a village in Ocampo Municipality in Durango, Mexico. Canutillo has a population of about 614 residents. It is the site of Hacienda de Pancho Villa at 26.383°N 105.3684°W.
