= Dautillos =

Coordinates: 24°43′N 107°58′W

Dautillos is a town in the municipality of Navolato, Mexico. It is one meter above sea level.

== Agriculture ==
Dautillos inhabitants live off of the sea. Fishing and aquaculture are dominant forms of agriculture in the area. Mangrove swamps cover much of the shores of Dautillos. Native fauna include Frigate birds, Ospreys, seagulls, and pelicans. Deer are scarce in the desert surrounding Dautillos. People gather Clams, various fishes, and crabs. During Autumn and early winter, Prawn trawling takes over the fishing village as the main produce. Dautillos also has many Mango and palm trees that are common throughout the coastal region of Sinaloa.

== Demographics ==
Dautillos is home for 2270 inhabitants. About 59 percent of the local population are adults. While the medium quantity of years at school is 7.45 years, there are still about 100 persons who don't know write or read. 8 people are of indigenous origin and a total of 1 individuals older than 5 years still speak an indigenous language.

== Cultures ==
Dautillos has a few clean beaches that have been cleared of Mangrove but many residents go to El Tambor, a beach that is on the Pacific Ocean. Recreational activities include fishing and ATV riding on the nearby sand dunes. Dautillos is located 47 miles from Culiacan.

== Geography ==
The area surrounding Dautillos is arid and desert like. Dautillos lies in the Bay of Santa Maria surrounded by estuaries. To the west of Dautillos is the Pacific Ocean and to the East there is the distant mountain range of the Sierra Madre Occidental. Dautillos' climate is hot and humid in the summer and fall and, cooling down in winter, and rises steadily in the spring.
