= Area code 674 (Mexico) =

Mexican area code 674 serves several municipalities in the western highlands in the State of Durango. The area code was created in 2002 as a result of the consolidation of location specific area codes 181, 182 and 183. The local area code went from 186 and 187 to 1, at the same time, the local number length increased from 5 to 7 digits. In the process, the area code went from designating a city or town to designating a geographical area. The 674 area code is centered in Santiago Papasquiaro. The original code for the city of Santiago Papasquiaro was 186. A total of 206,286 numbers have been assigned to this area code as of November 2018. There is one state in the area code.

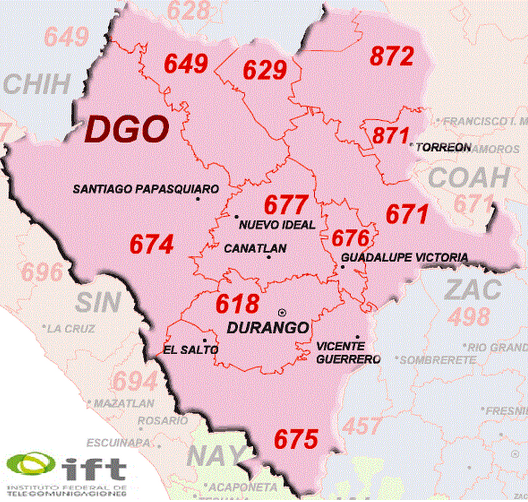
Durango State Area Codes

State	INEGI Code
Durango	10

Municipality	INEGI Code
CANELAS	10002
OTAEZ	10019
TAMAZULA	10034
TEPEHUANES	10035
SANTIAGO PAPASQUIARO	10032
TOPIA	10037
GUANACEVI	10009
SAN DIMAS	10026

Cities and Towns in the area code: 23

Town	INEGI Code
CANELAS	100020001
CAZADERO, EL	100320024
CIENEGA DE NUESTRA SEÑORA DE GUADALUPE	100320728
DURAZNO, EL	100340675
GARAME DE ABAJO	100320050
GUANACEVI	100090001
HERRERA, LOS	100320055
JOSE MARIA MORELOS (CHINACATES)	100320079
LOZANO ZAVALA (LA CAMPANA)	100320018
NUEVO SAN DIEGO (EL CABALLO)	100320208
OTAEZ (SANTA MARIA DE OTAEZ)	100190001
PURISIMA, LA	100350070
SAN JOSE DE LA BOCA	100350080
SAN MIGUEL DE CRUCES	100260089
SAN NICOLAS	100320125
SAN NICOLAS DE PRESIDIO (PRESIDIO DE ARRIBA)	100350066
SANTA CATARINA DE TEPEHUANES	100350001
SANTIAGO PAPASQUIARO	100320001
TAMAZULA DE VICTORIA (TAMAZULA)	100340001
TAYOLTITA	100260001
TOPIA	100370001
VENCEDORES	100260110
ZAPE, EL	100090087

Companies providing phone service in the area code: 28

Company
IP MATRIX
MEGACABLE
MOVISTAR
QBOCEL
SERVITRON
TALKTEL
TELCEL
TELECOMUNICACIONES 360
TELMEX
TV REY

Local Number: 7 Digits

From	To a Landline	To a Cell Phone (Caller paid CPP)	To a Cell Phone (Receiver paid MPP)
Landline (Local dialing)	7 digits	044 + 674 + 7 digits	7 digits
Cell (Local dialing)	7 digits	674 + 7 digits	7 digits
Landline (Long distance)	01 + 674 + 7 digits	045 + 674 + 7 digits	01 + 674 + 7 digits
Cell (Long distance)	01 + 674 + 7 digits	045 + 674 + 7 digits	01 + 674 + 7 digits

International dialing: +52 + 674 + 7 digits
