= Barreales =

- Village
- Barreales
- Location in Chile
- Coordinates: 34°38′27″S 71°22′27″W
- Country: Chile
- Region: (O'Higgins Region) Libertador General Bernardo O'Higgins
- Province: (Colchagua Province) Colchagua
- Commune: Santa Cruz

Barreales is a Chilean village located in Santa Cruz, Colchagua Province, Libertador General Bernardo O'Higgins Region.

It was also formerly known as (El) Barrial, (Los) Barriales, and Los Barreales.
