= San Ignacio Río Muerto =

Town in Sonora, Mexico

Coordinates: 27.415°N 110.245°W

San Ignacio Río Muerto is a small town which is the capital of San Ignacio Río Muerto Municipality in the southwest of the Mexican state of Sonora.

== Health and education ==
There were 54 schools and one small health clinic in 2000.

== Economy ==
Agriculture covered 35,000 productive hectares (2000), most of which were irrigated. Main crops are wheat, garbanzo beans, safflower, sorghum, watermelon, chile and melons. Agricultural production is transported to Ciudad Obregón for packing and export to the United States.

Cattle raising is carried out on a small scale and there were more than 6,000 head in 2000.
