= Esqueda =

Esqueda is a surname. Notable people with the surname include:

- Diego Esqueda (born 1988), Mexican footballer
- Enrique Esqueda (born 1988), Mexican footballer
- Luis Ricardo Esqueda (born 1981), Mexican footballer
- Rafael Márquez Esqueda (1947–2002), Mexican footballer
