= Cibuta =

Town in Sonora, Mexico

Coordinates: 31°04′N 110°54′W

El Cibuta is a town in the Mexican state of Sonora. The name is native and means “feather head dress” in the Tohono O’odham language the original inhabitants of the area. See the publication Trails to Tiburón The 1894 and 1895 Field Diaries of W J McGee

Cibuta was founded by Jesuit missionary Eusebio Kino as San Simón y San Judas del Síboda.

La Colonia Agrícola y Ganadera El Cibuta es un pueblo perteneciente al Municipio de Nogales, Sonora. Su actividad económica es diversa. En "El Cibuta" hay una maquiladora de Nombre PTM (Precission Technical Molding) la cual es fuente de empleo. Cuenta con diversidad de abarrotes como lo son una filial de la Compañía Nacional de Subsistencias Populares y de la Distribuidora CONASUPO, S.A. y Abarrotes REYNA, S. de R.L. de C.V. Propiedad de Eliseo Amado Flores y Familia.

El Cibuta cuenta con el Ing. Luis Alberto Godínez Huerta quien es Comisario y los Oficiales de la Policía Municipal Preventiva los Lic. Edmundo Villegas y Enrique Serna. Cuenta con una clínica del IMSS Bienestar en la cual se ofrece atención medica gratuita.

El Cibuta vive tiempos de transformación. el Ing. Luis Alberto Godínez Huerta de la Mano del Ing. Juan Francisco Gim Nogales, Presidente Municipal de Nogales, han implementado acciones de gobierno para revertir el atraso en infraestructura.

Nogales y Cibuta forman parte de la #FronteraDeTodos
