= Puerto Libertad =

- Municipality and village
- Location within Misiones Province Location within Argentina
- Country: Argentina
- Province: Misiones Province

Government
  - Mayor: Ramón Ferreira Luis Ferreira

Area
  - Total: 336 sq mi (871 km^{2})
- Elevation: 750 ft (230 m)

Population (2001)
  - Total: 6,143
  - Density: 18/sq mi (7/km^{2})
- Time zone: UTC−3 (ART)

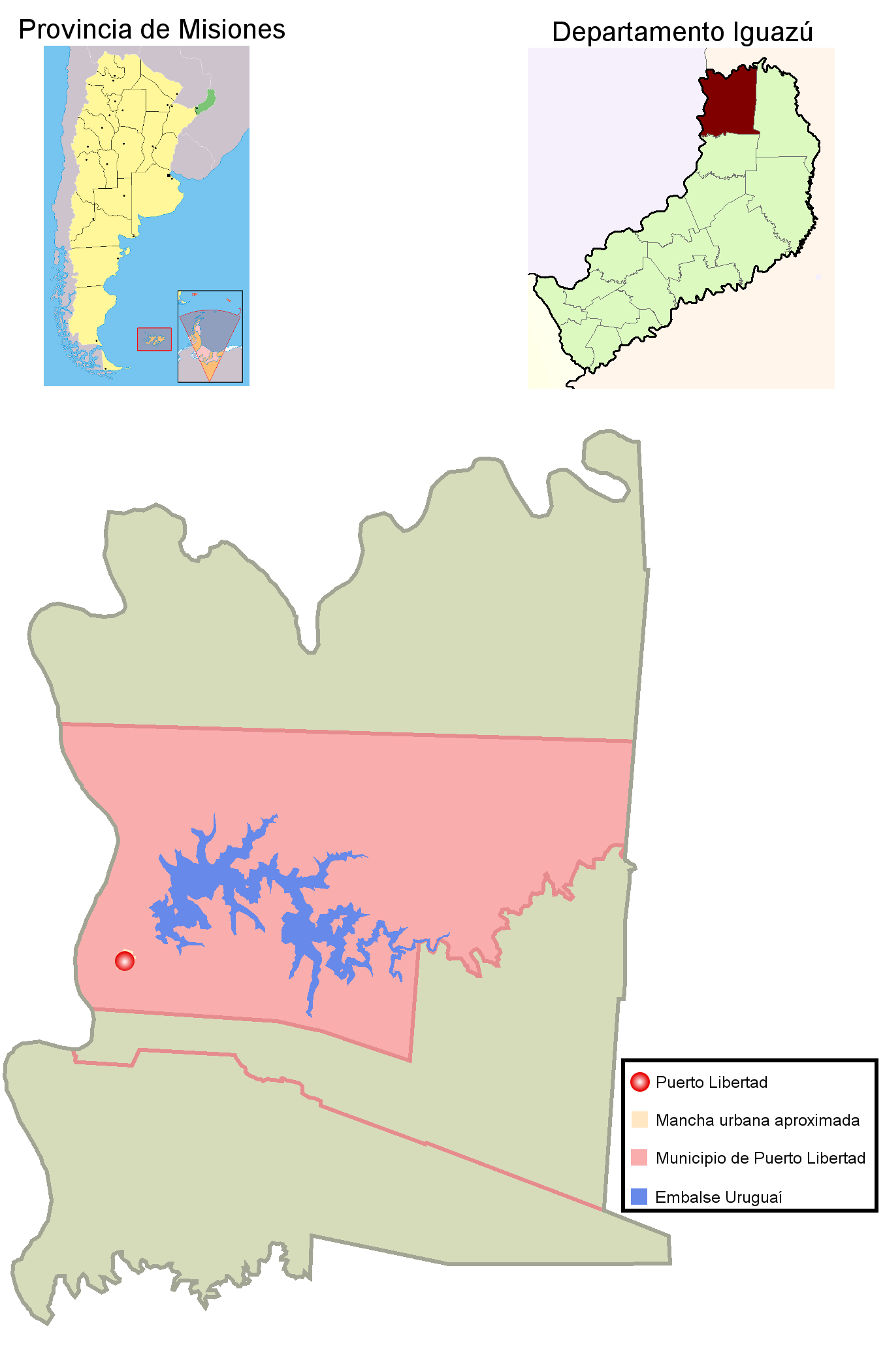
Map of the area around Puerto Libertad.

Puerto Libertad is a village and municipality in Misiones Province in north-eastern Argentina. It is located in the Iguazu Department, 25 km south of Iguazu Falls and 5 km from the Paraná River. It has a population of 6,143 inhabitants (Census 2001).

== History ==
A settlement in the area was created in the late nineteenth century with the arrival of factories which employed people to harvest yerba mate on the Paraná River.

The town, which was originally known as Villa Veinticinco de Mayo, developed steadily, and already had its first school in 1927, and a year later a post office. The census of 1929 indicated a total of 1,190 inhabitants.

In 1950, the first Development Commission was created with the name of "17 de Octubre", in honor of the Peronist Party. Because of the political connotations of the name, the military coup that overthrew Juan Domingo Perón gave the town the name of Libertad in 1955. By 1971, the town had 3,500 residents.

The latest economic development was the construction of the Uruguaí Dam, 5 km from the village on the Uruguaí creek.
