= San Bruno, Baja California Sur =

San Bruno
- Location in Mexico
- Coordinates: 27°09′37″N 112°09′31″W
- Country: Mexico
- State: Baja California Sur

San Bruno is a populated place at the Gulf of California in Mulegé Municipality in the Mexican state of Baja California Sur. It is located at 27°09′37″N 112°09′31″W, about 20 kilometers north of the city of Mulegé. The town has 623 inhabitants as per the 2010 census population and is situated at an elevation of 1 meter (3 ft.) above sea level.

The short-lived Jesuit Misión San Bruno (1683-1685) was not located near the present town of San Bruno, but more than 110 kilometres (68 mi) to the south, about 25 kilometres (16 mi) north of the city of Loreto.

== Climate ==
This area has a large amount of sunshine year round due to its stable descending air and high pressure. According to the Köppen Climate Classification system, San Bruno has a desert climate, abbreviated "BWh" on climate maps.

== See also ==
- Spanish missions in Baja California
