= Casa de Pancho Villa =

Historic house museum in La Coyotada, Durango, Mexico

Coordinates: 24.74548°N 104.45392°W

The Casa de Pancho Villa or Rancho de la Coyotada is a historic house museum and the birthplace of Mexican Revolution leader Pancho Villa. It is located in the hamlet of La Coyotada, near the municipal seat of San Juan del Río, Durango. Located near the banks of the Río San Juan, the house is a notable example of popular architecture of the Porfiriato era. The house was strategically built to coexist with the local climate, as well as to have proper illumination and ventilation, as it is assumed with its L-shaped form.
