= Loma Blanca =

Coordinates: 30°39′S 66°09′W

- Municipality and village
- Interactive map of Loma Blanca
- Country: Argentina
- Province: La Rioja Province
- Time zone: UTC−3 (ART)
- Climate: BSh

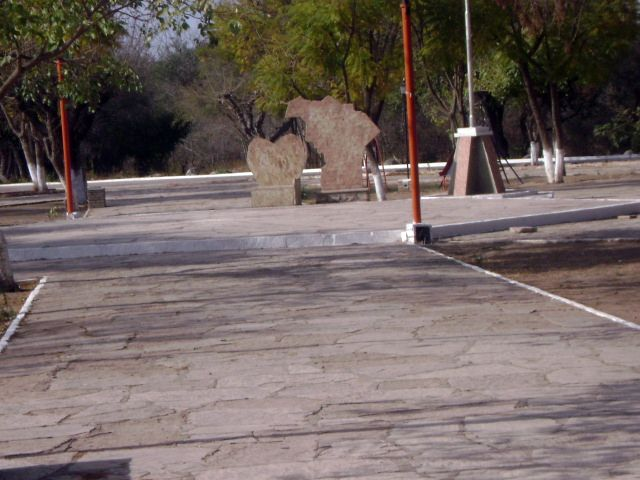
Old Loma Blanca Square

Loma Blanca is a municipality and village in La Rioja Province in northwestern Argentina.
