= San Lorenzo, Chihuahua =

Town in the Mexican state of Chihuahua

San Lorenzo
- Village
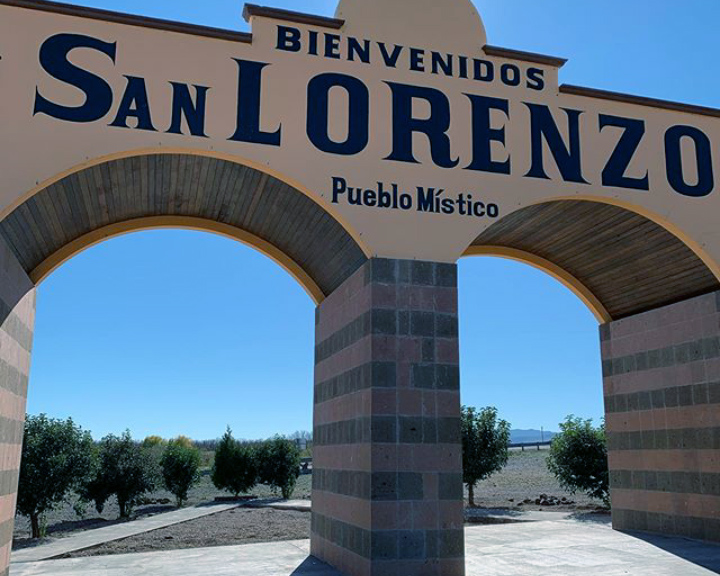
- Welcome to San Lorenzo sign
- Nickname: san lencho
- Location in Mexico
- Coordinates: 29°42′N 106°6′W
- Country: Mexico
- State: Chihuahua
- Municipality: Dr. Belisario Domínguez

Population (2010)
  - Total: 441

San Lorenzo is a town and seat of the municipality of Dr. Belisario Domínguez, in the northern Mexican state of Chihuahua. As of 2010, the town had a population of 441, up from 308 as of 2005.
