= Buenaventura Municipality =

Municipality in the Mexican state of Chihuahua

Buenaventura
- Municipality
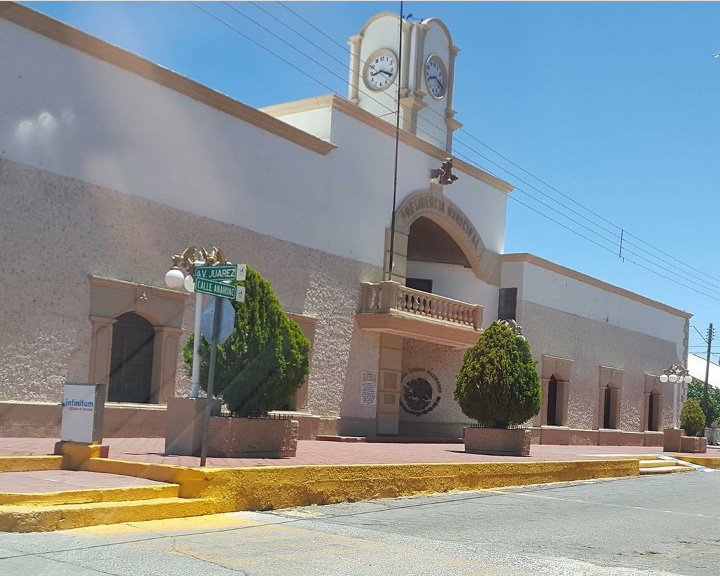
- Municipal Palace

- Municipality of Buenaventura in Chihuahua
- Coordinates: 29°50′N 107°28′W
- Country: Mexico
- State: Chihuahua
- Municipal seat: San Buenaventura

Area
  - Total: 8,938.3 km^{2} (3,451.1 sq mi)

Population (2010)
  - Total: 22,378

Buenaventura is one of the 67 municipalities of Chihuahua, in northern Mexico. The municipal seat lies at San Buenaventura. The municipality covers an area of 8,938.3 km^{2} (3,451.1 sq mi).

As of 2010, the municipality had a total population of 22,378, up from 20,533 as of 2005.

The municipality had 237 localities, the largest of which (with 2010 populations in parentheses) were: San Buenaventura (6,957), Ejido Benito Juárez (5,778), Constitución (2,709), Flores Magón (2,510), classified as urban, and Rodrigo M. Quevedo (1,367), classified as rural.

== Geography ==
=== Towns and villages ===
Name	Population (2005)
San Buenaventura	9,402
Ejido Benito Juárez	5,199
Flores Magón	2,547
Constitución	2,439
San Lorenzo	946
Total Municipality	20,533
