= Jalapa del Valle =

Mexican village in Oaxaca

Coordinates: 17°04′N 96°53′W

Jalapa del Valle is a village in the Mexican state of Oaxaca, some 12 km to the northwest of state capital Oaxaca, Oax.
