= San Buenaventura, Chihuahua =

San Buenaventura
- City
- Nickname: "El Valle"
- Motto(s): "TIERRA BUENA, RAZA NOBLE"
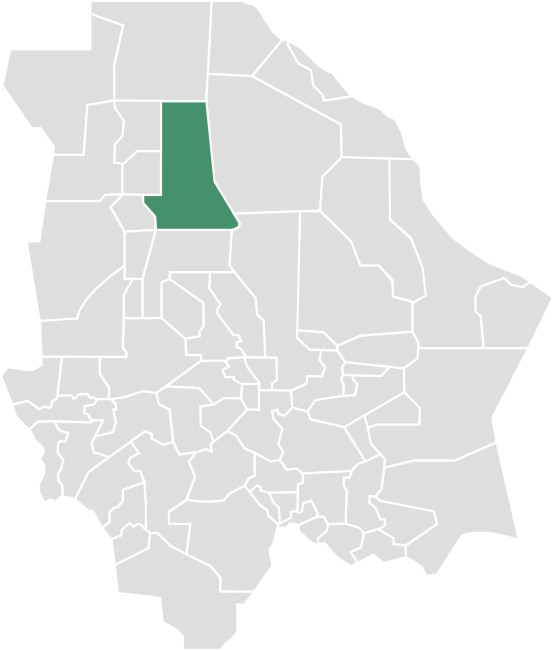
- Municipality of Buenaventura in Chihuahua

- Location in Mexico
- Coordinates: 29°50′N 107°28′W
- Country: Mexico
- State: Chihuahua
- Municipality: Buenaventura

Area
  - Total: 8,938.29 km^{2} (3,451.09 sq mi)

Population (2010)
  - Total: 6,957
- Demonym: Buenaventurense or Vallero
- Patron saint's day: 14 July
- Website: http://www.e-local.gob.mx/work/templates/enciclo/chihuahua/Mpios/08010a.htm

San Buenaventura (named for St. Bonaventure) is a city in the Mexican state of Chihuahua. It serves as the municipal seat for the Buenaventura Municipality.

As of 2010, the municipality had a total population of 6,957, down from 9,402 as of 2005.

== History ==
In 1660 Capitán Juan de Munguía and Villela and Fr. Gerónimo de Birues founded the settlement of The Valley of San Buenaventura with Chinarra and Suma people.

== Demography ==
=== Ethnicities ===
The vast majority of the population is Mestizo, they are descended from the Spanish settlers and the Chinarra and Suma people.
