= Pesqueira, Sonora =

Town in Sonora, Mexico

Coordinates: 29°22′32″N 110°54′07″W

Pesqueira is a town in the San Miguel de Horcasitas Municipality, located in the center of the Mexican state of Sonora. The town is the most populated locality of the municipality, even more than the municipal head, the town of San Miguel de Horcasitas. According to data from the Population and Housing Census conducted in 2010 by the National Institute of Statistics and Geography (INEGI), Pesqueira has a total of 5,699 inhabitants.
