= Flores Magón, Chihuahua =

Town in Chihuahua, Mexico

- Town
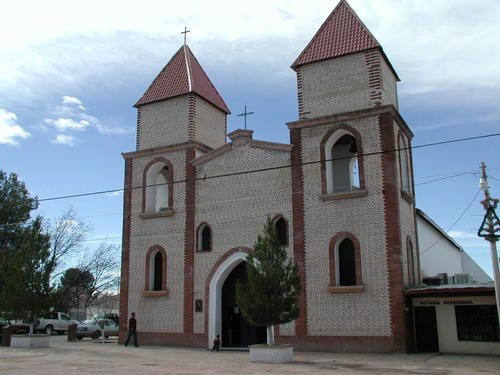
- The Nuestra Señora del Carmen Church in Flores Magón
- Interactive map of Flores Magón, Chihuahua

Flores Magón is a town in the Mexican state of Chihuahua and is a part of the municipality of Buenaventura. As of 2024, the town has a population of 2,626; the fourth largest in the municipality.

== Geography ==
Flores Magón is located at 29.944162°N 106.957758°W (29.944162, -106.957758) and is at an altitude of 1,455 meters (~4,773.6 feet) above sea level. The town spans an area of 2.721 km² (~1.051 mi²) with a population density of 965.2/km².

== Demographics ==
In 2005, the population had 1,300 females and 1,247 males for a combined total of 2,547 people. In 2010, the population had 1,256 females and 1,254 males (total of 2,510). In 2020, the population had 1,364 females and 1,262 males (total of 2,626).

In 2010, the percentage of people who were indigenous was 0.36% while 0.28% spoke an indigenous language. In 2020, both of these were 0%.
