= Henry C. A. Damm =

American diplomat (1874–1929)

Henry C. A. Damm (1874-1929) was a United States diplomat.

== Biography ==
Damm was born Henry Christian Augustus Damm on January 19, 1874, to Conrad and Maria Damm in Waushara County, Wisconsin. In 1902 he married Alice Mary Anne Purdue. He died on August 24, 1929, in Nogales, Sonora.

== Career ==
Damm served as U.S. Consul in Cornwall, Ontario from 1909 to 1912; in Stettin, Poland from 1912 to 1915; in Aix-la-Chapelle, Germany from 1915 to 1917; in Stavanger, Norway from 1917 to 1919; in Christiana, Norway in 1918; in Copenhagen, Denmark from 1919 to 1920; in Málaga, Spain from 1920 to 1921; in Valencia, Spain from 1921 to 1922; and in Nogales from 1922 to 1929. While serving as Consul in Aix-la-Chapelle, he would be one of a group of American consuls who would be stranded in Munich, Germany during a diplomatic breakdown during World War I.
