= Vernon Pérez Rubio =

Mexican politician (born 1956)

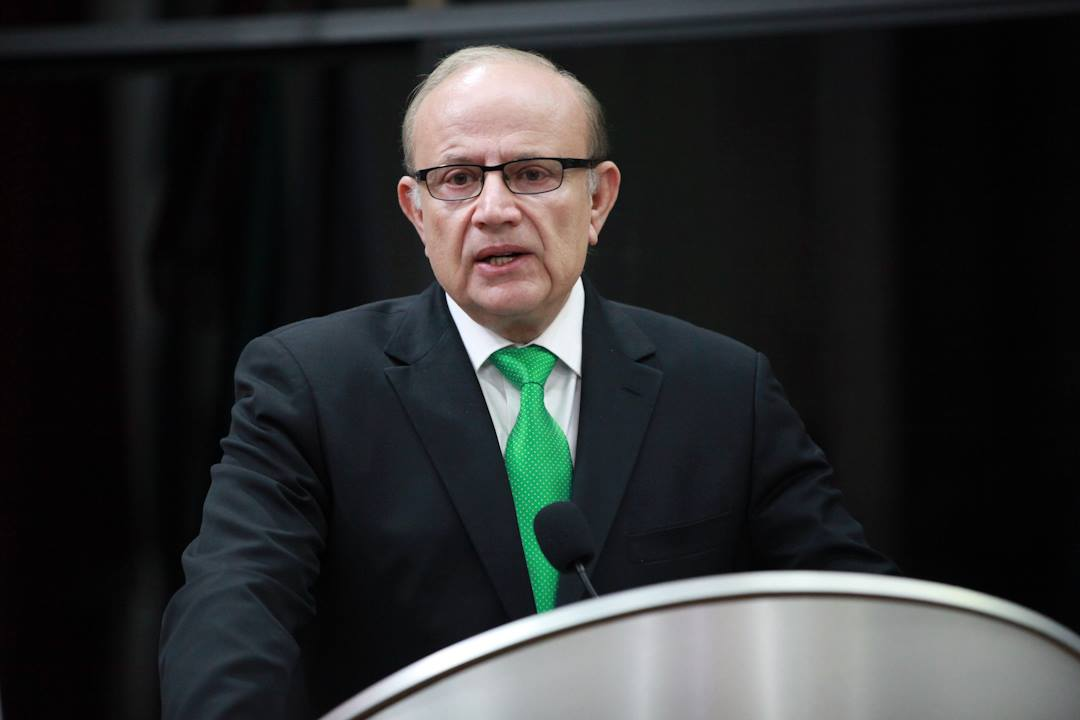

Member of the Congress of Sonora Plurinominal
- In office 16 September 2012 – 15 September 2015

Secretary of Urban Infrastructure and Ecology of Sonora
- In office 21 July 1993 – 12 September 1997
- Preceded by: Ignacio Cabrera Fernández
- Succeeded by: Manuel Ibarra Legorreta

Personal details
- Born: Vernon Pérez Rubio Artee; February 28, 1956 (age 70) Ciudad Obregón, Sonora, Mexico
- Party: PVEM
- Education: Universidad de Sonora
- Profession: Civil Engineer
- Website: Vernon.mx

Vernon Pérez Rubio Artee (born 28 February 1956) is a Mexican businessman and politician. At present, he is a local deputy, elected by proportional representation by the Ecologist Green Party of Mexico, in the LX Legislature of the Congress of Sonora.

== Education and career ==
His political activity started when he was named student representative in the Sonora Institute of Technology, on a student movement context in Sonora state at the end of the sixties and beginning of the seventies. He nearly faced governmental repression when the Candidate for Governor, Carlos Armando Biebrich, visited Ciudad Obregón as part of his campaign in 1973, in an environment of student rejection against him; state agents were accused of shooting inside the campus on this events. He was touched by this and it influenced his political views in the coming years. He was a member of the Mexican Communist Party from 1971 to 1974, during the party's clandestine period.

As he was enrolled on the Universidad de Sonora´s civil engineering program, he steps out of political activity, and obtains his first job in 1978 as draftsman in the Secretariat of Agrarian Reform. One year after finishing his studies, in 1980, he was promoted as Coordinator of the Yaqui and Mayo Program, on the same Secretariat. In 1983, he was hired as projector in the Sonora state government.

== Business career ==
He is a businessman since 1984, working as a constructor and real estate developer in housing, touristic and commercial projects; since that year, he is president and shareholder of Krane Group S.A. de C.V. This company gives consulting services for business for foreign investors in Mexico, such as: business analysis, site selection, legal consultation, construction, HR recruitment, cross-cultural training, and housing programs. In 1996 he becomes shareholder of Edificaciones Modernas de Sonora S.A. de C.V., a housing construction company in Nogales, Sonora. Since June, 2000, he is Secretary and Shareholder of Operadora de Negocios Inmobiliarios, S.A. de C.V. He is also president and shareholder of Inmobiliaria del Río Sonora S.A. de C.V. since October, 2002 to date, and from January, 2003 he is appointed president and shareholder of Afel Constructores S.A. de C.V.

== Political career and public service ==
He was appointed Chief Executive of Urban Development in Hermosillo Municipality in 1991, under Guatimoc Yberri's administration. This position was related with the development planification of the city of Hermosillo, activity that it will continue under other public service positions in the near future, working aside with the architect Gustavo Aguilar Beltran. During this appointment under the county's administration, he modified Hermosillo's downtown road structure, looking for a 35% improvement in efficiency.

=== State Government ===
In 1993, he was appointed Coordinator of the Commission of Goods and Concessions of the State of Sonora, a position created during Manlio Fabio Beltrones state administration, for the identification of the state goods and resources and, in order to use them efficiently. He left that position in 1993, and was appointed Secretary of Urban Infrastructure and Ecology, under the same administration. In this position, he boosted the work on the modernization of Hermosillo, among them, the Vado del Río Zone, the vaulting if Yucatán Street (among other pluvial modernization works), which included a 20 million pesos investment during the first three years of the Manlio Fabio Beltrones state administration; he also boosted the development of the Solidaridad Boulevard, as well as the creation of a vehicle inspection program.

He also upgraded the modernization of the north and northwest area of Sonora, mainly the municipalities of Puerto Peñasco, San Luis Rio Colorado, Plutarco Elías Calles, and Nogales. In Nogales, he worked on the city's drinking water total coverage, with a 20-year guaranteed service. This work was made as a result of the negotiation of federal and international resources, without using any county or state resources. In 1995, he became a member of the Advisory Council of the Border Ecological Cooperation Commission, until 1997. In Puerto Peñasco Municipality, he worked a zoning program, organizing a total of lands of 104, 385 hectares, of which highlights 10,971 hectares for a touristic reserve and productive activities, 8,671 hectares for a low-density touristic-housing reservation, and 6,462 hectares for a medium-density touristic-housing reservation.

=== Other positions ===
During the nineties he was part of several business and union councils. He was treasurer of the Civil Engineers College of Sonora, from 1992 to 1994, and member of the Board of Directors of the Banco del Atlántico in Hermosillo from 1993 to 1996. He was also part of the Board of Directors of the Arrendadora Nacional de la Industria de la Construcción, from 1991 to 1994; and vice-president of the Construction Industry Credit Union of Sonora (UCIC by its Spanish initials) from 1992 to 1994, as well as president from 2000 to 2003.

==== President of the Construction Industry Credit Union of Sonora ====
During this period, he recovered the external found of the Construction Industry Credit Union of Sonora (UCIC by its initials in Spanish), establishing new recovery policies of the performing loans, recovering 7.9 million pesos for capital concept, while it was already registered with a loan losses tag in the beginning of the same period. The same loan losses condition was reduced to zero by the end of his demarche. During this period, 24 new partners were added the de UCIC, passing from 78 to 102. The costs of administration were reduced versus the given credits, from 16.4% to 3.8%. In terms of the default rate, he accomplished an 80% recovery, without the need of any lawsuit, passing from 9.8 million pesos to 1.9 million pesos. By December 2002, the current loan portfolio growth in 733.55% with respect to April 2000, wherewith, credits were given for:

- Housing programs.
- Asphalt plants.
- Block factories.
- Equipment acquisition.
- Physical facilities.
- Working Capital.
- Modernisation of agricultural irrigation systems
- Mining industry

The UCIC equity's was increased from 30.3 million pesos in April 2000 to 42.3 million pesos in December 2002.

==== President of the Sonoran Delegation of the Mexican Chamber of the Construction Industry ====
He was President of the Sonoran Delegation of the Mexican Chamber of the Construction Industry (CMIC) from February 2003 to February 2005. During this period, two integrator companies were created, as well as a master's degree in Real Estate and National Assets Valuation; he also merged a few lands in order to construct the CMIC's offices. Two years later, he was appointed President of the Advisory Council of the CMIC, from February 2007 to February 2009. He is also a member of the same Advisory Council since 2003.

== Deputy of the LX Legislature ==
As a local deputy of the Congress of Sonora he has created and lobbied already approved laws, as the Animal Protection Law (Ley de Protección Animal), and the Schools Psychologists Law (Ley de Psicólogos en las Escuelas). He has denounced frauds, as well as attempts of frauds, like an official bidding processes of a bridge by the Department of Infrastructure and Urban Development of Sonora State, located in the intersection of Luis Encinas Boulevard and Navarrete Boulevard, in the city of Hermosillo, as well as an alleged fraud by the Secretary of Economy of Sonora State and the Transportation Modernization State Found (FEMOT by its Spanish initials), regarding a credit agreement of 600 million pesos.

=== Legislations, commissions, and denouncements ===
==== Animal Protection Law ====
This law was presented by Pérez Rubio, with the support of Sonoran non-governmental organizations, such as COAT and Pata de Perro; this is the first state law that prohibited bullfighting in Mexico. The law had a unanimously approbation by the LX Legislature of the Congress of Sonora on 2 May 2013; it also had the support 18,200 citizens, and it establish, among other things, that pet owners are obligated to shelter them in a dignified place, that pets must be identified with a basic data plate in order to find the owners, that pets must be vaccinated, that pets can not be brought to marches or mass protests, that pets can not be sold in public places or popular fairs, and that pets can not be executed violently.

==== School Psychologists Law ====
This law was presented by Pérez Rubio, and its approval was made by the Committee of Education and Culture of the LX Congress Legislature of the State of Sonora, unanimously approved in the plenary session on 24 October 2013. This law adds a third paragraph on the 17th Article of the State of Sonora Education Law, and it fundamentally aims to establish the right for the Basic Education alumni to have a professional psychological counselor, for every 300 students. The law's objective is to place 2,200 psychologists on the schooling system in a 5-year period, starting with the 20% of them, on the 2014 - 2015 school period.

=== Commissions ===
Pérez Rubio was part of the following commissions in the LX Legislature of the Congress of Sonora:

- Education and Culture Commission
- Justice and Human Rights Commission
- Public Safety Commission
- Building and Public Services Commission
- Border Affairs Commission
- Energy and Environmental Commission
- Science and Technology Commission
- Water Commission
- Housing Commission

=== Accusations ===
==== Accusation on the fraud attempt on the official bidding processes of a lower bridge in Hermosillo ====
Pérez Rubio made an accusation against the Sonora government on a fraud attempt on the official bidding processes of a lower bridge in the city of Hermosillo, during an ordinary session of the LX Congress Legislature of the State of Sonora, on September 24, 2013. The alleged fraud consist, initially, on the construction tender, which was made for trimmings, sidewalks, and asphalt pavement construction on the city of San Luis Río Colorado, on the Quintana Roo Avenue, beginning in 26th street, and ending on 12th street. Three days later, the Department of Infrastructure and Urban Development of Sonora State announced the alleged mistake, changing the type of construction work as well as the ubication, calling for a bidding of a lower bridge in the intersection of Navarrete Boulevard and Luis Encinas Boulevard in Hermosillo. Based on this mistake, from which a series of irregularities came up, Deputy Vernon Pérez Rubio proposed that the case should have an obvious and urgent resolution on the Local Congress, trying to speed up these case; nevertheless, the National Action Party parliamentary section did not approved the action, turning the case to the Public Building Commission, headed by the Deputy Ignacio Garcia Fierros.

==== Accusation on public transportation fraud ====
Pérez Rubio, with the collaboration of the parliamentary section of the Institutional Revolutionary Party coordinator, Carlos Samuel Moreno Terán, presented a request for complain because of a fraud on diversion of funds for 600 million pesos, against the Secretary of Treasury of Sonora, Carlos Villalobos Organista, and against de former Director of the Transportation Modernization State Found (FEMOT by its Spanish initials), Victor Alcaraz. The fraud diversion allegedly started when the LIX Congress Legislature of the State of Sonora, contracted a loan of 600 million pesos for the FEMOT, in order to bring financial support to the public transportation concession holders in March, 2011; this amount of money was delivered to the FEMOT on April 17 and August 9, 2012. The FEMOT received 600 million pesos as a result of two contracted bank loans with BANCA MIFEL S.A.: one of them for 400 million pesos, and the other one for 200 million pesos. This money was transferred to the BANCA MIFEL's checking account No. 3400101359, under the name of FEMOT. The investigation started in July 2013, based on an information request to the Superior Auditing and Fiscalization Institute (ISAF by its Spanish initials). The conclusions from this request are:

- The FEMOT did not register any deposit for 400 or 200 million pesos.
- The FEMOT withdrawals 569 million pesos, without noticing any recipient or concept of any payment. The withdraws were made on 17 April and 10 August 2012.
- The FEMOT declared receiving the amount of 178.9 million pesos from the State Government, under the concept of the FEMOT credit, without any proof of it, being declared by the Treasury Department that this amount of money was from the dependency and not from the credit.
- The 2012's public account does not indicates any proof of the FEMOT money being received by the State Government.

On August 21, 2013, a complaint was presented with the State General Comptroller's Office in order to point administrative accountability on the implicated public employees and, in case of finding criminal conducts, notice it to the Public Prosecutor, according to the 118th article of the State of Sonora Penal Code Procedures. The State General Comptroller delayed her appearance before the State Congress until January 16, 2014. On September 3, 2013, the ISAF delivered an up-to-date documentation on the destiny of the 600 million pesos, justifying payments by the Treasury Department before receiving the FEMOT credit; likewise, the Department of Treasury indicated a 280 million pesos payment to a company "Aseosres Unidos de Sonora GIA AUSUG, S.A. de C.V." which would be responsible for the public transportation credit. Pérez Rubio also denounced that this company was not authorized by the Federal Government, and also, that it counts with a $100,000.00 capital.

Preceded by Cesar Augusto Marcor Ramírez	Local Deputy from Sonora Proportional Representation; 2012–Present	Succeeded by In Office
Preceded by Ignacio Cabrera Fernández	Secretary of Urban Infrastructure and Ecology of Sonora; 1993–1997	Succeeded by Manuel Ibarra Legorreta
