= Adriana Yadira Gallego =

Chicana painter, public artist, and arts administrator

Adriana Yadira Gallego (born 1974) is a Chicana painter, public artist, and arts administrator. Her focus is on feminism and civil rights.

Adriana discusses her perspective on the treatment of individuals at the U.S.-Mexico border, expressing frustration with the way they are often labeled as "wetbacks," "foreigners," "undocumented," and "bean-eaters" before being recognized as human beings. She highlights instances where people justify violence, including the beating and assault of undocumented individuals, leading her to question the nature of the border phenomenon. Adriana describes the border as extending beyond physical and international boundaries, encompassing internal and external struggles that transcend cultural and generational divisions.

== Biography ==
Gallego was born and raised in Nogales, Sonora, Mexico. In 1997, Gallego graduated magna cum laude from the College of Fine Arts at the University of Arizona in Tucson. After graduation and an apprenticeship at the Alternative Museum in New York, she moved to California where she completed public art projects, became an arts educator in state prisons, and began her career in arts administration at the Norton Simon Museum in Pasadena, California. She returned to Tucson to work for the Arizona Commission on the Arts as a director of strategic initiative before moving to San Antonio, Texas, where she worked at the National Association of Latino Arts and Cultures as the group's CEO for nearly a decade.

== Art ==
- Centaura is an acrylic on wood painting of a woman riding a white horse on fire over a machine gun, milk bottle and black shoes.
- Manifiesto is a visual of a strong women in fight holding a snake, above her are eagle claws. The piece exemplifies a woman taking over kingdom and changing their destiny the title Manifesto alludes to a manifestation as a demonstration or protest.The piece hints at the idea of women taking over kingdoms and changing their own traditions.
- Devil's Rope is a part of seven acrylic art pieces that all go together. The painting shoes a visual of three beautifully drawn hands intertwined with barbered wire.The painting shows the three hands successively moving through the wire.The art piece is part of a bigger story, Gallegos' father shared with her the horrifying stories of migrants' damaging and harming their hands while trying to cross the border. Gallego, through her seven acrylic art pieces told the story of what it is like for migrants to embark on the long journey of crossing the border.

== Accomplishments ==
- In 1997, Gallego was the youngest recipient of the Ford Foundation's Siqueiros-Pollock Binational Award.
- Gallego was one of a few artists featured in a year-long exhibition at the Tucson Museum of Art.
- Gallego has received numerous tributes and exhibits of her work in museums, galleries, and cultural centers throughout the United States, Mexico, and Puerto Rico.
- Gallego is a founding member of Raices Taller 222 Gallery and Workshop
