= The Alternative Museum =

- Former name: The Alternative Center for International Arts Inc.
- Established: 1975
- Dissolved: 2000
- Type: Art museum
- Website: www.alternativemuseum.org

The Alternative Museum was founded in 1975 by artists for artists and the broader New York City community in the United States. Its primary purpose was to present works of art created by artists of conscience through exhibitions of contemporary art, world music concerts, performances and panel discussions. Art works that focused on social and political issues were given primary consideration for presentation.

== History ==
The Alternative Museum was founded in December, 1975. It closed its doors in April, 2000. It was at a number of locations in New York:

- First location: 28 East 4th Street, N.Y., N.Y. 10003.
- Second location: 17 White Street, N.Y., N.Y. 10013.
- Final location: 594 Broadway, N.Y., N.Y. 10012.

Its motto was: Ahead of the times and behind the issues.

The museum's founders were: Geno Rodriguez (AKA Eugene Rodriguez), Janice Rooney, and Robert Browning.

== Rationale ==
The Alternative Museum opened its doors in 1975 with an exhibition of 10 Japanese artists living in New York City. Founded and operated by artist Geno Rodriguez, Janice Rooney and Robert Browning, The Alternative Museum's primary functions were to provide a professional showcase for artists, leadership with an "artist" perspective within The Alternative Museum profession, and an atmosphere where ideas could be presented and challenged. Being non-profit, The Alternative Museum's choice of artistic presentation was not governed by commercial interests. At the same time, maintaining a small staff and apprentices, like Adriana Yadira Gallego, who worked closely with the participating artists minimized the bureaucracy that so often beset larger institutions and permitted the exploration of provocative projects.

The Alternative Museum became a complement to the larger established museums and a role model for newer artist founded organizations like Art in General and later on Exit Art.

== Location and space ==
Originally housed on New York City's East Village, at 4th Street between Lafayette Street and the Bowery, The Alternative Museum moved in 1980 to White Street in Tribeca. In the summer of 1991, it moved to its last physical location at 594 Broadway in SoHo, at that time the heart of New York's cultural scene. Its last facilities included 5,200 square feet (480 m^{2}) of exhibition space. Additional space for administration, and storage made up another 1,800 square feet (170 m^{2}).

== Goals ==
Starting in 1975, The Alternative Museum pioneered fully integrated programming; its mission always mandated that its exhibitions, concerts and cultural programs as well as the organization itself include equitable participation by people from all racial, economic and gender backgrounds.

In its 25-year history, The Alternative Museum presented over 300 exhibitions and more than 600 concerts, poetry readings, workshops and panel discussions. The Alternative Museum presented artists from almost every region of the United States as well as Europe, Asia, and Africa. The Alternative Museum's first exhibition was “10 Japanese Artists” which led the way to the many presentations of contemporary art works and artists from the diverse global community at a time when most contemporary arts institutions were only interested in Eurocentric art.

Through its integrated programs, The Alternative Museum developed a history and a catalogue archive of 25 years of issue-oriented art presentations. Creating a new paradigm, The Alternative Museum added a previously missing dimension to the American contemporary art scene that would later be emulated by many other art institutions.

The Alternative Museum produced professional quality catalogs for its major exhibitions. Each catalog included biographies of participating artists, artists’ statements, photographic documentation and essays by art historians, scholars, and critics. These catalogs are collected by major museums and libraries worldwide, which provide a unique service for museum professionals and the exhibited artists.

== Exhibitions ==
The Alternative Museum presented between five and seven exhibitions each year. Over its 25-year history, more than 2,700 artists exhibited at The Alternative Museum.

From its inception, The Alternative Museum presented ground-breaking thematic exhibitions focusing on the pressing issues of American society, creating an ongoing dialogue which examined the definitions and boundaries of art and contemporary society. Exhibitions focused artistic interpretation and critical attention on such issues as homelessness (DIA DE LOS MUERTOS: THE HOMELESS); media manipulation (Disinformation: The Manufacture of Consent); and racial, ethnic and gender stereotypes (Prisoners of Image). Syncretism explored the merging of distinct cultural traditions, while PEOPLE'S CHOICE examined the actual aesthetic preferences of the American people and the impact of market research on its society.

Equally important were The Alternative Museum's solo exhibitions, which included many of today's most known artists, including Luis Cruz Azaceta, Ching Ho Cheng, Komar and Melamid, Maureen Connor, Ben Sakoguchi, Luis Jimenez, Houston Conwill, Adrian Piper, Dennis Adams, Robert Blackburn (artist) and Tseng Kwong Chi.

Other artists, such as Hannah Wilke, David Hammonds, Alfredo Jaar, Leon Golub, Andres Serrano, Tim Rollins K.O.S., X Prez, and Group Material, were all exhibited at crucial moments in their careers.

Starting in the fall of 1996, The Alternative Museum refocused its programming direction by concentrating on media based arts such as photography, video, film, computer generated art, and multimedia electronic installations – a missing dimension of arts programming in the downtown area of Manhattan.

== Music program ==
In 1976, The Alternative Museum launched its World Music Program. For the first time, New York City had an ongoing venue where music from all over the world was presented in an informal environment that seated a maximum audience of 150 people. Traditional, folk, and modern music from India, Gambia, China, Peru, Ireland, the U.S., and many other countries found its way to American audiences. Concerts at The Alternative Museum looked like a gathering at the United Nations.

The Alternative Museum also provided a showcase for experimental work that had little chance of exposure in conventional concert halls. In 1985, the main emphasis of The Alternative Museum's Music Program became the presentation of new American music, including music with firm roots in the classical and jazz traditions. Composers and musicians who performed at The Alternative Museum include: Don Cherry, Joseph Jarman, Leroy Jenkins, The Kronos Quartet, Carman Moore, Bob Moran, Hamlet Bluiett, Joan La Barbara, Frank London, Horace Tapscott, Terry Riley, Richard Teitelbaum, John Zorn, Henry Threadgill, Glen Velez and Reggie Workman.
