= Marco Antonio Martínez Dabdoub =

Mexican politician

Municipal president of Nogales, Sonora
- In office 2006–2009
- Preceded by: Lorenzo Antonio de la Fuente Manríquez
- Succeeded by: José Angel Hernández Barajas

Personal details
- Party: PAN
- Occupation: Politician

Marco Antonio Martínez Dabdoub is a Mexican politician. Affiliated with the National Action Party (PAN), he served as the municipal president of Nogales, Sonora.

== Sources ==
- Luis Alatorre, Luis; Holley, Denise (October 16, 2008). "Mayor of Nogales, Sonora, Defends City – In Wake of U.S. Travel Alert". Nogales International. Retrieved September 4, 2013.
- Staff (November 18, 2007). "Lamentable el distanciamiento de Martínez Dabdoub con el PAN: Moreno Ward" [Rift Between PAN Leadership and Nogales Mayor Martinez Dabdoub]. Dossier Político (in Spanish).
