= Nogales, Sonora =

Nogales
- City
- Heroica Nogales
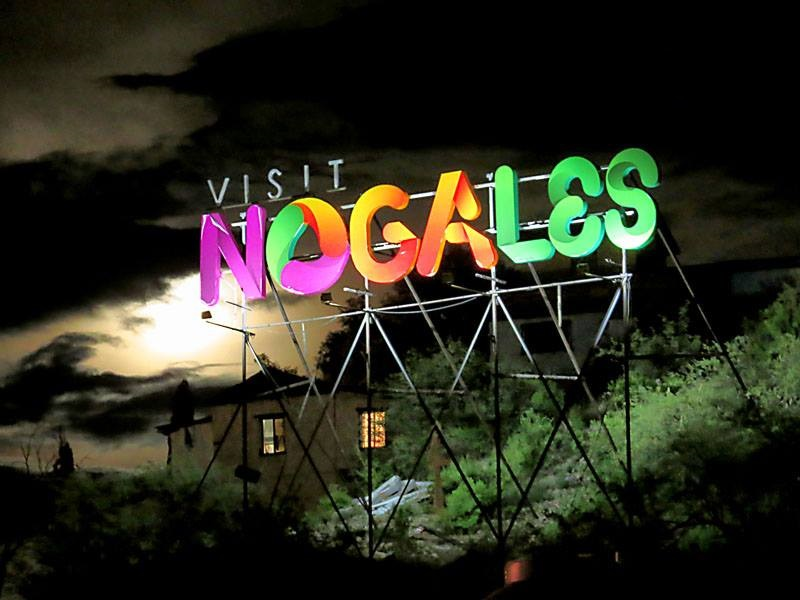
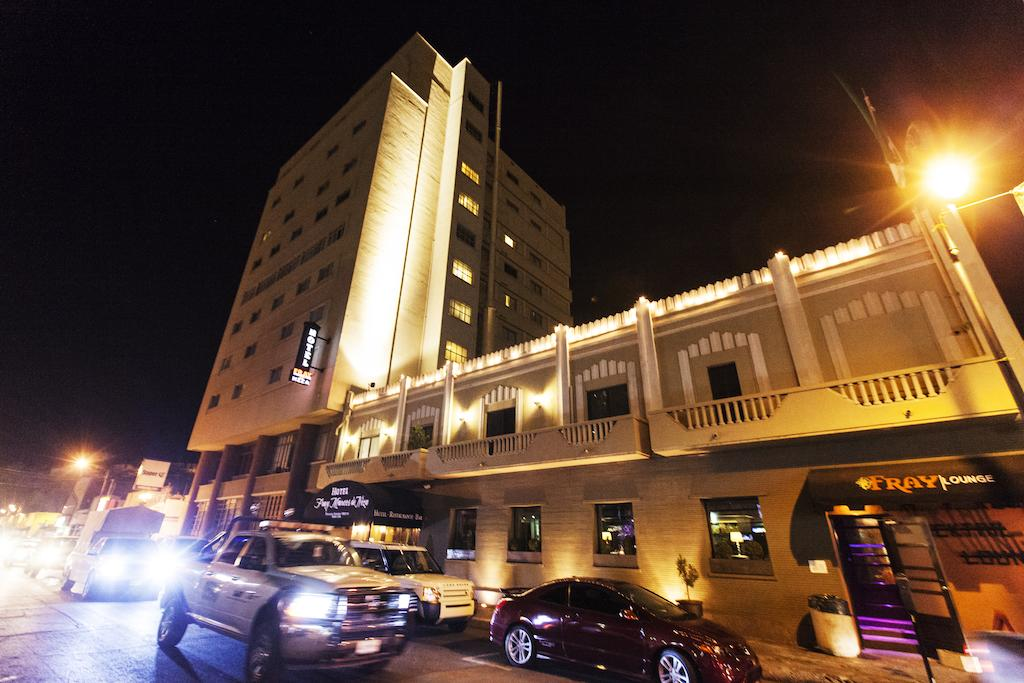
- Sign seen when entering the city Calle Antonio Campillo

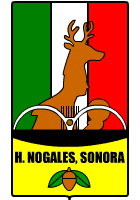
- Seal

- Location within Sonora Location within Mexico
- Coordinates: 31°19′07″N 110°56′45″W
- Country: Mexico
- State: Sonora
- Municipality: Nogales
- Founded: July 9, 1884
- Founder: Luis Emeterio Torres

Government
  - Municipal President: Juan Francisco Gim Nogales (Morena)
- Elevation: 1,199 m (3,934 ft)

Population (2020)
  - Total: 264,782
- Demonym: Nogalense
- Time zone: UTC−07:00 (Zona Pacífico)
- Postal code: 84000
- Area code: +52 631
- Website: Official Website

Nogales, also known formally as Heroica Nogales (Spanish pronunciation: [eˈɾojka noˈɣales]), is a city in the Mexican state of Sonora. It is located in the north of the state on the U.S. border, and is abutted on its north by the city of Nogales, Arizona. It serves as the seat of the surrounding municipality of Nogales.

The name Nogales is the Spanish term for "walnut trees". The municipality reported a population of 264,782 in the 2020 census. By 2024, the city had been estimated to have surpassed 300,000 inhabitants.

== History ==
The independent Nogales Municipality, which included the town of Nogales, was established on July 11, 1884. The municipality of Nogales covers an area of 1,675 km^{2}. Nogales was declared a city within the municipality on January 1, 1920.

=== Battle of Ambos Nogales ===
The international trade that existed between Nogales, Sonora, and Nogales, Arizona, greatly propelled the economic development of Heroica Nogales, and the greater Northern Sonora region, but that did not prevent significant problems from forming in the area after the outbreak of the 1910 Mexican Revolution.

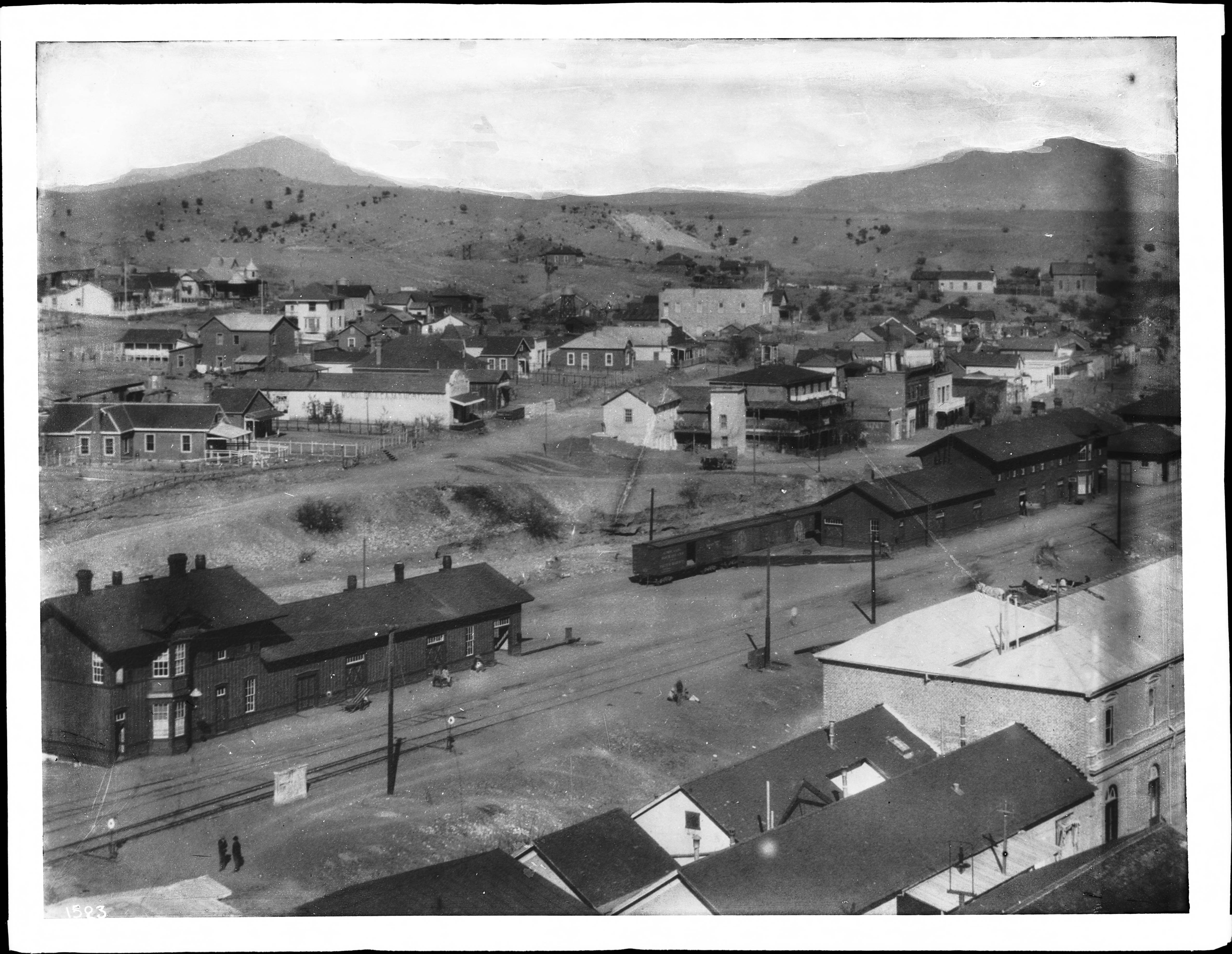
Panoramic view of the city of Nogales, Sonora, circa 1905

On August 27, 1918, at about 4:10 pm, a gun battle erupted unintentionally when a Mexican civilian attempted to pass through the border, back to Mexico, without checking in at the U.S. Customs house. After the initial shooting, reinforcements from both sides rushed to the border. On the Mexican side, the majority of the belligerents were civilians upset with the killings of Mexican border crossers by the U.S. Army along the vaguely defined border between the two cities during the previous year (the U.S. Border Patrol did not exist until 1924). For the Americans, the reinforcements were 10th Cavalry and 35th Infantry soldiers, and civilians. Hostilities quickly escalated and several soldiers were killed and others wounded on both sides. The mayor of Nogales, Sonora, Félix B. Peñaloza, was killed when waving a white truce flag or handkerchief with his cane.

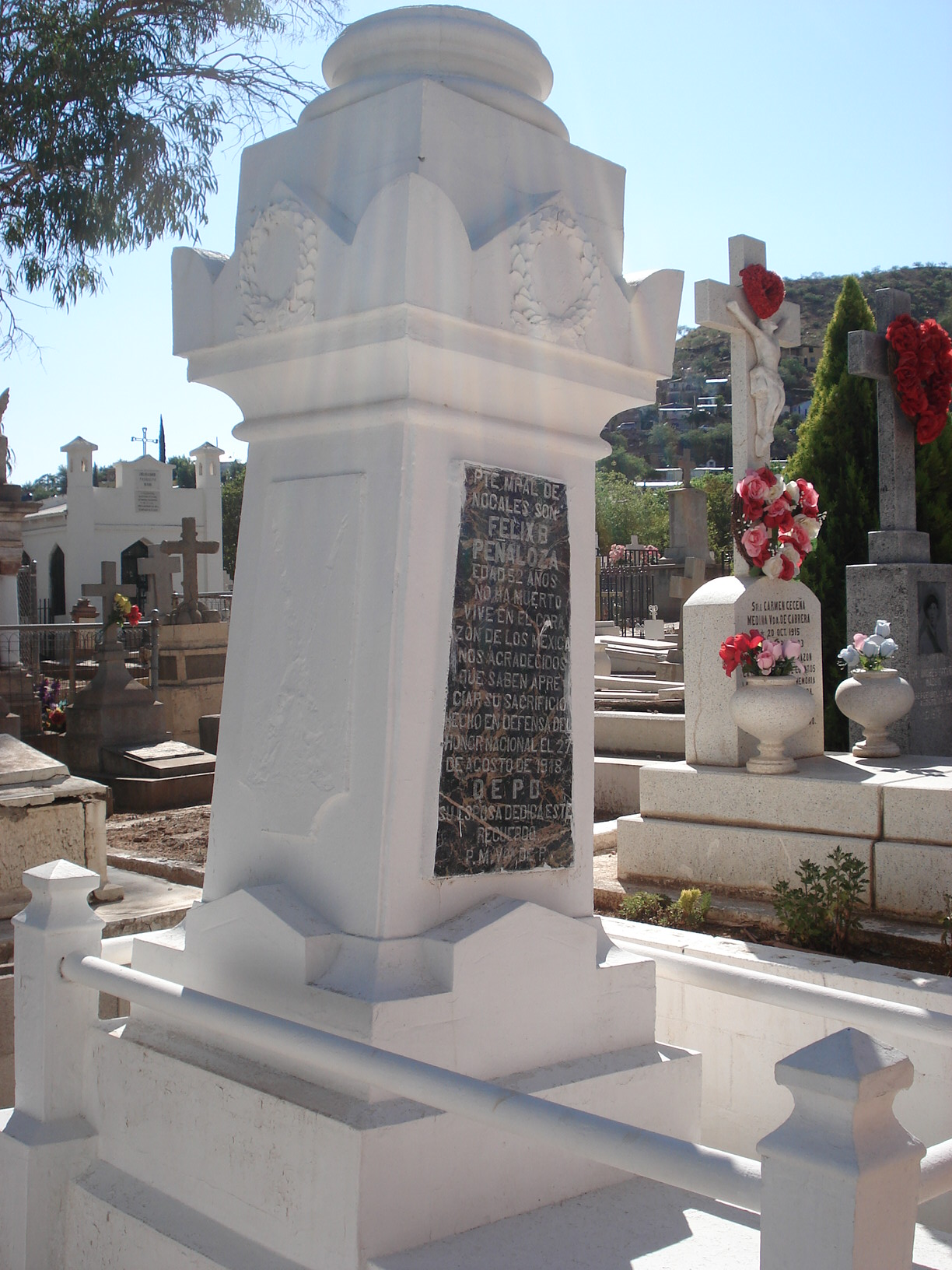
The tomb of Félix B. Peñaloza (Mayor of Nogales, Sonora, in August 1918) at the Panteón de los Héroes, Nogales, Sonora

Due in part to the heightened hysteria caused by World War I, allegations surfaced that German agents fomented this violence and died fighting alongside the Mexican troops it was claimed they led into battle. U.S. newspaper reports in Nogales prior to the battle of August 27, 1918, documented the departure of the Mexican garrison in Nogales, Sonora, to points south that August in an attempt to quell armed political rebels. Furthermore, an investigation by Army officials from Fort Huachuca, Arizona, could not substantiate accusations of militant German agents in the Mexican border community and instead traced the origins of the violence to the abuse of Mexican border crossers in the year prior to the Battle of Ambos Nogales. The main result of this battle was the building of the first permanent border fence between the two cities of Nogales. Though largely unheard of in the U.S. (and even within most of Mexico), the municipal leaders of Nogales, Sonora, successfully petitioned Congress in 1961 to grant the border city the title of "Heroic City", leading to the community's official name, Heroica Nogales, a distinction shared with the Sonoran cities of Guaymas, Caborca, Cananea and Ures, and a number of other cities in Mexico.

=== Escobarista Rebellion ===
Early in March 1929, the Escobarista Rebellion exploded in Nogales, sponsored by Obregonistas, supporters of President Álvaro Obregón, who had been assassinated on July 17, 1928. General Manuel Aguirre, commanding the rebellious 64th Regiment, took power without firing a shot, causing federales from Naco to send a daily airplane to attack the rebels. It dropped a few bombs over Nogales without doing any damage, while the rebels fought back with machine guns from the roofs without doing any damage to the airplane. There was only one casualty, a woman who was scared by a bomb explosion and had a heart attack. That same month, a hooded man appeared at night driving a tank on Morley Street on the U.S. side, then entered Mexico to help the federales in Naco. It seems that the tank had been bought in 1927 for fighting the Yaquis, but U.S. officials prohibited it from leaving the U.S., and it had been kept in a warehouse in Nogales, Arizona.

== Climate ==
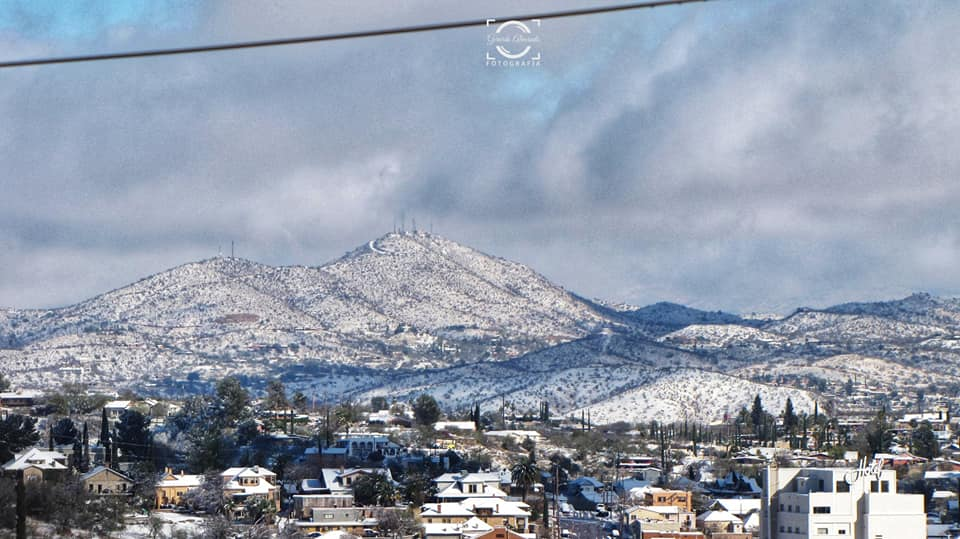
Snow covered hills of Nogales.

Nogales has a semi-arid climate (Köppen: BSk) with hot summers and cool winters, often presenting freezing temperatures.

Climate data for Heroica Nogales, Sonora (1981-2010, extremes (1963-present)
| Month | Jan | Feb | Mar | Apr | May | Jun | Jul | Aug | Sep | Oct | Nov | Dec | Year |
|---|---|---|---|---|---|---|---|---|---|---|---|---|---|
| Record high °C (°F) | 31.0 (87.8) | 32.0 (89.6) | 36.0 (96.8) | 40.0 (104.0) | 44.0 (111.2) | 46.0 (114.8) | 43.0 (109.4) | 43.0 (109.4) | 39.0 (102.2) | 39.0 (102.2) | 33.0 (91.4) | 29.0 (84.2) | 46.0 (114.8) |
| Mean daily maximum °C (°F) | 17.8 (64.0) | 18.1 (64.6) | 21.0 (69.8) | 24.9 (76.8) | 29.3 (84.7) | 34.1 (93.4) | 33.5 (92.3) | 32.1 (89.8) | 30.7 (87.3) | 26.4 (79.5) | 21.2 (70.2) | 17.3 (63.1) | 25.5 (77.9) |
| Daily mean °C (°F) | 10.1 (50.2) | 10.6 (51.1) | 13.1 (55.6) | 16.6 (61.9) | 20.8 (69.4) | 25.6 (78.1) | 26.4 (79.5) | 25.3 (77.5) | 23.4 (74.1) | 18.8 (65.8) | 13.5 (56.3) | 9.9 (49.8) | 17.8 (64.0) |
| Mean daily minimum °C (°F) | 2.3 (36.1) | 3.1 (37.6) | 5.2 (41.4) | 8.2 (46.8) | 12.3 (54.1) | 17.0 (62.6) | 19.3 (66.7) | 18.5 (65.3) | 16.2 (61.2) | 11.1 (52.0) | 5.8 (42.4) | 2.5 (36.5) | 10.1 (50.2) |
| Record low °C (°F) | −10.0 (14.0) | −9.0 (15.8) | −9.0 (15.8) | −4.0 (24.8) | −2.0 (28.4) | 0.0 (32.0) | 11.0 (51.8) | 8.0 (46.4) | 6.0 (42.8) | −3.0 (26.6) | −4.0 (24.8) | −19.0 (−2.2) | −10.0 (14.0) |
| Average precipitation mm (inches) | 24.7 (0.97) | 27.7 (1.09) | 19.5 (0.77) | 8.1 (0.32) | 5.0 (0.20) | 10.0 (0.39) | 110.5 (4.35) | 115.1 (4.53) | 52.0 (2.05) | 32.7 (1.29) | 21.5 (0.85) | 28.1 (1.11) | 454.9 (17.91) |
| Average precipitation days (≥ 0.1 mm) | 3.5 | 3.5 | 2.6 | 1.4 | 1.2 | 1.6 | 10.1 | 9.9 | 4.8 | 2.6 | 2.6 | 3.5 | 47.3 |
Source: Servicio Meteorológico Nacional

== Demographics ==
As of 2000, the census reported that the city of Nogales had a population of 159,103 people, representing approximately 50% growth from 1990. By the 2005 census the official population of the city was 189,759, and that of the municipality was 193,517. At the latest census in 2020, the official numbers were 264,782 for the municipality. As of 2020, 1,980 inhabitants spoke an indigenous language, with the Mayo language being the most spoken at 1,024 speakers. There were 2,410 documented immigrants living in Nogales in 2020, most of them from the United States (2,368). In that census, it was recorded that 71% of households had access to the internet and 95.6% of households had at least one cellphone. 46.8% of residents ages 15+ had an education of middle school or lower and the rest (53.2%) had a high school diploma/general baccalaureate or a college degree. This number has increased rapidly since the 2000 census. Nogales had the lowest rating on the Gender Inequality Index (0.33) of any municipality in Sonora, indicating higher gender equity than other places in the state. Just under 30% of inhabitants lived in poverty as of 2020, which is lower than Mexico's average of 44.2%.

The city and the municipality both rank third in the state in population, after Hermosillo and Ciudad Obregón. The municipality includes many outlying but small rural communities. The only other localities with over 1,000 inhabitants are La Mesa (2,996) 31°09′35″N 110°58′28″W and Centro de Readaptación Social Nuevo (2,203) 31°11′04″N 110°58′04″W. Nogales is served by Nogales International Airport.

The population growth is in part due to the influx of industry that has come since the opening of the maquiladora industry through the National Industrialization Program, decades before the North American Free Trade Agreement (NAFTA). During the 1990s, this economic context was, in part, held by an important Sonora state social policy by the Secretary of Urban Infrastructure and Ecology, Vernon Pérez Rubio, accomplishing the city's total coverage on drinking water, with a 20-year guaranteed service. Manufacturing now accounts for 55% of the city's gross domestic product, and services are growing as well, most of this caused by the growing jobs in the city.

Nogales has experienced enormous population growth which covers the hills along the central narrow north–south valley. Dispersed among the houses is a mixture of factories, stores, etc. In 2006, the southern half of the city experienced a modern urbanization development including shopping malls, wide avenues, and modern housing conglomerations.

The city of Nogales shares border crossings with Nogales, Arizona, via the Mariposa, DeConcini, and Morley Gate crossings.

== Monuments ==
At the center of Nogales, there is the Plaza de Benito Juárez. Here there is a statue with two leading figures designed by Spanish sculptor Alfredo Just. This is a tribute to President Benito Juárez, and the other is the "Monument to Ignorance", where a naked man who represents the Mexican people is fighting with a winged creature that represents ignorance.

== Economy ==
=== Transportation ===
Nogales is the terminus of Federal Highway 15. It serves as the primary commercial artery that links Nogales to major cities in Mexico as well as Interstate 19 at the U.S. border.

In aviation, the city is served by Nogales International Airport, which, as of 2015 had no commercial airline service.

=== Tourism ===
Due to its location, Nogales is one of the most important ports of entry for U.S. tourists. The downtown area consists of bars, hotels, restaurants, and a large number of curio stores, which sell a large variety of artesanías (handicrafts, leather art, handmade flowers, clothes) brought from the deeper central and southern states of Mexico. Local dishes commonly available in restaurants include many types of antojitos (Mexican food) such as enchiladas, tacos, burritos with machaca (dried meat), menudo and tamales.

=== Manufacturing ===
Maquiladoras, or manufacturing plants, employ a large percentage of the population. Nogales's proximity to the U.S. and the abundance of inexpensive labor make it an efficient location for foreign companies to have manufacturing and assembly operations. The companies that have established maquiladoras in Nogales include Continental AG, Amphenol Corporation, The Chamberlain Group, Walbro, and ABB.

==== Production and export ====
Approximately 92 establishments produce foreign exports. Sixty-five of these establishments are located in seven industrial parks, which employ approximately 25,400 workers, around 50 percent of the total employed population of the municipality. Also important to the economy is livestock for both foreign export and cattle breeding.

==== Agriculture ====
Produce is one of Mexico's largest exports to the United States and the Nogales-Mariposa Port of Entry, at Nogales, is the most widely used route for produce destined for the U.S. Currently, 37% of all produce imported from Mexico to the U.S. passes through Nogales, making it the largest border crossing for Mexican fresh produce. In the winter, the percentage of U.S. imported vegetables passing through Nogales jumps up to about 60%. In 2020, an estimated $3.7 billion worth of fresh produce entered the U.S. through Nogales, with significant portions originating from the Western Mexican states of Sonora and Sinaloa. As of 2021, in descending order of volume, the top commodities shipped through Nogales were tomatoes (19%), watermelon (16%), cucumbers (14%), squash (13%), bell peppers (9%), grapes (6%), chili peppers (5%), mangos (4%), honeydew melon (2%) and eggplant (2%). Going the other way, the Nogales Arizona-Nogales Sonora Port of Entry was the fourth-largest crossing point for U.S. agricultural exports to Mexico in 2020, with $1.05 billion worth of fresh fruits (34%), grains (26%), meat and meat products (9%), and fresh vegetables (8%) transported by truck and rail.

The produce industry requires facilities for the storage, packing, transport and logistics of these goods and provides many with employment on both sides of the border. November through March represent peak harvesting season and it is during these months when jobs are abundant and importation is at its highest.

== Government ==
The municipality of Nogales was governed by the Institutional Revolutionary Party (PRI) from 1931 to 2006, when power shifted to the National Action Party (PAN). After more than seven decades of being in power, the PRI was defeated by the PAN when the businessman and philanthropist Marco Antonio Martínez Dabdoub ran for the presidency of Nogales, and gained access to the municipal government after winning by 30,826 votes against 23,892 for his PRI opponent.

| Term | Municipal presidents of Nogales, Sonora, 1913–2021 | Party | Notes |
|---|---|---|---|
| 1910–1913 | Fernando F. Rodríguez | | |
| 1913–1914 | Antonio Varela | | |
| 1916–1917 | Astolfo R. Cárdenas | | |
| 1917–1918 | Félix B. Peñaloza | | |
| 1918–1919 | Astolfo R. Cárdenas | | |
| 1919–1920 | Alberto Figueroa | | |
| 1920–1921 | Alejandro Villaseñor | | |
| 1921–1922 | Francisco V. Ramos | | |
| 1922–1923 | Francisco A. Casanova | | |
| 1923–1924 | Walterio Pesqueira | | |
| 1924–1925 | Jesús E. Maytorena | | |
| 1925 | Jesús Siqueiros | | Acting municipal president |
| 1925–1926 | Fernando E. Priego | | |
| 1926 | Guillermo Mascareñas | | Acting municipal president |
| 1926–1927 | Carlos Revilla | | |
| 1927 | Apolonio L. Castro | | Acting municipal president |
| 1927–1929 | Macedonio H. Jiménez | | |
| 1929–1930 | ? | | |
| 1931–1932 | Eduardo L. Soto | PNR | |
| 1932–1933 | José S. Elías | PNR | |
| 1933–1935 | Rafael E. Ruiz | PNR | |
| 1935–1937 | Enrique Aguayo | PNR | |
| 1937–1939 | Gustavo Escobosa | PNR | |
| 1939 | Manuel Mascareñas, Jr. | PRM | |
| 1939–1941 | Lauro Larios | PRM | |
| 1941–1943 | Anacleto F. Olmos | PRM | |
| 1943–1946 | Luis R. Fernández | PRM | |
| 1946–1949 | Miguel F. Vázquez | PRI | |
| 1949–1952 | Gonzalo Guerrero Almada | PRI | |
| 1952–1953 | Víctor M. Ruiz Fimbres | PRI | |
| 1953–1955 | Ernesto V. Félix | PRI | |
| 1955–1958 | Miguel Amador Torres | PRI | |
| 1958–1961 | Otilio H. Garavito | PRI | |
| 1961–1964 | Jesús Francisco Cano | PRI | |
| 1964–1967 | Ramiro Corona Godoy | PRI | |
| 1967–1970 | Leopoldo Elías Romero | PRI | |
| 1970–1973 | Octavio García García | PRI | |
| 1973–1974 | Ricardo Silva Hurtado | PRI | |
| 1974–1976 | Enrique Moralla Valdez | PRI | |
| 1976 | Jesús Retes Vásquez | PRI | Acting municipal president |
| 1976–1979 | Héctor Monroy Rivera | PRI | |
| 1979–1982 | Alejandro Silva Hurtado | PRI | |
| 1982–1985 | Enrique Moralla Valdez | PRI | |
| 1985–1988 | César José Dabdoub Chávez | PRI | |
| 1988–1991 | Leobardo Gil Torres | PRI | |
| 1991–1994 | Héctor Mayer Soto | PRI | |
| 1994–1997 | Abraham Faruk Zaied Dabdoub | PRI | |
| 1997–2000 | Wenceslao Cota Montoya | PRI | |
| 2000–2003 | Abraham Faruk Zaied Dabdoub | PRI | |
| 2003–2006 | Lorenzo Antonio de la Fuente Manríquez | PRI | |
| 2006–2009 | Marco Antonio Martínez Dabdoub | PAN | |
| 2009–2012 | José Ángel Hernández Barajas | PAN | |
| 2012–2015 | Ramón Guzmán Muñoz | PRI; PVEM | |
| 2015–2018 | David Cuauhtémoc Galindo Delgado | PAN | |
| 2018–2021 | Jesús Antonio Pujol Irastorza | PT; Morena; PES | |
| 2021– | Juan Francisco Gim Nogales | Morena | |

Voters in Nogales are represented in the Congress of the Union by Sonora's 2nd district and in the Congress of Sonora by local districts 4 and 5.

== Gallery ==
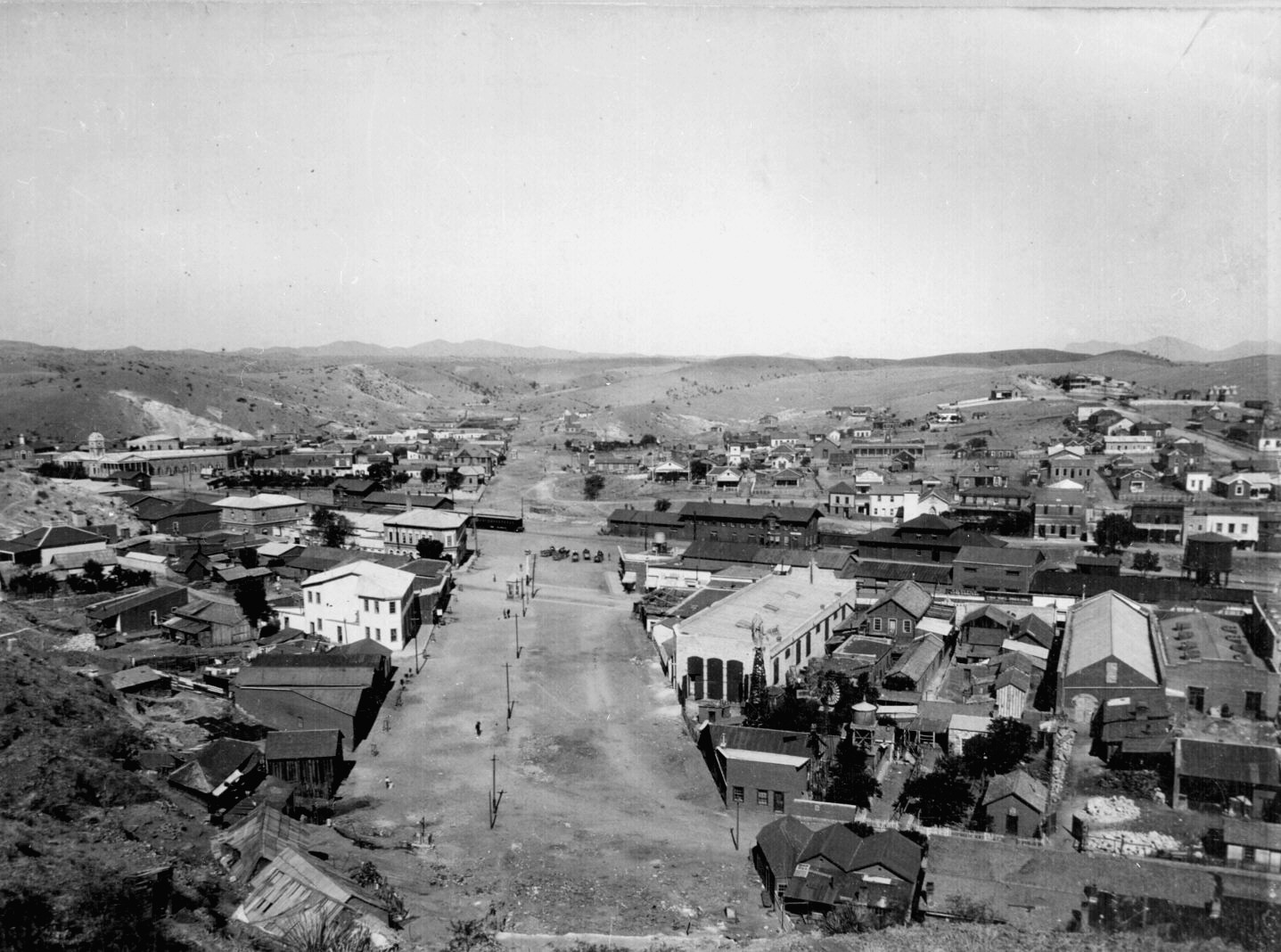
View of border in Nogales c. 1899. Sonora is on the left and Arizona is on the right.

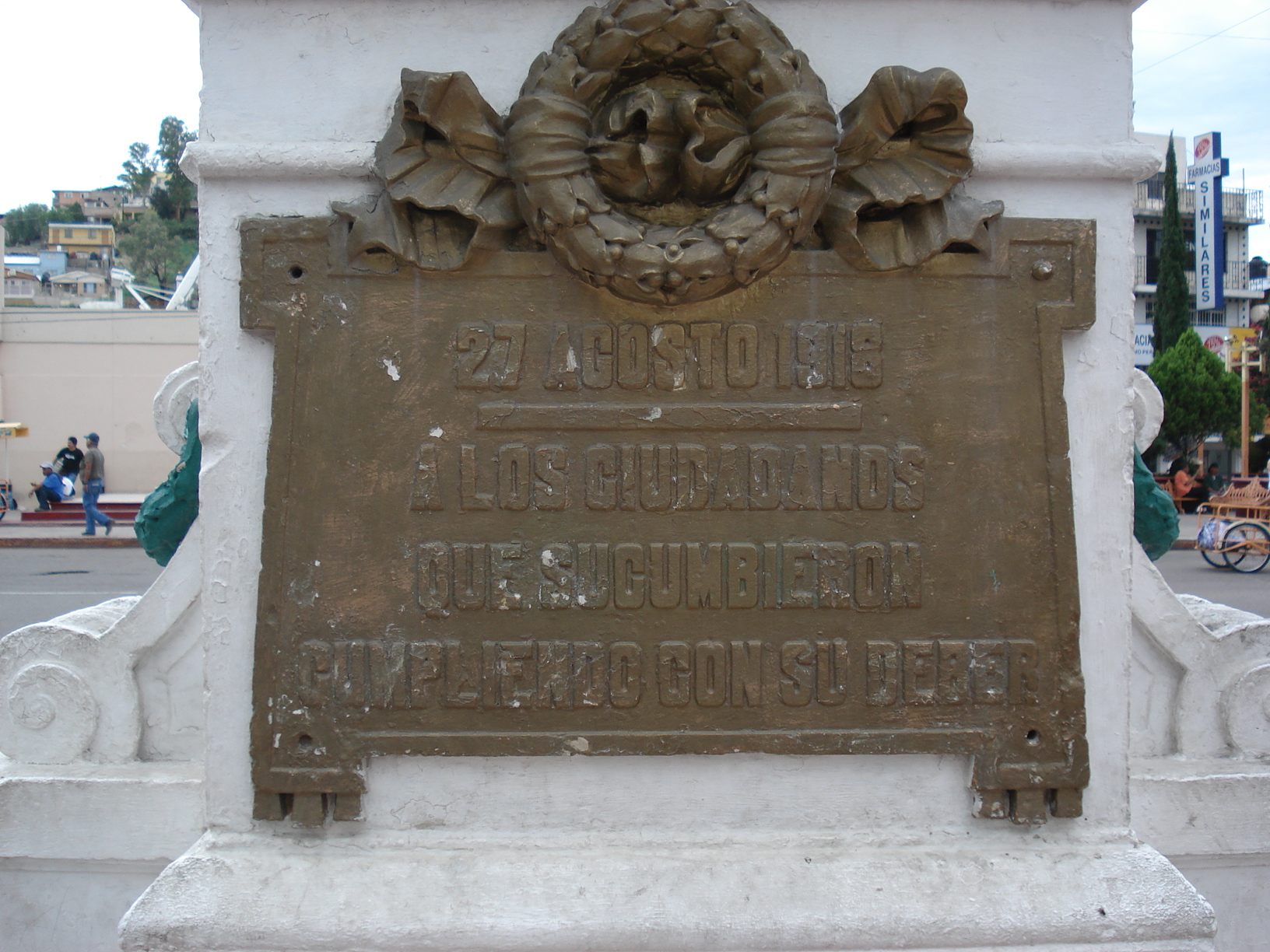
A close up of the Battle of Ambos Nogales Memorial in Heroica Nogales, Sonora. "August 27, 1918: Dedicated to the citizens who fell fulfilling their patriotic duties" (translation).

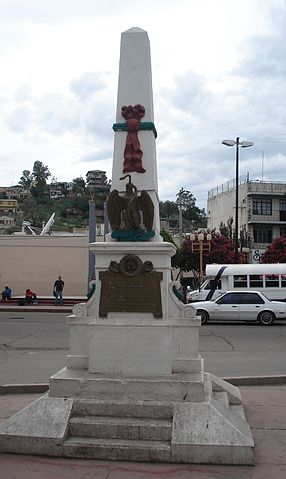
Monument to the Mexican participants of the Battle of Ambos Nogales located just south of the border on Calle Adolfo López Mateos in Nogales, Sonora.

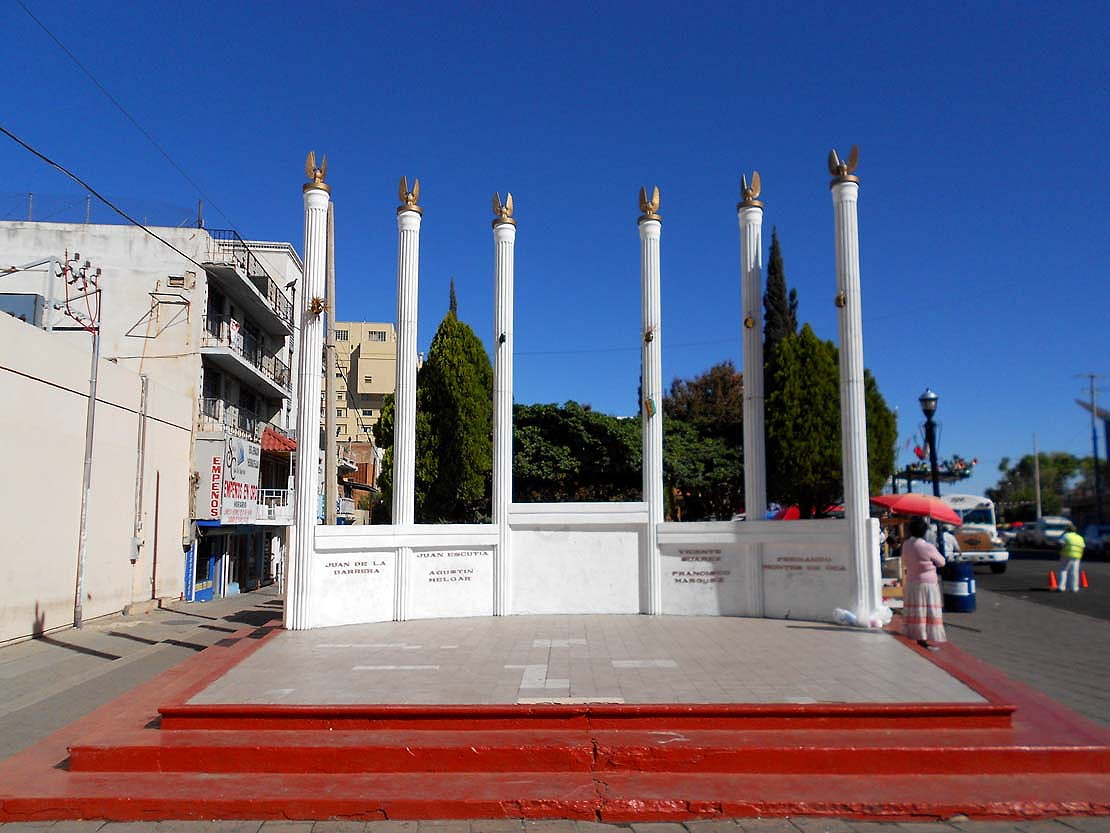
Monument to the Niños Héroes

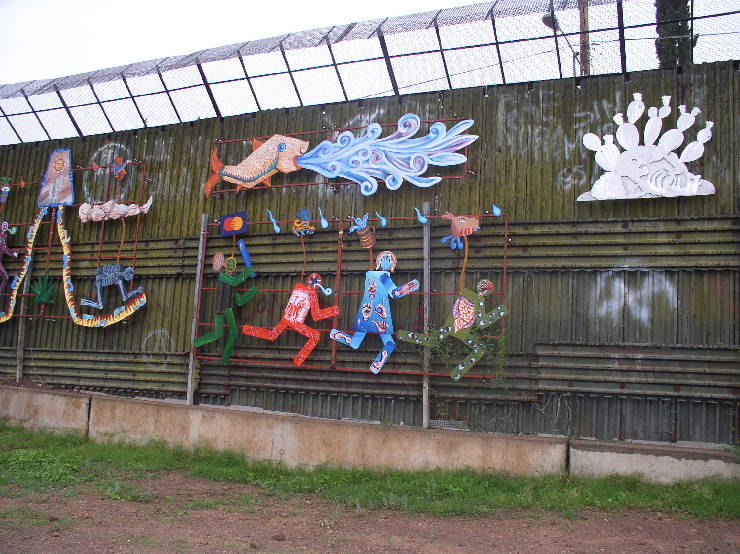
Mural on the Sonora side of the US-Mexico border in Nogales. It depicts the harsh realities of illegal immigrants travelling through the Sonoran desert. The wall itself, at this location, is constructed of Korean War-era perforated steel matting used as makeshift runways and landing strips.

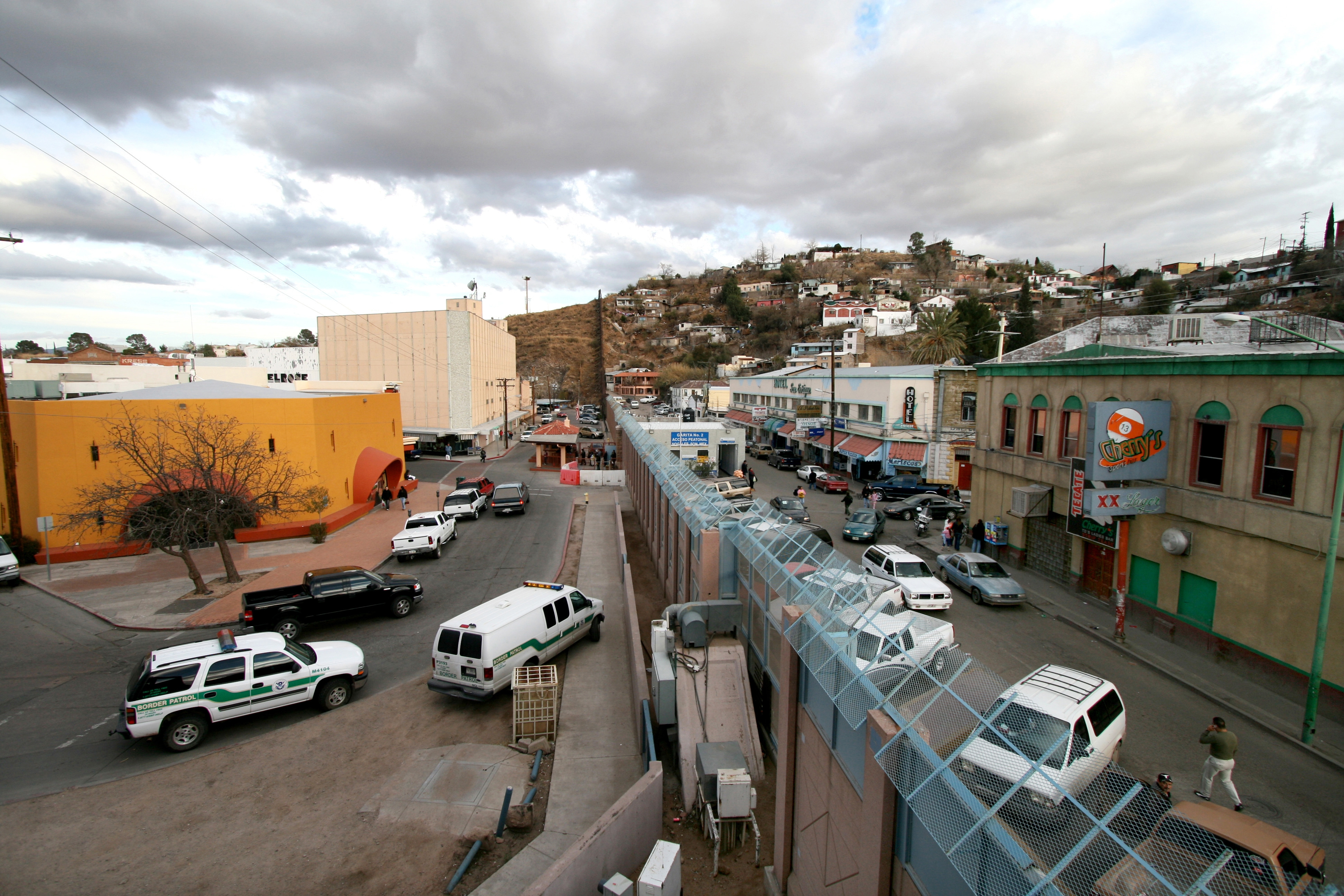
View of the border between Arizona, on the left, and Sonora, on the right.

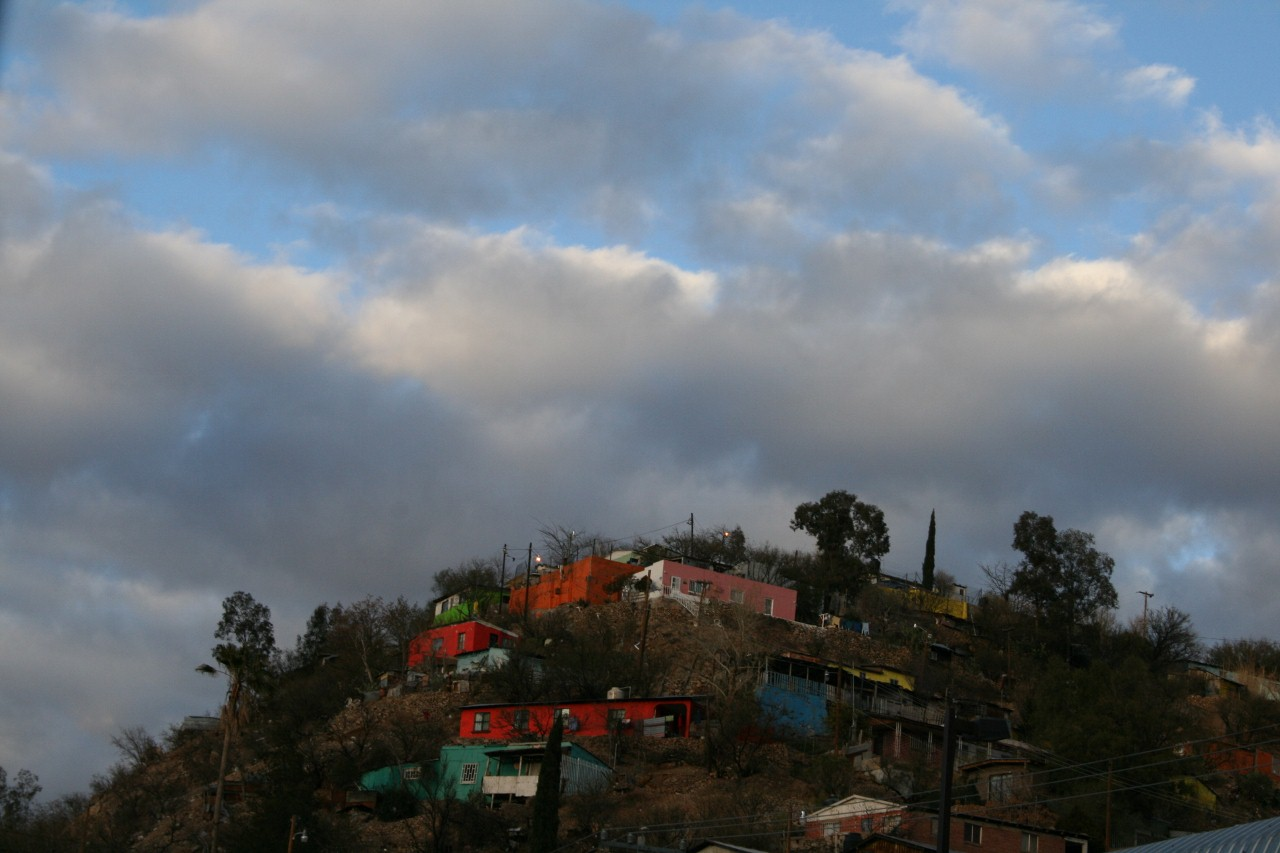
Houses on a hill in Nogales, 2010.

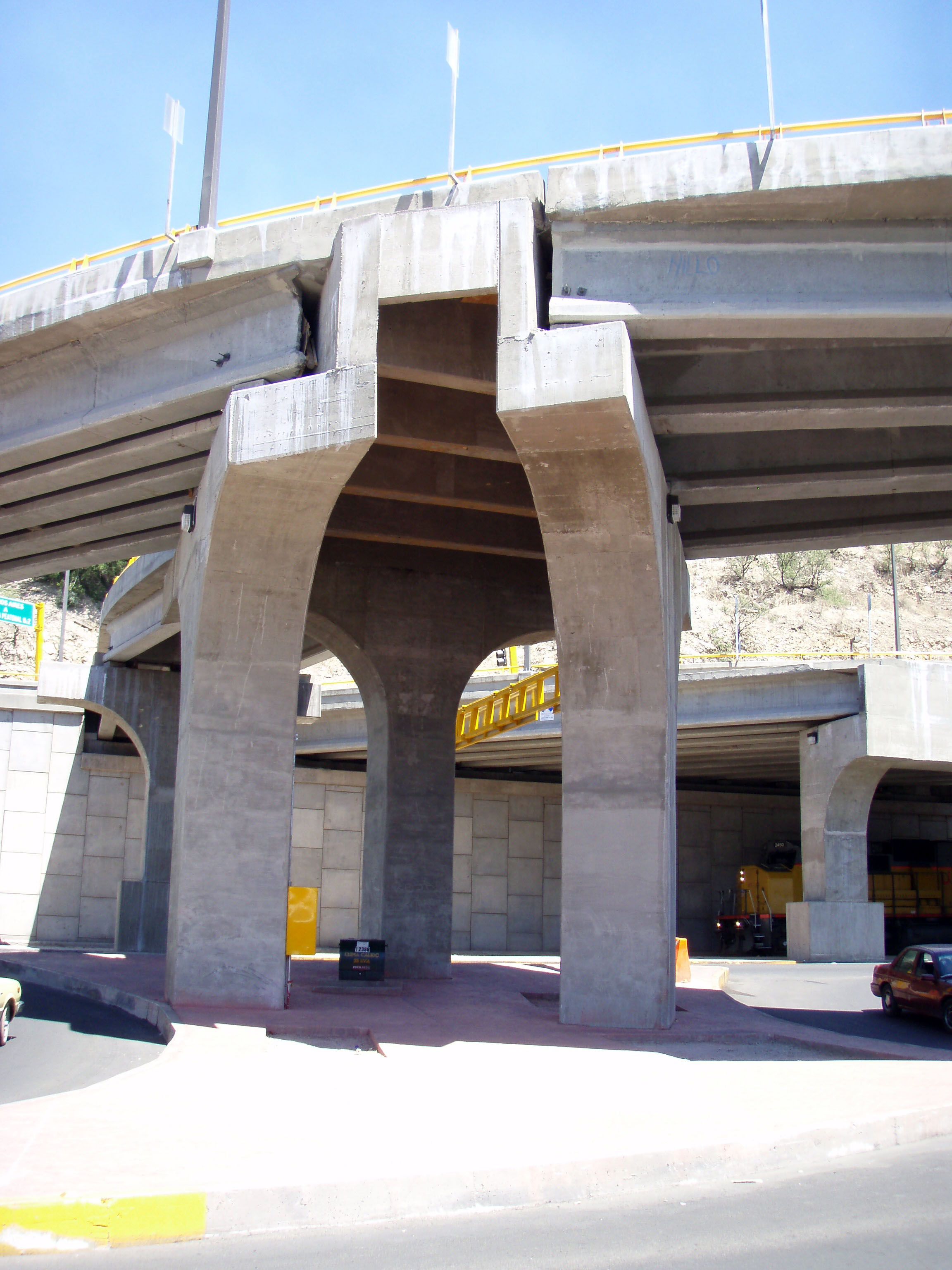
Overpass

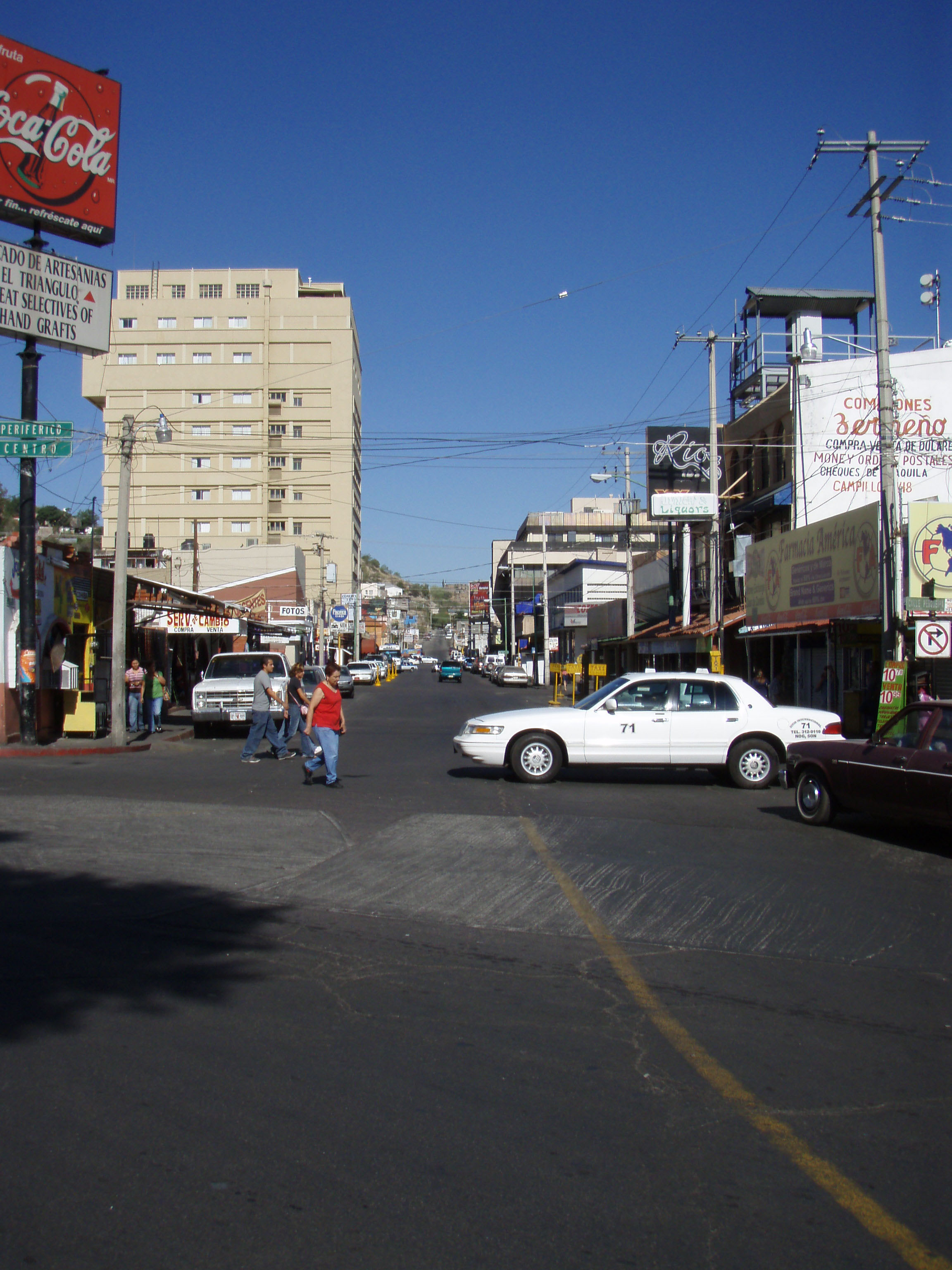
View of the city upon entering from the US.

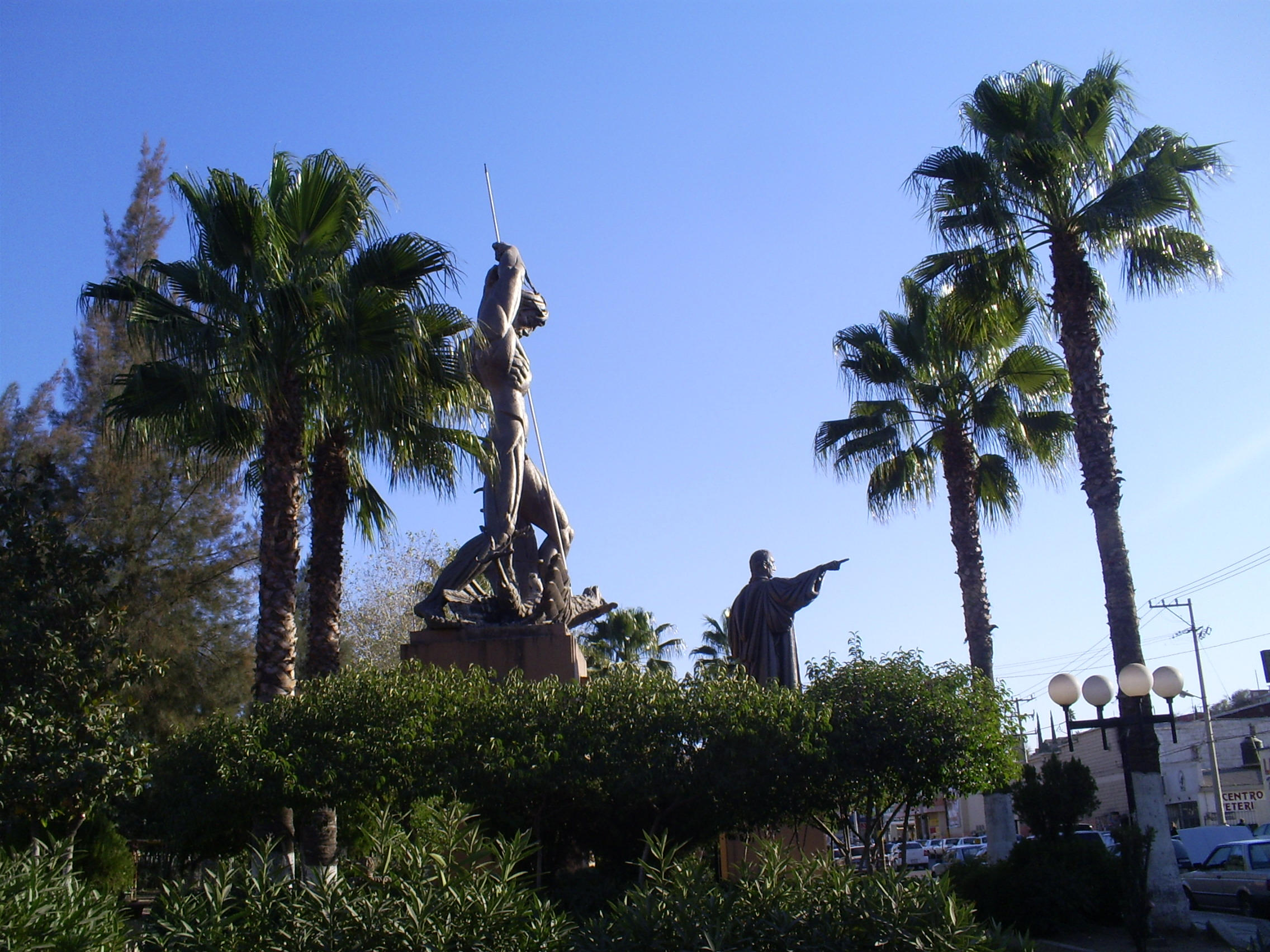
Monument to president Benito Juárez.

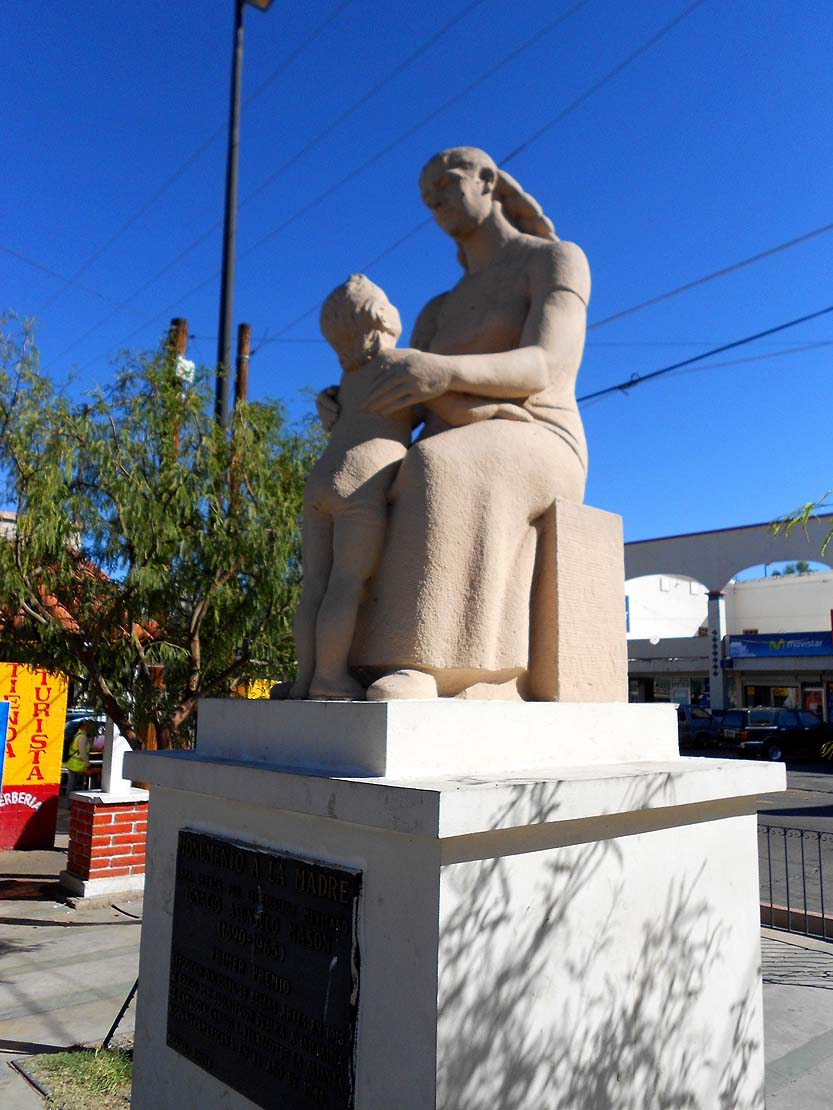
Monument to Motherhood

== Religion ==
Since 13 March 2015, its Catedral Santuario de Nuestra Señora de Guadalupe is also the episcopal cathedral see of the Roman Catholic Diocese of Nogales. It is a suffragan of the Metropolitan Archdiocese of Hermosillo, from which its diocesan territory was split off that year.

== In popular culture ==
Nogales is discussed at length in the popular political economics book Why Nations Fail, comparing the relative success of Nogales, Arizona, north of the border to the poverty of Nogales, Sonora, to the south.

Nogales is mentioned in the chorus of the song "Magdalena" by the Killers frontman Brandon Flowers from his debut solo studio album Flamingo (2010).

== Notable people ==
- Adriana Yadira Gallego, artist and art educator
- Ana Gabriela Guevara, World Athletics Championship 2003 Female, World Champion in Paris 2003 and Olympic silver medalist in 2004 Olympic Games in the 400 meters (athletics), later elected to Congress for Sonora's 2nd district (Nogales)
- David Zepeda, actor, singer, model and lawyer.
- Óscar Valdez, professional boxer, two-time Olympian, former featherweight world champion of the WBO, and former WBC super featherweight world champion.
- Esthella Provas, art dealer

== See also ==
- Nogales Municipality, Sonora
- Municipalities of Sonora
