= Nogales International Airport (Mexico) =

Airport in Nogales, Sonora, Mexico

Nogales International Airport Aeropuerto Internacional de Nogales
- IATA: NOG; ICAO: MMNG; LID: NOG

Summary
- Airport type: Public
- Operator: Grupo Olmeca-Maya-Mexica
- Serves: Nogales, Sonora, Mexico
- Time zone: MST (UTC−07:00)
- Elevation AMSL: 1,222 m (4,009 ft)
- Coordinates: 31°13′34″N 110°58′33″W
- Website: www.grupomundomaya.com/NOG

Map
- Location of the airport in Sonora NOG (Mexico)

Runways
Direction	Length		Surface
Direction	m	ft	Surface
16/34	1,800	5,906	Asphalt

Statistics (2025)
- Total passengers: 1,278
- Ranking in Mexico: 62nd
- Source: Agencia Federal de Aviación Civil

Nogales International Airport (Spanish: Aeropuerto Internacional de Nogales) (IATA: NOG, ICAO: MMNG) is an international airport located in Nogales, Sonora, Mexico, near the U.S.-Mexico border. It handles national and international air traffic for the city of Nogales, serving flight training and general aviation activities. The airport does not provide scheduled passenger public flights. The nearest airports serving commercial flights are Nogales International Airport (United States), in Nogales, Arizona, Tucson International Airport, in Arizona, and Hermosillo International Airport, in Sonora.

The airport was under the operation of Aeropuertos y Servicios Auxiliares (ASA) from 1966 to 2023. It is currently operated by Grupo Olmeca-Maya-Mexica, a military-owned corporation.

In 2025, the airport facilitated the transportation of 1,278 passengers, and in 2024, the number of passengers was 1,812.

The airport is situated at an elevation of 1,222 metres (4,009 ft) above mean sea level, covering an area of 108 hectares (270 acres). It features a single asphalt runway, designated as 16/34, measuring 1,800 by 30 metres (5,906 by 98 ft). The apron spans 4,543 square metres (48,900 sq ft), featuring one parking position for small aircraft and general aviation. Adjacent facilities include a small passenger terminal and several hangars.

== Statistics ==
=== Annual Traffic ===
Passenger statistics at Nogales Airport
Year	Total Passengers	change %	Cargo movements (t)	Air operations
2006	7,158	Steady	-	2,775
2007	7,665	▲7.08%	-	2,905
2008	4,151	▼45.84%	-	2,260
2009	3,627	▼12.62%	-	2,066
2010	3,499	▼3.53%	-	2,058
2011	3,874	▲10.72%	9	2,256
2012	3,956	▲2.12%	-	2,299
2013	3,103	▼21.56%	-	1,975
2014	2,918	▼5.96%	-	1,983
2015	2,977	▲2.02%	-	1,777
2016	2,543	▼14.58%	-	1,411
2017	2,228	▼12.39%	-	1,342
2018	2,191	▼1.7%	-	1,274
2019	2,126	▼2.97%	-	1,216
2020	1,821	▼14.35%	-	1,096
2021	4,020	▲120.76%	-	2,237
2022	2,136	▼46.87%	-	1,225
2023	1,933	▼9.5%	-	1,326
2024	1,812	▼6.26%	-	1,164
2025	1,278	▼29.47%	-	1,029

== See also ==
- List of the busiest airports in Mexico
- List of airports in Mexico
- List of airports by ICAO code: M
- List of busiest airports in North America
- List of the busiest airports in Latin America
- Transportation in Mexico
- Tourism in Mexico
- Grupo Olmeca-Maya-Mexica
