= Nogales Municipality, Sonora =

Municipality of Nogales
- Municipality
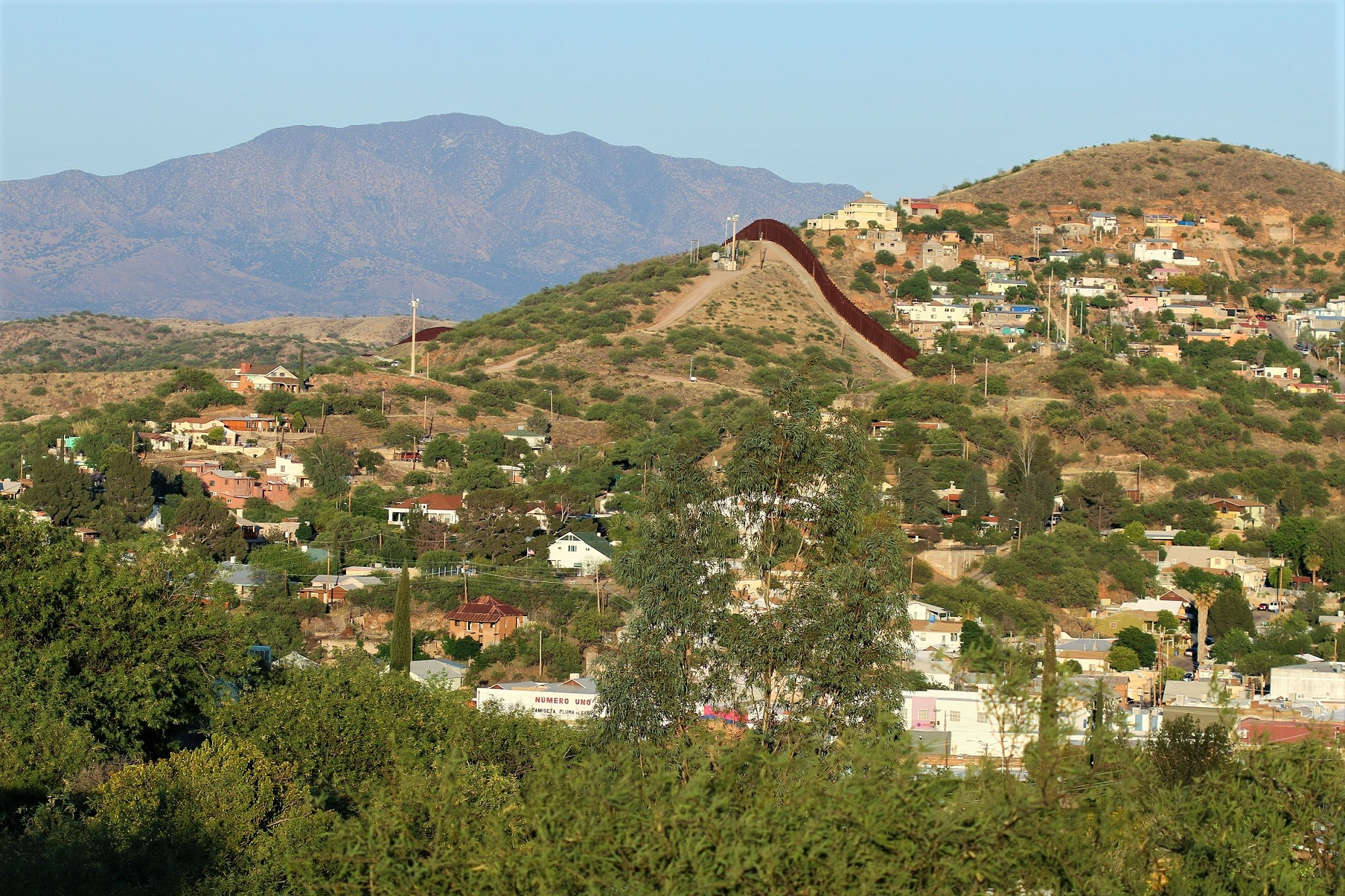
- City of Nogales and landscape of the municipality of Nogales.

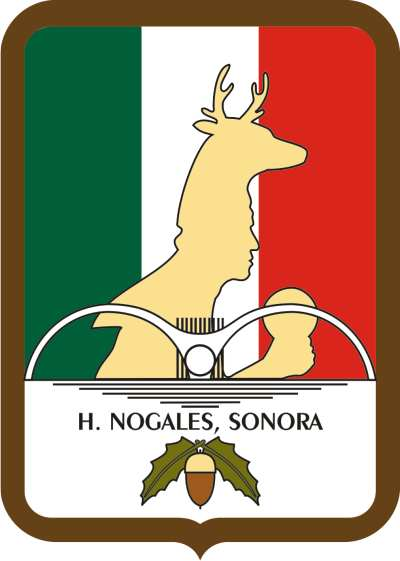
- Coat of arms

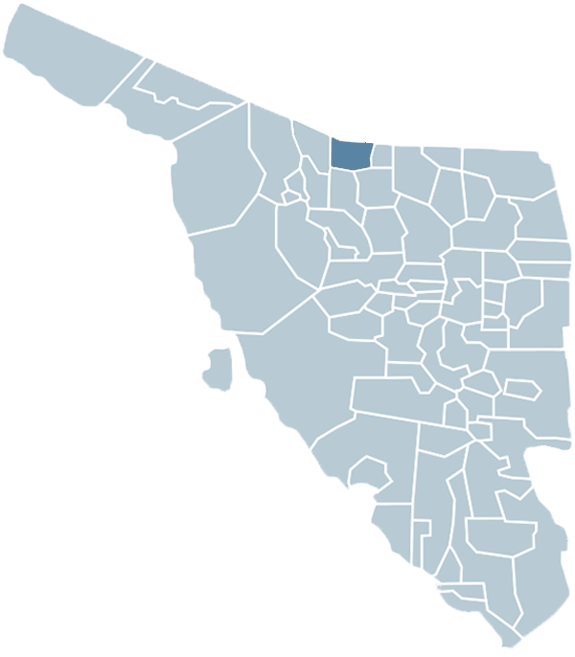
- Location of the municipality of Nogales in Sonora
- Country: Mexico
- State: Sonora
- Municipal seat: Nogales
- Established: 1884

Area
  - Total: 1,675 km^{2} (647 sq mi)

Population (2020)
  - Total: 264,782
- Time zone: UTC–07:00 (Zona Pacífico)
- Area code: +52 631

Nogales is a municipality in the state of Sonora in northwestern Mexico, being the most densely populated municipality in Sonora. The name "Nogales" is the Spanish word for walnut trees.

== Geography ==
The northern boundary of the municipality is located along the U.S.—Mexico border.

The seat of the municipality is the City of Nogales. The city is abutted on its north by the city of Nogales, Arizona, United States.

== History ==
The independent municipality of Nogales, which included the town of Nogales, was established on July 11, 1884. The municipality of Nogales covers an area of 1,675 km^{2}. Nogales was declared a city within the municipality on January 1, 1920.

=== Escobarista Rebellion ===
Early in March 1929, the Escobarista Rebellion exploded in Nogales, sponsored by Obregonistas, supporters of President Álvaro Obregón, who had been assassinated on July 17, 1928. General Manuel Aguirre, commanding the rebellious 64th Regiment, took power without firing a shot, causing federales from Naco to send a daily airplane to attack the rebels. It dropped a few bombs over Nogales without doing any damage, while the rebels fought back with machine guns from the roofs without doing any damage to the airplane. There was only one casualty, a woman who was scared by a bomb explosion and had a heart attack. That same month, a hooded man appeared at night driving a tank on Morley Street on the U.S. side, then entered Mexico to help the federales in Naco. It seems that the tank had been bought in 1927 for fighting the Yaquis, but U.S. officials prohibited it from leaving the U.S., and it had been kept in a warehouse in Nogales, Arizona.

== Government ==
The municipality of Nogales was governed by the Institutional Revolutionary Party (PRI) from 1931 until the 2006 elections, when power shifted to the National Action Party (PAN). After more than seven decades of being in power, the PRI was ousted by PAN when long-time businessman and philanthropist Marco Antonio Martínez Dabdoub ran for the presidency of Nogales, and gained access to the municipal government after having won by 30,826 votes against 23,892 of his PRI opponent.

The body of Cecilia Yépiz Reyna, former Secretary of Urban Development and Ecology, was found in a shallow grave near the border on March 6, 2021, after a three-month search. Her brother accused municipal president Jesús Pujol Irastorza (MORENA), of the kidnapping and murder.

=== Municipal presidents ===
Term	Municipal president	Political party	Notes
1910–1913	Fernando F. Rodríguez		
1913–1914	Antonio Varela		
1916–1917	Astolfo R. Cárdenas		
1917–1918	Félix B. Peñaloza		
1918–1919	Astolfo R. Cárdenas		
1919–1920	Alberto Figueroa		
1920–1921	Alejandro Villaseñor		
1921–1922	Francisco V. Ramos		
1922–1923	Francisco A. Casanova		
1923–1924	Walterio Pesqueira		
1924–1925	Jesús E. Maytorena		
1925	Jesús Siqueiros		Acting municipal president
1925–1926	Fernando E. Priego		
1926	Guillermo Mascareñas		Acting municipal president
1926–1927	Carlos Revilla		
1927	Apolonio L. Castro		Acting municipal president
1927–1929	Macedonio H. Jiménez		
1929–1930	?		
1931–1932	Eduardo L. Soto	PNR	
1932–1933	José S. Elías	PNR	
1933–1935	Rafael E. Ruiz	PNR	
1935–1937	Enrique Aguayo	PNR	
1937–1939	Gustavo Escobosa	PNR	
1939	Manuel Mascareñas, Jr.	PRM	
1939–1941	Lauro Larios	PRM	
1941–1943	Anacleto F. Olmos	PRM	
1943–1946	Luis R. Fernández	PRM	
1946–1949	Miguel F. Vázquez	PRI	
1949–1952	Gonzalo Guerrero Almada	PRI	
1952–1953	Víctor M. Ruiz Fimbres	PRI	
1953–1955	Ernesto V. Félix	PRI	
1955–1958	Miguel Amador Torres	PRI	
1958–1961	Otilio H. Garavito	PRI	
1961–1964	Jesús Francisco Cano	PRI	
1964–1967	Ramiro Corona Godoy	PRI	
1967–1970	Leopoldo Elías Romero	PRI	
1970–1973	Octavio García García	PRI	
1973–1974	Ricardo Silva Hurtado	PRI	
1974–1976	Enrique Moralla Valdez	PRI	
1976	Jesús Retes Vásquez	PRI	Acting municipal president
1976–1979	Héctor Monroy Rivera	PRI	
1979–1982	Alejandro Silva Hurtado	PRI	
1982–1985	Enrique Moralla Valdez	PRI	
1985–1988	César José Dabdoub Chávez	PRI	
1988–1991	Leobardo Gil Torres	PRI	
1991–1994	Héctor Mayer Soto	PRI	
1994–1997	Abraham Faruk Zaied Dabdoub	PRI	
1997–2000	Wenceslao Cota Montoya	PRI	
2000–2003	Abraham Faruk Zaied Dabdoub	PRI	
2003–2006	Lorenzo Antonio de la Fuente Manríquez	PRI	
2006–2009	Marco Antonio Martínez Dabdoub	PAN	
2009–2012	José Ángel Hernández Barajas	PAN	
2012–2015	Ramón Guzmán Muñoz	PRI; PVEM	
2015–2018	David Cuauhtémoc Galindo Delgado	PAN	
2018–2021	Jesús Antonio Pujol Irastorza	PT; Morena; PES	Coalition "Together We Will Make History"
2021–2024	Juan Francisco Gim Nogales	Morena	
2024–present	Juan Francisco Gim Nogales	Morena; PVEM; PT; PNA Sonora; PES Sonora	He was reelected

=== Assassination of a former Nogales official ===
On 5 January 2021, civil engineer Cecilia Yépiz Reyna, former secretary of Infrastructure, Urban Development and Ecology of the City of Nogales, disappeared. Later, on 7 March, her body was found: Yépiz had been clandestinely buried in a grave located on a site located 1.86 miles (3 kilometers) Southwest of the Mexico International Highway 15, kilometer 249 of the Nogales-Ímuris section. On 18 May 2021, the alleged perpetrator, Fernando "N", was arrested in the city of San Luis Potosí transferred first to Hermosillo, and then to Nogales.

== Population ==
The 2005 census the official population of the municipality of Nogales was 193,517. At the latest census in 2010, the official numbers were 220,292 for the Municipality.

The city and the municipality both rank third in the state in population, after Hermosillo and Ciudad Obregón. The municipality includes many outlying but small rural communities. The only other localities with over 1,000 inhabitants are La Mesa (2,996) 31°09′35″N 110°58′28″W and Centro de Readaptación Social Nuevo (2,203) 31°11′04″N 110°58′04″W. Nogales is served by Nogales International Airport.

The population growth is in part due to the influx of industry that has come since the opening of the maquiladora industry through the National Industrialization Program, decades before the North American Free Trade Agreement (NAFTA). Manufacturing now accounts for 55% of the city's gross domestic product, and services are growing as well, most of this caused by the growing jobs in the city.

Nogales is known for its recent enormous population growth which covers the hills along the central narrow north-south valley. Dispersed among the houses, the visitor will find a mixture of factories, stores, etc. In 2006, the southern half of the city experienced a modern urbanization development including shopping malls, wide avenues, and modern housing conglomerations.

== Economy ==
The primary commercial artery is Federal Highway 15, which links the state with the U.S. as well as major cities in Mexico.

=== Tourism ===
Due to its location, Nogales is one of the most important ports of entry for the U.S. The downtown area used to have a large number of bars, strip clubs, hotels, restaurants, as well as curio stores, which sold a large variety of artesanias (handicrafts, leather art, handmade flowers, clothes) brought from the deeper central and southern states of Mexico. However, now downtown Nogales has forgotten those activities, due to two main causes: the recent violence in Mexico, and the barriers imposed by the US Government after September 11, 2001.

=== Manufacturing ===
Maquiladoras, or manufacturing plants, employ a large percentage of the population. Nogales' proximity to the U.S. and the abundance of inexpensive labor make it an efficient location for foreign companies to have manufacturing and assembly operations. Some of the companies that have established maquiladoras in Nogales include: Otis Elevator, The Chamberlain Group, Walbro, and Philips Avent.

Production and export

Approximately 92 establishments produce foreign exports. Sixty-five of these establishments are located in seven industrial parks, which employ approximately 25,400 workers, around 50 percent of the total employed population of the municipality. Also important to the economy is livestock for both foreign export and cattle breeding.

== See also ==
- City of Nogales, Sonora
- Municipalities of Sonora
